= Doomsday Blue =

2023 song by Bambie Thug

- Intimate version cover artwork

Single by Bambie Thug

from the EP Cathexis
- Released: 13 October 2023
- Genre: Electro-metal
- Length: 3:03
- Label: Self-released
- Songwriters: Bambie Ray Robinson; Olivia Cassy Brooking; Sam Matlock; Tylr Rydr
- Producer: Tylr Rydr

Bambie Thug singles chronology
"Last Summer (I Know What You Did)" (2023)	"Doomsday Blue" (2023)	"Hex So Heavy" (2024)

Music video
- "Doomsday Blue" on YouTube

Eurovision Song Contest 2024 entry
- Country: Ireland
- Language: English

Finals performance
- Semi-final result: 3rd
- Semi-final points: 124
- Final result: 6th
- Final points: 278

Entry chronology
- ◄ "We Are One" (2023)
- "Laika Party" (2025) ►

Official performance video
- "Doomsday Blue" (First Semi-Final) on YouTube "Doomsday Blue" (Grand Final) on YouTube

"Doomsday Blue" is a song by Irish singer-songwriter Bambie Ray Robinson, known by their (Note: Bambie Thug uses they/them and fae/faer pronouns; this article uses they/them pronouns for consistency.) stage name, Bambie Thug. Self-described as "an electro-metal breakdown", it was written by Robinson, Olivia Cassy Brooking, Sam Matlock, and Tylr Rydr. The song was self-released on 13 October 2023, as part of their first extended play, Cathexis. The song represented Ireland in the Eurovision Song Contest 2024, where it finished in sixth place at the final with 278 points. It marked the first time since 2018 that Ireland had qualified for the final.

The song was met with a divided reaction amongst Irish society, becoming a polarising song between various political and social groups in Ireland. It was met with praise from numerous past Irish contestants and media personalities, who remarked that the song was more unique than past Irish Eurovision entries. However, it was also derided by several conservative personalities. "Doomsday Blue" drew commercial success, becoming Robinson's first charting song in their home country.

== Background and composition ==
"Doomsday Blue" was composed by Bambie Ray Robinson, Olivia Cassy "Cassyette" Brooking (who also provided uncredited backing vocals), Sam Matlock, and Tylr Rydr. In interviews given out by Robinson, Robinson claims the song is about heartbreak, deception, and the pain of unrequited love, describing it as "explosive" and "hard-hitting" but also "sweet" and "soulful". In an interview with ESCBubble, they said that the song was originally written in Wembley. They explained that whilst writing the song with Rydr, they intended to include as many different genres as possible, describing the song as "genre-defying". They described the song's composition as a mixture of alternative rock, pop, and jazz. They also described the song as "an electro-metal breakdown" that shows their music style and performance, including using a variety of genres and "switching things up" at the end of the song. The BBC's Mark Savage described the song to be "about having [one's] potential overlooked, and the marginalisation of the queer community".

The song's lyrics feature numerous "spells", including the Aramaic incantation "Avada Kedavra", a phrase popularised by the Harry Potter franchise, in which it is used to refer to the "Killing Curse", a curse that causes instantaneous and painless death. In a post on Twitter, Robinson stated that, as a non-binary person, they were "not a fan" of J. K. Rowling due to her views on transgender topics, but instead a "fan of being clever with language".

According to Robinson, they initially applied for Eurosong 2024 to "curse out" memories of being raped in May 2023 by an unnamed acquaintance, around three weeks before they were set to make their debut festival performance. When applying for Eurosong, they decided that out of the songs they had considered, "Doomsday Blue" worked best for Eurovision and the Irish audience. On 11 January 2024, Robinson was officially announced as a participant in Eurosong 2024.

== Music video and promotion ==
An accompanying music video was released on 8 March 2024, and was produced by Dublin-based production company CAMP. According to Robinson, they initially intended for the video to be "very dark" but relented after hearing that children liked their song, instead making it "a little more cutesy, spooky and comedic". The music video features a young witch writing in a "blaze bible" to cast a boyfriend, later transferring into a "candy-coloured dream world" that Robinson claims was inspired by the colours of the transgender flag. The boyfriend later ends up turning into a creature with the world breaking down, signalling the start of a toxic relationship, and for Robinson, "how quickly a situation can turn unsafe [for queer people]".

To further promote the song, Robinson confirmed their intent to participate in several Eurovision pre-parties throughout the months of March and April, including Pre-Party ES 2024 on 30 March, the London Eurovision Party 2024 on 7 April, and Eurovision in Concert 2024 on 13 April.

== Critical reception ==
=== Irish media and personalities ===
"Doomsday Blue" has drawn praise from numerous past Irish Eurovision entrants. Johnny Logan, who won Eurovision for Ireland in 1980 and 1987, stated in the Sunday World that he believed the song could win the contest, praising the song's uniqueness and staging visuals. Ireland's 2022 entrant, Brooke Scullion, also believed that the song could win. Multiple beat reporters have also praised the song; Rita Dabrowicz, a writer for the indie music review site Vanadian Avenue, praised the song, stating beliefs that "[Robinson] will bring a hell of a spectacle with them that surely will be remembered for a long time." Ed Power, writer for The Irish Times, praised the song as a "sugar-and-spice mix of pop and industrial metal [that] will undoubtedly land with a splash in Malmö." Power later wrote that he thought that the song was "a thrilling throwback to Ireland's pre-Christian heritage."

Numerous conservative personalities and groups have criticised the song and Robinson. Hermann Kelly, leader of the far-right Irish Freedom Party, posted a tweet comparing Robinson to 2008 Irish Eurovision entrant Dustin the Turkey and calling the song "woke nonsense [typical] of the Irish Establishment" that "celebrat[es] Satanism". By 6 February, over 2,000 people had signed a petition calling to disqualify Robinson from competing at Eurovision on the basis of "[Robinson] making a mockery of [Irish] national culture." Two days later, Father Declan McInerney, an Irish Catholic priest, also heavily criticised the song and Robinson, stating in a sermon that "the poor devil can neither sing nor dance", while also claiming that Robinson was trying to push "certain orientations" on the Irish public and declaring that "[Ireland] is finished as a country". Tony Wilson, a writer for British Christian magazine Premier Christianity, admitted that while he thought Robinson had good intentions writing the song, he wrote that "how the lyrics support this theme is beyond me... We should all be concerned when the occult is normalised." However, he also criticised the Catholic Church, stating that "Christians need to acknowledge that this movement has been spurred on by the serious past failings of Christendom... The Church has been guilty of abuse and repression. We are witnessing something of a backlash to this."

=== Eurovision-related and other outlets ===
Amongst other news outlets, reception to the song has been mixed. In a Wiwibloggs review containing several reviews from several critics, the song was rated 5.97 out of 10 points, earning 26th out of 37 songs on the site's annual ranking. Another review conducted by ESC Bubble that contained reviews from a combination of readers and juries rated the song 14th out of the 15 songs in the Eurovision semi-final "Doomsday Blue" was in. Vulture's Jon O'Brien ranked the song 15th out of 37, acknowledging that it could struggle to qualify from the semi-final. However, he concluded, "while the screamo verses will be nails-down-chalkboard to some, its pastoral-folk chorus is this year's Eurovision at its prettiest". ESC Beat's Doron Lahav ranked the song 16th overall, praising the uniqueness of the song compared to past Irish Eurovision entries.

== Eurovision Song Contest ==
=== Eurosong 2024 ===
Ireland's national broadcaster Raidió Teilifís Éireann (RTÉ) broadcast a Eurosong 2024 special episode of The Late Late Show on 26 January 2024, to select the Irish entrant for the Eurovision Song Contest 2024. This edition was the eighth iteration of the national final in this format. The winning song was selected via a combination of international jury, national jury, and public voting, with each group having a third of the total vote.

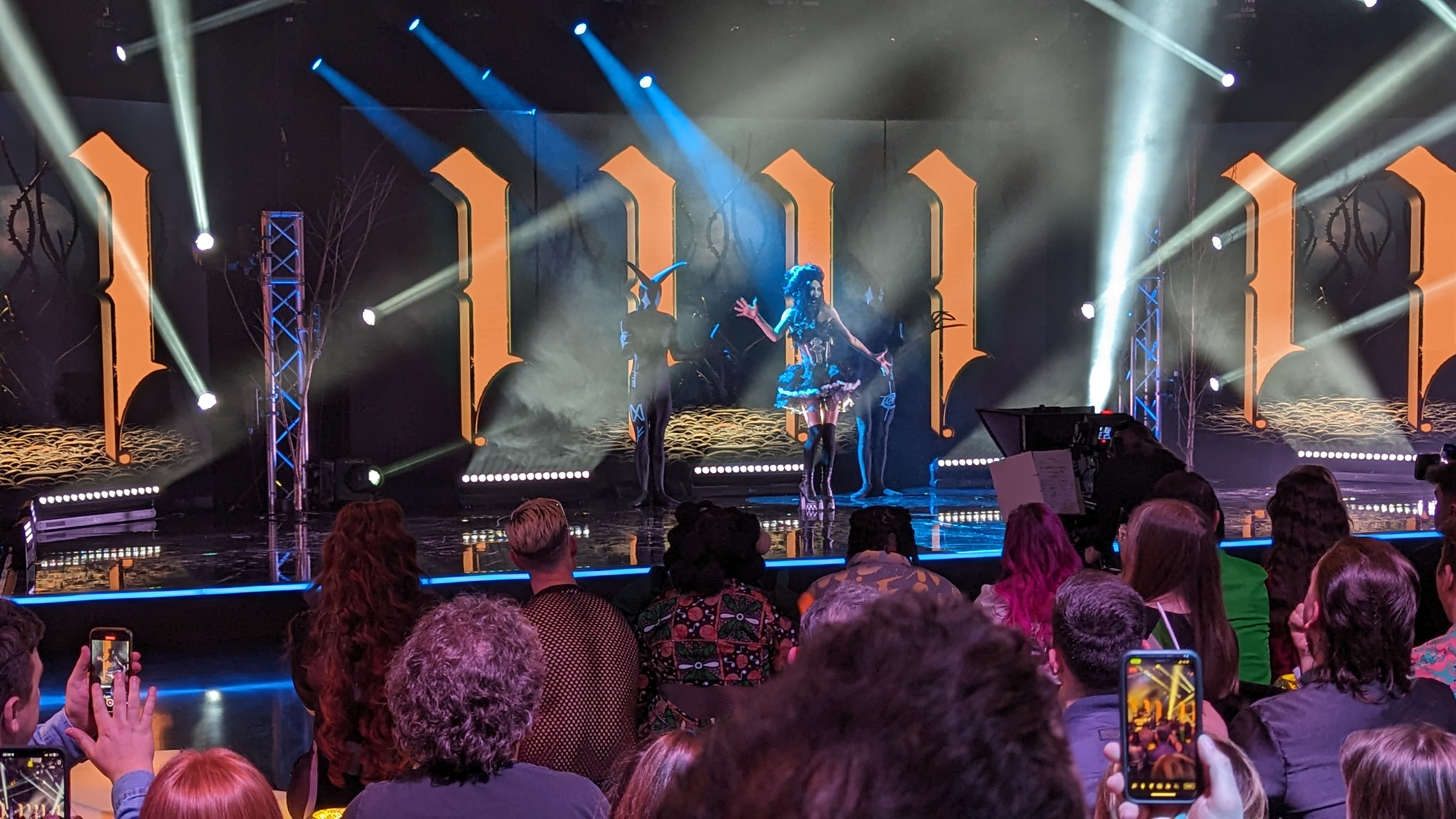
Robinson performing "Doomsday Blue" on The Late Late Show after winning Eurosong 2024.

"Doomsday Blue" was announced to compete in Eurosong 2024 and premiered on 11 January 2024 on an episode of The Ray D'Arcy Show broadcast on RTÉ Radio 1. It was drawn to perform second. In the final, Robinson came in third with the international jury, scoring eight points. However, Robinson was able to win both the televote and the national jury votes, securing two sets of 12 points, combining for a total of 32 points. The total was eight more than the second-place finishers; Ailsha, with "Go Tobann", and Next In Line, with "Love Like Us". As a result, the song won the right to perform as the Irish entrant for the Eurovision Song Contest 2024.

=== At Eurovision ===
The Eurovision Song Contest 2024 took place at the Malmö Arena in Malmö, Sweden, and consisted of two semi-finals held on the respective dates of 7 and 9 May, and the final on 11 May 2024. During the allocation draw on 30 January 2024, Ireland was drawn to compete in the first semi-final, performing in the first half of the show. Robinson was later drawn to perform fourth in the semi-final, behind Lithuania's Silvester Belt and ahead of Ukraine's duo of Alyona Alyona and Jerry Heil.

For the Eurovision performance of "Doomsday Blue", Sergio Jaén was appointed as the staging director. The performance featured the heavy use of smoke along with a circle of candles. Robinson wore a Mariusz Malon-designed black outfit adorned with antlers, with an accompanying male dancer performing "balletic choreography" around Robinson. Midway through the performance, Robinson removes the black outfit, revealing an outfit inspired by the colours of the transgender flag. Robinson was originally slated to wear line makeup that featured the message "ceasefire" and "freedom for Palestine" in Ogham as a medium of support for a ceasefire amongst the Gaza war. However, according to Robinson, the European Broadcasting Union (EBU) forced them to remove the message, only allowing the message "crown the witch" to be displayed. Robinson, who considers themself pro-Palestinian, also faced numerous calls to withdraw from the contest due to Israel's participation in that year's contest; they rejected it, stating that withdrawing "would mean one less pro-Palestinian voice at the contest". "Doomsday Blue" finished in third, receiving 124 points and securing a spot in the grand final. The qualification was the first for Ireland since 2018.

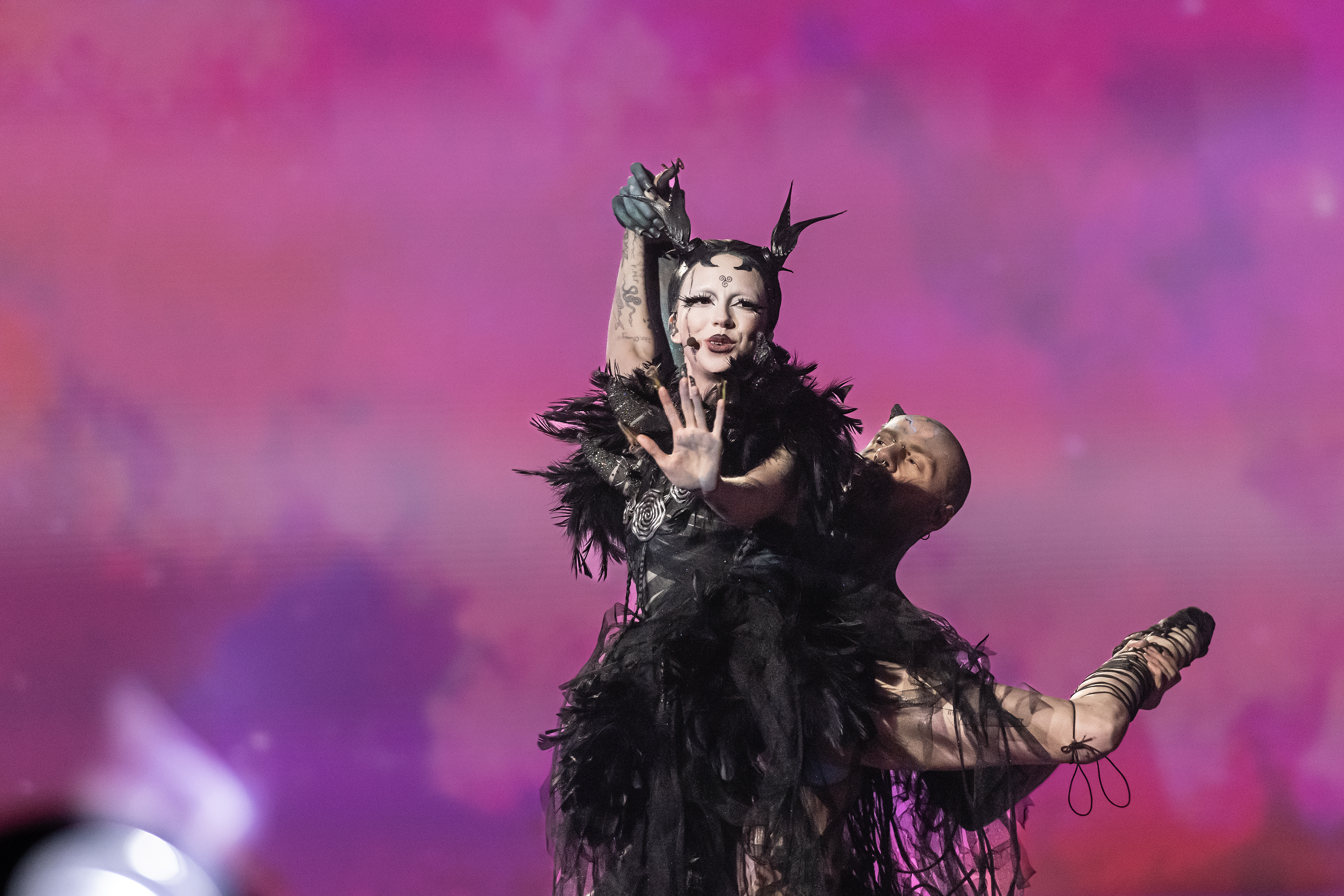
Robinson performing "Doomsday Blue" in a dress rehearsal before the Eurovision 2024 grand final.

Robinson performed a repeat of their performance in the grand final on 11 May, with the notable exception that at the end of their grand final performance, Robinson proclaimed, "Love will triumph over hate!" The song was performed in tenth, ahead of Estonia's duo of 5miinust and Puuluup and before Latvia's Dons. After the results were announced, Robinson finished sixth with a total of 278 points, with a split result of 142 points from the juries and 136 points from televoting. Regarding the former, the song managed to receive one set of the maximum 12 points from Australia. No sets of 12 points were given by the televote; the maximum given was 10 points by the United Kingdom.

After the contest, Robinson expressed frustrations with the EBU, stating that they were still "waiting for an official update" regarding the line makeup they were forced to remove. They later added, "The EBU is not what the Eurovision is. Fuck the EBU. I don't even care anymore. Fuck them". However, when responding to their high finishing position, they praised themself and fellow non-binary contestant Nemo Mettler, who won the contest. They further stated, "the world has spoken [and] the queers are coming, non-binaries for the fucking win".

== Track listing ==
Digital download/streaming

1. "Doomsday Blue" – 3:03

Digital download/streaming – Intimate version

1. "Doomsday Blue (Intimate)" – 4:16

== Charts ==
Chart performance for "Doomsday Blue"
Chart (2024)	Peak position
Finland (Suomen virallinen lista)	40
Greece International (IFPI)	12
Ireland (IRMA)	23
Latvia Streaming (LaIPA)	13
Lithuania (AGATA)	9
Netherlands (Single Top 100)	86
Poland (Polish Streaming Top 100)	60
Sweden (Sverigetopplistan)	64
Switzerland (Schweizer Hitparade)	77
UK Singles (Official Charts)	67
UK Indie (Official Charts)	13

== Release history ==
Release history and formats for "Doomsday Blue"
Country	Date	Format(s)	Version	Label	Ref.
Various	13 October 2023	Digital download; streaming	EP track	Self-released	
Various	22 April 2024	Digital download; streaming	Intimate version	Self-released	
