= Ireland in the Eurovision Song Contest 2024 =

- Eurovision Song Contest 2024
- Participating broadcaster: Raidió Teilifís Éireann (RTÉ)
- Country: Ireland
- Selection process: Eurosong 2024
- Selection date: 26 January 2024

Competing entry
- Song: "Doomsday Blue"
- Artist: Bambie Thug
- Songwriters: Bambie Ray Robinson; Olivia Cassy Brooking; Sam Matlock; Tyler Ryder

Placement
- Semi-final result: Qualified (3rd, 124 points)
- Final result: 6th, 278 points

Participation chronology

Ireland was represented at the Eurovision Song Contest 2024 with the song "Doomsday Blue", written by Bambie Ray Robinson, Olivia Cassy Brooking, Sam Matlock, and Tyler Ryder, and performed by Robinson themself under their stage name Bambie Thug. The Irish participating broadcaster, Raidió Teilifís Éireann (RTÉ), organised the national final Eurosong 2024 in order to select its entry for the contest.

Ireland was drawn to compete in the first semi-final of the Eurovision Song Contest which took place on 7 May 2024 and was later selected to perform in position 4. At the end of the show, "Doomsday Blue" was announced among the top 10 entries of the first semi-final and hence qualified to compete in the final, marking Ireland's first qualification to the final since 2018. It was later revealed that Ireland placed third out of the fifteen participating countries in the semi-final with 124 points. In the final, Ireland performed in position 10 and placed sixth out of the 25 performing countries, scoring a total of 278 points, marking the country's highest placing since 2000.

== Background ==
Prior to the 2024 contest, Raidió Teilifís Éireann (RTÉ) and its predecessor national broadcasters, had participated in the Eurovision Song Contest representing Ireland fifty-five times since RÉ's first entry in 1965. They had won the contest a record seven times in total, only equalled by Sweden in 2023. Their first win came in 1970, with "All Kinds of Everything" performed by Dana. Ireland holds the record for being the only country to win the contest three times in a row (in 1992, 1993, and 1994), as well as having the only three-time winner (Johnny Logan, who won in 1980 as a singer, 1987 as a singer-songwriter, and again in 1992 as a songwriter). In 2011 and 2012, Jedward represented the nation for two consecutive years, managing to qualify to the final both times and achieve Ireland's highest position in the contest since 1997 Marc Roberts, placing eighth in 2011 with the song "Lipstick". Since 2013, only two Irish entries managed to qualify for the final: Ryan Dolan's "Only Love Survives" which placed 26th (last) in the final in 2013, and Ryan O'Shaughnessy's "Together" which placed 16th in the final in 2018. The Irish entry in 2023, "We Are One" performed by Wild Youth, once again failed to qualify to the final.

As part of its duties as participating broadcaster, RTÉ organises the selection of its entry in the Eurovision Song Contest and broadcasts the event in the country. Upon failing to qualify for the 2023 final, Irish head of delegation Michael Kealy revealed that RTÉ was considering changing their song selection process for 2024, moving away from the televised final format Eurosong. However, the national final was later confirmed as the intended selection method for the Irish entry in the 2024 contest.

== Before Eurovision ==
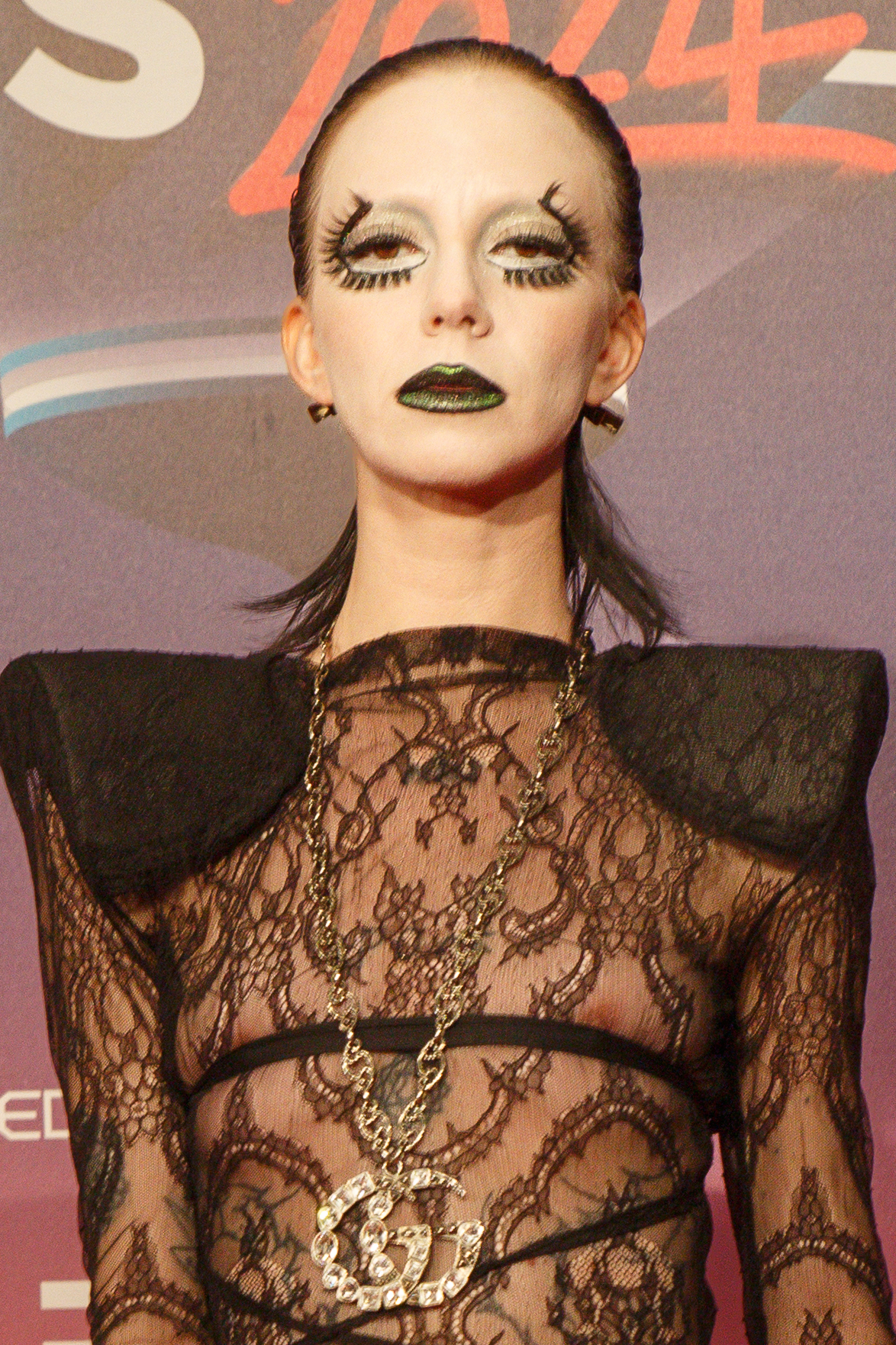
Bambie Thug, winner of Eurosong 2024, at the PrePartyES event in Madrid

=== Eurosong 2024 ===
Eurosong 2024 was the national final format developed by RTÉ in order to select its entry for the Eurovision Song Contest 2024. It was held on 26 January 2024 during a special edition of The Late Late Show, broadcast on RTÉ One and RTÉ Player and hosted by Patrick Kielty.

==== Competing entries ====
On 15 June 2023, RTÉ opened a submission period where artists and composers would be able to submit their entries for the competition until 29 September 2023; shortly before the closing, the deadline was extended until the following 20 October. In late November 2023, head of delegation Michael Kealy revealed that around 378 entries had been received.

The competing entries were selected by a jury panel with members appointed by RTÉ among music industry professionals and Eurovision fans and presided by Kealy, both from the received submissions and by direct invitation of established artists. In the first phase of the process, less than 60 entries were shortlisted. Four finalists were selected from these based on the ten favourites of each jury member, and an additional two through a "fast-track" procedure. They were revealed daily between 8 and 12 January 2024 on The Ray D'Arcy Show, broadcast on RTÉ Radio 1.

Artist	Song	Songwriter(s)
Ailsha	"Go Tobann"	Ailsha Davey; Peadar Connolly-Davey
Bambie Thug	"Doomsday Blue"	Bambie Ray Robinson; Olivia Cassy Brooking; Sam Matlock; Tyler Ryder
Erica-Cody	"Love Me like I Do"	Aimée Fitzpatrick; Erica-Cody Kennedy Smith; Richey McCourt; Ruth-Anne Cunningham
Isabella Kearney	"Let Me Be the Fire"	Isabella Kearney-Nurse; Megan Redmond; Mich Hedin Hansen; Rasmus Gregersen
JyellowL feat. Toshín	"Judas"	Allen Roberts; Gavin Wigglesworth; Jake Gosling; Jean-Luc Uddoh; Matthew Brettle; Sammy Soso; Tosin Bankole
Next in Line	"Love like Us"	Bill Maybury; Conor Davis; Conor O'Farrell; Harry O'Connell; Joe Rubel; Joshua Regala; Neung Kelly

==== Final ====
The final of Eurosong 2024 took place at the RTÉ Television Centre on 26 January 2024. The results were determined by a combination of votes from a national jury, an international jury and a televote – each awarding sets of 2, 4, 6, 8, 10 and 12 points – with the latter taking precedence in the event of a tie in the first place. The international jury panel consisted of Luxembourgish head of delegation Eric Lehmann, Finnish executive producer Anssi Autio of Yle, Austrian music manager Kerstin Breyer and British journalist Deban Aderemi of Wiwibloggs, while the national jury panel consisted of songwriter Niall Mooney, radio DJ Tara Murray, music consultant Elaine McCann and RTÉ 2fm presenter Tracy Clifford; the televote points were announced by 2022 Irish representative Brooke Scullion. During the show, Ukrainian group Kalush Orchestra performed their 2022 winning song "Stefania" as a guest act. Bambie Thug with "Doomsday Blue" was proclaimed the winner with a total of 32 points, having received the top score from both the national jury and the public vote.

Final – 26 January 2024
R/O	Artist	Song	Jury		Televote	Total	Place
R/O	Artist	Song	Intl.	National	Televote	Total	Place
1	Isabella Kearney	"Let Me Be the Fire"	2	4	2	8	6
2	Bambie Thug	"Doomsday Blue"	8	12	12	32	1
3	JyellowL feat. Toshín	"Judas"	4	8	4	16	5
4	Ailsha	"Go Tobann"	6	10	8	24	2
5	Next in Line	"Love like Us"	12	2	10	24	2
6	Erica-Cody	"Love Me like I Do"	10	6	6	22	4

=== Promotion ===
As part of the promotion of their participation in the contest, Bambie Thug attended the PrePartyES in Madrid on 30 March 2024, the London Eurovision Party on 7 April 2024 and the Eurovision in Concert event in Amsterdam on 13 April 2024.

=== Calls for boycott ===
The inclusion of Israel in the list of participants of the 2024 contest, despite the humanitarian crisis resulting from Israeli military operations in the Gaza Strip during the Gaza war, sparked controversy in Ireland as well as several other participating countries, with calls and petitions for broadcasters to boycott the event. By mid-December 2023, RTÉ had received over 465 emails urging a boycott, to which RTÉ responded that it had always approached the event as "a non-political contest", with Michael Kealy adding that he would "go along" with any decision the European Broadcasting Union (EBU) would make. Labour Party TD Aodhán Ó Ríordáin called for Ireland to boycott the competition, while Taoiseach Leo Varadkar stated his opposition to a boycott. By mid-January, the number of emails received had risen to over 600. Shortly before the final, Eurosong participants Erica-Cody and eventual winner Bambie Thug expressed their opposition to Israel's participation; however, the former explained that she was still uncertain about boycotting the contest in case of victory, and the latter stated that the responsibility over the country's participation lay with the EBU rather than the artists. Since the Eurosong final, another 1,400 emails were received by early March, around 1,000 of which featuring the "same content, signed and sent by different emailers".

While not mentioning Israel's participation in the contest, on 29 March 2024, Bambie Thug released a joint statement with other Eurovision 2024 entrants – namely Gåte (Norway), Iolanda (Portugal), Megara (San Marino), Mustii (Belgium), Nemo (Switzerland), Olly Alexander (United Kingdom), Saba (Denmark), Silvester Belt (Lithuania) and Windows95man (Finland) – calling for "an immediate and lasting ceasefire" in Gaza as well as the return of the Israeli hostages held by Hamas. However, the singer added that their personal "stance on double standards remains firm", referring to earlier comparisons they had drawn with the exclusion of Russia from the 2022 contest following its invasion of Ukraine, and explained that if they had decided to boycott the event it would have meant "one less pro-Palestinian voice at the contest". After the final, Bambie Thug proclaimed in a press conference: "The EBU is not what the Eurovision is – fuck the EBU."

== At Eurovision ==
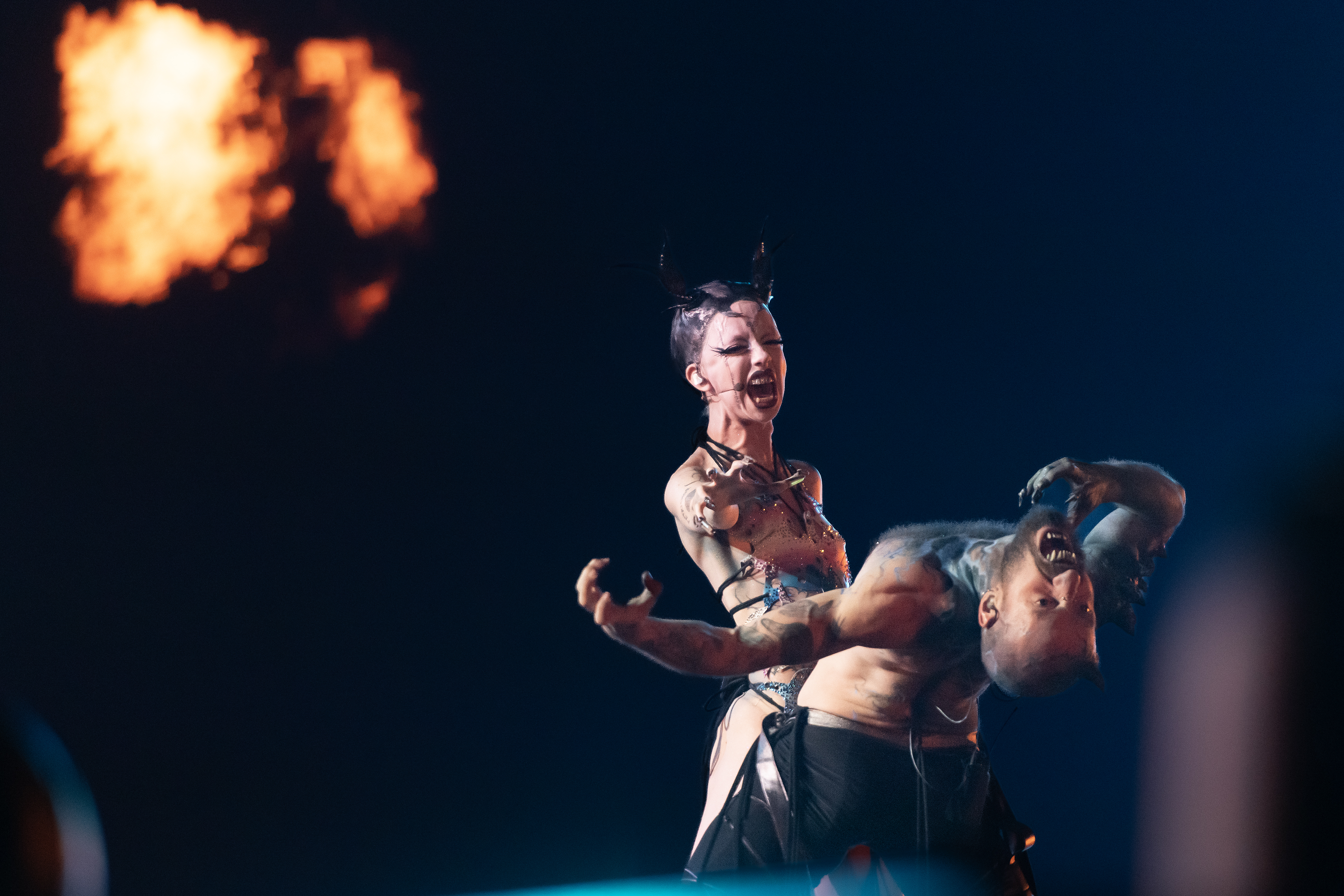
Bambie Thug during a rehearsal before the first semi-final.

The Eurovision Song Contest 2024 took place at the Malmö Arena in Malmö, Sweden, and consisted of two semi-finals held on the respective dates of 7 and 9 May and the final on 11 May 2024. All nations with the exceptions of the host country and the "Big Five" (France, Germany, Italy, Spain and the United Kingdom) were required to qualify from one of two semi-finals in order to compete in the final; the top ten countries from each semi-final progress to the final. On 30 January 2024, an allocation draw was held to determine which of the two semi-finals, as well as which half of the show, each country would perform in; the EBU split up the competing countries into different pots based on voting patterns from previous contests, with countries with favourable voting histories put into the same pot. Ireland was scheduled for the first half of the first semi-final. The shows' producers then decided the running order for the semi-finals; Ireland was set to perform in position 4.

In Ireland, the first semi-final and the final of the contest were broadcast on RTÉ One, and the second semi-final on RTÉ2, all with commentary by Marty Whelan; RTÉ 2fm also broadcast the first semi-final and the final, with commentary by Zbyszek Zalinski and Neil Doherty.

=== Performance ===
Bambie Thug took part in technical rehearsals on 27 April and 1 May, followed by dress rehearsals on 6 and 7 May. Their performance of "Doomsday Blue" at the contest is staged by Sergio Jaén and choreographed by Matt Williams, and sees the presence of a dancer as well as the usage of candles, smoke and flames. Bambie Thug's exterior outfit is black with horns, with Celtic triskelion-shaped nail extensions; halfway through the performance, the singer removes their gown, revealing an adherent outfit featuring the colours of the transgender flag. The singer performed in their first dress rehearsal with the words 'ceasefire' and 'freedom for Palestine' written in Ogham script on their face and leg; the EBU had them remove those messages from the costume in order "to protect the non-political nature of the event". Thug replaced the message in the costume with 'crown the witch', which was written in Ogham script on their forehead.

=== Semi-final ===
Ireland performed in position 4, following the entry from Lithuania and before the entry from Ukraine. At the end of the show, the country was announced as a qualifier for the final. It was later revealed that Ireland placed third out of the fifteen participating countries in the first semi-final with 124 points.

=== Final ===
Following the semi-final, Ireland was drawn to perform in the first half of the final. Ultimately, the country performed in position 10, following the entry from Estonia and before the entry from Latvia. Bambie Thug once again took part in dress rehearsals on 10 and 11 May before the final, including the jury final where the professional juries cast their final votes before the live show on 11 May. They performed a repeat of their semi-final performance during the final on 11 May. Ireland placed sixth in the final, scoring 278 points; 136 points from the public televoting and 142 points from the juries. This marked Ireland's best result in the contest since 2000.

=== Voting ===
Below is a breakdown of points awarded by and to Ireland in the first semi-final and in the final. Voting during the three shows involved each country awarding sets of points from 1-8, 10 and 12: one from their professional jury and the other from televoting in the final vote, while the semi-final vote was based entirely on the vote of the public. The Irish jury consisted of Tracy Clifford, Kim Hayden, Bill Hughes, Lisa Lambe, and Brian Sheil. In the first semi-final, Ireland placed 3rd with 124 points, marking Ireland's first qualification to the final since 2018. In the final, Ireland placed 6th with 278 points, the country's highest placing since 2000, and received twelve points in the jury vote from Australia. Over the course of the contest, Ireland awarded its 12 points to Lithuania in the first semi-final, and to Switzerland (jury) and Croatia (televote) in the final.

RTÉ appointed Paul Harrington, who won the 1994 contest for Ireland, as its spokesperson to announce the Irish jury's votes in the final.

==== Points awarded to Ireland ====
Points awarded to Ireland (Semi-final 1)
Score	Televote
12 points	
10 points	Australia; Rest of the World; United Kingdom
8 points	Finland; Lithuania; Poland; Ukraine
7 points	Portugal; Serbia
6 points	Azerbaijan; Croatia; Cyprus; Germany; Luxembourg; Sweden
5 points	Moldova
4 points	Slovenia
3 points	Iceland
2 points	
1 point	

Points awarded to Ireland (Final)
Score	Televote	Jury
12 points		Australia
10 points	United Kingdom	Azerbaijan; Italy; Portugal; Spain; Switzerland; Ukraine
8 points	Australia; Ukraine	Croatia
7 points	Rest of the World; Serbia; Spain	Czechia; Denmark; Iceland; Malta; San Marino; United Kingdom
6 points	Czechia; Netherlands; Poland	Finland
5 points	Croatia; Finland; Lithuania; Portugal	
4 points	Azerbaijan; Georgia; Malta; Norway; Sweden	Belgium
3 points	Denmark; Iceland; Italy; Latvia	Austria; Lithuania
2 points	Armenia; Austria; Belgium; Cyprus; Estonia; Greece; Moldova; San Marino; Slovenia	Serbia
1 point	Germany	Poland; Slovenia

==== Points awarded by Ireland ====
Points awarded by Ireland (Semi-final 1)
Score	Televote
12 points	Lithuania
10 points	Croatia
8 points	Ukraine
7 points	Poland
6 points	Luxembourg
5 points	Finland
4 points	Australia
3 points	Portugal
2 points	Moldova
1 point	Cyprus

Points awarded by Ireland (Final)
Score	Televote	Jury
12 points	Croatia	Switzerland
10 points	Israel	Sweden
8 points	Ukraine	Luxembourg
7 points	Lithuania	Croatia
6 points	Switzerland	Germany
5 points	Latvia	Portugal
4 points	France	United Kingdom
3 points	Finland	France
2 points	Spain	Ukraine
1 point	Italy	Serbia

==== Detailed voting results ====
Each participating broadcaster assembles a five-member jury panel consisting of music industry professionals who are citizens of the country they represent. Each jury, and individual jury member, is required to meet a strict set of criteria regarding professional background, as well as diversity in gender and age. No member of a national jury was permitted to be related in any way to any of the competing acts in such a way that they cannot vote impartially and independently. The individual rankings of each jury member as well as the nation's televoting results were released shortly after the grand final.

The following members comprised the Irish jury:

- Tracy Clifford
- Kim Hayden
- Bill Hughes
- Lisa Lambe
- Brian Sheil

Detailed voting results from Ireland (Semi-final 1)
R/O	Country	Televote	
R/O	Country	Rank	Points
01	Cyprus	10	1
02	Serbia	11	
03	Lithuania	1	12
04	Ireland		
05	Ukraine	3	8
06	Poland	4	7
07	Croatia	2	10
08	Iceland	12	
09	Slovenia	13	
10	Finland	6	5
11	Moldova	9	2
12	Azerbaijan	14	
13	Australia	7	4
14	Portugal	8	3
15	Luxembourg	5	6

Detailed voting results from Ireland (Final)
R/O	Country	Jury							Televote	
R/O	Country	Juror A	Juror B	Juror C	Juror D	Juror E	Rank	Points	Rank	Points
01	Sweden	3	2	3	2	9	2	10	21	
02	Ukraine	7	9	9	8	11	9	2	3	8
03	Germany	23	7	6	1	6	5	6	18	
04	Luxembourg	4	11	2	11	4	3	8	17	
~~05~~	~~Netherlands~~ ‡ (Note: The Netherlands was disqualified prior to the final.)	~~8~~	~~8~~	~~8~~	~~14~~	~~19~~	~~12~~		N/A	
06	Israel	24	25	18	5	23	16		2	10
07	Lithuania	13	12	11	20	5	13		4	7
08	Spain	20	13	16	19	7	18		9	2
09	Estonia	22	24	24	23	8	22		12	
10	Ireland									
11	Latvia	25	19	13	12	15	20		6	5
12	Greece	18	20	22	10	16	21		13	
13	United Kingdom	14	6	12	6	2	7	4	14	
14	Norway	9	14	23	13	17	19		20	
15	Italy	17	18	7	24	12	17		10	1
16	Serbia	10	22	15	3	18	10	1	23	
17	Finland	21	16	25	25	25	25		8	3
18	Portugal	5	5	14	9	3	6	5	19	
19	Armenia	12	21	20	22	21	24		11	
20	Cyprus	16	10	4	18	22	14		16	
21	Switzerland	1	1	5	15	1	1	12	5	6
22	Slovenia	11	23	21	4	24	15		24	
23	Croatia	2	17	1	16	10	4	7	1	12
24	Georgia	15	15	19	21	13	23		22	
25	France	6	4	17	7	14	8	3	7	4
26	Austria	19	3	10	17	20	11		15	
