= Rest of the World in the Eurovision Song Contest =

The flag used to represent the "Rest of the World" on the voting website of the Eurovision Song Contest.

In 2023, the Eurovision Song Contest introduced the "Rest of the World" vote, allowing viewers in non-participating countries to vote for the competing entries, with their votes aggregated and presented as a single set of points, equivalent to the points awarded by one participating country.

== Background and introduction ==
The flag used to represent the "Rest of the World" on the voting website of the Eurovision Song Contest between 2023 and 2025.

The first Eurovision event to allow viewers from outside the participating countries to vote was the Junior Eurovision Song Contest 2014. International viewers were invited to cast votes for their preferred entries through a dedicated website. The vote was intended to determine the recipient of a separate award and did not affect the contest results. However, the award was not ultimately presented after the voting website experienced technical problems.

In 2017, the Junior Eurovision Song Contest replaced traditional televoting with an online voting system that allows viewers to cast votes regardless of their location or country of residence. Jon Ola Sand, then-executive supervisor of both the Eurovision Song Contest and the Junior Eurovision Song Contest, subsequently stated that a similar system could be introduced for the former.

On 22 November 2022, the European Broadcasting Union (EBU) announced that, starting with the 2023 contest, viewers in non-participating countries would be eligible to vote in all shows. Their votes would be aggregated and presented as a single set of points under the designation "Rest of the World". Voting is conducted through the online platform Esc.vote, with voters required to provide a credit or debit card for verification.

The introduction of the "Rest of the World" vote resulted in a slight change to the weighting of the public and jury votes. The public accounts for approximately 51% of the overall result, compared with 49% for the jury, replacing the previous equal weighting.

== Voting ==
=== Points awarded by the Rest of the World ===
Points awarded by the Rest of the World in the Eurovision Song Contest 2023
Score	Semi-final 1	Semi-final 2	Final
12 points	Israel	Albania	Israel
10 points	Finland	Armenia	Finland
8 points	Latvia	Austria	Armenia
7 points	Sweden	Australia	Sweden
6 points	Portugal	Slovenia	Albania
5 points	Czechia	Belgium	Ukraine
4 points	Moldova	Lithuania	Norway
3 points	Croatia	Iceland	Croatia
2 points	Serbia	Estonia	Spain
1 point	Malta	Georgia	France

Points awarded by the Rest of the World in the Eurovision Song Contest 2024
Score	Semi-final 1	Semi-final 2	Final
12 points	Ukraine	Israel	Israel
10 points	Ireland	Netherlands	Ukraine
8 points	Croatia	Armenia	Croatia
7 points	Slovenia	Estonia	Ireland
6 points	Luxembourg	Switzerland	Switzerland
5 points	Lithuania	Greece	Armenia
4 points	Serbia	Georgia	Luxembourg
3 points	Portugal	Norway	Greece
2 points	Australia	San Marino	France
1 point	Finland	Czechia	Italy

Points awarded by the Rest of the World in the Eurovision Song Contest 2025
Score	Semi-final 1	Semi-final 2	Final
12 points	Albania	Israel	Israel
10 points	Ukraine	Latvia	Albania
8 points	Iceland	Czechia	Ukraine
7 points	Sweden	Greece	Greece
6 points	Poland	Finland	Sweden
5 points	Portugal	Lithuania	Finland
4 points	Estonia	Denmark	Poland
3 points	Norway	Malta	Spain
2 points	Croatia	Australia	Estonia
1 point	Netherlands	Ireland	Austria

Points awarded by the Rest of the World in the Eurovision Song Contest 2026
Score	Semi-final 1	Semi-final 2	Final
12 points	Moldova	Bulgaria	Bulgaria
10 points	Israel	Romania	Moldova
8 points	Poland	Ukraine	Ukraine
7 points	Serbia	Albania	Romania
6 points	Lithuania	Australia	Israel
5 points	Finland	Cyprus	Albania
4 points	Croatia	Czechia	Greece
3 points	Greece	Switzerland	Finland
2 points	Montenegro	Latvia	Australia
1 point	Belgium	Denmark	Poland

=== Detailed voting results ===
==== 2023 ====
Detailed voting results from the Rest of the World (Final)
R/O	Country	Rank	Points
01	Austria	13	
02	Portugal	20	
03	Switzerland	26	
04	Poland	23	
05	Serbia	22	
06	France	10	1
07	Cyprus	24	
08	Spain	9	2
09	Sweden	4	7
10	Albania	5	6
11	Italy	15	
12	Estonia	25	
13	Finland	2	10
14	Czechia	17	
15	Australia	12	
16	Belgium	14	
17	Armenia	3	8
18	Moldova	11	
19	Ukraine	6	5
20	Norway	7	4
21	Germany	16	
22	Lithuania	19	
23	Israel	1	12
24	Slovenia	18	
25	Croatia	8	3
26	United Kingdom	21	

==== 2024 ====
Detailed voting results from the Rest of the World (Semi-final 1)
R/O	Country	Rank	Points
01	Cyprus	13	
02	Serbia	7	4
03	Lithuania	6	5
04	Ireland	2	10
05	Ukraine	1	12
06	Poland	12	
07	Croatia	3	8
08	Iceland	15	
09	Slovenia	4	7
10	Finland	10	1
11	Moldova	14	
12	Azerbaijan	11	
13	Australia	9	2
14	Portugal	8	3
15	Luxembourg	5	6

Detailed voting results from the Rest of the World (Semi-final 2)
R/O	Country	Rank	Points
01	Malta	12	
02	Albania	16	
03	Greece	6	5
04	Switzerland	5	6
05	Czechia	10	1
06	Austria	13	
07	Denmark	15	
08	Armenia	3	8
09	Latvia	14	
10	San Marino	9	2
11	Georgia	7	4
12	Belgium	11	
13	Estonia	4	7
14	Israel	1	12
15	Norway	8	3
16	Netherlands	2	10

Detailed voting results from the Rest of the World (Final)
R/O	Country	Rank	Points
01	Sweden	21	
02	Ukraine	2	10
03	Germany	14	
04	Luxembourg	7	4
~~05~~	~~Netherlands~~ ‡ (Note: The Netherlands was disqualified prior to the final.)		
06	Israel	1	12
07	Lithuania	13	
08	Spain	11	
09	Estonia	16	
10	Ireland	4	7
11	Latvia	18	
12	Greece	8	3
13	United Kingdom	17	
14	Norway	19	
15	Italy	10	1
16	Serbia	15	
17	Finland	12	
18	Portugal	24	
19	Armenia	6	5
20	Cyprus	23	
21	Switzerland	5	6
22	Slovenia	25	
23	Croatia	3	8
24	Georgia	20	
25	France	9	2
26	Austria	22	

==== 2025 ====
Detailed voting results from the Rest of the World (Semi-final 1)
R/O	Country	Rank	Points
01	Iceland	3	8
02	Poland	5	6
03	Slovenia	15	
04	Estonia	7	4
05	Ukraine	2	10
06	Sweden	4	7
07	Portugal	6	5
08	Norway	8	3
09	Belgium	14	
10	Azerbaijan	11	
11	San Marino	12	
12	Albania	1	12
13	Netherlands	10	1
14	Croatia	9	2
15	Cyprus	13	

Detailed voting results from the Rest of the World (Semi-final 2)
R/O	Country	Rank	Points
01	Australia	9	2
02	Montenegro	14	
03	Ireland	10	1
04	Latvia	2	10
05	Armenia	12	
06	Austria	13	
07	Greece	4	7
08	Lithuania	6	5
09	Malta	8	3
10	Georgia	16	
11	Denmark	7	4
12	Czechia	3	8
13	Luxembourg	11	
14	Israel	1	12
15	Serbia	15	
16	Finland	5	6

Detailed voting results from the Rest of the World (Final)
R/O	Country	Rank	Points
01	Norway	20	
02	Luxembourg	21	
03	Estonia	9	2
04	Israel	1	12
05	Lithuania	15	
06	Spain	8	3
07	Ukraine	3	8
08	United Kingdom	23	
09	Austria	10	1
10	Iceland	13	
11	Latvia	14	
12	Netherlands	18	
13	Finland	6	5
14	Italy	16	
15	Poland	7	4
16	Germany	17	
17	Greece	4	7
18	Armenia	11	
19	Switzerland	25	
20	Malta	12	
21	Portugal	24	
22	Denmark	22	
23	Sweden	5	6
24	France	19	
25	San Marino	26	
26	Albania	2	10

==== 2026 ====
Detailed voting results from the Rest of the World (Semi-final 1)
R/O	Country	Rank	Points
01	Moldova	1	12
02	Sweden	11	
03	Croatia	7	4
04	Greece	8	3
05	Portugal	12	
06	Georgia	15	
07	Finland	6	5
08	Montenegro	9	2
09	Estonia	14	
10	Israel	2	10
11	Belgium	10	1
12	Lithuania	5	6
13	San Marino	13	
14	Poland	3	8
15	Serbia	4	7

Detailed voting results from the Rest of the World (Semi-final 2)
R/O	Country	Rank	Points
01	Bulgaria	1	12
02	Azerbaijan	15	
03	Romania	2	10
04	Luxembourg	14	
05	Czechia	7	4
06	Armenia	11	
07	Switzerland	8	3
08	Cyprus	6	5
09	Latvia	9	2
10	Denmark	10	1
11	Australia	5	6
12	Ukraine	3	8
13	Albania	4	7
14	Malta	12	
15	Norway	13	

Detailed voting results from the Rest of the World (Final)
R/O	Country	Rank	Points
01	Denmark	14	
02	Germany	25	
03	Israel	5	6
04	Belgium	23	
05	Albania	6	5
06	Greece	7	4
07	Ukraine	3	8
08	Australia	9	2
09	Serbia	12	
10	Malta	21	
11	Czechia	18	
12	Bulgaria	1	12
13	Croatia	11	
14	United Kingdom	22	
15	France	17	
16	Moldova	2	10
17	Finland	8	3
18	Poland	10	1
19	Lithuania	15	
20	Sweden	19	
21	Cyprus	16	
22	Italy	13	
23	Norway	20	
24	Romania	4	7
25	Austria	24	

== Contributing countries ==
Since the introduction of the "Rest of the World" vote in 2023, the EBU has annually published, in no particular order, a list of around ten non-participating countries that received the highest total number of votes across the live shows. As of 2026, seven countries have appeared on the list in every edition in which the vote has been used: Canada, Hungary, Mexico, Slovakia, Turkey, the United Arab Emirates, and the United States. Hungary, Slovakia, and Turkey have all previously competed in the contest; Hungary last took part in 2019, while Slovakia and Turkey last took part in 2012.

Table key
X	Appeared in the top voting countries list – Countries identified by the EBU as being among those that contributed the highest number of votes to the "Rest of the World" result across all shows in that year's edition
X	Previously participated – Countries that had participated in the contest in the past, but not in the respective edition, and which were among those contributing the highest number of votes to the "Rest of the World" result across all live shows
	Did not appear in the top 10 list – Countries that may have voted as part of the "Rest of the World", but were not identified by the EBU as being among the countries contributing the highest number of votes
-	Ineligible – Countries that were unable to vote as part of the "Rest of the World" as they participated in the contest in that edition and therefore voted independently

Country	2023	2024	2025	2026
Bulgaria		X		-
Canada	X	X	X	X
Chile	X			
Hungary	X	X	X	X
Ireland	-	-	-	X
Kosovo	X		X	
Luxembourg	X	-	-	-
Mexico	X	X	X	X
Netherlands	-	-	-	X
New Zealand	X			
Romania	-	X	X	-
Slovakia	X	X	X	X
South Africa		X	X	
Spain	-	-	-	X
Turkey	X	X	X	X
United Arab Emirates	X	X	X	X
United States	X	X	X	X
Total no. of countries/territories that voted (Note: The number of participating countries has been subtracted from the total, as the figures published by the EBU include countries competing in the contest, which are ineligible to vote as part of the "Rest of the World".)	107	119	109	113

The following countries and territories were listed by the EBU and its voting partner Once as having contributed to the "Rest of the World" vote in 2026:

Key
†	Former participating countries – Countries that have participated at the Eurovision Song Contest that were identified by the EBU as being among those that contributed to the "Rest of the World" result (2026)

- Angola
- Antigua and Barbuda
- Argentina
- Bahamas
- Bahrain
- Bangladesh
- Belarus †
- Belize
- Benin
- Bolivia
- Bosnia and Herzegovina †
- Botswana
- Brazil
- Brunei
- Cambodia
- Cameroon
- Canada
- Cape Verde
- Chile
- China
- Colombia
- Costa Rica
- Dominican Republic
- DR Congo
- Ecuador
- Egypt
- El Salvador
- Equatorial Guinea
- Fiji
- Ghana
- Grenada
- Guatemala
- Honduras
- Hong Kong
- Hungary †
- Iceland †
- India
- Indonesia
- Iraq
- Ireland †
- Ivory Coast
- Jamaica
- Japan
- Jordan
- Kazakhstan
- Kenya
- Kuwait
- Kyrgyzstan
- Lebanon
- Liberia
- Libya
- Malaysia
- Mauritius
- Mexico
- Mongolia
- Morocco †
- Mozambique
- Namibia
- Netherlands †
- New Zealand
- Nicaragua
- Nigeria
- North Macedonia †
- Oman
- Pakistan
- Palestine
- Panama
- Paraguay
- Peru
- Philippines
- Puerto Rico
- Qatar
- Russia †
- Rwanda
- Saudi Arabia
- Senegal
- Seychelles
- Singapore
- Slovakia †
- Slovenia †
- South Africa
- South Korea
- Spain †
- Sri Lanka
- Taiwan
- Tajikistan
- Tanzania
- Thailand
- Timor-Leste
- Trinidad and Tobago
- Tunisia
- Turkey †
- Uganda
- United Arab Emirates
- United States
- Uruguay
- Uzbekistan
- Venezuela
- Vietnam
- Zambia
- Zimbabwe
