= JyellowL =

- Born: Jean-Luc Adenrele Ibrahim Koko Uddoh; 1998 (age 27–28); Benin City, Nigeria
- Genre: Hip hop
- Occupation: Rapper
- Years active: 2016–present
- Label: JYellowL Records

Jean-Luc Adenrele Ibrahim Koko Uddoh (born 1998), known by the stage name JyellowL (pronounced "J-yellow-L"), is a Nigerian-Irish rapper.

== Early and personal life ==
Uddoh was born in Nigeria to a family of Nigerian and Afro-Jamaican ancestry. He lived with his father in Benin City before moving to Blanchardstown, Ireland aged 14 to live with his mother. He attended Luttrellstown Community College and The Institute of Education and studied for a politics degree at University College Dublin.

He was involved in organising Irish Black Lives Matter protests.

== Career ==
JyellowL began performing in 2016, and performed at the 2018 Longitude Festival. He cites Fela Kuti, Damien Marley, Erykah Badu and 2Pac as influences.

JyellowL's music was featured in the video game FIFA 20 and on the TV show Normal People; he also appeared on BBC Three's Rap Trip. His 2020 debut album 2020 DIVision was nominated for the Choice Music Prize.

He was selected to compete in the Irish national final for the Eurovision Song Contest 2024 with the song "Judas", ultimately coming fifth.

== Discography ==
=== Albums ===
List of EPs, with selected details
Title	Details
Bulletproof	Released: October 2017; Label: JyellowL
2020 D|Vision	Released: November 2020; Label: JyellowL

=== Extended plays ===
List of EPs, with selected details
Title	Details
Me n Me Too	Released: November 2018; Label: JyellowL
Love & Light	Released: October 2021; Label: JyellowL
Shades of Yellow	Released: April 2023; Label: JyellowL
