= Cassyette =

English singer-songwriter

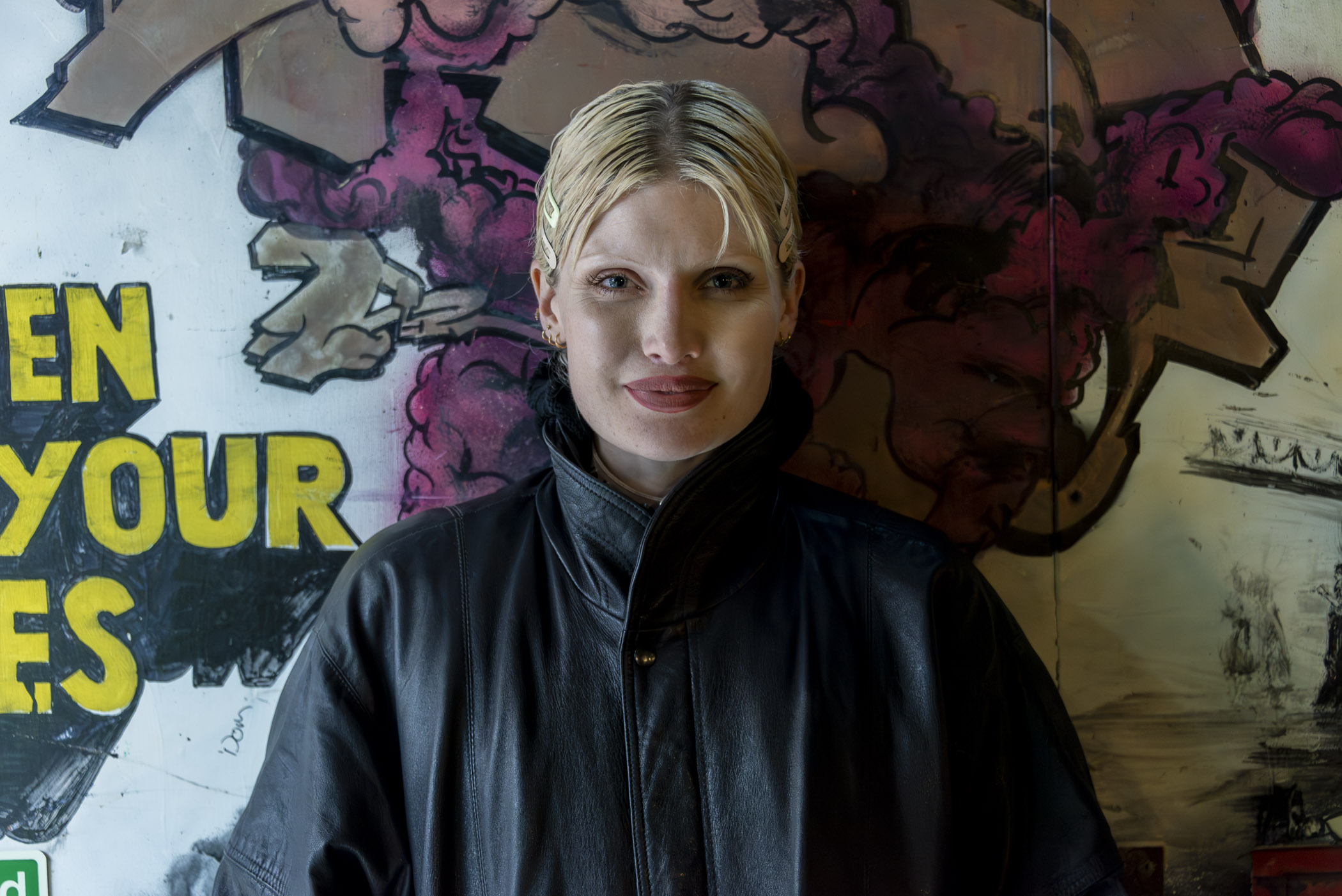
- Cassyette photographed in Brighton in May 2025

Background information
- Born: 30 March 1993 (age 32); Chelmsford, Essex, England
- Genres: Electro pop, rock, pop
- Occupations: Singer-songwriter, DJ (occasional events)
- Instrument: Vocals
- Website: www.cassyette.co.uk

Cassyette, is an English singer-songwriter. Described as "a modern alternative icon" (by Kerrang) "with a sound that calls to arms" (by MTV), Cassyette took the main stage at her festival debut at Download 2021, performing alongside headline slot Frank Carter & the Rattlesnakes. In 2022, she toured Europe with Sum 41 and supported My Chemical Romance on their comeback tour. Most recently, as of 2024, she has been one of three acts supporting Bring Me the Horizon on their NX_GN WRLD TOUR.

== Early life ==
Born in Chelmsford, Cassyette attended Brentwood Ursuline Convent High School. She studied music at the University of Westminster.

Cassyette began her career as a DJ and songwriter. After university, she "became a staple on the London live circuit".

== Career ==
Songwriting for various artists and bands alongside her own music, Cassyette merges pop and rock inspired sounds with modern-day electronic pop. Cassyette's first solo debut, Push n Pull, was labelled "a seriously well-crafted, addictive gem that should underline Cassyette's reputation as not only one of London's most relevant new artists, but a consummate beat maker and songwriter" by Niji Magazine.

Cassyette made her festival debut at the 2021 Download Pilot festival, also making a guest appearance alongside Frank Carter & the Rattlesnakes on their headlining slot.

Cassyette co-wrote and performed backing vocals for "Doomsday Blue", the Irish entry for the Eurovision Song Contest 2024, performed by Bambie Thug.

She was one of the support acts for Bryan Adams's So Happy It Hurts tour in 2024.

== Discography ==
=== Albums ===
List of studio albums, with selected chart positions
Title	Album details	Peak chart positions	
Title	Album details	UK	SCO
This World Fucking Sucks	Released: 23 August 2024; Label: 23 Recordings	39	7

=== Extended plays ===
List of EPs, with selected details
Title	Details
Sad Girl	Released: 10 November 2022; Label: Devil Land
