= Electronic metal =

Electronic metal may refer to:

- Coldwave, a subgenre of industrial metal that merges various musical styles and includes synthesizer accompaniment; not to be confused with French coldwave
- Digital hardcore, synth-punk mixed with hardcore punk with influences from heavy metal music and noise rock
- Dungeon synth, synth-metal fused with black metal and dark ambient
- Electronic rock
- Electronicore, synth-metal mixed with metalcore
- Electrogrind, synth-metal mixed with grindcore
- Industrial metal
- Metalstep, various heavy metal styles such as nu metal mixed with a number of electronic dance genres such as dubstep and grime
- Neue Deutsche Härte, an industrial metal subgenre born in Germany in the 1990s and the 2000s
- Nintendocore, video game/chiptune and post-hardcore music mixed with heavy metal
- Synth-metal
