= United Kingdom in the Eurovision Song Contest 2024 =

- Eurovision Song Contest 2024
- Participating broadcaster: British Broadcasting Corporation (BBC)
- Country: United Kingdom
- Selection process: Internal selection
- Announcement date: Artist: 16 December 2023; Song: 1 March 2024

Competing entry
- Song: "Dizzy"
- Artist: Olly Alexander
- Songwriters: Oliver Alexander Thornton; Daniel Harle

Placement
- Final result: 18th, 46 points

Participation chronology

The United Kingdom was represented at the Eurovision Song Contest 2024 with the song "Dizzy" written by Olly Alexander and Daniel Harle, and performed by Olly Alexander himself. The British participating broadcaster, the British Broadcasting Corporation (BBC), internally selected both the song and the performer.

As a member of the "Big Five", the United Kingdom automatically qualified to compete in the final of the Eurovision Song Contest. Performing in position 13, the United Kingdom placed eighteenth out of the 25 performing countries with 46 points.

== Background ==
Prior to the 2024 contest, the British Broadcasting Corporation (BBC) has participated in the Eurovision Song Contest representing the United Kingdom sixty-five times since its first entry in 1957. Thus far, it has won the contest five times: in 1967 with the song "Puppet on a String" performed by Sandie Shaw, in 1969 with the song "Boom Bang-a-Bang" performed by Lulu, in 1976 with "Save Your Kisses for Me" performed by Brotherhood of Man, in 1981 with the song "Making Your Mind Up" performed by Bucks Fizz and in 1997 with the song "Love Shine a Light" performed by Katrina and the Waves. After its latest win, it has failed to be consistently successful, only reaching the top ten four times: in 1998, 2002, 2009, and 2022; and ending last five times: in 2003 (the first time in the country's history in the contest), 2008, 2010, 2019, and 2021. In 2023, it was represented by "I Wrote a Song" performed by Mae Muller, which finished in 25th place. The United Kingdom is the country that has hosted the contest the most times, with nine in total (in 1960, 1963, 1968, 1972, 1974, 1977, 1982, 1998, and 2023).

As part of its duties as participating broadcaster, the BBC organises the selection of its entry in the Eurovision Song Contest and broadcasts the event in the country. The broadcaster has used various methods to select its entry: From 1957 to 2010, it organised a national final which featured a competition among several artists and songs to choose its entry for the contest. Between 2011 and 2015, the BBC opted to internally select its entry. For its 2016 entry, the broadcaster announced that a national final would be organised again. The same process was used in 2017 and 2018, and changes were brought in for 2019. From 2020, the BBC opted to return to an internal selection.

== Before Eurovision ==
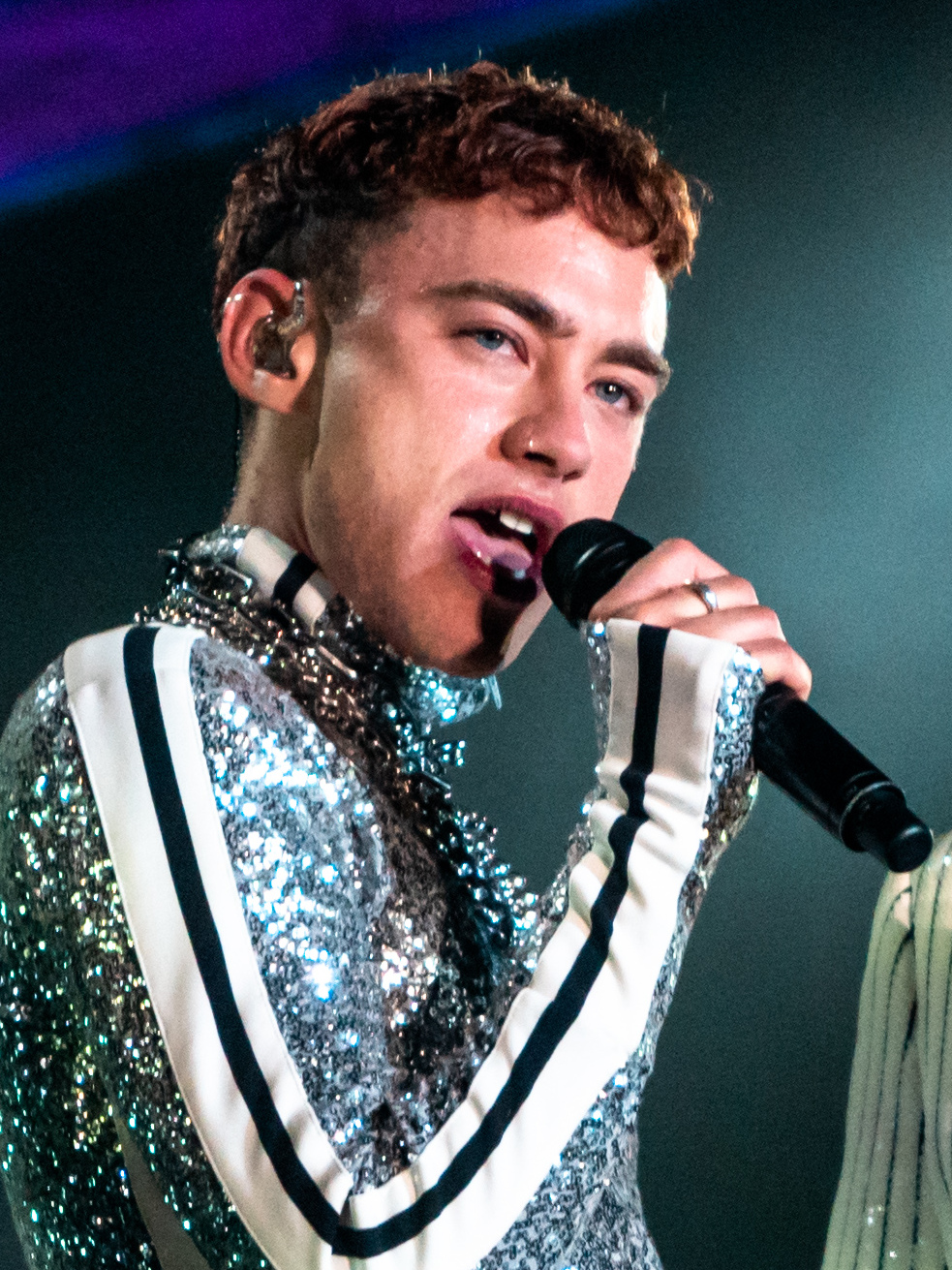
Olly Alexander (pictured in 2019) was internally selected by the BBC.

=== Internal selection ===
On 1 August 2023, TaP Music, the label with which the BBC had collaborated to internally select the British act in 2022 and 2023, announced that it had terminated their partnership with the broadcaster. On 24 August, the head of entertainment at BBC, Kalpna Patel-Knight, commented on the news, indicating that the broadcaster's intention was to look for another specialist team for 2024.

On 17 October 2023, the BBC revealed that executive producer Lee Smithurst and Will Wilkin, commissioning executive at BBC Music, had led the search for both the 2024 act and song during the summer. By October, Olly Alexander was selected, which the artist himself announced during the final of the 21st series of Strictly Come Dancing on 16 December. His song for the contest, titled "Dizzy" and co-written with Danny L Harle, was released on 1 March 2024. Later that evening, Alexander appeared on a special broadcast on BBC One, titled Graham Meets Olly, where he was interviewed by Graham Norton, followed by the first full televised broadcast of the song's music video.

=== Preparation and promotion ===
On 16 February 2024, Alexander travelled to Tbilisi, where he met with Georgian representative Nutsa Buzaladze before filming the music video for "Dizzy" in the country.

Following the release of "Dizzy", Alexander made appearances on BBC Radio 1 and BBC Radio 2, where the song received its radio premiere on The Radio 2 Breakfast Show with Zoe Ball. Alexander performed "Dizzy" live on Ant & Dec's Saturday Night Takeaway on 9 March 2024, as part of the End of the Show Show segment. The day prior to this performance, 8 March 2024, Alexander performed "Dizzy" for Vevo's Live from Vevo Studio series. In late April 2024, he travelled to New York, where he was a guest on The Kelly Clarkson Show. On 1 May 2024, the singer made a cameo appearance on an episode of the soap opera EastEnders, where he was seen rehearsing his Eurovision performance.

As part of the promotion of his participation in the contest, Alexander attended the London Eurovision Party on 7 April 2024 as the headline act, as well as the PrePartyES in Madrid on 30 March 2024, the Eurovision in Concert event in Amsterdam on 13 April 2024, and the Nordic Eurovision Party in Stockholm on 14 April 2024.

=== Controversy ===
After his reveal as the British entrant for the contest, it emerged that, in October, Alexander had signed a letter by LGBT association Voices4London which accused Israel – one of the participating countries – of committing apartheid against Palestinians and "Zionist propaganda" of pinkwashing the Israeli occupation of Palestinian territories. The Israeli embassy in London, as well as spokespeople of the Israeli government in the UK, criticised Alexander's views as "biased" and the BBC for "sending an entrant to Eurovision who espouses [...] partial views of Israel and promotes [...] dehumanising language of Israelis". The BBC commented that it was not in a position to cut ties with someone who is not a journalist over their personal use of social media, thereby confirming Alexander as the 2024 UK representative. The incident occurred in the backdrop of the Gaza war, which led to calls for Israel to be excluded from the contest.

On 29 March 2024, Alexander released a joint statement with other Eurovision 2024 entrants – namely Bambie Thug (Ireland), Gåte (Norway), Iolanda (Portugal), Megara (San Marino), Mustii (Belgium), Nemo (Switzerland), Saba (Denmark), Silvester Belt (Lithuania) and Windows95man (Finland) – calling for "an immediate and lasting ceasefire" in Gaza as well as the return of the Israeli hostages held by Hamas. Alexander received criticism over his refusal to boycott the contest despite Israel's participation, and a dedicated petition was signed by over 450 queer artists, with a protest calling for his withdrawal subsequently taking place outside Outernet London on the day of the London Eurovision Party. In an interview with The Times on 2 May 2024, the singer claimed to have experienced severe stress on the occasion, "trying not to have a breakdown" and feeling "ashamed of [himself] and embarrassed", while reiterating that he would participate as his withdrawal would not "make a difference" with regard to the humanitarian and hostage crises.

== At Eurovision ==
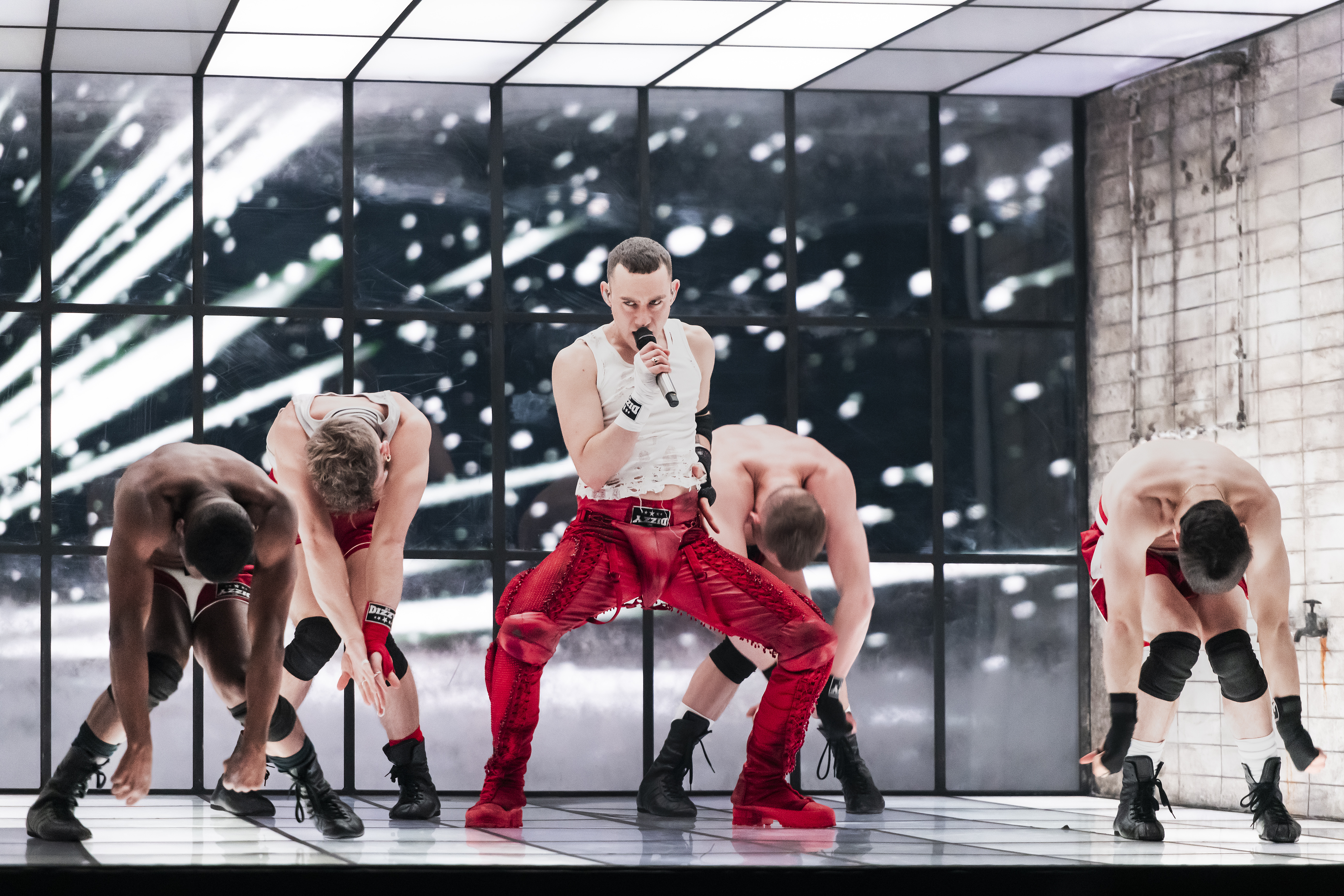
Olly Alexander during a rehearsal before the final.

The Eurovision Song Contest 2024 took place at Malmö Arena in Malmö, Sweden. It consisted of two semi-finals held on 7 and 9 May, respectively, and the final on 11 May 2024. All nations with the exceptions of the host country and the "Big Five" (France, Germany, Italy, Spain and the United Kingdom) were required to qualify from one of two semi-finals in order to compete in the final; the top ten countries from each semi-final progressed to the final. As a member of the "Big Five", the United Kingdom automatically qualified to compete in the final on 11 May 2024, but was also required to broadcast and vote in one of the two semi-finals. This was decided via a draw held during the semi-final allocation draw on 30 January 2024, when it was announced that the United Kingdom would be voting in the first semi-final. For the first time for a contest held outside of the United Kingdom, the BBC made the draw available on its online platform BBC iPlayer. Despite being an automatic qualifier for the final, the British entry was also performed during the semi-final. On 4 May 2024, a draw was held to determine which half of the final each "Big Five" country would perform in; the United Kingdom drew to perform in the first half of the show.

The BBC broadcast all three shows of the contest on BBC One and BBC iPlayer, with semi-final commentary by Scott Mills and Rylan Clark and final commentary by Graham Norton, as well as on BBC Radio 2 and BBC Sounds, with semi-final commentary by Richie Anderson and final commentary by Mills and Clark, and on BBC Red Button with British Sign Language interpreters. In addition, as part of the Eurovision programming, the BBC cooperated with DR and SVT alongside other EBU member broadcasters – namely ARD/WDR, ČT, ERR, France Télévisions, NRK, NTR, RÚV, VRT, and Yle – to produce and air a documentary titled ABBA – Against the Odds, on the occasion of the 50th anniversary of Sweden's first victory at the contest with "Waterloo" by ABBA. The BBC also rebroadcast the 1974 contest in full as part of the anniversary celebrations; the contest aired on BBC Four on 7 April 2024 and was preceded by an introduction from 2023 co-host Hannah Waddingham. A BBC-produced documentary following Alexander's Eurovision journey premiered during the week of the contest.

=== Performance ===
Olly Alexander took part in technical rehearsals on 2 and 4 May, followed by dress rehearsals on 10 and 11 May. The theme of his performance of "Dizzy" at the contest is set around a "post-apocalyptic dystopian boxing gym locker room, aboard a spaceship hurtling toward Earth through a black hole in 1985", with four male backing dancers and the singer himself dressed in red boxing gear.

=== Final ===
On 4 May 2024, a draw was held to determine which half of the final each "Big Five" country would perform in; the United Kingdom drew to perform in the first half of the show. The United Kingdom performed in position 13, following the entry from Greece and before the entry from Norway. Olly Alexander once again took part in dress rehearsals on 10 and 11 May before the final, including the jury final where the professional juries cast their final votes before the live show on 11 May. He performed a repeat of his semi-final performance during the final on 11 May. The United Kingdom placed eighteenth in the final, scoring 46 points, all of which came from the juries.

=== Voting ===
Below is a breakdown of points awarded to and by the United Kingdom in the first semi-final and in the final. Voting during the three shows involved each country awarding sets of points from 1-8, 10 and 12: one from their professional jury and the other from televoting in the final vote, while the semi-final vote was based entirely on the vote of the public. The UK jury consisted of Maia Beth, Adam Murray, Louise Redknapp, Rika, and Kojo Samuel. In the final, the United Kingdom placed 18th with 46 points. Over the course of the contest, the UK awarded its 12 points to Lithuania in the first semi-final, and to Portugal (jury) and Israel (televote) in the final.

The BBC appointed Joanna Lumley as its spokesperson to announce the British jury's votes in the final.

==== Points awarded to the United Kingdom ====
Points awarded to the United Kingdom (Final)
Score	Televote	Jury
12 points		
10 points		
8 points		Iceland; Sweden
7 points		
6 points		Belgium
5 points		
4 points		Australia; Ireland; Portugal; Serbia
3 points		Latvia; Switzerland
2 points		Spain
1 point		

==== Points awarded by the United Kingdom ====
Points awarded by the United Kingdom (Semi-final 1)
Score	Televote
12 points	Lithuania
10 points	Ireland
8 points	Croatia
7 points	Ukraine
6 points	Poland
5 points	Australia
4 points	Finland
3 points	Luxembourg
2 points	Portugal
1 point	Cyprus

Points awarded by the United Kingdom (Final)
Score	Televote	Jury
12 points	Israel	Portugal
10 points	Ireland	Switzerland
8 points	Lithuania	Croatia
7 points	Croatia	Ireland
6 points	Ukraine	Sweden
5 points	Switzerland	Italy
4 points	Latvia	Luxembourg
3 points	Finland	Latvia
2 points	France	Germany
1 point	Greece	Cyprus

==== Detailed voting results ====
Each participating broadcaster assembles a five-member jury panel consisting of music industry professionals who are citizens of the country they represent. Each jury, and individual jury member, is required to meet a strict set of criteria regarding professional background, as well as diversity in gender and age. No member of a national jury was permitted to be related in any way to any of the competing acts in such a way that they cannot vote impartially and independently. The individual rankings of each jury member as well as the nation's televoting results were released shortly after the grand final.

The following members comprised the British jury:

- Maia Beth
- Chandrika Darbari (Rika)
- Adam Murray
- Louise Redknapp
- Kojo Samuel

Detailed voting results from United Kingdom (Semi-final 1)
R/O	Country	Televote	
R/O	Country	Rank	Points
01	Cyprus	10	1
02	Serbia	14	
03	Lithuania	1	12
04	Ireland	2	10
05	Ukraine	4	7
06	Poland	5	6
07	Croatia	3	8
08	Iceland	11	
09	Slovenia	13	
10	Finland	7	4
11	Moldova	12	
12	Azerbaijan	15	
13	Australia	6	5
14	Portugal	9	2
15	Luxembourg	8	3

Detailed voting results from the United Kingdom (Final)
R/O	Country	Jury							Televote	
R/O	Country	Juror A	Juror B	Juror C	Juror D	Juror E	Rank	Points	Rank	Points
01	Sweden	9	5	3	11	6	5	6	18	
02	Ukraine	14	11	6	10	21	13		5	6
03	Germany	11	20	10	3	12	9	2	17	
04	Luxembourg	6	15	5	5	8	7	4	19	
~~05~~	~~Netherlands~~ ‡ (Note: The Netherlands was disqualified prior to the final.)	~~18~~	~~2~~	~~24~~	~~25~~	~~20~~	~~12~~		N/A	
06	Israel	17	23	9	6	24	15		1	12
07	Lithuania	8	17	11	19	5	11		3	8
08	Spain	24	19	20	22	22	24		11	
09	Estonia	25	18	21	24	16	23		16	
10	Ireland	12	1	15	8	4	4	7	2	10
11	Latvia	4	6	7	7	23	8	3	7	4
12	Greece	21	22	18	21	11	21		10	1
13	United Kingdom									
14	Norway	23	24	22	20	25	25		20	
15	Italy	7	7	4	4	18	6	5	12	
16	Serbia	10	16	17	14	17	18		23	
17	Finland	19	14	23	23	13	22		8	3
18	Portugal	2	3	1	2	3	1	12	21	
19	Armenia	20	9	14	12	15	17		14	
20	Cyprus	13	13	8	9	7	10	1	13	
21	Switzerland	1	10	2	1	2	2	10	6	5
22	Slovenia	5	12	16	16	14	14		24	
23	Croatia	3	4	13	13	1	3	8	4	7
24	Georgia	15	21	12	15	19	19		22	
25	France	16	25	25	17	10	20		9	2
26	Austria	22	8	19	18	9	16		15	
