= Lithuania in the Eurovision Song Contest 2024 =

- Eurovision Song Contest 2024
- Participating broadcaster: Lithuanian National Radio and Television (LRT)
- Country: Lithuania
- Selection process: Eurovizija.LT 2024
- Selection date: Semi-finals: 13 January 2024; 20 January 2024; 27 January 2024; 3 February 2024; 10 February 2024; Final: 17 February 2024

Competing entry
- Song: "Luktelk"
- Artist: Silvester Belt
- Songwriters: Džesika Šyvokaitė; Elena Jurgaitytė; Silvestras Beltė

Placement
- Semi-final result: Qualified (4th, 119 points)
- Final result: 14th, 90 points

Participation chronology

Lithuania was represented at the Eurovision Song Contest 2024 with the song "Luktelk", written by Silvestras Beltė, Džesika Šyvokaitė, and Elena Jurgaitytė, and performed by Beltė himself under his stage name Silvester Belt. The Lithuanian participating broadcaster, Lithuanian National Radio and Television (LRT), organised the national final Eurovizija.LT 2024 in order to select its entry at the contest.

Lithuania was drawn to compete in the first semi-final of the Eurovision Song Contest which took place on 7 May 2024 and was later selected to perform in position 3. At the end of the show, "Luktelk" was announced among the top 10 entries of the first semi-final and hence qualified to compete in the final. It was later revealed that Lithuania placed fourth out of the fifteen participating countries in the semi-final with 119 points. In the final, Lithuania performed in position 7 and placed fourteenth out of the 25 performing countries, scoring a total of 90 points.

== Background ==
Prior to 2024, Lithuanian National Radio and Television (LRT) had participated in the Eurovision Song Contest representing Lithuania twenty-three times since its first entry in 1994. Its best placing was achieved in 2006, with "We Are the Winners", performed by LT United, finishing in sixth place in the final. Following the introduction of semi-finals in 2004, LRT had managed to qualify to the final twelve times. It was represented in 2023 by the song "Stay", performed by Monika Linkytė, who qualified for the final and ended 11th overall with 127 points.

As part of its duties as participating broadcaster, LRT organises the selection of its entry in the Eurovision Song Contest and broadcasts the event in the country. Between 2020 and 2023, the national final format Pabandom iš naujo! was used to select its entry. LRT confirmed its intention to participate in the 2024 contest in mid-July 2023; three months later, the broadcaster announced that it would use a new format, titled Eurovizija.LT.

== Before Eurovision ==
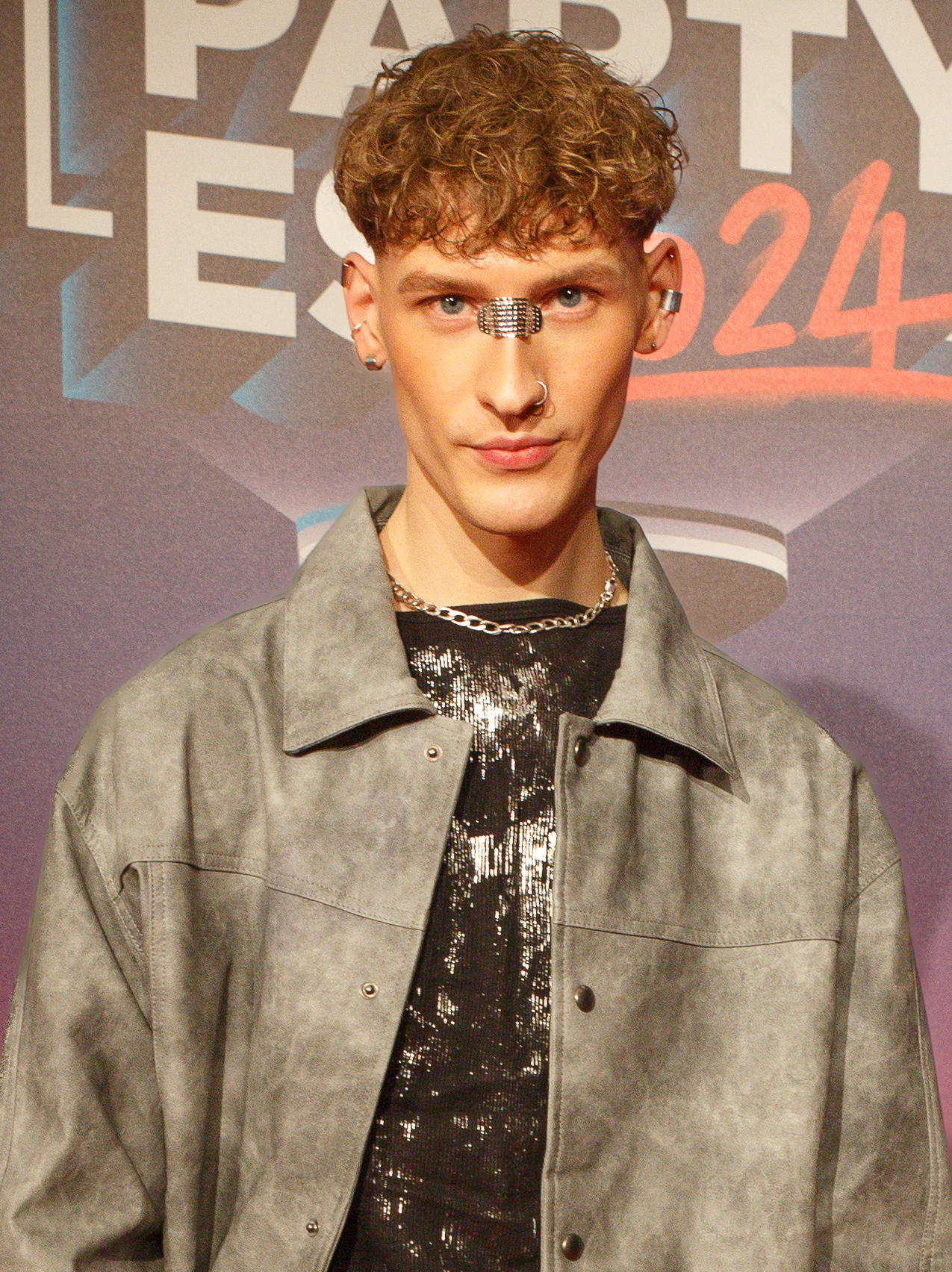
Silvester Belt, winner of Eurovizija.LT 2024, at the PrePartyES event in Madrid

=== Eurovizija.LT 2024 ===
Eurovizija.LT 2024 was the national final format organised by LRT to select its entry for the Eurovision Song Contest 2024. It was held between 13 January and 17 February 2024 and was hosted by Gabrielė Martirosian and Nombeko Augustė Khotseng, with TikToker Nerijus Trilikauskas hosting segments from the green room. The shows were broadcast on LRT televizija and LRT Lituanica as well as online via the broadcaster's website lrt.lt and official LRT YouTube channel, while the final was also broadcast on LRT radijas and official Eurovision Song Contest YouTube channel.

==== Format ====
The competition saw 40 entries compete across five semi-finals, held between 13 January and 10 February 2024, and a final on 17 February 2024. A 50/50 combination of jury and public vote determined the ranking in each phase, with the top two entries from each semi-final (out of the eight total) qualifying for the final; the top three entries from the final moved on to a final televoting round selecting the winner. In case of a tie in any of the previous stages, the jury ranking would take precedence. The score system is the same used at the Eurovision Song Contest: the top ten entries from each of the jury vote and the televote are assigned 1–8, 10 and 12 points.

Performances for the semi-finals were pre-recorded, while they were delivered live in the final.

==== Competing entries ====
On 18 October 2023, LRT opened a submission platform for interested artists, lasting until 11 December 2023. Each applicant could only submit one entry. Performers were required to be Lithuanian citizens, while songwriters could be of any nationality. At the end of the submission period, over sixty applications had been received. The selected artists were privately informed of their selection by 18 December 2023 and were able to withdraw until 31 December 2023.

On 19 December 2023, the list of the 40 participating artists and songs was released by LRT. Among the selected competing artists were Andrius Pojavis, Vilija and The Roop, who represented Lithuania in the 2013, 2014 and 2021 contests, respectively. In January, Kotryna Juodzevičiūtė withdrew from the competition and was replaced by Marius Petrauskas.

Key: Entry withdrawn Replacement entry

Artist	Song	Songwriter(s)
Agnė Buškevičiūtė	"Puppeteer"	Agnė Buškevičiūtė-Tumalavičienė; Evelina Dahlia; Ida Maria Søberg; Jonas Holteberg Jensen; Vilius Tumalavičius
Aistay	"You"	Aistė Tomkevičiūtė-Pajaujienė
Aistè	"We Will Rule the World"	Aistė Gaižauskaitė; Kipras Varaneckas
Andrius Pojavis	"Sing Me a Hug"	Andrius Pojavis
Antoine Wend	"Say No More"	Antoine Wendling; Nicolas Lassus; Titas Astafėjevas
Anžela	"Paskubėk"	Titas Astafėjevas; Elena Jurgaitytė
April Frey	"New Years"	Ieva Andriuškevičiūtė
Baltos Varnos	"In the Night"	Milda Andrijauskaitė-Bakanauskaitė; Teresė Andrijauskaitė
Clockwork Creep	"Empty"	Paulius Mscichauskas
Danielė	"Cold Shower"	Danielė Paužaitė; Gabija Žvirdauskaitė; Gytis Valickas
Deividas Valma	"Blood on Your Hands"	Aidan O'Connor; Tim Dawn
Eley	"Rock My Body"	Audrius Petrauskas; Eglė Jakštytė; Titas Astafėjevas
Emilija V	"Trophy Wife"	Emilija Valiukevičiūtė; Herve "Feezy" Tshibola; Tiago "Tiago Got The Keys" Antunes
Freya Alley	"Serenade"	Kamilė Balčytytė; Laurence Hobbs
Hansanova	"Dragons and Rainbows"	Giedrius Balčiūnas
Il Senso	"Time"	Andrius Kairys; Kipras Mašanauskas
Kàro	"Weightless"	Karolė Virbickaitė
Kasparas	"Fool"	Jokūbas Tulaba; Kasparas Varanavičius; Urtė Povilauskaitė
Kotryna	"Let's Get Lost"	Unknown
Lina Štalytė	"Perfect"	Lina Štalytė
Luka	"Move On"	Gytis Valickas; Luka Kuraitė
Marius Petrauskas	"Kol laiko yra"	Eligijus Žilinskas; Marius Petrauskas; Rūta Lukoševičiūtė
Mary Mo	"Done"	Audrius Petrauskas; Marija Monika Dičiūnė; Titas Astafėjevas; Tomas Dičiūnas
Martin	"Jigsaw"	Monika Zenkevičiūtė
Meidė	"Zoo"	Meidė Šlamaitė; Paulius Vaicekauskas
Monika Marija	"Unlove You Starting Tomorrow"	Džiugas Juzėnas; Monika Marija Paulauskaitė; Titas Astafėjevas
Multiks	"Vėjas galvoje"	Paulius Burba
Paula Urbana	"It Is What It Is"	Alistair Gould; David Boyden; Francesca Morris; Hugo Shawn; Noah Simmonds; Paula Urbana
Petras	"Run"	Audrius Petrauskas; Titas Astafėjevas
Pluie de Comètes	"Be Careful"	Justė Kraujelytė; Saulius Sakavičius
Queens of Roses	"Walk Through Fire"	Adriana Pupavac; Aidan O'Connor; Andreas Bjorkman; Jonas Ekdahl
Shower	"Impossible"	Dominykas Kazimieras Krulikovskis; Jonas Filmanavičius; Simonas Krukonis; Vainius Indriūnas
Sid Hallow	"Here We Go Again"	Anyanya Udongwo; Sidas Gvozdiovas
Silvester Belt	"Luktelk"	Džesika Šyvokaitė; Elena Jurgaitytė; Silvestras Beltė
Sun Francisco	"Trauka (Svaigsta galva)"	Giedrė Ivanova; Maksimas Ivanovas
The Roop	"Simple Joy"	Mantas Banišauskas; Robertas Baranauskas; Vaidotas Valiukevičius; Vegard Hurum
Thomas G	"Us"	Audrius Petrauskas; Titas Astafėjevas
VB Gang	"Kaboom!!!"	Vidas Bareikis
Vilija	"Save Me"	Vilija Matačiūnaitė
Žalvarinis	"Gaudė vėjai"	Robertas Semeniukas; Sigita Jonynaitė; Viltė Ambrazaitytė
Živilė Gedvilaitė	"Save Me"	Linda Persson; Peter Frodin; Ylva Persson

==== Jury members ====
Jury members by show
Jury member	Semi-finals					Final	Occupation(s)
Jury member	1	2	3	4	5	Final	Occupation(s)
Ieva Narkutė	Yes	Yes	Yes	Yes	Yes	Yes	singer-songwriter
Vytautas Bikus	Yes	Yes	Yes	Yes	Yes	Yes	composer, songwriter of Lithuanian Eurovision entries in 2015 and 2018
Ramūnas Zilnys	Yes	Yes	No	Yes	Yes	Yes	music reviewer, radio host, Eurovision commentator
Kristupas Naraškevičius	No	Yes	Yes	No	No	Yes	TV and radio host
Darius Užkuraitis	Yes	No	No	Yes	No	No	radio host, former Eurovision commentator
Ieva Zasimauskaitė	No	Yes	No	No	No	Yes	2018 Lithuanian representative
Jievaras Jasinskis	No	No	Yes	No	Yes	No	2010 Lithuanian representative as part of InCulto
Giedrė Kilčiauskienė	No	No	No	Yes	No	Yes	singer-songwriter
Monika Liu	Yes	No	No	No	No	No	2022 Lithuanian representative
Gerūta Griniūtė	No	No	Yes	No	No	No	radio host, former Eurovision commentator
Tautvydas Gaudėšius	No	No	No	No	Yes	No	singer (known as FC Baseball)
Monika Linkytė	No	No	No	No	No	Yes	2015 and 2023 Lithuanian representative
Leonas Somovas	No	No	No	No	No	Yes	producer and composer
Jurijus Veklenko	No	No	No	No	No	Yes	2019 Lithuanian representative
Mindaugas Bendžius	No	No	No	No	No	Yes	producer and composer
Olga Filatova-Kontrimienė	No	No	No	No	No	Yes	designer and stylist

==== Semi-finals ====
The five semi-finals of the competition were filmed on 9, 16, 17, 23 and 24 January 2024 at the LRT studios in Vilnius, and were aired on 13, 20, 27 January, 3 and 10 February 2024. In each semi-final, 8 of the 40 competing acts performed, with the top two entries progressing to the final.

Each semi-final opened with a performance of dancers staged by choreographer Marijanas Staniulėnas. In addition to the performances of the competing entries, interval acts performed:

- Monika Liu performed "Sentimentai" (Lithuanian entry at the 2022 contest) and "Kodėl tu čia?" in the first semi-final;
- Ieva Zasimauskaitė performed "Kol Myliu" (Lithuanian version of "When We're Old", Lithuanian entry at the 2018 contest) and "Aš galiu skrist" in the second semi-final;
- Ieva Narkutė performed "Mano planeta" and "Vienintelė moteris tavo" in the third semi-final;
- Giedrė Kilčiauskienė with Happyendless performed "Aš normaliai" and "Žemė slydo po kojom" in the fourth semi-final;
- FC Baseball performed "Tu bloga" and "Meilės man per daug" in the fifth semi-final.

Semi-final 1 – 13 January 2024
R/O	Artist	Song	Jury	Televote		Total	Place
R/O	Artist	Song	Jury	Votes	Points	Total	Place
1	Živilė Gedvilaitė	"Save Me"	3	165	3	6	8
2	Antoine Wend	"Say No More"	5	310	5	10	6
3	Marius Petrauskas	"Kol laiko yra"	6	454	7	13	5
4	Silvester Belt	"Luktelk"	12	1,503	10	22	1
5	Aistay	"You"	4	199	4	8	7
6	VB Gang	"Kaboom!!!"	10	1,843	12	22	2
7	Luka	"Move On"	7	695	8	15	3
8	Clockwork Creep	"Empty"	8	412	6	14	4

Semi-final 2 – 20 January 2024
R/O	Artist	Song	Jury	Televote		Total	Place
R/O	Artist	Song	Jury	Votes	Points	Total	Place
1	Andrius Pojavis	"Sing Me a Hug"	3	190	3	6	8
2	Eley	"Rock My Body"	8	730	8	16	3
3	Deividas Valma	"Blood on Your Hands"	5	710	6	11	6
4	Aistè	"We Will Rule the World"	12	1,092	10	22	1
5	Žalvarinis	"Gaudė vėjai"	10	2,159	12	22	2
6	Paula Urbana	"It Is What It Is"	7	502	4	11	5
7	Thomas G	"Us"	6	723	7	13	4
8	Multiks	"Vėjas galvoje"	4	605	5	9	7

Semi-final 3 – 27 January 2024
R/O	Artist	Song	Jury	Televote		Total	Place
R/O	Artist	Song	Jury	Votes	Points	Total	Place
1	Anžela	"Paskubėk"	5	498	5	10	6
2	Sid Hallow	"Here We Go Again"	3	430	3	6	8
3	Meidė	"Zoo"	10	509	6	16	3
4	Pluie de Comètes	"Be Careful"	12	520	7	19	2
5	Sun Francisco	"Trauka (Svaigsta galva)"	4	457	4	8	7
6	Mary Mo	"Done"	6	1,011	10	16	4
7	Baltos Varnos	"In the Night"	7	637	8	15	5
8	Shower	"Impossible"	8	2,444	12	20	1

Semi-final 4 – 3 February 2024
R/O	Artist	Song	Jury	Televote		Total	Place
R/O	Artist	Song	Jury	Votes	Points	Total	Place
1	Agnė Buškevičiūtė	"Puppeteer"	5	771	7	12	5
2	Il Senso	"Time"	10	3,232	12	22	1
3	Kasparas	"Fool"	8	962	10	18	3
4	Monika Marija	"Unlove You Starting Tomorrow"	12	921	8	20	2
5	Vilija	"Save Me"	4	374	3	7	8
6	Danielė	"Cold Shower"	3	611	5	8	7
7	Martin	"Jigsaw"	7	713	6	13	4
8	Hansanova	"Dragons and Rainbows"	6	512	4	10	6

Semi-final 5 – 10 February 2024
R/O	Artist	Song	Jury	Televote		Total	Place
R/O	Artist	Song	Jury	Votes	Points	Total	Place
1	Freya Alley	"Serenade"	4	869	8	12	5
2	Kàro	"Weightless"	6	387	5	11	7
3	Petras	"Run"	7	335	4	11	6
4	Queens of Roses	"Walk Through Fire"	10	840	7	17	2
5	April Frey	"New Years"	8	391	6	14	4
6	Emilija V	"Trophy Wife"	3	130	3	6	8
7	The Roop	"Simple Joy"	12	3,691	12	24	1
8	Lina Štalytė	"Perfect"	5	1,730	10	15	3

==== Final ====
The live final of the competition took place on 17 February 2024 at the Švyturys Arena in Klaipėda. The final was opened by a performance of dancers staged by choreographer Marijanas Staniulėnas, followed by a parade of participants presenting all ten finalists. In addition to the performances of the competing entries Mango performed "Penkios Minutės", "Sugrįžk, Prašau", "Paviršius Širdies", "Pavasariniai Žiedai" and "Alyvos", Dons performed 2024 Latvian Eurovision entry "Hollow" and Monika Linkytė performed 2023 Lithuanian Eurovision entry "Stay" as the interval acts. A combination of the votes of a jury (50%) and the public (50%) selected three songs for a superfinal, where a televoting round determined the winner.

Due to a technical error during the superfinal, most votes had not been counted at the time of reveal of the results. During the broadcast, it was stated that "Luktelk" received 16,688 votes, that "Impossible" received 9,066, and that "Simple Joy" received 6,884 votes. Two days later, it was revealed that "Luktelk" had received 34,691, "Impossible" had received 20,307, and "Simple Joy" had received 15,046 votes. Upon counting all the votes, the results of the superfinal remained the same.

Final – 17 February 2024
R/O	Artist	Song	Jury		Televote		Total	Place
R/O	Artist	Song	Votes	Points	Votes	Points	Total	Place
1	Aistè	"We Will Rule the World"	54	4	1,635	4	8	6
2	Žalvarinis	"Gaudė vėjai"	49	3	2,750	5	8	7
3	Pluie de Comètes	"Be Careful"	59	5	578	1	6	9
4	Silvester Belt	"Luktelk"	97	10	25,502	12	22	2
5	VB Gang	"Kaboom!!!"	59	6	7,679	7	13	4
6	Il Senso	"Time"	33	2	4,012	6	8	8
7	Shower	"Impossible"	110	12	15,783	10	22	1
8	Monika Marija	"Unlove You Starting Tomorrow"	68	7	1,609	3	10	5
9	Queens of Roses	"Walk Through Fire"	20	1	897	2	3	10
10	The Roop	"Simple Joy"	89	8	11,802	8	16	3

Superfinal – 17 February 2024
R/O	Artist	Song	Televote	Place
1	Shower	"Impossible"	20,307	2
2	Silvester Belt	"Luktelk"	34,691	1
3	The Roop	"Simple Joy"	15,046	3

Detailed jury votes
R/O	Song	Juror											Total
R/O	Song	1	2	3	4	5	6	7	8	9	10	11	Total
1	"We Will Rule the World"	7	3	1	5	6	6	3	3	10	4	6	54
2	"Gaudė vėjai"	6	4	8	7	2	7	2	4	3	5	1	49
3	"Be Careful"	3	2	6	6	5	8	5	7	4	8	5	59
4	"Luktelk"	12	12	10	10	10	4	6	6	7	10	10	97
5	"Kaboom!!!"	5	6	2	3	4	3	10	12	8	2	4	59
6	"Time"	2	7	5	1	1	1	4	5	1	3	3	33
7	"Impossible"	8	8	12	12	8	12	12	2	12	12	12	110
8	"Unlove You Starting Tomorrow"	4	5	3	4	7	10	7	10	5	6	7	68
9	"Walk Through Fire"	1	1	4	2	3	2	1	1	2	1	2	20
10	"Simple Joy"	10	10	7	8	12	5	8	8	6	7	8	89

==== Ratings ====
Viewing figures by show
Show	Air date	Viewership	Share (%)
Semi-final 1	13 January 2024	176,400	16.6%
Semi-final 2	20 January 2024	209,800	20.4%
Semi-final 3	27 January 2024	227,100	23.2%
Semi-final 4	3 February 2024	214,700	19.6%
Semi-final 5	10 February 2024	236,400	21.8%
Final	17 February 2024	325,200	35.8%

=== Promotion ===
As part of the promotion of his participation in the contest, Silvester Belt attended the Melfest WKND event in Stockholm on 8 March 2024, the PrePartyES in Madrid on 30 March 2024, the Barcelona Eurovision Party on 6 April 2024, the London Eurovision Party on 7 April 2024, the Eurovision in Concert event in Amsterdam on 13 April 2024 and the Copenhagen Eurovision Party (Malmöhagen) on 4 May 2024. In this period, he met with Lithuanian communities in Stockholm, Amsterdam, London, Copenhagen and Malmö. In addition, he performed at the Eurovision Village in Malmö on 9 May 2024.

On 16 April 2024, LRT launched the social media campaign Mums reikia šokt! ("We need to dance!"), during which Lithuanian residents were invited to film themselves dancing to the song "Luktelk" and upload it to social networks. The selected material was used by LRT during the Eurovision week.

== At Eurovision ==
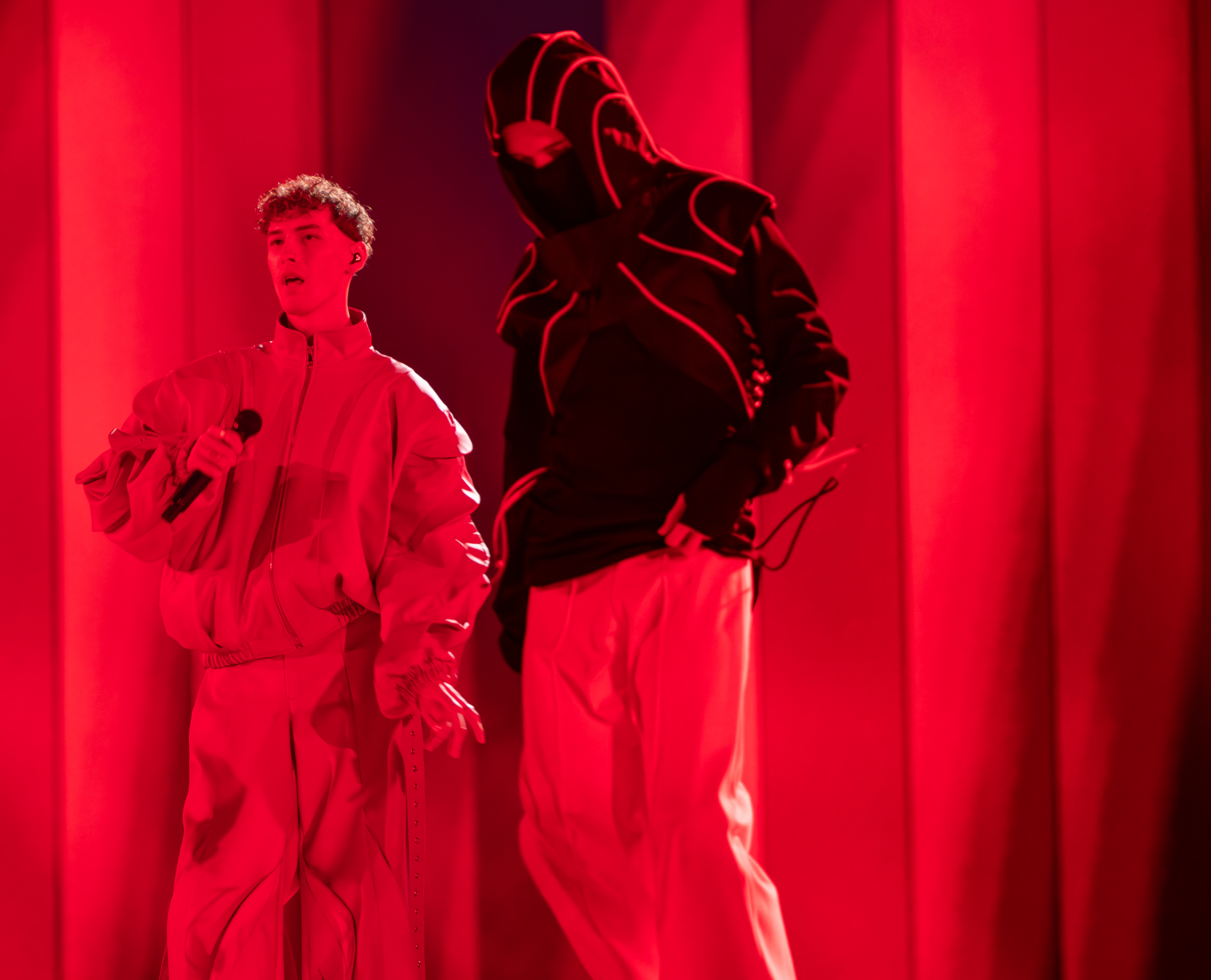
Silvester Belt during a rehearsal before the final.

The Eurovision Song Contest 2024 took place at the Malmö Arena in Malmö, Sweden, and consisted of two semi-finals held on the respective dates of 7 and 9 May and the final on 11 May 2024. All nations with the exceptions of the host country and the "Big Five" (France, Germany, Italy, Spain and the United Kingdom) were required to qualify from one of two semi-finals in order to compete in the final; the top ten countries from each semi-final progressed to the final. On 30 January 2024, an allocation draw was held to determine which of the two semi-finals, as well as which half of the show, each country would perform in; the European Broadcasting Union (EBU) split up the competing countries into different pots based on voting patterns from previous contests, with countries with favourable voting histories put into the same pot. Lithuania was scheduled for the first half of the first semi-final. The shows' producers then decided the running order for the semi-finals; Lithuania was set to perform in position 3.

In Lithuania, all the shows were broadcast on LRT televizija and on LRT radijas as well as online via the broadcaster's website lrt.lt, with commentary provided by Ramūnas Zilnys. Each semi-final was preceded by a half-hour preview show hosted by Zilnys, and before the final, there was also a special 25-minute documentary by Rolandas Masiulis about Silvester Belt's road to Eurovision. In addition, as part of the Eurovision programming, LRT aired a documentary titled ABBA – Against the Odds, produced by DR, SVT and several other EBU members on the occasion of the 50th anniversary of Sweden's first victory at the contest with "Waterloo" by ABBA. During the Eurovision week, a special radio show was broadcast, hosted by former Eurovision commentators Darius Užkuraitis and Gerūta Griniūtė. In March and April, LRT radijas also presented the podcast Suvienyti Eurovizijos ("United by Eurovision"), hosted by Justas Buivydas. Also, since March 29, during the LRT televizija morning show Labas rytas, Lietuva ("Good morning, Lithuania"), one song of this year's contest was presented every day.

=== Performance ===
Silvester Belt took part in technical rehearsals on 27 April and 1 May, followed by dress rehearsals on 6 and 7 May. The staging of his performance of "Luktelk" at the contest is directed by Povilas Varvuolis, who had been responsible for all Lithuanian performances since 2017, and Norvydas Genys, who is responsible for the content of the LED screens and lighting. He is joined by four dancers: Arnas Ginevičius, Nerijus Trilikauskas, Eivydas Katkauskas and Andrius Vrubliauskas; while Monika Švilpaitė serves as an off-stage backing vocalist. His clothing was designed by Vainotas Jakštas and created by Marija Petraitytė (costume), Kamilė Peleckytė (shoes) and Gintarė Pečkytė (accessories).

=== Semi-final ===
Lithuania performed in position 3, following the entry from Serbia and before the entry from Ireland. At the end of the show, the country was announced as a qualifier for the final. It was later revealed that Lithuania placed fourth out of the fifteen participating countries in the first semi-final with 119 points.

=== Final ===
Following the semi-final, Lithuania was drawn to perform in the first half of the final. Lithuania will perform in position 7, following the entry from Israel and before the entry from Spain. Silvester Belt once again took part in dress rehearsals on 10 and 11 May before the final, including the jury final where the professional juries cast their final votes before the live show on 11 May. He performed a repeat of his semi-final performance during the final on 11 May. Lithuania placed fourteenth in the final, scoring 90 points; 58 points from the public televoting and 32 points from the juries.

=== Voting ===
Below is a breakdown of points awarded by and to Lithuania in the first semi-final and in the final. Voting during the three shows involved each country awarding sets of points from 1-8, 10 and 12: one from their professional jury and the other from televoting in the final vote, while the semi-final vote was based entirely on the vote of the public. The Lithuanian jury consisted of Agneta Gabalytė, Jievaras Jasinskis, who represented Lithuania in the 2010 contest as member of the group InCulto, Povilas Meškėla, Kristupas Naraškevičius, and Monika Marija Paulauskaitė. In the first semi-final, Lithuania placed 4th with 119 points, receiving maximum twelve points from Ireland and the United Kingdom, and marking a fourth consecutive qualification to the final for the country. In the final, Lithuania placed 14th with 90 points. Over the course of the contest, Lithuania awarded its 12 points to Ukraine in the first semi-final, and Switzerland (jury) and Ukraine (televote) in the final.

LRT appointed Monika Linkytė, who represented Lithuania in the 2015 and 2023 contests, as its spokesperson to announce the Lithuanian jury's votes in the final.

==== Points awarded to Lithuania ====
Points awarded to Lithuania (Semi-final 1)
Score	Televote
12 points	Ireland; United Kingdom
10 points	Cyprus; Luxembourg; Ukraine
8 points	Germany
7 points	Finland; Iceland; Poland
6 points	Australia; Slovenia
5 points	Rest of the World; Sweden
4 points	Portugal
3 points	Azerbaijan; Croatia
2 points	Moldova; Serbia
1 point	

Points awarded to Lithuania (Final)
Score	Televote	Jury
12 points		
10 points		
8 points	Latvia; United Kingdom	
7 points	Ireland; Ukraine	Portugal; Serbia
6 points		
5 points		Moldova; Ukraine
4 points	Estonia; Iceland; Luxembourg	Netherlands
3 points	Norway; Poland; Sweden	
2 points	Germany	Estonia
1 point	Czechia; Denmark; Netherlands; San Marino; Spain	France; Germany

==== Points awarded by Lithuania ====
Points awarded by Lithuania (Semi-final 1)
Score	Televote
12 points	Ukraine
10 points	Croatia
8 points	Ireland
7 points	Luxembourg
6 points	Finland
5 points	Portugal
4 points	Poland
3 points	Slovenia
2 points	Australia
1 point	Azerbaijan

Points awarded by Lithuania (Final)
Score	Televote	Jury
12 points	Ukraine	Switzerland
10 points	Croatia	Croatia
8 points	Switzerland	Portugal
7 points	France	France
6 points	Estonia	Ukraine
5 points	Ireland	Sweden
4 points	Latvia	Israel
3 points	Israel	Ireland
2 points	Italy	Norway
1 point	Sweden	Germany

==== Detailed voting results ====
Each participating broadcaster assembles a five-member jury panel consisting of music industry professionals who are citizens of the country they represent. Each jury, and individual jury member, is required to meet a strict set of criteria regarding professional background, as well as diversity in gender and age. No member of a national jury was permitted to be related in any way to any of the competing acts in such a way that they cannot vote impartially and independently. The individual rankings of each jury member as well as the nation's televoting results were released shortly after the grand final.

The following members comprised the Lithuanian jury:

- Agneta Gabalytė
- Jievaras Jasinskis
- Povilas Meškėla
- Kristupas Naraškevičius
- Monika Marija Paulauskaitė

Detailed voting results from Lithuania (Semi-final 1)
R/O	Country	Televote	
R/O	Country	Rank	Points
01	Cyprus	11	
02	Serbia	14	
03	Lithuania		
04	Ireland	3	8
05	Ukraine	1	12
06	Poland	7	4
07	Croatia	2	10
08	Iceland	12	
09	Slovenia	8	3
10	Finland	5	6
11	Moldova	13	
12	Azerbaijan	10	1
13	Australia	9	2
14	Portugal	6	5
15	Luxembourg	4	7

Detailed voting results from Lithuania (Final)
R/O	Country	Jury							Televote	
R/O	Country	Juror A	Juror B	Juror C	Juror D	Juror E	Rank	Points	Rank	Points
01	Sweden	13	1	12	6	17	6	5	10	1
02	Ukraine	2	4	5	4	9	5	6	1	12
03	Germany	21	9	11	7	10	10	1	14	
04	Luxembourg	23	10	14	8	12	12		20	
~~05~~	~~Netherlands~~ ‡ (Note: The Netherlands was disqualified prior to the final.)	~~9~~	~~11~~	~~22~~	~~18~~	~~23~~	~~16~~		N/A	
06	Israel	14	16	1	14	6	7	4	8	3
07	Lithuania									
08	Spain	4	20	24	20	25	13		13	
09	Estonia	16	17	19	19	24	24		5	6
10	Ireland	7	6	13	10	4	8	3	6	5
11	Latvia	25	21	7	21	11	15		7	4
12	Greece	20	18	20	12	21	22		18	
13	United Kingdom	10	13	21	25	18	19		16	
14	Norway	15	15	3	17	5	9	2	17	
15	Italy	11	22	23	9	20	17		9	2
16	Serbia	18	23	9	16	14	18		24	
17	Finland	12	14	25	24	22	21		11	
18	Portugal	6	3	4	5	3	3	8	23	
19	Armenia	8	7	16	11	16	11		12	
20	Cyprus	22	12	17	15	15	20		15	
21	Switzerland	1	2	6	1	1	1	12	3	8
22	Slovenia	19	19	10	13	8	14		22	
23	Croatia	3	5	2	3	7	2	10	2	10
24	Georgia	17	25	18	22	13	23		21	
25	France	5	8	8	2	2	4	7	4	7
26	Austria	24	24	15	23	19	25		19	
