= Megan Redmond =

American singer-songwriter

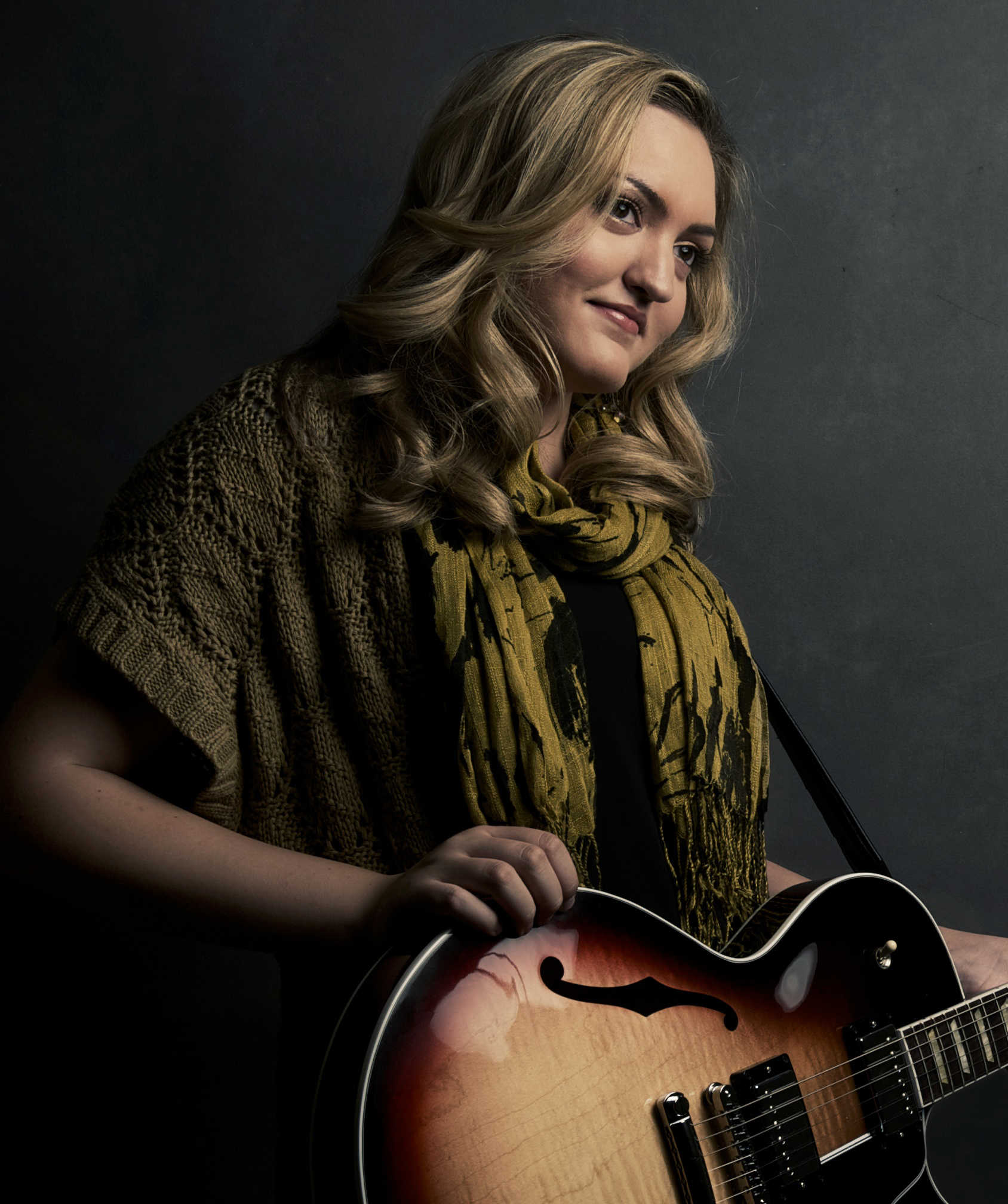

Background information
- Born: March 1996 (age 30); Portland, Oregon, United States
- Origin: Denver, Colorado, United States
- Genres: Country, alternative, Americana
- Instruments: Vocals, guitar, piano, mandolin, banjo
- Years active: 2011–present
- Website: www.meganredmond.com

Megan Redmond (born March 1996 in Portland, Oregon) is an American singer-songwriter living in Nashville, Tennessee and Denver, Colorado, where she started her band in 2011.

== Background ==
Redmond’s first single, titled "Telephone," was released in 2011, followed by her first EP, Dreamland, in 2012. The single "Falling," off of Dreamland, was listed by Clear Channel’s Hot New Music program, peaking at number 87 on the BillBoard Hot New Country Top 100 charts. In 2009 Redmond received the Colorado Country Music Association’s Female Vocalist and Female Entertainer of the year award. She has performed at major music festivals, including the Bohemian Nights in Fort Collins, Colorado. Redmond has worked with the Grammy award-winning artist Linda Davis and is currently receiving training from Nashville vocal coach Kim Woods Sandusky. Redmond was one of the top 25 finalists in the American Songwriter Coffeehouse Tour presented by Fishman Transducers. In 2010, she was a local winner of the Texaco Country Music Showdown.

Megan also has a number of cuts on other artist albums reflected her song writing and melodic talent.

In addition to Redmond’s role as a vocalist, she is also a multi-instrumentalist playing the guitar, piano, mandolin, and banjo.

== Discography ==
- "Telephone" (Single, 2011)
- Dreamland (EP, 2012)
- "Falling'"(Single, 2012)
- "Acoustic Sessions" (EP, 2012)
- "Three" (EP, 2014)
