= Bambie Thug =

Irish singer (born 1993)

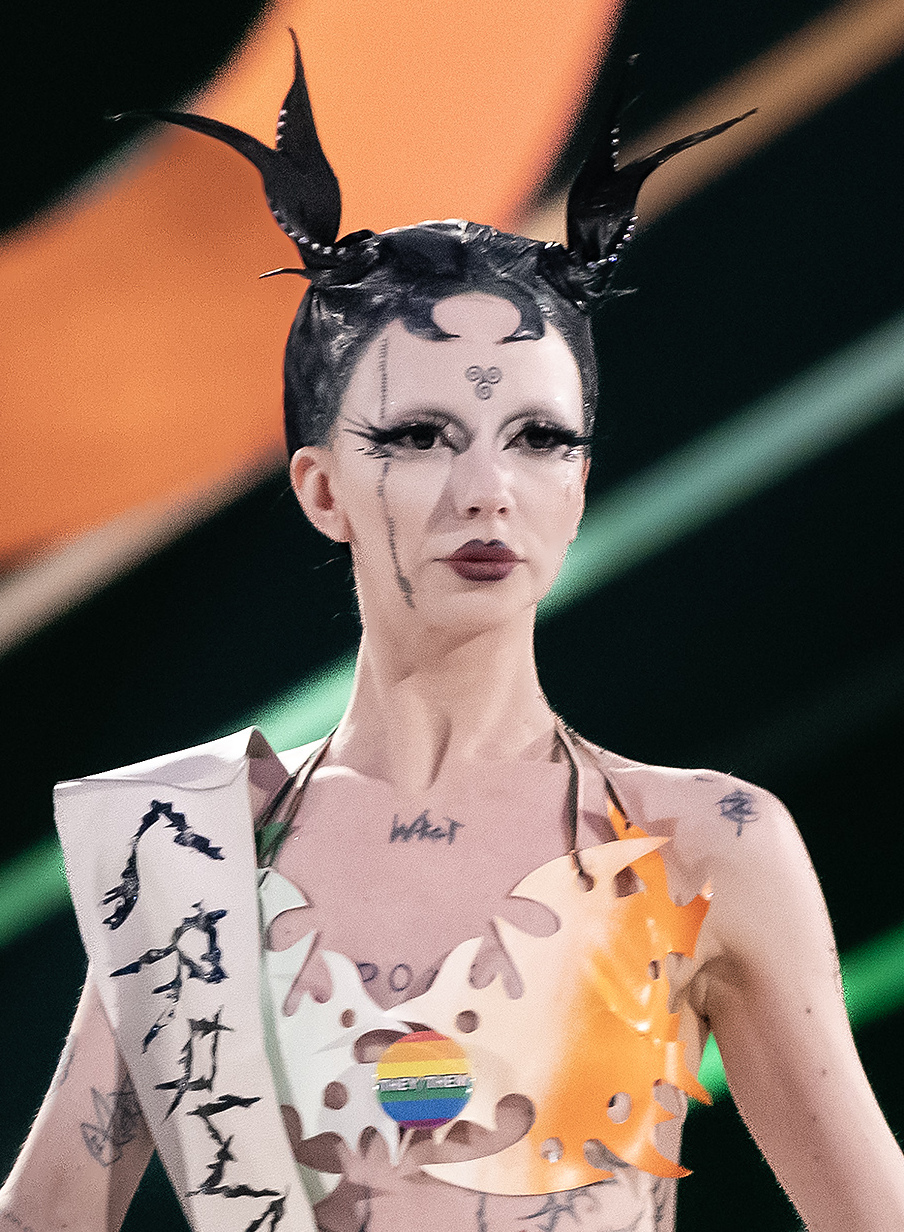
- Bambie Thug in 2024

Background information
- Also known as: Bambie Ray Robinson
- Born: 6 March 1993 (age 33); Macroom, County Cork, Ireland
- Occupations: Singer, songwriter
- Years active: 2020–present
- Website: hausofthug.com

Bambie Ray Robinson (born 6 March 1993), known by their (Note: Bambie Thug uses they/them and fae/faer pronouns; this article uses they/them for consistency.) stage name Bambie Thug, is an Irish singer-songwriter. They are known to mix numerous genres in their music, coining their own term, "ouija-pop", out of disdain for being put into one genre. Robinson's music has been inspired by various subjects, including breakups, witchcraft, and drug addiction.

Robinson is the first openly non-binary artist to represent Ireland in the Eurovision Song Contest, doing so in 2024 with the song "Doomsday Blue". They finished in sixth place, becoming Ireland's highest scoring entrant and scoring the country its best placement in the contest since 2000.

== Early life ==
Robinson was born and raised in Macroom, County Cork, on 6 March 1993, to a Swedish father from Stockholm and a mother from Cork, and has three sisters. Attending St Mary's Secondary School in Macroom, they were a member of the school's choir club, helping win the school the All-Ireland Schools Choir competition. Initially training to become a ballet performer, they later attended Coláiste Stiofáin Naofa, planning for university to study dance. They then moved to London to attend the Urdang Academy after Urdang gave Robinson a partial scholarship. However, Robinson broke their arm during their time in college, switching to study musical theatre.

After graduating from Urdang, Robinson spent two years teaching themself how to write and sing pop songs. Robinson initially signed with an unnamed talent agency; however, they left because Robinson claims the agency wanted them to head into bubblegum pop.

== Musical career ==
=== Beginnings, first singles (2020–2022) ===
Robinson was first credited in music in 2020 as a featured artist on the Fike and Fabich song "Mean", which was released on 26 June 2020. Robinson released their debut single, "Birthday", on 5 March 2021. The song, which was written while Robinson was addicted to drugs and its uncensored music video being released on pornography sites, was described by The Line of Best Fit writer Robert Davidson as a "stoic-but-smashed stream of consciousness... with their coaxing voice documenting the events around them like a debaucherous diary. They float through brawls, consume copious drugs, and wait impatiently for their tardy dealer". Robinson released three more singles later that year, including "Psilocyber", a song about a "psychedelic" computer virus, "P.M.P.", a song that promotes sexual positivity and Robinson's love of "pussy power", and "High Romancy". By 2022, Rockflesh writer Stewart Lucas described Robinson's music as "gritty and direct and seem to either be about sex and drugs or drugs and sex".

Robinson started dating a partner by the Christmas season of 2021. However, the relationship that Robinson described as "really toxic", ended in 2022, leading to a broken sense of "trust and sense of self" for Robinson. Robinson later released "Merry Christmas Baby" on 9 December 2022, stating in Kerrang!, "It's funny how people change like seasons, last Christmas I swore I had found the one. Love really has a way of colouring red flags white."

=== "Egregore" and Cathexis (2023) ===
In April 2023, Robinson released their first single of that year, "Egregore". The song, named after an occult term, is stated to be about Robinson's desire to break self-destructive habits as an independent artist.

Robinson announced their third EP, Cathexis, on 11 August 2023, with the EP officially releasing on 13 October. Along with the announcement, they released two singles, "Careless" and "Last Summer (I Know What You Did)". In an interview with DIY Magazine, they stated that the EP, influenced by their love of musical theatre, focuses on them "being creatures and characters... [however,] sometimes characters are a bit of an armour. When I'm not in an amazing mental space, they're things I can pull on, but they're all still facets of me."

=== Eurovision Song Contest (2024) ===
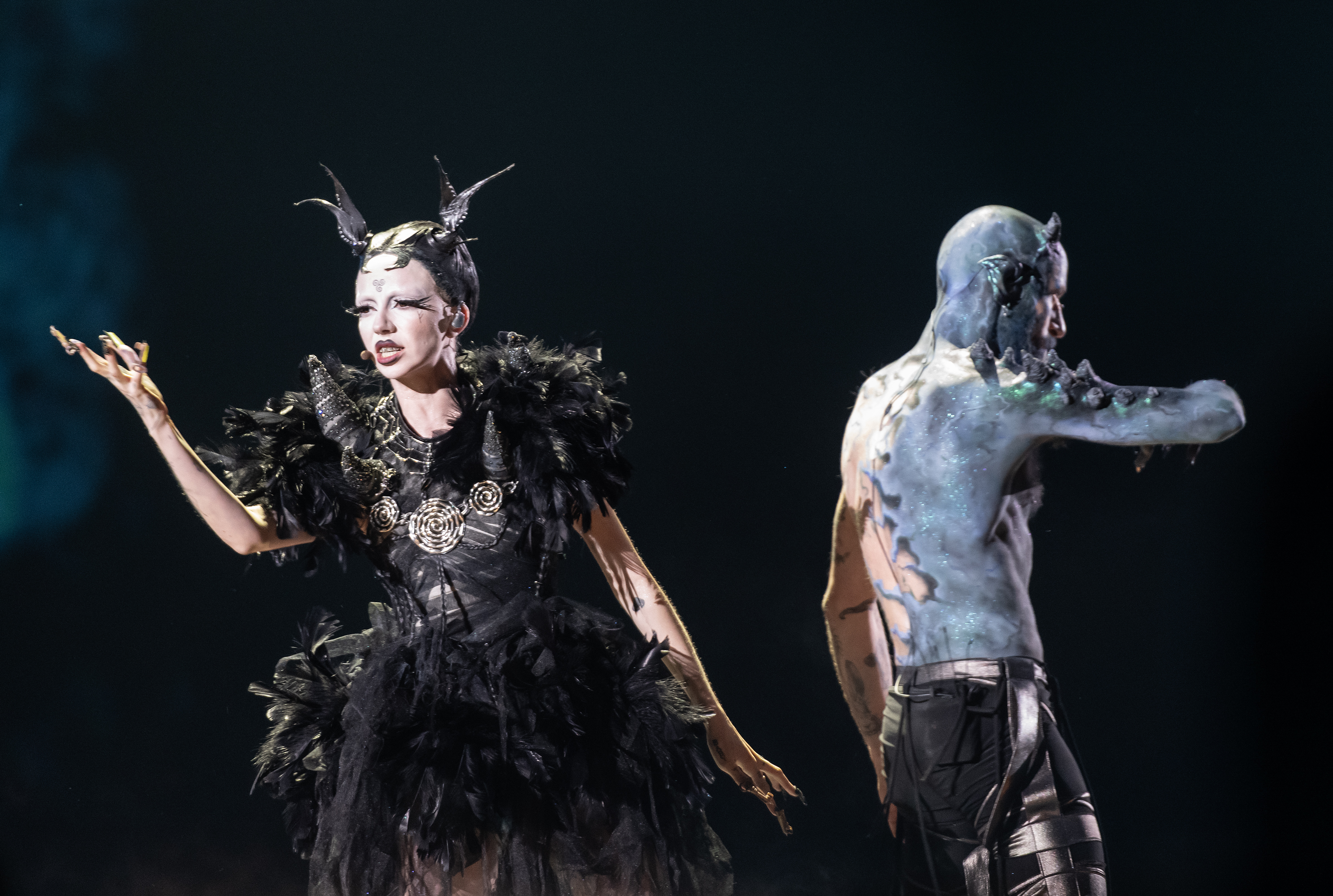
Robinson during Eurovision 2024 final dress rehearsal

On 11 January 2024, Robinson was announced as a competitor in Eurosong 2024, Ireland's national final for the Eurovision Song Contest 2024, with their song "Doomsday Blue". According to an interview by the Irish Sun, they entered to "curse out" memories of them being raped in May 2023, around three weeks before a gig at their debut performance at a festival. At the national final, Robinson won both the national jury voting and the televote, earning the right to represent Ireland. Denise O'Donoghue of the Irish Examiner noted the performer's popularity on social media and in the Late Late Show studio, where the audience called for voters to "send the witch".

At Eurovision, Robinson participated in the first semi-final on 7 May 2024, successfully qualifying for the final along with nine other artists. In the final, which took place on 11 May, they finished sixth (behind Switzerland, Croatia, Ukraine, France, and Israel), becoming Ireland's highest scoring entry and scored the country its best result in the contest since 2000.

==== Critical reception after Eurosong victory ====
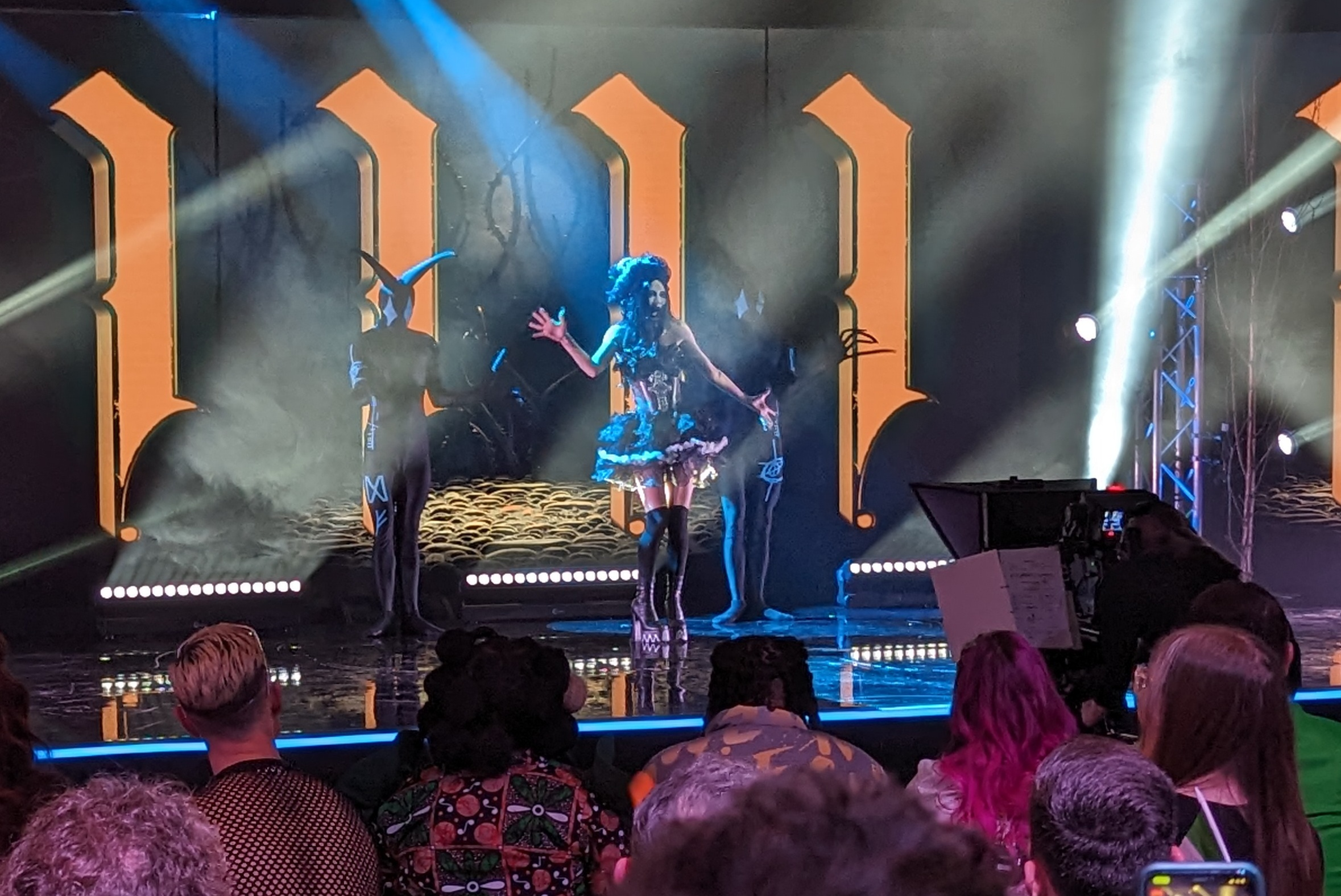
Robinson performing "Doomsday Blue" on The Late Late Show in 2024 after they won Eurosong 2024.

After their victory in Eurosong 2024, Robinson drew media attention, especially from local Irish media. The song, along with Robinson personally, has been criticized by Irish far-right personalities, including Hermann Kelly, the president of the Irish Freedom Party. By 6 February, over 2,000 people signed a petition to disqualify Robinson from their victory, with the petition being based on "Bambie Thug making a mockery of [Irish] national culture". In response to criticism, Robinson released a press statement on 29 January, and in an appearance on The Late Late Show in February 2024, Bambie Thug said they wished "love and light" to those who had reacted negatively to the song, mentioning that one person had started a petition to remove them from the competition.

The song itself also gained praise for its uniqueness compared to past Irish songs sent to the Eurovision Song Contest. The Irish Times writer Ed Power gave a positive review, stating, "Their sugar-and-spice mix of pop and industrial metal will undoubtedly land with a splash in Malmö." Irish singer Johnny Logan, who won the Eurovision Song Contest for Ireland in 1980 and 1987, stated in the Sunday World his belief that the song "could win the Eurovision", praising the song's uniqueness and the staging visuals. Despite responding to heavy criticism, Robinson also stated that they felt that Ireland "[got] behind me so much".

== Musical style ==
Robinson has used the term "ouija-pop" to describe their music. In a 2023 interview, they stated "my stuff is hyperpunk avant electro-pop. We call it grit pop or rot but recently I've been coining the term 'ouija pop'". They stated that they coined the term due to a reluctance of being "put in a box", instead combining numerous genres, with Robinson "never having anything in mind" whenever making music. One of Robinson's major influences musically is a reluctance to be stuck to a style or genre; in an interview with NME, Robinson claimed that they could do "everything" creatively, stating their belief that the heavy metal music community had expanded to include more genres and be more accepting of the LGBTQ+ community. However, they also stated that the heavy metal community was "under attack", with Robinson considering themselves a "rebel". They have been linked with the "nu gen" movement alongside acts like Poppy, Dana Dentata and Cassyette (Bambie collaborated with the latter on the track Doomsday Blue).

Robinson has stated an emphasis on trying to be "good role models" with music, stating a belief that many within the industry "glamourise" drug addiction. They stated in an interview with Gay Times that "We need to parade healthy behaviour. It's important if we are going to be breaking [through] so that younger kids and teens listening to our music, and looking up to us, aren't fed this negative behaviour."

In interviews, Robinson has stated that their favourite artists were Dolly Parton, Britney Spears, Nina Simone, Paul Simon, Joni Mitchell, and Led Zeppelin.

== Personal life ==
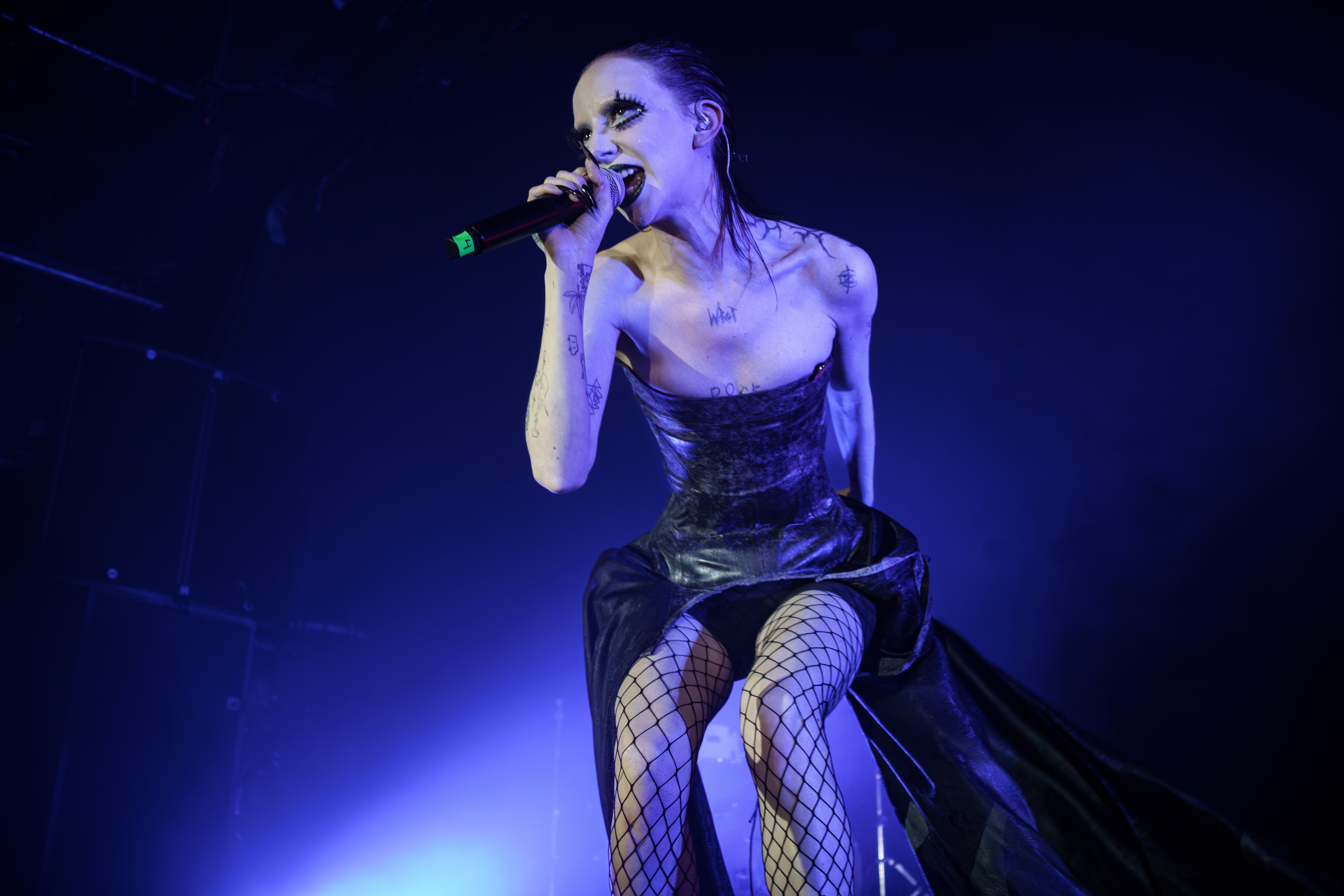
Bambie Thug performing in Madrid during PrePartyES 2024

As a child, Robinson was diagnosed with ADHD. They currently reside in East London. In their spare time, Robinson has occasionally worked as a party princess at events for disabled children. Robinson has described themself as "not a very angry person", instead bottling up anger for their musical performances.

Robinson is non-binary. They have stated on numerous occasions their experiences on being a member of the LGBTQ+ community and being LGBTQ+ in the music industry. In an interview with Gay Times, Robinson stated, "I like being part of a cool queer rising scene. I also didn't have that growing up so it's important to have people you can relate to and have music that speaks to you and allows you more freedom to be yourself – more queer voices is what the world fucking needs."

Robinson was baptized Protestant. Robinson practices neopagan witchcraft, particularly sigil and manifestation magic. They have also stated to have done blood magic during their period, stating that it is "an offering of your own blood onto a spout and it's also really good for your skin". Witchcraft has had a major influence on Robinson's music; numerous spells and hexes are included in various songs, with Robinson making their own sigil as their own official logo.

Robinson has expressed support for the exclusion of Israel from the Eurovision Song Contest 2024 as a result of the Gaza war. Basing their argument over the exclusion of Russia from the Eurovision Song Contest 2022, Robinson stated in the Irish Examiner, "When things were going on with Ukraine, Russia wasn't allowed to enter, so I don't think there should be a rule for one and a different for another." However, they have also stated that the decision to exclude Israel should be left to the European Broadcasting Union.

== Discography ==
=== Extended plays ===
List of EPs, with selected details
Title	Details	Peak chart positions
Title	Details	LTU
Psilocyber	Released: 14 May 2021; Label: Unity Records; Formats: Digital download, streaming	—
High Romancy	Released: 27 October 2021; Label: Smol Records; Formats: Digital download, streaming	—
Cathexis	Released: 13 October 2023; Label: Haus of Thug; Formats: Digital download, streaming	43
"—" denotes an extended play that did not chart or was not released in that territory.

=== Singles ===
==== As lead artist ====
Title	Year	Peak chart positions						Album or EP
Title	Year	IRE	FIN	LTU	NLD	SWE	UK	Album or EP
"Birthday"	2021	—	—	—	—	—	—	Psilocyber
"P.M.P"	2021	—	—	—	—	—	—	High Romancy
"Kawasaki (I Love It)"	2022	—	—	—	—	—	—	Non-album singles
"Headbang"	2022	—	—	—	—	—	—	Non-album singles
"Tsunami (11:11)"	2022	—	—	—	—	—	—	Non-album singles
"Merry Christmas Baby"	2022	—	—	—	—	—	—	Non-album singles
"Egregore"	2023	—	—	—	—	—	—	Non-album singles
"Careless"	2023	—	—	—	—	—	—	Cathexis
"Last Summer (I Know What You Did)" (with Jinka)	2023	—	—	—	—	—	—	Cathexis
"Doomsday Blue"	2023	23	40	9	86	64	67	Cathexis
"Hex So Heavy"	2024	—	—	—	—	—	—	Non-album singles
"Fangtasy"	2024	—	—	—	—	—	—	Non-album singles
"Redrum"	2025	—	—	—	—	—	—	Non-album singles
"—" denotes a recording that did not chart or was not released in that territory.

==== As featured artist ====
Title	Year	Album or EP
"Bad Witch" (Alina Pash featuring Bambie Thug)	2024	Alina Pash (Coven Deluxe)

== Awards and nominations ==
Year	Award	Category	Nominee(s)	Result	Ref.
2024	Rock Sound Awards	Breakthrough Artist	Themself	Won	
2024	Eurovision Awards	Best Artistic Vision	Themself	Runner-up	
2024	Eurovision Awards	Style Icon	Themself	Won	
2024	Berlin Music Video Awards	Best Low Budget	Tsunami	Nominated	

== Notes ==
Awards and achievements
Preceded by Wild Youth with "We Are One"	Ireland in the Eurovision Song Contest; 2024	Succeeded by Emmy with "Laika Party"
