= Denmark in the Eurovision Song Contest 2024 =

- Eurovision Song Contest 2024
- Participating broadcaster: Danish Broadcasting Corporation (DR)
- Country: Denmark
- Selection process: Dansk Melodi Grand Prix 2024
- Selection date: 17 February 2024

Competing entry
- Song: "Sand"
- Artist: Saba
- Songwriters: Jonas Thander; Melanie Wehbe; Pil Kalinka Nygaard Jeppesen

Placement
- Semi-final result: Failed to qualify (12th)

Participation chronology

Denmark was represented at the Eurovision Song Contest 2024 with the song "Sand", written by Jonas Thander, Melanie Wehbe, and Pil Kalinka Nygaard Jeppesen, and performed by Saba. The Danish participating broadcaster, the Danish Broadcasting Corporation (DR), organised the national final Dansk Melodi Grand Prix 2024 in order to select its entry for the contest.

== Background ==
Prior to the 2024 contest, the Danish Broadcasting Corporation (DR) had participated in the Eurovision Song Contest representing Denmark fifty-one times since its first entry in 1957. It had won the contest, to this point, on three occasions: in 1963 with the song "Dansevise" performed by Grethe and Jørgen Ingmann, in 2000 with the song "Fly on the Wings of Love" performed by Olsen Brothers, and in 2013 with the song "Only Teardrops" performed by Emmelie de Forest. In 2021, 2022, and 2023, "Øve os på hinanden" performed by Fyr og Flamme, "The Show" performed by Reddi and "Breaking My Heart" performed by Reiley all failed to qualify to the final.

As part of its duties as participating broadcaster, DR organises the selection of its entry in the Eurovision Song Contest and broadcasts the event in the country. The broadcaster had selected all of its Eurovision entries thus far through the national final Dansk Melodi Grand Prix. DR confirmed its intention to participate at the 2024 contest on 12 May 2023, announcing that Dansk Melodi Grand Prix would again be organised in order to select its entry for the contest.

== Before Eurovision ==
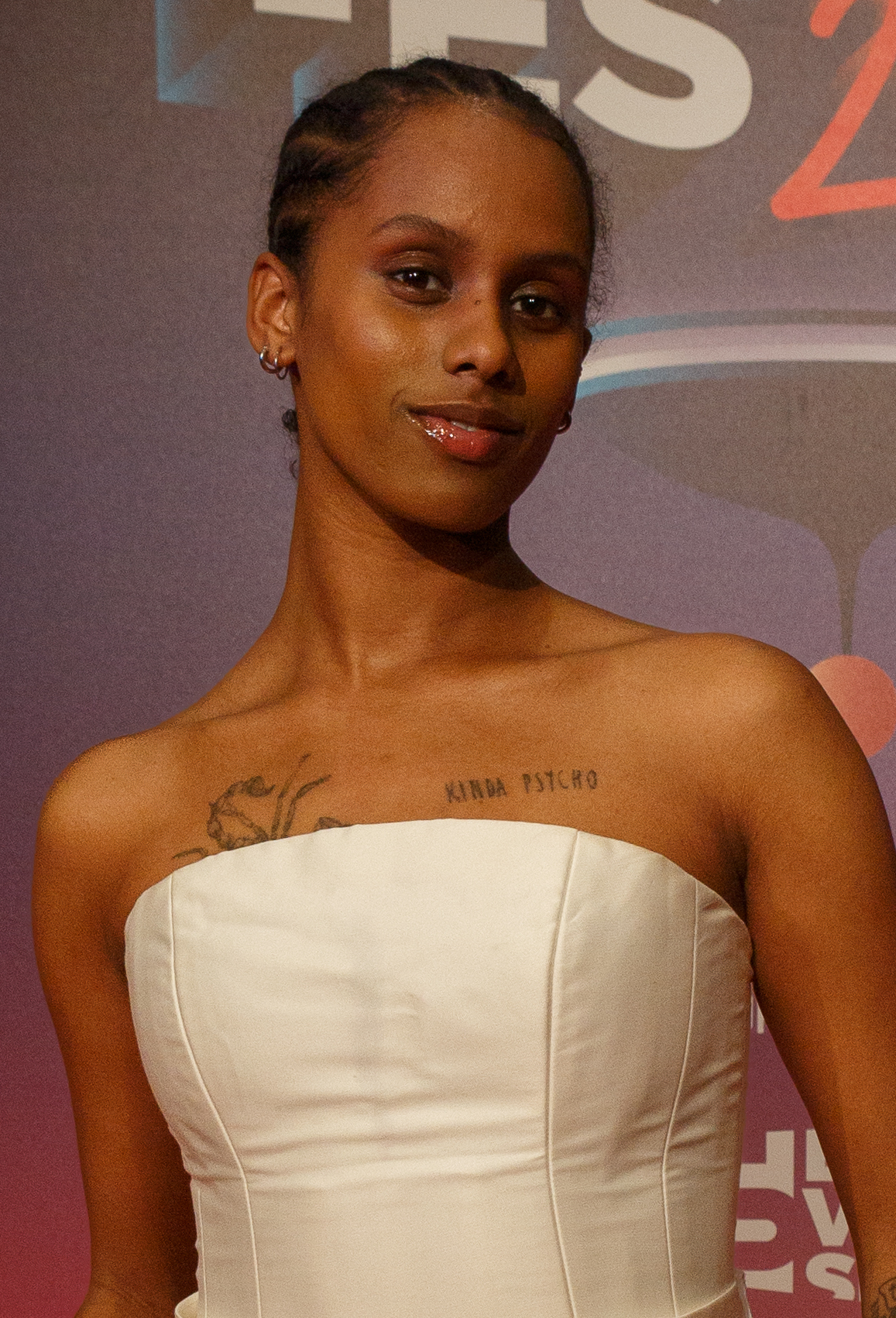
Saba, winner of Dansk Melodi Grand Prix 2024, at the PrePartyES event in Madrid

=== Dansk Melodi Grand Prix 2024 ===
Dansk Melodi Grand Prix 2024 was the 54th edition of Dansk Melodi Grand Prix (DMGP), the music competition that selects the Danish entries for the Eurovision Song Contest. The event was held on 17 February 2024 at the DR Koncerthuset in Copenhagen, and was hosted by Sara Bro and Stéphanie Surrugue. The show was broadcast on DR1 and on DR's online platform DR TV.

==== Format ====
Eight acts competed in one show where the winner was determined over two rounds of voting. In the first round, open between 10 and 16 February 2024 and again during the live final of 17 February, the top three songs qualified to a superfinal, where a second voting round determined the winner. The results of both rounds were based on the 50/50 combination of votes from the public and a 20-member jury panel (a larger one than in previous editions), composed for the first time since 2012 of ten international members – from the five most recent winning countries, i.e. Sweden, Ukraine, Italy, the Netherlands and Israel – alongside ten Danish professionals. Viewers were able to vote each song once per round via a new version of the mobile application introduced in the 2023 edition or, during the live show, via SMS. Artists were given the option of a live orchestra accompaniment for their live performances.

==== Competing entries ====
On 29 August 2023, DR opened a submission period until 27 October 2023 for artists and composers to submit their entries. Songs could be submitted and performed in any language, however, in order to qualify to compete, at least one composer, lyricist or performer had to be a Danish citizen or exhibit connection to Denmark (such as permanent residence in the country or marriage to a Danish citizen). By the end of the submission window, around 600 entries had been received. DR also selected contestants by direct invitation of artists from the Danish music scene. The selection process was completed on 27 October 2023, with the selected entries announced and released on 25 January 2024; they were presented in a dedicated programme hosted by Fyr og Flamme on 10 February, one week before the final. Among the entrants was Basim, who represented Denmark in the Eurovision Song Contest 2014. For the first time in the history of the event, none of the competing entries contained lyrics in the Danish language, all of them being in English.

Artist	Song	Songwriter(s)
Aura Dione	"Mirrorball of Hope"	Kenneth Alexander Nicolaisen; Maria Louise Joensen; Andres Artiles Jerrik; Michelle Leonard
Basim	"Johnny"	Anis Basim Moujahid; Frederik Nordsø; Frej Randrup Lund; Erika Charlotte Martinez Vest
Chu Chu	"The Chase (Zoom Zoom)"	Amy Jeyasri Larsen; Christopher Engel Snitkjær; Emma Lincoln; Merle Pi Madsen; Nina Vejen Henriksen
Janus Wiberg	"I Need Your Love"	Danny Baludrsson; Janus Wiberg; Marius Ziska; Nick Tsang; Simun Dam; Søren Balsner
RoseeLu	"Real Love"	Anders Bønløkke; Anders Stig Gehrt Nielsen; Jakob Groth Bastiansen; Joachim Ersgaard; Rosa Frydensbjerg; Stine Bramsen
Saba	"Sand"	Jonas Thander; Melanie Wehbe; Pil Kalinka Nygaard Jeppesen
Stella	"Sign Here"	Sophie Darum; Søren Christensen; Tim Schou
Ublu	"Planetary Hearts"	Adam Spanggaard Saarup; Andreas Darger; Emil Emborg; Frej Fogh Darger; Marie Rørbæk; Martina Nielsen

==== Final ====
The final took place on 17 February 2024.

Final – 17 February 2024
R/O	Artist	Song	Result
1	Saba	"Sand"	Qualified
2	Stella	"Sign Here"	Eliminated
3	Chu Chu	"The Chase (Zoom Zoom)"	Eliminated
4	Basim	"Johnny"	Qualified
5	RoseeLu	"Real Love"	Eliminated
6	Ublu	"Planetary Hearts"	Eliminated
7	Janus Wiberg	"I Need Your Love"	Qualified
8	Aura Dione	"Mirrorball of Hope"	Eliminated

Superfinal – 17 February 2024
R/O	Artist	Song	Jury	Televote	Total	Place
1	Saba	"Sand"	22	15	37	1
2	Basim	"Johnny"	15	19	34	2
3	Janus Wiberg	"I Need Your Love"	13	16	29	3

==== Ratings ====
Viewing figures
Average viewership	Share (%)	Average rating (%)	Total viewership	Total rating (%)
967,200 (Note: Including 398,400 via streaming services)	67.3%	16.9%	1,574,262	27.5%

=== Promotion ===
As part of the promotion of her participation in the contest, Saba attended the Melfest WKND event in Stockholm on 8 March 2024, the PrePartyES in Madrid on 30 March 2024, the Barcelona Eurovision Party on 6 April 2024, the London Eurovision Party on 7 April 2024, and the Eurovision in Concert event in Amsterdam on 13 April 2024. She was also set to perform at the Nordic Music Celebration's Eurovision Night in Oslo on 20 April 2024 but was forced to be absent due to undisclosed personal reasons.

=== Calls for boycott ===
The inclusion of Israel in the list of participants of the 2024 contest, despite the humanitarian crisis resulting from Israeli military operations in the Gaza Strip during the Gaza war, sparked controversy in Denmark as well as several other participating countries, with calls and petitions for broadcasters to boycott the event. By mid-January 2024, Gustav Lützhøft, head of culture, children and youth at DR, stated that the broadcaster would support Israel's participation, leading to demonstrations outside the DR Koncerthuset during the announcement of DMGP contestants on 25 January, calling for the broadcaster or the eventual winning artist to boycott the contest. None of the entrants expressed their overt support for a boycott; Ublu later stated their opposition to Israel's participation ahead of the show.

While not mentioning Israel's participation in the contest, on 29 March 2024, Saba released a joint statement with other Eurovision 2024 entrants – namely Bambie Thug (Ireland), Gåte (Norway), Iolanda (Portugal), Megara (San Marino), Mustii (Belgium), Nemo (Switzerland), Olly Alexander (United Kingdom), Silvester Belt (Lithuania) and Windows95man (Finland) – calling for "an immediate and lasting ceasefire" in Gaza as well as the return of the Israeli hostages held by Hamas.

== At Eurovision ==
The Eurovision Song Contest 2024 took place at the Malmö Arena in Malmö, Sweden, and consisted of two semi-finals held on the respective dates of 7 and 9 May and the final on 11 May 2024. All nations with the exceptions of the host country and the "Big Five" (France, Germany, Italy, Spain and the United Kingdom) were required to qualify from one of two semi-finals in order to compete in the final; the top ten countries from each semi-final progress to the final. On 30 January 2024, an allocation draw was held to determine which of the two semi-finals, as well as which half of the show, each country would perform in; the European Broadcasting Union (EBU) split up the competing countries into different pots based on voting patterns from previous contests, with countries with favourable voting histories put into the same pot. Denmark was scheduled for the first half of the second semi-final. The shows' producers then decided the running order for the semi-finals; Denmark was set to perform in position 7.

In Denmark, all the shows were broadcast on DR1 as well as online via DR TV, with commentary provided by Ole Tøpholm. In addition, as part of the Eurovision programming, DR and SVT collaborated with other EBU member broadcasters – namely ARD/WDR, the BBC, ČT, ERR, France Télévisions, NRK, NTR, RÚV, VRT and Yle – to produce and air a documentary titled ABBA – Against the Odds, on the occasion of the 50th anniversary of Sweden's first victory at the contest with "Waterloo" by ABBA.

=== Performance ===
Saba took part in technical rehearsals on 29 April and 2 May, followed by dress rehearsals on 8 and 9 May. Her performance of "Sand" at the contest involved LED lighting and actual sand scattering on the stage.

=== Semi-final ===
Denmark performed in position 7, following the entry from Austria and before the entry from Armenia. The country was not announced among the top 10 entries in the semi-final and therefore failed to qualify to compete in the final. This marked the fourth consecutive time that Denmark failed to advance from the semi-finals. It was later revealed that Denmark finished 12th out of 16 countries, scoring 36 points.

=== Voting ===
Below is a breakdown of points awarded to and by Denmark in the second semi-final and in the final. Voting during the three shows involved each country awarding sets of points from 1-8, 10 and 12: one from their professional jury and the other from televoting in the final vote, while the semi-final vote was based entirely on the vote of the public. The Danish jury consisted of Jesper Groth, who represented Denmark at the 2021 contest as a member of the group Fyr og Flamme, Ihan Haydar, who represented Denmark at the 2022 contest as a member of the band Reddi, Vicky Leander, Las Thomsen, and Søren Torpegaard Lund. In the second semi-final, Denmark placed 12th with 36 points. Over the course of the contest, Denmark awarded its 12 points to Israel in the second semi-final, and to Switzerland (jury) and Croatia (televote) in the final.

DR appointed Stéphanie Surrugue as its spokesperson to announce the Danish jury's votes in the final.

==== Points awarded to Denmark ====
Points awarded to Denmark (Semi-final 2)
Score	Televote
12 points	
10 points	Norway
8 points	
7 points	San Marino (Note: San Marino uses a jury in the semi-finals.)
6 points	
5 points	Estonia
4 points	Latvia
3 points	Armenia; Austria
2 points	Switzerland
1 point	Israel; Malta

==== Points awarded by Denmark ====
Points awarded by Denmark (Semi-final 2)
Score	Televote
12 points	Israel
10 points	Netherlands
8 points	Norway
7 points	Latvia
6 points	Switzerland
5 points	Armenia
4 points	Estonia
3 points	Austria
2 points	Greece
1 point	Czechia

Points awarded by Denmark (Final)
Score	Televote	Jury
12 points	Croatia	Switzerland
10 points	Ukraine	France
8 points	Israel	Croatia
7 points	France	Ireland
6 points	Sweden	Ukraine
5 points	Switzerland	Sweden
4 points	Latvia	Latvia
3 points	Ireland	Armenia
2 points	Finland	Serbia
1 point	Lithuania	Luxembourg

==== Detailed voting results ====
Each participating broadcaster assembles a five-member jury panel consisting of music industry professionals who are citizens of the country they represent. Each jury, and individual jury member, is required to meet a strict set of criteria regarding professional background, as well as diversity in gender and age. No member of a national jury was permitted to be related in any way to any of the competing acts in such a way that they cannot vote impartially and independently. The individual rankings of each jury member as well as the nation's televoting results were released shortly after the grand final.

The following members comprised the Danish jury:

- Jesper Groth
- Ihan Haydar
- Vicky Leander
- Las Thomsen
- Søren Torpegaard Lund

Detailed voting results from Denmark (Semi-final 2)
R/O	Country	Televote	
R/O	Country	Rank	Points
01	Malta	14	
02	Albania	13	
03	Greece	9	2
04	Switzerland	5	6
05	Czechia	10	1
06	Austria	8	3
07	Denmark		
08	Armenia	6	5
09	Latvia	4	7
10	San Marino	15	
11	Georgia	11	
12	Belgium	12	
13	Estonia	7	4
14	Israel	1	12
15	Norway	3	8
16	Netherlands	2	10

Detailed voting results from Denmark (Final)
R/O	Country	Jury							Televote	
R/O	Country	Juror A	Juror B	Juror C	Juror D	Juror E	Rank	Points	Rank	Points
01	Sweden	3	20	11	10	6	7	5	5	6
02	Ukraine	11	4	3	11	11	6	6	2	10
03	Germany	20	23	6	17	16	19		14	
04	Luxembourg	9	8	25	9	7	11	1	20	
~~05~~	~~Netherlands~~ ‡ (Note: The Netherlands was disqualified prior to the final.)	~~22~~	~~25~~	~~4~~	~~2~~	~~3~~	~~3~~		N/A	
06	Israel	15	7	16	23	24	22		3	8
07	Lithuania	14	26	21	18	14	26		10	1
08	Spain	25	10	15	19	8	18		19	
09	Estonia	26	22	26	5	25	20		16	
10	Ireland	4	2	8	25	17	5	7	8	3
11	Latvia	12	14	1	22	20	8	4	7	4
12	Greece	6	19	18	26	5	12		18	
13	United Kingdom	10	12	19	6	18	15		21	
14	Norway	21	6	7	13	22	14		11	
15	Italy	7	18	12	16	9	16		12	
16	Serbia	2	13	20	15	23	10	2	22	
17	Finland	23	15	23	3	15	13		9	2
18	Portugal	19	17	13	20	10	23		24	
19	Armenia	8	3	14	12	19	9	3	13	
20	Cyprus	17	24	24	14	13	25		15	
21	Switzerland	1	1	2	4	1	1	12	6	5
22	Slovenia	24	11	10	21	26	24		25	
23	Croatia	5	16	9	7	2	4	8	1	12
24	Georgia	18	5	17	24	21	17		23	
25	France	13	9	5	1	4	2	10	4	7
26	Austria	16	21	22	8	12	21		17	
