= Denmark in the Eurovision Song Contest 2026 =

- Eurovision Song Contest 2026
- Participating broadcaster: Danish Broadcasting Corporation (DR)
- Country: Denmark
- Selection process: Dansk Melodi Grand Prix 2026
- Selection date: 14 February 2026

Competing entry
- Song: "Før vi går hjem"
- Artist: Søren Torpegaard Lund
- Songwriters: Clara Sofie Fabricius; Søren Torpegaard Lund; Thomas Meilstrup; Valdemar Littauer Bendixen

Placement
- Semi-final result: Qualified (5th, 199 points)
- Final result: 7th, 243 points

Participation chronology

Denmark was represented at the Eurovision Song Contest 2026 with the song "Før vi går hjem", written by Clara Sofie Fabricius, Søren Torpegaard Lund, Thomas Meilstrup and Valdemar Littauer Bendixen, and performed by Torpegaard Lund himself. The Danish participating broadcaster, the Danish Broadcasting Corporation (DR), organised the national final Dansk Melodi Grand Prix 2026 in order to select its entry for the contest.

== Background ==
Prior to the 2026 contest, the Danish Broadcasting Corporation (DR) had participated in the Eurovision Song Contest representing Denmark fifty-two times since its first entry in 1957. It had won the contest, to this point, on three occasions: in 1963 with the song "Dansevise" performed by Grethe and Jørgen Ingmann, in 2000 with the song "Fly on the Wings of Love" performed by Olsen Brothers, and in 2013 with the song "Only Teardrops" performed by Emmelie de Forest. Since the introduction of semi-finals in 2004, it had failed to qualify to the final eight times. In 2025, "Hallucination" performed by Sissal qualified Denmark to the final for the first time since 2019, ultimately placing 23rd.

As part of its duties as participating broadcaster, DR organises the selection of its entry in the Eurovision Song Contest and broadcasts the event in the country. DR confirmed its intentions to participate at the 2026 contest on 23 May 2025. The broadcaster had selected all but one of its Eurovision entries thus far through the national final Dansk Melodi Grand Prix. On 11 June 2025, DR announced that Dansk Melodi Grand Prix 2026 would be organised in order to select its entry for 2026.

== Before Eurovision ==
=== Dansk Melodi Grand Prix 2026 ===
Dansk Melodi Grand Prix 2026 was the 56th edition of Dansk Melodi Grand Prix, the music competition that selects Denmark's entries for the Eurovision Song Contest. The event was held on 14 February 2026 at the Arena Nord in Frederikshavn, hosted by Sara Bro and Alex Høgh Andersen, and broadcast on DR1 as well as streamed online at DRTV. The show was also broadcast in the Faroe Islands on KvF as well as streamed online at kvf.fo. The national final was watched by 784,000 viewers in Denmark.

==== Format ====
Eight songs competed in one show where the winner was determined over two rounds of voting. In the first round, the top three songs based on the combination of votes from a public vote and a 20-member jury panel qualified to the superfinal. In the superfinal, the winner was determined again by the votes of the jury and public. The jury panel was composed of 10 international members and 10 Danish members, while viewers were able to vote via SMS or a mobile application specifically designed for the competition. Viewers using the app were provided with three free votes for each song per round.

Danish jury members
- Phillip Jensen
- Gustav Edeling Thirion
- Mikkel Bülow
- Inge Høeg Lauridsen
- Marie Vilén
- Jesper Oddershede
- Martin Theis Pedersen
- Jonas Lexberg Leth
- Allan Jensen
- Bettina Brandt

International jury members
- Germany: Felix Rachow
- Sweden: Amanda Karlsson
- Switzerland: Melisa Kaymaz
- United Kingdom: Emma Millen
- Australia: Lachlan Woods
- France: Benjamin Léveque
- Bulgaria: Vasil Ivanov
- Romania: Alexandru Busa
- Finland: Teija Käärmekoski
- Austria: Michael Peterseil

==== Competing entries ====
DR opened a submission period between 2 July and 2 November 2025. At least one of the lyricists, composers or artists must be a citizen of Denmark, the Faroe Islands or Greenland, or have a strong connection to Denmark in order to qualify to compete. The broadcaster also invited industry representatives and record companies to submit entries. A selection committee of industry professionals alongside several Danish and international focus groups selected eight songs from the entries submitted to the broadcaster. DR held a press meet and greet at the Koncerthuset in Copenhagen on 22 January 2026, where the competing artists and songs were officially presented. Among the competing artists was Sissal, who represented Denmark in 2025. The two returning DMGP entrants are Sander Sanchez, who competed in 2020, and Søren Torpegaard Lund, who competed in 2023.

Artist	Song	Songwriter(s)
Emil Otto	"Copenhagen Noir"	Emil Otto Daugaard; Joachim Ersgaard; Marcus Winther-John
Ericka Jane	"Death of Me"	Daniel Scheffmann; Ericka Jane Pedersen; Johannes Bruun; Ole Bjørn Sørensen
Lasse Skriver	"Roaring Heart"	August Møller Fogh; Karl-Frederik Reichhardt; Lasse Skriver; Thomas Baxter
Late Runner	"Can U Feel It?"	Asger Tarpgaard; Christian Vagn; Jesper Mortensen; Tanja Simonsen
Myrkur	"Touch My Love and Die"	Amalie Bruun; Søren Mikkelsen
Sander Sanchez	"Two Spirits"	Lise Cabble; Marcus Winther-John; Rasmus Rex; Sander Sanchez
Sissal	"Infinity"	Christopher Rohde-Frisk; Jimmy "Joker" Thörnfeldt; Joy Deb; Linnea Deb; Malte Johansen; Sissal Jóhanna Norðberg Niclasen
Søren Torpegaard Lund	"Før vi går hjem"	Clara Sofie Fabricius; Søren Torpegaard Lund; Thomas Meilstrup; Valdemar Littauer Bendixen

==== Final ====
The final took place on 14 February 2026. In the first round of voting, the top three advanced to a superfinal based on the votes of a 20-member jury (50%) and a public vote (50%). In the superfinal, the winner, "Før vi går hjem" performed by Søren Torpegaard Lund, was selected by the public and jury vote. In addition to the performances of the competing entries, Annika Aakjær and Sofie1998 performed as interval acts.

Final – 14 February 2026
R/O	Artist	Song	Result
1	Sander Sanchez	"Two Spirits"	Eliminated
2	Late Runner	"Can U Feel It?"	Eliminated
3	Søren Torpegaard Lund	"Før vi går hjem"	Advanced
4	Sissal	"Infinity"	Advanced
5	Emil Otto	"Copenhagen Noir"	Eliminated
6	Myrkur	"Touch My Love and Die"	Eliminated
7	Lasse Skriver	"Roaring Heart"	Eliminated
8	Ericka Jane	"Death of Me"	Advanced

Superfinal – 14 February 2026
R/O	Artist	Song	Jury	Televote	Total	Place
1	Søren Torpegaard Lund	"Før vi går hjem"	19	20	39	1
2	Sissal	"Infinity"	17	13	30	3
3	Ericka Jane	"Death of Me"	14	17	31	2

== At Eurovision ==
The Eurovision Song Contest 2026 took place at the Wiener Stadthalle in Vienna, Austria, and consisted of two semi-finals held on the respective dates of 12 and 14 May and the final on 16 May 2026. All nations with the exceptions of the host country and the "Big Four" (France, Germany, Italy and the United Kingdom) were required to qualify from one of two semi-finals in order to compete for the final; the top ten countries from each semi-final progressed to the final. On 12 January 2026, an allocation draw was held to determine which of the two semi-finals, as well as which half of the show, each country performed in; the European Broadcasting Union (EBU) split up the competing countries into different pots based on voting patterns from previous contests, with countries with favourable voting histories put into the same pot.

The two semi-finals and final were broadcast on DR1 with commentary by Ole Tøpholm. DR appointed Sissal, who represented Denmark the previous year, as its spokesperson to announce the Danish votes during the final.

=== Semi-final ===
Denmark performed in the second semi-final in the 10th position. Denmark qualified to the final.

=== Final ===
Denmark performed first in the grand final. Denmark finished in 7th place with 243 points.

=== Voting ===
==== Points awarded to Denmark ====
Points awarded to Denmark (Semi-Final 2)
Score	Televote	Jury
12 points	Australia; Norway	Norway
10 points	Albania	Armenia; Latvia; United Kingdom
8 points		Australia; Austria; France; Luxembourg
7 points	Ukraine	Albania; Czechia; Romania
6 points		Bulgaria; Cyprus; Malta
5 points	Latvia; Luxembourg	Switzerland
4 points	Czechia; Romania; Switzerland	Ukraine
3 points	Armenia; Azerbaijan; Malta	
2 points		Azerbaijan
1 point	Austria; Bulgaria; Rest of the World	

Points awarded to Denmark (Final)
Score	Televote	Jury
12 points	Norway	Czechia; Norway
10 points	Sweden	Austria; Croatia; Finland; France; Israel; Portugal; Sweden
8 points	Finland	Estonia
7 points	Azerbaijan; Ukraine	Romania
6 points	Armenia; Israel; Lithuania	Cyprus; Serbia; United Kingdom
5 points		Albania; Armenia; Australia; Latvia; Luxembourg
4 points	Georgia	Germany; Lithuania
3 points	Australia; Latvia; Poland	Switzerland
2 points	Estonia	
1 point	Czechia	Bulgaria; San Marino

==== Points awarded by Denmark ====
Points awarded by Denmark (Semi-final 2)
Score	Televote	Jury
12 points	Norway	Bulgaria
10 points	Bulgaria	Australia
8 points	Ukraine	Czechia
7 points	Australia	Luxembourg
6 points	Luxembourg	Malta
5 points	Romania	Romania
4 points	Albania	Latvia
3 points	Czechia	Armenia
2 points	Cyprus	Ukraine
1 point	Malta	Cyprus

Points awarded by Denmark (Final)
Score	Televote	Jury
12 points	Bulgaria	Bulgaria
10 points	Norway	Sweden
8 points	Finland	Finland
7 points	Ukraine	Israel
6 points	Sweden	Italy
5 points	Australia	Czechia
4 points	Romania	Australia
3 points	Moldova	France
2 points	Israel	Cyprus
1 point	Albania	Romania

==== Detailed voting results ====
Each participating broadcaster assembles a seven-member jury panel consisting of music industry professionals who are citizens of the country they represent and two of which have to be between 18 and 25 years old. Each jury, and individual jury member, is required to meet a strict set of criteria regarding professional background, as well as diversity in gender and age. No member of a national jury was permitted to be related in any way to any of the competing acts in such a way that they cannot vote impartially and independently. The individual rankings of each jury member as well as the nation's televoting results were released shortly after the grand final.

The following members comprised the Danish jury:

- Anis Basim Moujahid (represented Denmark in the Eurovision Song Contest 2014)
- Cristian Oprea
- Karl-Frederik Reichhardt
- Oliver Moesgaard Adelborg
- Birgitte Næss-Schmidt
- Lise Cabble
- Svea Stegmann

Detailed voting results from Denmark (Semi-final 2)
R/O	Country	Jury									Televote	
R/O	Country	Juror A	Juror B	Juror C	Juror D	Juror E	Juror F	Juror G	Rank	Points	Rank	Points
01	Bulgaria	2	2	2	5	13	5	2	1	12	2	10
02	Azerbaijan	10	3	10	14	12	13	7	13		14	
03	Romania	1	10	7	2	9	9	8	6	5	6	5
04	Luxembourg	14	11	4	7	2	4	1	4	7	5	6
05	Czechia	6	4	1	9	4	11	3	3	8	8	3
06	Armenia	12	7	6	13	10	1	14	8	3	13	
07	Switzerland	4	12	11	11	6	10	9	12		11	
08	Cyprus	11	6	9	8	14	6	4	10	1	9	2
09	Latvia	5	5	12	12	1	14	6	7	4	12	
10	Denmark											
11	Australia	8	1	3	1	8	7	5	2	10	4	7
12	Ukraine	9	14	5	3	5	12	13	9	2	3	8
13	Albania	13	9	13	6	11	8	10	14		7	4
14	Malta	3	8	14	4	3	2	11	5	6	10	1
15	Norway	7	13	8	10	7	3	12	11		1	12

Detailed voting results from Denmark (Final)
R/O	Country	Jury									Televote	
R/O	Country	Juror A	Juror B	Juror C	Juror D	Juror E	Juror F	Juror G	Rank	Points	Rank	Points
01	Denmark											
02	Germany	21	21	11	22	13	10	21	20		23	
03	Israel	1	24	17	1	10	23	4	4	7	9	2
04	Belgium	18	22	23	11	17	19	22	22		22	
05	Albania	13	16	16	12	16	8	11	17		10	1
06	Greece	17	9	6	19	18	18	10	16		15	
07	Ukraine	7	23	7	15	23	21	7	15		4	7
08	Australia	16	10	2	16	7	7	3	7	4	6	5
09	Serbia	15	18	22	21	21	24	24	24		20	
10	Malta	5	3	18	6	14	16	9	11		17	
11	Czechia	6	17	1	4	8	11	12	6	5	16	
12	Bulgaria	2	1	3	3	5	3	8	1	12	1	12
13	Croatia	20	13	14	20	2	12	14	14		14	
14	United Kingdom	14	20	24	23	11	14	20	21		24	
15	France	3	19	15	8	6	15	2	8	3	13	
16	Moldova	24	12	12	13	15	9	16	18		8	3
17	Finland	8	8	5	18	3	5	1	3	8	3	8
18	Poland	19	14	8	14	19	1	17	12		12	
19	Lithuania	23	15	21	24	12	20	18	23		18	
20	Sweden	4	6	4	9	1	4	15	2	10	5	6
21	Cyprus	11	5	9	10	4	6	13	9	2	19	
22	Italy	10	4	10	5	24	2	6	5	6	11	
23	Norway	22	2	13	7	20	13	19	13		2	10
24	Romania	9	11	19	2	9	17	5	10	1	7	4
25	Austria	12	7	20	17	22	22	23	19		21	
