= Linnea Deb =

Swedish actor and songwriter (born 1977)

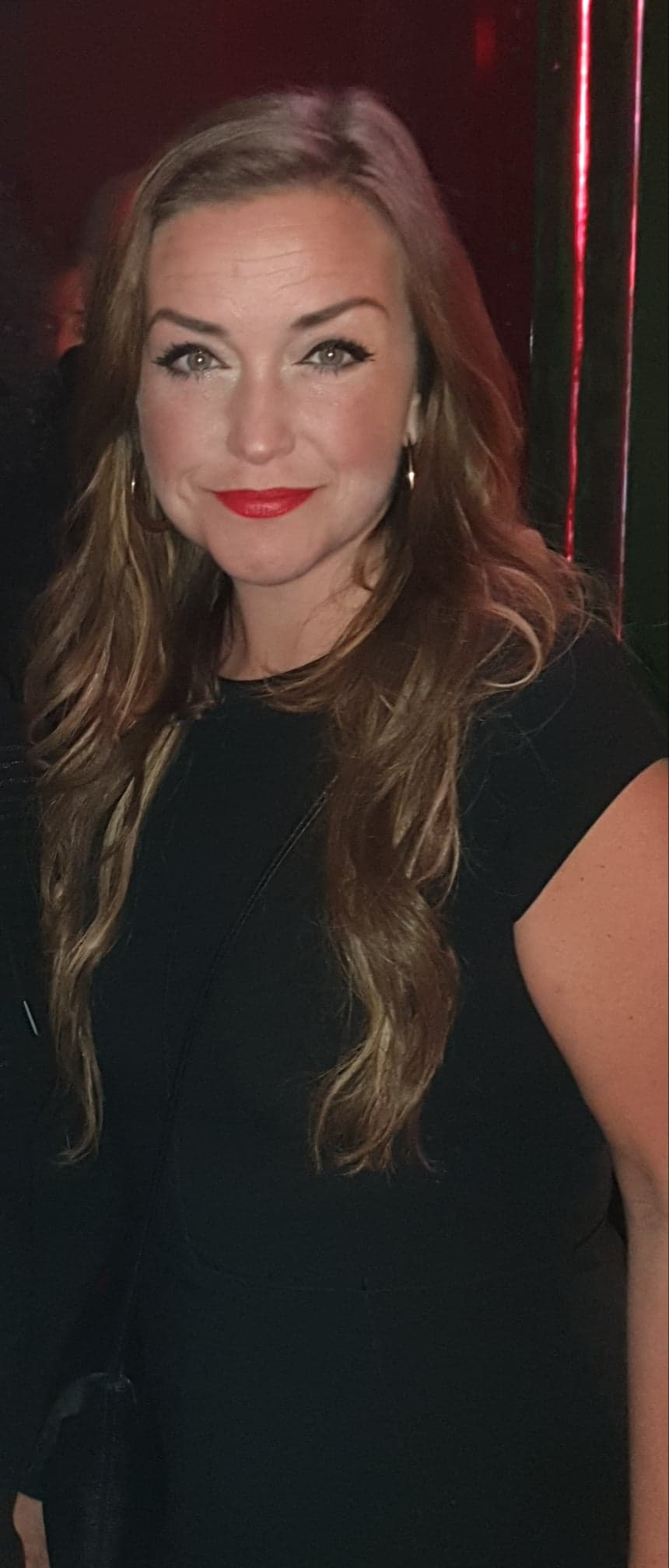
- Deb during Melodifestivalen 2019

Background information
- Born: Linnéa Mary Hansdotter Sporre; 23 July 1977 (age 49)
- Genres: Pop; pop rock; electropop; R&B
- Occupations: Singer; songwriter; record producer
- Label: Northbound Music Group

Linnéa Mary Hansdotter Deb (née Sporre; born 23 July 1977), known professionally as Linnea Deb, is a Swedish singer, songwriter, and record producer. She has worked with artists such as Fifth Harmony, JoJo, MiC Lowry and Akon.

Deb is signed to Northbound Music Publishing in Stockholm, where she is a member of the production team The Family together with Joy Deb and Anton Hård af Segerstad. Earlier (2013-2016) the group was signed to BMG Publishing.

== Early career ==
In her early career Linnea sang in several choirs and she toured with Ace of Base and Carola. Also, she has been choiring for several different albums and songs, one of them being "Cara Mia" with Swedish artist Måns Zelmerlöw.

In 2012, Linnea co-wrote Ulrik Munther’s album with the same name, Ulrik Munther, which immediately reached position 1 on Swedish album chart and the single "Boy’s Don't Cry", which features on the album, was sold gold.

== Eurovision Song Contest ==
Linnea Deb, alongside Joy Deb, is notable for her work in the Eurovision Song Contest, both in the contest and in national selections. They are most present in Sweden's annual Eurovision selection Melodifestivalen, in which they have four wins. The first winning song in 2013, "You" by Robin Stjernberg, broke a Swedish record for most played song in one day and it got nominated for a Swedish Grammis as Song of the Year 2014. The second winning song, "Heroes" performed by Måns Zelmerlöw in 2015, won the Eurovision Song Contest 2015 and sold 5× Platinum in Sweden and Gold in Spain, Norway and Austria. In 2021 they won Melodifestivalen for a third time with Voices by Tusse. They won Melodifestivalen on a fourth occasion in 2024 with "Unforgettable", performed by Marcus & Martinus. Their Melodifestivalen entries in 2014, 2021 and 2023 finished second.

Year	Country	Song	Artist	Co-written with	Final	Points	Semi	Points
2013	Sweden	"You"	Robin Stjernberg	Joy Deb, Robin Stjernberg, Joakim Harestad Haukaas	14	62	Host Country	
2015	Sweden	"Heroes"	Måns Zelmerlöw	Joy Deb, Anton Malmberg Hård af Segerstad	1	365	1	217
2018	Finland	"Monsters"	Saara Aalto	Joy Deb, Saara Aalto, Ki Fitzgerald	25	46	10	108
2020	Denmark	"Yes"	Ben and Tan	Jimmy Jansson, Emil Rosendal Lei	Contest cancelled			
2021	San Marino	"Adrenalina"	Senhit	Joy Deb, Chanel Tukia, Tramar Dillard, Jimmy "Joker" Thörnfeldt, Kenny Silverdique, Malou Linn, Eloise Ruotsalainen, Suzi Pancenkov, Senhit Zadik Zadik, Thomas Stengaard	22	50	9	118
2021	Sweden	"Voices"	Tusse	Joy Deb, Jimmy "Joker" Thörnfeldt, Anderz Wrethov	14	109	7	142
2024	Malta	"Loop"	Sarah Bonnici	Joy Deb, John Emil Johansson, Kevin Lee, Sebastian Pritchard-James, Liere Gotxi Angel, Matthew James Borg, Michael Joe Cini, Sarah Bonnici	Failed to qualify		16	13
2024	Sweden	"Unforgettable"	Marcus & Martinus	Joy Deb, Jimmy "Joker" Thörnfeldt, Marcus Gunnarsen, Martinus Gunnarsen	9	174	Host Country	
2025	Denmark	"Hallucination"	Sissal	Chris Rohde-Frisk, Lina Spangsberg, Malthe Johansen, Marcus Winther-John, Melanie Wehbe	23	47	8	61

== International releases ==
Linnea has also written and produced several international hits. She co-wrote the first record "Top Down" on Fifth Harmony's Reflection album. Also, Linnea and her production team wrote and produced JoJo's comeback single "Save My Soul". Linnea has also co-written the Polish artists Margaret's single "Cool Me Down" which was sold double platinum in Poland and gold in Sweden.

In 2016, "Oh Lord" was released with the British vocal harmony boy band Mic Lowry, which was their debut single and it was written by Joy, Linnea Deb, Anton Hård af Segerstad, Augustine Grant and Phil Collins, as the song contains lyrics and music from Phil Collins' song "In the Air Tonight".

== Personal life ==
Deb is of partial Finnish descent through her parents.

== List of written songs ==
Title	Year	Artist	Album	Co-written with
"Olympia"	2006	Ch!pz	Past:Present:Future	Joy Deb
"Studio 54"	2006	Ch!pz	Past:Present:Future	Joy Deb
"Sticks and Stones"	2011	Ulrik Munther	Ulrik Munther	Ulrik Munther, David Jackson, Johan Åberg, Joy Deb
"Boys Don't Cry"	2011	Ulrik Munther	Ulrik Munther	Ulrik Munther, David Jackson, Johan Åberg, Joy Deb
"King of Our Days"	2011	Ulrik Munther	Ulrik Munther	Ulrik Munther, David Jackson, Johan Åberg, Joy Deb
"Moments Ago"	2011	Ulrik Munther	Ulrik Munther	Ulrik Munther, David Jackson, Johan Åberg, Joy Deb
"Kill for Lies"	2011	Ulrik Munther	Ulrik Munther	Ulrik Munther, David Jackson, Johan Åberg, Joy Deb
"Fake It"	2011	Ulrik Munther	Ulrik Munther	Ulrik Munther, David Jackson, Johan Åberg, Joy Deb
"Alburn Road"	2011	Ulrik Munther	Ulrik Munther	Ulrik Munther, David Jackson, Johan Åberg, Joy Deb
"The Box"	2011	Ulrik Munther	Ulrik Munther	Ulrik Munther, David Jackson, Johan Åberg, Joy Deb
"Heroes in Defeat (Change Your Mind)"	2011	Ulrik Munther	Ulrik Munther	Ulrik Munther, David Jackson, Johan Åberg, Joy Deb
"Life"	2011	Ulrik Munther	Ulrik Munther	Ulrik Munther, David Jackson, Johan Åberg, Joy Deb
"Fool"	2011	Ulrik Munther	Ulrik Munther	Ulrik Munther, David Jackson, Johan Åberg, Joy Deb
"#Fail"	2014	Oscar Zia	I Don't Know How to Dance	Charlie Mason, Joy Deb, Joakim Harestad
"Ballare con me"	2014	Oscar Zia	I Don't Know How to Dance	
"Keep the Love"	2014	Amanda Fondell	Because I Am	Amanda Fondell
"Engine"	2014	Isac Elliot	Follow Me	Victor Thell, Maria Jane Smith, Kevin Högdahl, Anton Hård af Segerstad
"Top Down"	2015	Fifth Harmony	Reflection	Joy Deb, Anton Hård af Segerstad, Maurice Simmonds
"Save My Soul"	2015	JoJo	III	Joanna Levesque, Nikki Flores, Joy Deb, Anton Hård af Segerstad
"Still That Girl"	2015	Ann Sophie	Silver into Gold	Joy Deb, Charlie Mason
"Oh Lord"	2016	MiC LOWRY	—N/a	Joy Deb, Anton Hård af Segerstad, Ray "Augustine Grant" Jacobs
"Free Somebody"	2016	Luna	Free Somebody	Anton Hård af Segerstad, Joy Deb, Joanna Levesque, Kim Min-ji, Seo Ji-eum, JQ
"Keep On Doin'"	2016	Luna	Free Somebody	Sara Forsberg, Anton Hård af Segerstad, Joy Deb, Le`mon, JQ, Bae Seong-hyeon
"Therapy"	2016	Kim Cesarion	—N/a	Kim Cesarion, Anton Hård af Segerstad, Joy Deb, Trey Campbell
"Paradise"	2017	The Rasmus	Dark Matters	Lauri Ylönen, Pauli Rantasalmi, Joy Deb, Anton Hård af Segerstad
"Something in the Dark"	2017	The Rasmus	Dark Matters	Lauri Ylönen, Pauli Rantasalmi, Joy Deb, Anton Hård af Segerstad
"Wonderman"	2017	The Rasmus	Dark Matters	Lauri Ylönen, Pauli Rantasalmi, Joy Deb, Anton Hård af Segerstad
"Nothing"	2017	The Rasmus	Dark Matters	Lauri Ylönen, Pauli Rantasalmi, Joy Deb, Anton Hård af Segerstad
"Empire"	2017	The Rasmus	Dark Matters	Lauri Ylönen, Pauli Rantasalmi, Joy Deb, Anton Hård af Segerstad
"Crystalline"	2017	The Rasmus	Dark Matters	Lauri Ylönen, Pauli Rantasalmi, Joy Deb, Anton Hård af Segerstad
"Black Days"	2017	The Rasmus	Dark Matters	Lauri Ylönen, Pauli Rantasalmi, Joy Deb, Anton Hård af Segerstad
"Silver Night"	2017	The Rasmus	Dark Matters	Lauri Ylönen, Pauli Rantasalmi, Joy Deb, Anton Hård af Segerstad
"Delirium"	2017	The Rasmus	Dark Matters	Lauri Ylönen, Pauli Rantasalmi, Joy Deb, Anton Hård af Segerstad
"Dragons into Dreams"	2017	The Rasmus	Dark Matters	Lauri Ylönen, Pauli Rantasalmi, Joy Deb, Anton Hård af Segerstad
"Love Like This"	2017	FO&O	FO&O	Joy Deb, Anton Hård af Segerstad, Nate Cyphert
"My Everything"	2017	Anastacia	Evolution	Anastacia, Anders Bagge, Can "Stress" Canatan, Ninos Hanna, Victor Thell
"One Flight Away"	2017	Marcus & Martinus	Moments	Elias Näslin, Marcus Gunnarsen
"Happyland"	2018	Måns Zelmerlöw	Chameleon	Joy Deb, Anton Hård af Segerstad, Ola Svensson
"Hän"	2018	Saara Aalto	Wild Wild Wonderland	Saara Aalto, Joy Deb
"Dance"	2018	Saara Aalto	Wild Wild Wonderland	Saara Aalto, Matias Keskiruokanen
"All On You"	2018	LIAMOO	Journey	Anton Hård af Segerstad, Austin Mahone, Sean Garrett, Robert Villanueva, Joy Deb
"Lollipop"	2018	Margaret	—N/a	Alex P, Arash, Claydee, Victory
"One Night in Dubai" (featuring Helena Josefsson)	2019	Arash	—N/a	Nicolae Stan, Alex P, Victory, Hamidreza Yousefi, Robert Hicks, Radu Baisan, Thomas G:son, Robert Uhlmann, Arash
"Off Limits"	2019	Allysandra	—N/a	Melanie Wehbe, David Björk
"Loving You"	2019	John Lundvik	My Turn	John Lundvik, Anderz Wrethov, Elize Ryd, Henric Pierroff
"Home"	2019	Basshunter	—N/a	Thomas G:son, Robert Uhlmann, Jonas Altberg, Yei Gonzalez, Cedric Lorrain
"All The Things (I'm Not)"	2019	Drew Sycamore	Brutal	Joy Deb, Drew Sycamore
"No Eyes on Me"	2020	Justin Caruso	—N/a	Maia Wright, Justin Caruso, Andrej Kamnik, Albin Nordqvist
"Come to Me (64567)"	2020	Wiktoria	—N/a	Wiktoria Johansson, Joy Deb
"Temperatur" (featuring Dotter)	2020	Anis Don Demina	Artist	Anis Don Demina, Loui Maleoko, Joy Deb, Anderz Wrethov, Johanna Jansson
"Give Yourself to Me"	2020	Max George	—N/a	Max George, Anton Hård af Segerstad, Augustine Grant, Joy Deb
"Adrenalina"	2021	Senhit	—N/a	Chanel Tukia, Dillard Tramar, Jimmy Thörnfeldt, Joy Deb, Kenny Silverdique, Malou Linn Eloise Ruotsalainen, Senhit Zadik Zadik, Suzi Pancenkov, Thomas Stengaard
"Lucky Like That"	2022	Girls' Generation	Forever 1	Sebastian Thott, David Strääf

=== Melodifestivalen entries (Sweden) ===
Year	Artist	Title	Co-written with	Result
2012	Ulrik Munther	"Soldiers"	Ulrik Munther, Johan Åberg, Joy Deb, David Jackson	3rd
2013	Robin Stjernberg	"You"	Robin Stjernberg, Joy Deb, Joakim Harestad Haukaas	1st
2014	Ace Wilder	"Busy Doin' Nothin'"	Ace Wilder, Joy Deb	2nd
2014	EKO	"Red"	Joy Deb, Anna Lidman, Hannes Lundberg, Michael Ottosson	8th (Semi-final)
2014	Manda	"Glow"	Joy Deb, Melanie Wehbe, Charlie Mason	8th (Semi-final)
2014	Outtrigger	"Echo"	Joy Deb, Anton Hård af Segerstad, Outtrigger	Second Chance
2015	Måns Zelmerlöw	"Heroes"	Anton Hård af Segerstad, Joy Deb	1st
2016	Ace Wilder	"Don't Worry"	Joy Deb, Anton Hård af Segerstad, Ace Wilder, Behshad Ashnai, Martina Avacado	3rd
2016	Isa	"I Will Wait"	Anton Hård af Segerstad, Joy Deb, Pierre Yvess-Rossi, Nikki Flores	Second Chance
2016	Lisa Ajax	"My Heart Wants Me Dead"	Joy Deb, Anton Hård af Segerstad, Nikki Flores, Sara Forsberg	7th
2016	Molly Pettersson Hammar	"Hunger"	Joy Deb, Lisa Desmond, Anton Hård af Segerstad, Molly Pettersson Hammar	Second Chance
2017	Lisa Ajax	"I Don't Give A"	Ola Svensson, Joy Deb, Anton Hård af Segerstad	9th
2017	Loreen	"Statements"	Lorine Talhaoui, Anton Hård af Segerstad, Joy Deb	Second Chance
2018	Dotter	"Cry"	Peter Boström, Thomas G:son, Johanna Jansson	6th (Semi-final)
2018	Margaret	"In My Cabana"	Anderz Wrethov, Arash Labaf, Robert Uhlmann	7th
2019	High15	"No Drama"	Joy Deb, Kate Tizzard	6th (Semi-final)
2019	Mohombi	"Hello"	Alexandru Florin Cotoi, Thomas G:son, Mohombi Moupondo	5th
2019	Nano	"Chasing Rivers"	Lise Cabble, Joy Deb, Thomas G:son, Nano Omar	8th
2019	Wiktoria	"Not with Me"	Joy Deb, Wiktoria Johansson	6th
2021	Alvaro Estrella	"Bailá Bailá"	Anderz Wrethov, Jimmy "Joker" Thörnfeldt	10th
2021	Eric Saade	"Every Minute"	Eric Saade, Joy Deb, Jimmy "Joker" Thörnfeldt	2nd
2021	Kadiatou	"One Touch"	Joy Deb, Jimmy "Joker" Thörnfeldt, Anderz Wrethov	6th (Semi-final)
2021	Tusse	"Voices"	Joy Deb, Jimmy "Joker" Thörnfeldt, Anderz Wrethov	1st
2022	Alvaro Estrella	"Suave"	Jimmy "Joker" Thörnfeldt, Joy Deb, Alvaro Estrella	5th Semi-final
2022	Malou Prytz	"Bananas"	Alice Gernandt, Jimmy "Joker" Thörnfeldt, Joy Deb	6th (Semi-final)
2023	Ida-Lova	"Låt hela stan se på"	Andreas "Giri" Lindbergh, Ida-Lova Lind, Joy Deb	4th (Heat)
2023	Kiana	"Where Did You Go"	Jimmy "Joker" Thörnfeldt, Joy Deb	6th
2023	Marcus & Martinus	"Air"	Jimmy "Joker" Thörnfeldt, Joy Deb, Marcus Gunnarsen, Martinus Gunnarsen	2nd
2023	Smash Into Pieces	"Six Feet Under"	Andreas "Giri" Lindbergh, Benjamin Jennebo, Chris Adam Hedman Sörbye, Jimmy "Joker" Thörnfeldt, Joy Deb, Per Bergquist	3rd
2024	Albin Tingwall	"Done Getting Over You"	Jimmy "Joker" Thörnfeldt, Joy Deb	7th (Final qualification)
2024	Marcus & Martinus	"Unforgettable"	Jimmy "Joker" Thörnfeldt, Joy Deb, Marcus Gunnarsen, Martinus Gunnarsen	1st
2024	Smash Into Pieces	"Heroes Are Calling"	Andreas "Giri" Lindbergh, Benjamin Jennebo, Chris Adam Hedman Sörbye, Jimmy "Joker" Thörnfeldt, Joy Deb, Per Bergquist	3rd
2025	Angelino	"Teardrops"	Jimmy "Joker" Thörnfeldt, Joy Deb, Tusse Chiza	4th (Heat)
2025	Maja Ivarsson	"Kamikaze Life"	Andreas "Giri" Lindbergh, Jimmy "Joker" Thörnfeldt, Joy Deb, Maja Ivarsson	11th
2026	Timo Räisänen	"Ingenting är efter oss"	Andreas "Giri" Lindbergh, Jimmy "Joker" Thörnfeldt, Joy Deb, Lina Räisänen, Timo Räisänen	4th (Heat)

=== A Dal entries (Hungary) ===
Year	Artist	Title	Co-written with	Result
2015	Kati Wolf	"Ne engedj el"	Martin Ankelius, Sebastian Zelle, Péter Krajczár, Eszter Major	5th

=== Melodi Grand Prix entries (Norway) ===
Year	Artist	Title	Co-written with	Result
2015	Erlend Bratland	"Thunderstruck"	Joy Deb, Erlend Bratland	2nd
2026	Emma	"Northern Lights"	Joy Deb, Andreas "Giri" Lindbergh, Jimmy "Joker" Thörnfeldt, Emma Gunnarsen	3rd

=== Krajowe Eliminacje entries (Poland) ===
Year	Artist	Title	Co-written with	Result
2016	Margaret	"Cool Me Down"	Robert Uhlmann, Arash Labaf, Alex Papaconstantinou, Anderz Wrethov, Viktor Svensson	2nd

=== Uuden Musiikin Kilpailu entries (Finland) ===
Year	Artist	Title	Co-written with	Result
2018	Saara Aalto	"Monsters"	Saara Aalto, Joy Deb, Ki Fitzgerald	1st
2026	Chachi	"Cherry Cake"	Johannes Naukkarinen, Olivia Hildén	4th

=== Dansk Melodi Grand Prix entries (Denmark) ===
Year	Artist	Title	Co-written with	Result
2020	Ben & Tan	"Yes"	Emil Lei, Jimmy Jansson	1st
2025	Sissal	"Hallucination"	Chris Rohde-Frisk, Lina Spangsberg, Malthe Johansen, Marcus Winther-John, Melanie Wehbe	1st
2026	Sissal	"Infinity"	Chris Rohde-Frisk, Jimmy "Joker" Thörnfeldt, Joy Deb, Malte Johansen, Sissal Jóhanna Norðberg Niclasen	3rd

=== Dora entries (Croatia) ===
Year	Artist	Title	Co-written with	Result
2020	Mia Negovetić	"When It Comes to You"	Anderz Wrethov, Denniz Jamm, Mia Negovetić	2nd
2021	Mia Negovetić	"She's Like a Dream"	Mia Negovetić, Denniz Jamm, Denise Kertes	3rd

=== Eesti Laul entries (Estonia) ===
Year	Artist	Title	Co-written with	Result
2022	Elysa	"Fire"	Ellen Benediktson, Andreas Stone, Elisa Kolk, Indrek Rahumaa	3rd
2027	Traffic	"Laava"	Stig Rästa, Victor Crone, Fred Krieger	TBA

=== Una Voce per San Marino entries (San Marino) ===
Year	Artist	Title	Co-written with	Result
2023	Daniel Schuhmacher	"Skin I'm In"	Denniz Jamm, Doron Medalie, Daniel Schuhmacher	Eliminated (Semi-final)

=== Malta Eurovision Song Contest entries (Malta) ===
Year	Artist	Title	Co-written with	Result
2024	Ryan Hili	"Karma"	Andreas "Giri" Lindbergh, Joy Deb	3rd
2025	Kantera	"LalaRataTakeke LalaRataKabum"	Kantera, Tom Oehler, Joe Julian Farrugia	3rd
2025	Kristy Spiteri	"Heaven Sent"	Tom Oehler, Kristy Spiteri, Teodora Špirić	2nd
2026	Denise	"Trophy"	Denise Mercieca, Marcus Winther-John, Owen Vos	6th

=== Söngvakeppnin entries (Iceland) ===
Year	Artist	Title	Co-written with	Result
2025	Dagur Sig	"Flugdrekar"/"Carousel"	Thorsteinn Einarsson, Einar Lövdahl, Joy Deb, Andreas "Giri" Lindbergh	Eliminated (Semi-final)

=== Vidbir entries (Ukraine) ===
Year	Artist	Title	Co-written with	Result
2026	Jerry Heil	"Catharticus (Prayer)"	Yana Shemaieva, Joy Deb, Denys Sokolov	3rd
