= Denmark in the Eurovision Song Contest 2025 =

- Eurovision Song Contest 2025
- Participating broadcaster: Danish Broadcasting Corporation (DR)
- Country: Denmark
- Selection process: Dansk Melodi Grand Prix 2025
- Selection date: 1 March 2025

Competing entry
- Song: "Hallucination"
- Artist: Sissal
- Songwriters: Chris Rohde-Frisk; Line Spangsberg; Linnea Deb; Malthe Johansen; Marcus Winther-John; Melanie Wehbe; Sissal Jóhanna Norðberg Niclasen

Placement
- Semi-final result: Qualified (8th, 61 points)
- Final result: 23rd, 47 points

Participation chronology

Denmark was represented at the Eurovision Song Contest 2025 with the song "Hallucination", written by Chris Rohde-Frisk, Line Spangsberg, Linnea Deb, Malthe Johansen, Marcus Winther-John, Melanie Wehbe, and Sissal Jóhanna Norðberg Niclasen, and performed by Sissal herself. The Danish participating broadcaster, the Danish Broadcasting Corporation (DR), organised the national final Dansk Melodi Grand Prix 2025 in order to select its entry for the contest.

Denmark was drawn to compete in the second semi-final of the Eurovision Song Contest which took place on 15 May 2025 and was later selected to perform in position 11. At the end of the show, "Hallucination" was announced among the top 10 entries of the second semi-final and hence qualified to compete in the final, marking the first qualification for the country since 2019. It was later revealed that Denmark placed eighth out of the sixteen participating countries in the semi-final with 61 points. In the final, Denmark performed in position 22 and placed twenty-third out of the 26 participating countries, scoring a total of 47 points.

== Background ==
Prior to the 2025 contest, the Danish Broadcasting Corporation (DR) had participated in the Eurovision Song Contest representing Denmark fifty-one times since its first entry in 1957. It had won the contest, to this point, on three occasions: in 1963 with the song "Dansevise" performed by Grethe and Jørgen Ingmann, in 2000 with the song "Fly on the Wings of Love" performed by Olsen Brothers, and in 2013 with the song "Only Teardrops" performed by Emmelie de Forest. Since the introduction of semi-finals in 2004, it had failed to qualify to the final eight times, including in 2024, when the song "Sand" performed by Saba placed 12th in the second semi-final.

As part of its duties as participating broadcaster, DR organises the selection of its entry in the Eurovision Song Contest and broadcasts the event in the country. The broadcaster had selected all but one of its Eurovision entries thus far through the national final Dansk Melodi Grand Prix. DR confirmed its intention to participate at the 2025 contest on 6 May 2024, announcing that Dansk Melodi Grand Prix would again be organised in order to select its entry for the contest.

== Before Eurovision ==
=== Dansk Melodi Grand Prix 2025 ===
Dansk Melodi Grand Prix 2025 was the 55th edition of Dansk Melodi Grand Prix (DMGP), the music competition that selects Denmark's entries for the Eurovision Song Contest. The event was held on 1 March 2025 at the Jyske Bank Boxen in Herning, hosted by Sara Bro and Stéphanie Surrugue and televised on DR1 as well as streamed online at DRTV. The national final was watched by 736,443 viewers in Denmark with a market share of 59.9%.

==== Format ====
Eight songs competed in one show where the winner was determined over two rounds of voting. In the first round, the top three songs based on the combination of votes from a public vote and a 20-member jury panel qualified to the superfinal. In the superfinal, the winner was determined again by the votes of the jury and public. The jury panel was composed of 10 international members and 10 Danish members, while viewers were able to vote via SMS or a mobile application specifically designed for the competition. Prior to the show, the public was provided with one free vote on the app to cast a vote each day between 24 and 28 February 2025, while viewers using the app during the show were also provided with one free vote. The live orchestra, present since the 2020 edition, was not used for this year.

Danish jury members
- Carsten Helmig Nilsson
- Clara Amalie Christiansen
- Jacob Mejer Nielsen
- Jesper Mejlvang
- Lise Hvid Bach
- Michael Hammerbo
- Mike Paudi
- Simon Falk
- Thomas Andreasen
- Tine Lesner

International jury members
- Albania: Andri Xhahu
- Belgium: Wim Dehandschutter
- Finland: Anni Lavi
- Greece: Maria Kozakou
- Portugal: Nina Pinto
- Serbia: Milica Fajgelj
- Spain: Adrián Valiente
- Sweden: Lizbet Brittsten
- Switzerland: Michel Imhof
- United Kingdom: Callum Rowe

==== Competing entries ====
DR opened a submission period between 16 September 2024 and 27 October 2024 for artists and composers to submit their entries. At least one of the lyricists, composers or artists must be a citizen of Denmark, the Faroe Islands or Greenland, or have a strong connection to Denmark in order to qualify to compete. A selection committee selected four songs from the entries submitted to the broadcaster, while an additional four songs were created in songwriting camps that featured Danish and international songwriters invited by DR to compete. The music producer of DMGP, Erik Struve Hansen, stated that the broadcaster had sought out "songs that both do well in DMGP and have potential in Eurovision". DR held a press meet and greet at the DR Byen in Copenhagen on 6 February 2025 where the competing artists and songs were announced and officially presented. Among the artists was Tim Schou who represented Denmark in 2011 as a member of A Friend in London.

Artist	Song	Songwriter(s)
Adel the Second	"The Unluckiest Boy Alive"	Oliver Adelborg; Søren Christensen
Andreas Kruse	"Hear My Prayer"	Andreas Kruse; Linda Dale; Malthe August; Rasmus "Majalle" Olsen
Hervé Toure	"Allez allez"	Christian Juncker; Hervé Toure; Jakob Groth
Maria Mathea	"Air"	Emil Adler Lei; Julie Aagaard; Maria Broberg
Mariya	"I Belong to Me"	Dino Medanhodzic; Jimmy Thörnfeldt; Julie Aagaard; Mariya Apollonia
Max Ulver	"Supernova"	Frederik Nordsø; Fridolin Nordsø; Remee Sigvardt Jackman
Sissal	"Hallucination"	Chris Rohde-Frisk; Line Spangsberg; Linnea Deb; Malthe Johansen; Marcus Winther-John; Melanie Wehbe
Tim Schou	"Proud"	Benjamin Rosenbohm; Emil Adler Lei; Joachim Ersgaard; Tim Schou

==== Final ====
The final took place on 1 March 2025. In the first round of voting the top three advanced to the superfinal based on the votes of a 20-member jury (50%) and a public vote (50%). In the superfinal, the winner, "Hallucination" performed by Sissal, was selected by the public and jury vote. In addition to the performances of the competing entries, Birthe Kjær and Saba, who won DMGP and represented Denmark in 1989 and 2024, respectively, performed as the interval act.

Final – 1 March 2025
R/O	Artist	Song	Result
1	Mariya	"I Belong to Me"	Eliminated
2	Tim Schou	"Proud"	Advanced
3	Max Ulver	"Supernova"	Eliminated
4	Hervé Toure	"Allez allez"	Eliminated
5	Maria Mathea	"Air"	Eliminated
6	Adel the Second	"The Unluckiest Boy Alive"	Advanced
7	Sissal	"Hallucination"	Advanced
8	Andreas Kruse	"Hear My Prayer"	Eliminated

Superfinal – 1 March 2025
R/O	Artist	Song	Jury	Televote	Total	Place
1	Tim Schou	"Proud"	14	23	37	2
2	Adel the Second	"The Unluckiest Boy Alive"	16	9	25	3
3	Sissal	"Hallucination"	20	18	38	1

== At Eurovision ==
The Eurovision Song Contest 2025 took place at St. Jakobshalle in Basel, Switzerland, and consisted of two semi-finals held on the respective dates of 13 and 15 May and the final on 17 May 2025. During the allocation draw held on 28 January 2025, Denmark was drawn to compete in the second semi-final, performing in the second half of the show. Sissal was later drawn to perform 11th, ahead of Georgia's Mariam Shengelia and before Czechia's Adonxs. Denmark qualified for the final.

The two semi-finals and final were broadcast on DR1 with commentary by Ole Tøpholm. DR appointed Sara Bro as its spokesperson to announce the Danish votes during the final.

=== Voting ===
==== Points awarded to Denmark ====
Points awarded to Denmark (Semi-final 2)
Score	Televote
12 points	
10 points	
8 points	Finland
7 points	
6 points	Australia; United Kingdom
5 points	Czechia; Ireland
4 points	Germany; Lithuania; Malta; Rest of the World
3 points	Armenia; Austria; France
2 points	Latvia; Montenegro
1 point	Israel; Luxembourg

Points awarded to Denmark (Final)
Score	Televote	Jury
12 points		
10 points		Georgia; United Kingdom
8 points		Austria
7 points		Italy
6 points		
5 points		Serbia
4 points		Australia
3 points		
2 points	Iceland	
1 point		Czechia

==== Points awarded by Denmark ====
Points awarded by Denmark (Semi-final 2)
Score	Televote
12 points	Israel
10 points	Finland
8 points	Latvia
7 points	Austria
6 points	Lithuania
5 points	Luxembourg
4 points	Greece
3 points	Australia
2 points	Ireland
1 point	Malta

Points awarded by Denmark (Final)
Score	Televote	Jury
12 points	Sweden	Latvia
10 points	Iceland	Switzerland
8 points	Israel	Italy
7 points	Poland	Sweden
6 points	Estonia	Finland
5 points	Finland	Austria
4 points	Ukraine	United Kingdom
3 points	Austria	Israel
2 points	Lithuania	Ukraine
1 point	Germany	Armenia

==== Detailed voting results ====
Each participating broadcaster assembles a five-member jury panel consisting of music industry professionals who are citizens of the country they represent. Each jury, and individual jury member, is required to meet a strict set of criteria regarding professional background, as well as diversity in gender and age. No member of a national jury was permitted to be related in any way to any of the competing acts in such a way that they cannot vote impartially and independently. The individual rankings of each jury member as well as the nation's televoting results were released shortly after the grand final.

The following members comprised the Danish jury:

- Anders Ugilt Andersen
- Mads Enggaard Jørgensen
- Peter Düring
- Anne Dorte Michelsen
- Katrine Muff Enevoldsen

Detailed voting results from Denmark (Semi-final 2)
R/O	Country	Televote	
R/O	Country	Rank	Points
01	Australia	8	3
02	Montenegro	15	
03	Ireland	9	2
04	Latvia	3	8
05	Armenia	12	
06	Austria	4	7
07	Greece	7	4
08	Lithuania	5	6
09	Malta	10	1
10	Georgia	14	
11	Denmark		
12	Czechia	11	
13	Luxembourg	6	5
14	Israel	1	12
15	Serbia	13	
16	Finland	2	10

Detailed voting results from Denmark (Final)
R/O	Country	Jury							Televote	
R/O	Country	Juror A	Juror B	Juror C	Juror D	Juror E	Rank	Points	Rank	Points
01	Norway	19	18	13	12	20	20		12	
02	Luxembourg	6	17	17	16	11	15		18	
03	Estonia	15	25	20	8	10	16		5	6
04	Israel	7	11	4	21	8	8	3	3	8
05	Lithuania	21	23	25	15	14	22		9	2
06	Spain	23	9	16	23	19	19		21	
07	Ukraine	13	21	21	3	6	9	2	7	4
08	United Kingdom	5	2	15	9	9	7	4	20	
09	Austria	4	3	12	5	15	6	5	8	3
10	Iceland	2	16	19	20	13	13		2	10
11	Latvia	3	1	5	7	3	1	12	11	
12	Netherlands	16	12	14	18	24	21		14	
13	Finland	9	8	2	6	5	5	6	6	5
14	Italy	12	10	6	1	1	3	8	13	
15	Poland	20	19	18	19	21	24		4	7
16	Germany	22	20	11	10	25	18		10	1
17	Greece	17	4	7	14	16	11		15	
18	Armenia	1	13	23	24	17	10	1	23	
19	Switzerland	11	6	1	4	2	2	10	19	
20	Malta	10	7	9	22	7	12		24	
21	Portugal	25	22	24	13	18	23		22	
22	Denmark									
23	Sweden	8	14	3	2	4	4	7	1	12
24	France	14	5	8	17	12	14		17	
25	San Marino	18	24	22	25	23	25		25	
26	Albania	24	15	10	11	22	17		16	
