= Sissal =

Faroese singer (born 1995)

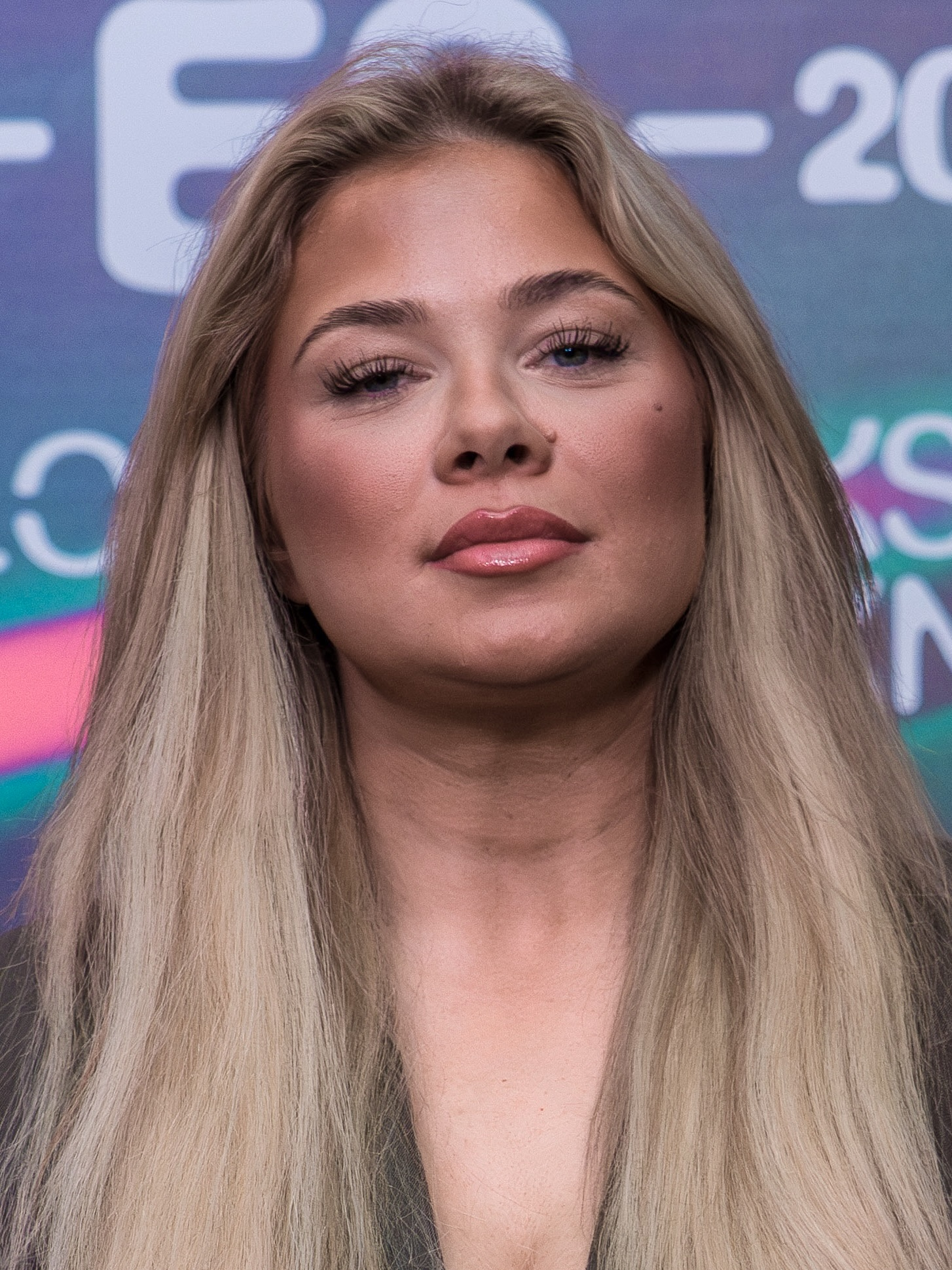
- Sissal in 2025

Background information
- Also known as: YÖHNA
- Born: Sissal Jóhanna Norðberg Niclasen; 13 February 1995 (age 31); Tórshavn, Faroe Islands
- Genre: Pop
- Occupation: Singer
- Instrument: Vocals
- Years active: 2005–present

Sissal Jóhanna Norðberg Niclasen (Faroese pronunciation: [ˈsɪsːal jɔuˈhanːa ˈnɔɹpɛɹk ˈniːklasɛn]) (born 13 February 1995), known mononymously as Sissal (Faroese pronunciation: [ˈsɪsːal]), is a Faroese singer. She represented Denmark in the Eurovision Song Contest 2025 with the song "Hallucination."

== Early life ==
Sissal was born in Tórshavn, the capital of the Faroe Islands, and is the daughter of Faroese glass artist Mikkalina Norðberg.

== Career ==
Sissal rose to prominence in 2005, when she won the Faroese children's singing competition Nósa Barnaprix with the song "Summarið er komið". In 2010, she won the annual singing competition Ársins Songrødd.

Sissal released her first EP Hear Me Now in 2025. In February 2025, she was announced as one of the eight participants of Dansk Melodi Grand Prix 2025 with the song "Hallucination". The combined jury and public vote ensured her victory and, consequently, the chance to represent Denmark in the Eurovision Song Contest 2025 in Basel. She is the second Faroese artist to represent Denmark in Eurovision after Reiley in 2023. She qualified from the second semi final on 15 May, ending a six-year non-qualification streak for Denmark in Eurovision and bringing them to the final for the first time since 2019. In the final she finished 23rd with 47 points.

In September 2025, she was announced as one of the ten celebrities competing in the 22nd season of Vild med dans, the Danish version of Dancing with the Stars, where she was partnered with professional dancer Eugen Miu. They were the fourth couple to be eliminated.

In January 2026, she returned to Dansk Melodi Grand Prix 2026 with the song "Infinity", marking her second consecutive participation in the Danish national selection. She finished in third place in the super final.

In May that year, she was the Danish spokesperson at that year's Eurovision Song Contest, giving the 12 points to the eventual winner, Bulgaria's Dara and her song "Bangaranga".

== Musical style ==
Sissal cites Norwegian singer Dagny and Swedish singer Robyn among her musical inspirations.

== Personal life ==
In 2020, Sissal moved to Copenhagen to launch her international music career. She has two daughters.

== Discography ==
=== Extended plays ===
List of EPs, with selected details
Title	Details
Hear Me Now	Released: 10 January 2025; Label: Pussy Records; Formats: Digital download, streaming

=== Singles ===
Title	Year	Peak chart positions								Album or EP
Title	Year	DEN Air.	GRE Intl.	LTU	SWE Heat.	SWI	UK Digital	UK Sales	UK Indie Break.	Album or EP
"Summarið er komið"	2005	—	*		—	—	—	—	—	Non-album singles
"Na Na Na"	2016	—	*		—	—	—	—	—	Non-album singles
"Anyone Better"	2017	—	*		—	—	—	—	—	Non-album singles
"Stop Thinking"	2020	—	—	—	—	—	—	—	—	Non-album singles
"Vanilla Spread"	2020	—	—	—	—	—	—	—	—	Non-album singles
"Deep End"	2024	—	—	—	—	—	—	—	—	Hear Me Now
"Far from Sober"	2024	—	—	—	—	—	—	—	—	Hear Me Now
"Hear Me Now"	2024	—	—	—	—	—	—	—	—	Hear Me Now
"Hallucination"	2025	8	87	54	8	51	8	8	10	Non-album singles
"I'm Not Crying, I'm Dancing"	2025	10	—	—	—	—	—	—	—	Non-album singles
"All I Want for Christmas" (with the Danish National Symphony Orchestra)	2025	—	—	—	—	—	—	—	—	Non-album singles
"Infinity"	2026	16	—	—	—	—	—	—	—	Non-album singles
"XOXO"	2026	8	—	—	—	—	—	—	—	Non-album singles
"Blond for dig"	2026	—	—	—	—	—	—	—	—	Non-album singles
"Ik'Jaloux"	2026	—	—	—	—	—	—	—	—	Non-album singles
"—" denotes a recording that did not chart or was not released in that territory. "*" denotes that the chart did not exist at that time.

== Awards and nominations ==
Year	Award	Category	Nominee(s)	Result	Ref.
2025	Eurovision Awards	Miss Congeniality	Herself	Won	
2025	Eurovision Awards	Certified Banger	Herself	Nominated	

Awards and achievements
Preceded by Saba with "Sand"	Denmark in the Eurovision Song Contest; 2025	Succeeded by Søren Torpegaard Lund with "Før vi går hjem"
