= Oh Lord (Mic Lowry song) =

Single by MiC LOWRY
- Released: 2016
- Recorded: 2016
- Genre: R&B
- Label: Universal Music
- Songwriter(s): Phil Collins; Joy Deb; Linnea Deb; Anton Hård af Segerstad; Ray 'Augustine Grant' Jacobs
- Producer(s): The Family

MiC LOWRY singles chronology
"Oh Lord" (2016)	"Whiskey Kisses" (2017)

Music video
- "Oh Lord" on YouTube

"Oh Lord" is a song by British vocal group and boyband MiC LOWRY and their debut single. It contains sampling and adaptation of the Phil Collins hit "In the Air Tonight" both in lyrics and music.

The song charted in the UK Singles Chart reaching number 54 on the chart. The band also released a music video of the hit.

Based on the success of the song, the band was chosen as Elvis Duran's Artist of the Month for March 2017 and were invited to perform the song nationwide in the United States through The Today Show presented by Kathie Lee Gifford and Hoda Kotb. They also performed live on The Wendy Williams Show on March 8, 2017.
