= Søren Torpegaard Lund =

Danish singer and actor (born 1998)

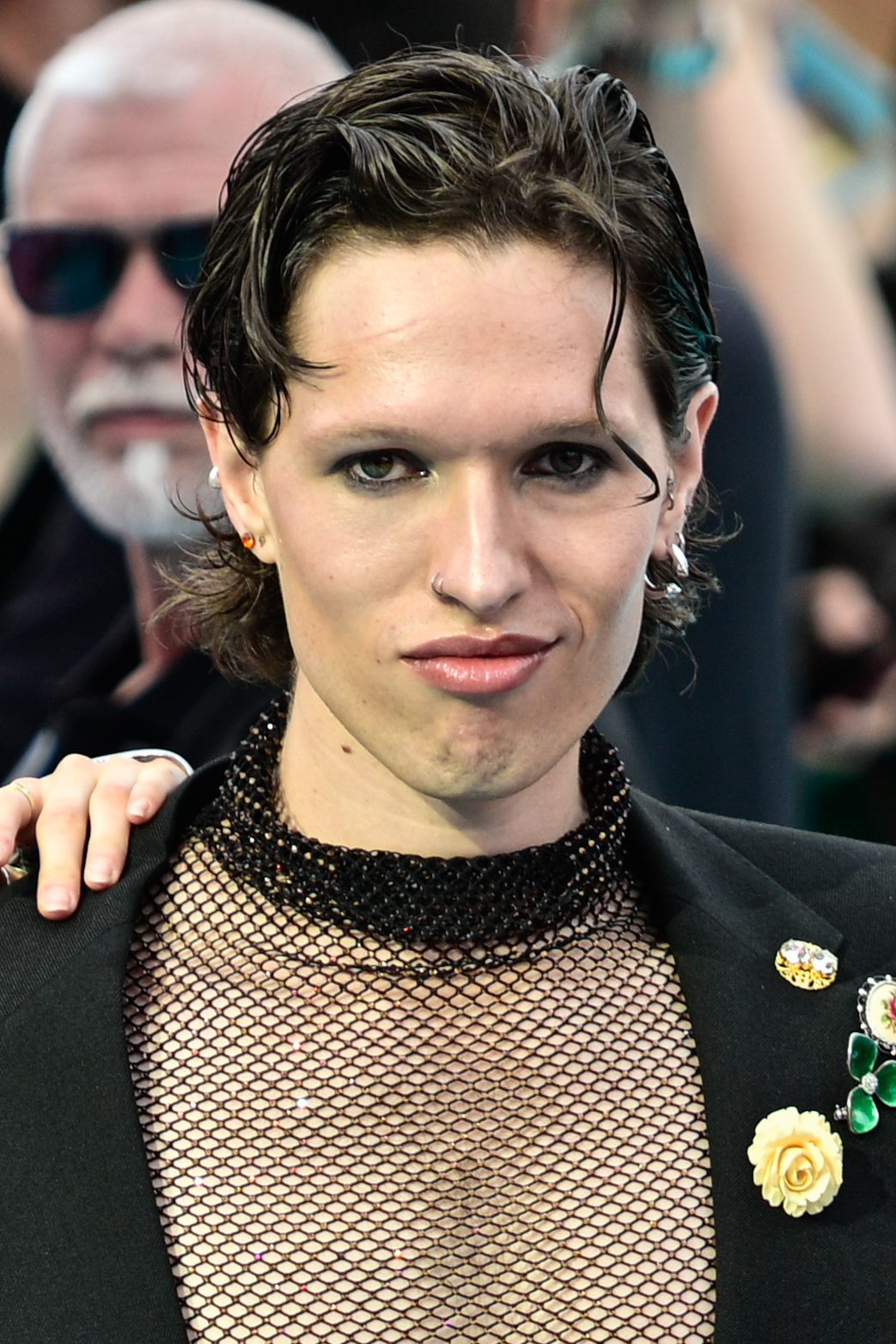
- Lund in 2026
- Born: 23 December 1998 (age 27); Gudme, Denmark
- Education: Danish National School of Performing Arts: BA, Musical Theatre
- Occupations: Singer; songwriter; actor; dancer
- Years active: 2010–present
- Musical career
- Genres: Pop; indie pop; electropop
- Instruments: Vocals
- Labels: Better Now; Little Yellow House

Søren Torpegaard Lund (pronounced [ˈsøːɐ̯n̩ ˈtʰɒːpəˌɡ̊ɒːˀ lɔnˀ]; born 23 December 1998) is a Danish singer, songwriter, actor and dancer. He represented Denmark in the Eurovision Song Contest 2026 with the song "Før vi går hjem".

== Early life and education ==
Søren Torpegaard Lund was born on 23 December 1998 in Gudme on the island of Funen.

Lund began performing in school plays in elementary school, and in his 10th year of high school he went to a music and theatre boarding school where he received training in theatre, dance, and music as well as boarding there for one year and he has commented that "I had done a lot of theater before [boarding school]... but all the technique behind it was completely new to me. But it was also the first time I felt that I actually had a talent that could perhaps turn into something bigger."

From 2016 to 2019, Lund studied musical theatre at the Danish National School of Performing Arts (Den Danske Scenekunstskole), where—at the age of 17—he became the youngest ever student in the Musical Academy (Musicalakademiet) in Fredericia.

== Musical career ==
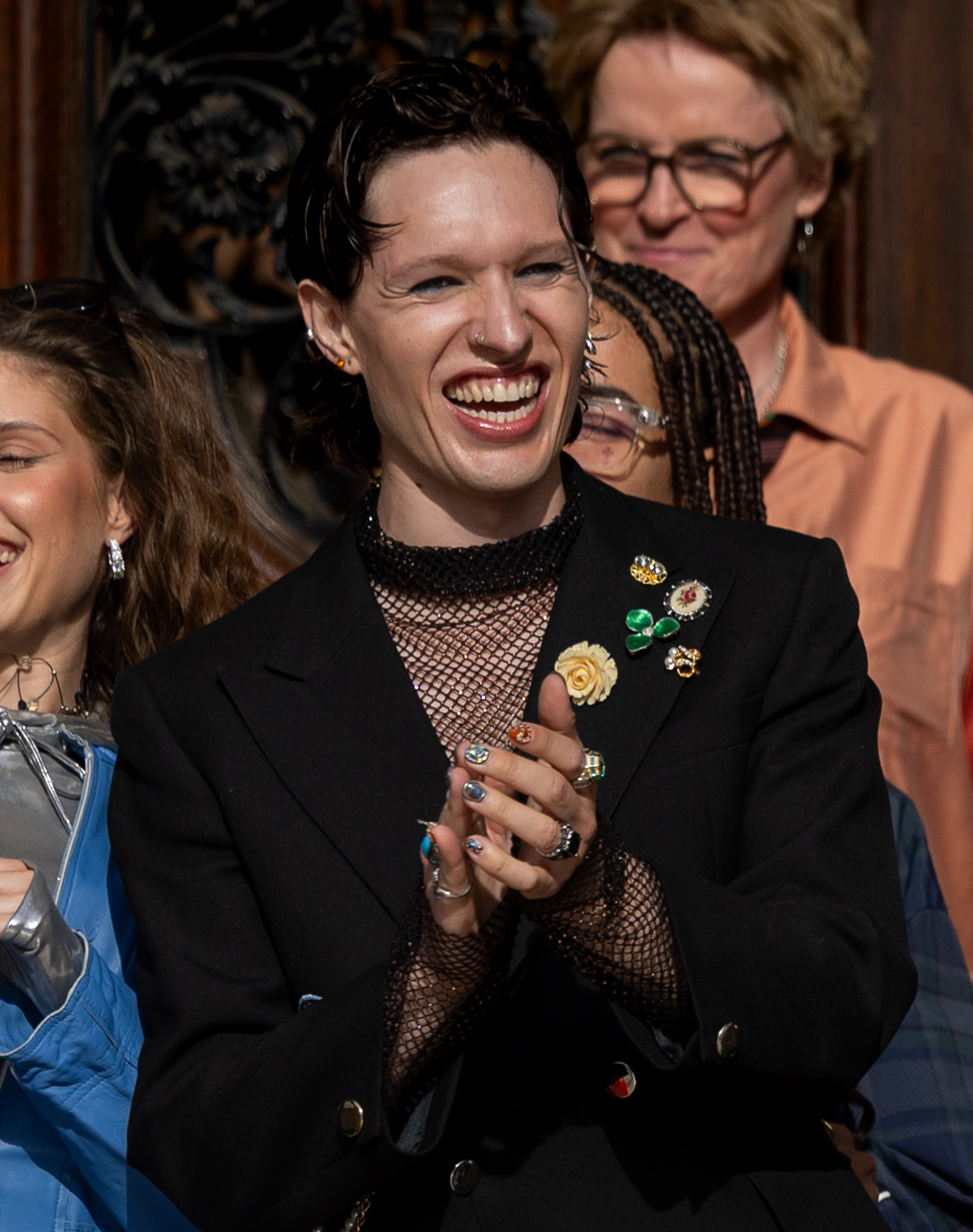
Lund on the Turquoise Carpet of Eurovision 2026

Lund began working as a musical performer, taking on roles in local productions of musicals such as West Side Story, Dance of the Vampires, and Kinky Boots. He played the lead role of Tony in West Side Story at the Copenhagen Opera House in 2021 and 2022. He received a talent award at the Reumert, a Danish theatre prize, in 2021. In 2026, it was announced that Lund would play Orpheus in a Danish production of the musical Hadestown starting in 2027.

In 2023, Lund participated in the Dansk Melodi Grand Prix 2023, the Danish national selection for the Eurovision Song Contest 2023. There, his song "Lige her" failed to qualify for the superfinal. In the same year, he released his first self-penned single, "Stor kunst". In October 2024, he released his debut EP, Øjesten. In February 2026, he won the Dansk Melodi Grand Prix 2026 with the song "Før vi går hjem". Lund thus earned the right to represent Denmark at the Eurovision Song Contest 2026. After qualifying for the final, he placed 7th with 243 points, achieving Denmarks best placement in the competition since 2013. He and his team received the 2026 Marcel Bezençon Award for composition. In July 2026, he released "Festen stopper aldrig" following his participation in the Eurovision Song Contest.

== Musical style ==
Lund cities Celine Dion, Conchita Wurst and Troye Sivan as his main inspiration.

== Personal life ==
Lund is openly queer. As of May 2026, he has been in a relationship with his boyfriend for almost 9 years and been engaged to him for the past 3 years. They met when they were both studying the same musical theatre programme at the Danish National School of Performing Arts.

== Discography ==
=== Extended plays ===
List of extended plays
Title	EP details
Øjesten	Released: 25 October 2024; Label: Better Now, Little Yellow House; Format: Digital download, streaming
Poppelvej	Released: 6 November 2026; Label: Better Now, Little Yellow House; Format: Digital download, streaming

=== Singles ===
Title	Year	Peak chart positions								Album or EP
Title	Year	DEN	DEN Air.	AUT	FIN	GRE Int.	LTU	NOR	SWE	Album or EP
"Lige her"	2023	—	—	—	—	—	—	—	—	Non-album singles
"In a Perfect World"	2023	—	—	—	—	—	—	—	—	Non-album singles
"Stor kunst"	2023	—	—	—	—	—	—	—	—	Non-album singles
"De ting jeg hvisker"	2024	—	—	—	—	—	—	—	—	Øjesten
"En dreng som mig"	2024	—	—	—	—	—	—	—	—	Øjesten
"Før vi går hjem"	2026	2	1	25	18	35	16	41	10	Poppelvej
"Festen Stopper Aldrig"	2026	—	11	—	—	—	—	—	—	Poppelvej
"—" denotes a recording that did not chart or was not released in that territory.

Awards and achievements
Preceded by Sissal with "Hallucination"	Denmark in the Eurovision Song Contest; 2026	Succeeded by TBA
