= Før vi går hjem =

2026 song by Søren Torpegaard Lund

Single by Søren Torpegaard Lund
- Released: 22 January 2026
- Length: 2:54
- Label: Little Yellow House
- Songwriters: Clara Sofie Fabricius; Søren Torpegaard Lund; Thomas Meilstrup; Valdemar Littauer Bendixen
- Producer: Valdemar Littauer Bendixen

Søren Torpegaard Lund singles chronology
| "En dreng som mig" (2024) | "Før vi går hjem" (2026) | "Festen stopper Aldrig" (2026) |

Audio video
- "Før vi går hjem" on YouTube

Eurovision Song Contest 2026 entry
- Country: Denmark
- Artist: Søren Torpegaard Lund
- Language: Danish

Finals performance
- Semi-final result: 5th
- Semi-final points: 199
- Final result: 7th
- Final points: 243

Entry chronology
- ◄ "Hallucination" (2025)

Official performance video
- "Før vi går hjem" (second semi-final) on YouTube "Før vi går hjem" (grand final) on YouTube

"Før vi går hjem" (Danish pronunciation: [ˈfœɐ̯ˀ vi kɒˀ ˈjɛmˀ]; transl. "Before We Go Home") is a song by Danish actor and singer and songwriter Søren Torpegaard Lund. It was released on 22 January 2026 through Little Yellow House, and written by Lund, alongside Clara Sofie Fabricius, Thomas Meilstrup, and Valdemar Littauer Bendixen. It represented Denmark in the Eurovision Song Contest 2026, and finished in seventh place at the final. The single reached number two on the Danish Singles Chart and the top ten in Sweden.

== Background ==
"Før vi går hjem" was composed and written by Lund together with Clara Sofie Fabricius, Thomas Meilstrup, and Valdemar Littauer Bendixen, with Bendixen also producing it.

== Eurovision Song Contest 2026 ==
=== Dansk Melodi Grand Prix 2026 ===
Dansk Melodi Grand Prix 2026 was the 56th edition of Dansk Melodi Grand Prix, the music competition that selects Denmark's entries for the Eurovision Song Contest. The event was held on 14 February 2026 at the Arena Nord in Frederikshavn and broadcast on DR1 as well as streamed online at DRTV. Eight songs competed in one show where the winner was determined over two rounds of voting. In the first round, the top three songs based on the combination of votes from a public vote and a 20-member jury panel qualified to the superfinal. In the superfinal, the winner was determined again by the votes of the jury and public. The jury panel was composed of 10 international members and 10 Danish members, while viewers were able to vote via SMS or a mobile application specifically designed for the competition. Viewers using the app were provided with three free votes for each song per round.

DR held a press meet and greet at the Koncerthuset in Copenhagen on 22 January 2026, where Lund was officially announced as one of the eight finalists in the competition with the song "Før vi går hjem", having previously competed in 2023. In the final, he advanced to the superfinal, where he was selected as the winner by the public and jury vote.

=== At Eurovision ===
The Eurovision Song Contest 2026 took place at Wiener Stadthalle in Vienna, Austria, and consisted of two semi-finals held on the respective dates of 12 and 14 May and the final on 16 May 2026. During the allocation draw conducted on 12 January 2026, Denmark was assigned to compete in the second semi-final, performing in the latter half of the show.

== Charts ==
Chart performance for "Før vi går hjem"
| Chart (2026) | Peak position |
|---|---|
| Austria (Ö3 Austria Top 40) | 25 |
| Denmark (Tracklisten) | 2 |
| Denmark Airplay (Tracklisten) | 1 |
| Finland (Suomen virallinen lista) | 18 |
| Greece International (IFPI) | 35 |
| Lithuania (AGATA) | 16 |
| Norway (IFPI Norge) | 41 |
| Sweden (Sverigetopplistan) | 10 |
