= Ericka Jane =

Danish singer (born 1995)

- Born: Ericka Jane Pedersen; June 2, 1995 (age 31); Manila, Philippines
- Origin: Denmark, Philippines
- Genres: pop, R&B
- Occupation: Singer
- Instrument: Vocals
- Years active: 2011–present

Ericka Jane Pedersen (born 20 July 1995), known professionally as Ericka Jane, is a Danish-Filipino singer.

== Career ==
At fourteen years old, Pedersen won a local Melodi Grand Prix-style competition in Køge.

In 2011, Pedersen auditioned for X-Factor. Following her X-Factor audition, she signed with a label via a YouTube cover of "Marvin's Room" by Drake.

She released her debut EP Favourite Lie in 2015. In March 2015, she performed at the SPOT Festival. The following year, she released her single "Bad Like You".

She performed at a Distortion street party-style concert and in 2018, Pedersen performed at the Grøn Koncert.

In 2020, she released her EP Hard to Fake It and her single "Strangers in the Night".

In 2021, she performed in the Danish version of Dancing with the Stars. In the same year, she was nominated twice for the Danish Music Awards, "New Name of the Year" and "Radio Hit of the Year" for her single "I Say Stupid Things".

In 2022, she performed at GivOrdLyd!, a concert to support the wellbeing of young people living in Denmark. In the same year, she was nominated for "New Name of the Year" at the Zulu Awards.

In 2023, she collaborated with Dopha and Bbybites on the track "Come Sit With Us".

She released her debut album <3DISC in 2025.

Pedersen participated in Dansk Melodi Grand Prix 2026 with her single "Death of Me", where she placed second in the final. In the summer of 2026, she performed at the SPOT Festival. She released a tribute to her mother, titled "Sidestik". In August of that year, she performed at Syd for Solen and at Folkey Festival.

== Musical style ==
Her music has been described as R&B with Caribbean rhythms.

== Discography ==
=== Albums ===
- <3DISC (2025)

=== EPs ===
- Favourite Lie (2015)
- Hard to Fake it (2020)

=== Singles ===
- "Bad Like You" (2016)
- "Strangers in the Night" (2020)
- "Death of Me" (2026)
- "Sidestik" (2026)
