= Pil (singer) =

Danish singer and songwriter (born 1990)

- Born: Pil Kalinka Nygaard Jeppesen; 17 April 1990 (age 36); Farum, Denmark
- Genres: Indie; pop
- Occupations: Singer; songwriter
- Years active: 2018–present
- Label: No3

Pil Kalinka Nygaard Jeppesen (born 17 April 1990), known mononymously as Pil, is a Danish singer and songwriter.

== Early life ==
Pil was born in Farum on 17 April 1990. Growing up there, she learned to play the family piano as a child. She was taught at Furesø Music School, and throughout her youth used music as her outlet in her spare time. According to her, it was never her goal to become a professional musician. In fact, she managed to study psychology at Aarhus University for a year and a half, before she started publishing songs under her own name in 2016 – first in English, but since 2018 also in Danish.

== Musical career ==
According to the music magazine HQ Music, singer Medina played a big role for the young Pil, when she chose to follow the path of a musician anyway. According to the magazine, Medina was to become to be a great role model, which has since been confirmed by Pil. Pil's debut single "Nattely" was released on 9 March 2018, and the following year, on 18 October, she released the critically acclaimed EP, Når du går herfra. Pil released her debut album, Kom vi flyver, siger du on 13 May 2022. The single "Dronning af månen" was her most played number on DR up to 2023.

Pil co-wrote the Saba song "Sand".

== Awards and nominations ==
In 2021, Pil won the talent project, Karrierekanonen, at Danmarks Radio, with which a talent development course followed. In October 2023, Pil was also awarded DR's "P3 Talent Award" and a prize of DKK 100,000.

== Discography ==
=== Studio albums ===
Title	Details	Peak chart positions	Certifications
Title	Details	DEN	Certifications
Kom vi flyver, siger du	Released: 13 May 2022; Label: No3; Format: LP, digital	—	
Hvis du tør at drømme	Released: 9 February 2024; Label: No3; Format: LP, digital	7	IFPI DEN: Gold
Ikk gi dig selv væk før du føler dig hjemme	Released: 5 June 2026; Label: No3	17	
"—" denotes a recording that did not chart.

=== Extended plays ===
Title	Details	Certifications
Når du går herfra	Released: 18 October 2019; Label: The Arrangement; Format: EP, digital	IFPI DEN: Platinum
Sangene fra toppen af poppen	Released: 14 May 2026; Label: No3; Format: Digital	

=== Singles ===
Title	Year	Peak chart positions	Certifications	Album
Title	Year	DEN	Certifications	Album
"Nattely"	2018	—	IFPI DEN: 3× Platinum	Non-album singles
"Gulvet"	2020	—		Non-album singles
"Omvendt" (with Andreas Odbjerg)	2021	—	IFPI DEN: 2× Platinum	Non-album singles
"Inde i mig"	2021	—		Kom vi flyver, siger du
"Gulvet 2022" (with Burhan G)	2022	—		Kom vi flyver, siger du
"Ingenting jeg hellere vil / Hjem igen"	2022	—		Non-album single
"Dronning af månen"	2023	—	IFPI DEN: 2× Platinum	Hvis du tør at drømme
"Dér" (featuring Wads)	2023	—		Hvis du tør at drømme
"Andre venner"	2023	—	IFPI DEN: Gold	Hvis du tør at drømme
"Når jeg vågner II"	2024	—		Non-album singles
"4 Øjne"	2025	—		Non-album singles
"Pæn"	2025	—		Non-album singles
"Hørt det før" (with Anton Westerlin, Annika, Mille, and Medina)	2025	3	IFPI DEN: Platinum	Godaften
"Ringer fra mine lommer"	2025	—		Non-album singles
"Venter ikk på nogen"	2025	—		Non-album singles
"Cyklen"	2026	—		Non-album singles
"Din for evigt"	2026	33		Sangene fra toppen af poppen
"Dem vi plejede at være"	2026	—		Sangene fra toppen af poppen
"Og så åbner himlen sig (warm sand)"	2026	—		Sangene fra toppen af poppen
"Så meget at kæmpe for (Church and Law)"	2026	—		Sangene fra toppen af poppen
"Sternjeklar"	2026	—		Ikk gi dig selv væk før du føler dig hjemme
"En af dig (i nissernes tjeneste)"	2026	—		Non-album single
"—" denotes a recording that did not chart or was not released in that territory.
