= Johnny (Basim song) =

2024 song by Basim

Single by Basim
- Released: 25 January 2024
- Genre: Pop
- Length: 3:17
- Label: Harraga
- Songwriters: Anis Basim Moujahid; Frederik Nordsø; Frej Randrup Lund; Erika Charlotte Martinez Vest
- Producers: Frederik Nordsø; Frej Randrup Lund

Basim singles chronology
"Hvem er de?!" (2022)	"Johnny" (2024)

Lyric video
- "Johnny" on YouTube

"Johnny" is a song by Danish-Moroccan singer and songwriter Basim. The song was released as a single on 25 January 2024. The song competed in Dansk Melodi Grand Prix 2024.

== Background and composition ==
"Johnny" was composed and written by Basim, together with Frederik Nordsø, Frej Randrup Lund, and Erika Charlotte Martinez Vest. Nordsø and Lund also produced the track. In an interview, Basim described the song as a tribute inspired by personal encounters, which showcased his storytelling and reaffirming how important it is to cherish loved ones while they are alive.

== Dansk Melodi Grand Prix 2024 ==
On 25 January 2024, it was announced that the song will be competing in Dansk Melodi Grand Prix 2024, Denmark's national selection for the Eurovision Song Contest 2024, which marks 10 years since Basim competed and won the contest in 2014 with the song "Cliche Love Song". In the final, the song qualified to the superfinal with two other songs, and ultimately placed second overall, winning the televote and placing second with the jury vote.

== Charts ==
Chart (2024)	Peak position
Denmark Airplay (Tracklisten)	8

== Release history ==
Release dates and formats for "Johnny"
Region	Date	Format(s)	Label	Type	Ref.
Various	25 January 2024	Digital download; streaming	Harraga	Single	
