= Cry (Dotter song) =

- Single artwork. Creative- & art direction by Alexander Collin, photography by Daniel Stigefelt.

Single by Dotter
- Released: 17 February 2018
- Recorded: 2017
- Genre: Pop; indie pop
- Length: 3:00
- Label: Warner Music Sweden
- Songwriter(s): Johanna Jansson; Thomas G:son; Linnea Deb; Peter Boström

Dotter singles chronology
"Rebellion" (2017)	"Cry" (2018)	"Heatwave" (2018)

"Cry" is a song recorded by Swedish singer Dotter. The song was released as a digital download on 17 February 2018 and peaked at number 59 on the Swedish Singles Chart. It took part in Melodifestivalen 2018, and placed sixth in the third semi-final on 17 February 2018. It was written by Dotter along with Thomas G:son, Linnea Deb, and Peter Boström.

== Charts ==
Chart (2018)	Peak position
Sweden (Sverigetopplistan)	59

== Release history ==
Region	Date	Format	Label
Worldwide	17 February 2018	Digital download	Warner Music Sweden
