= Melanie Wehbe =

Swedish singer

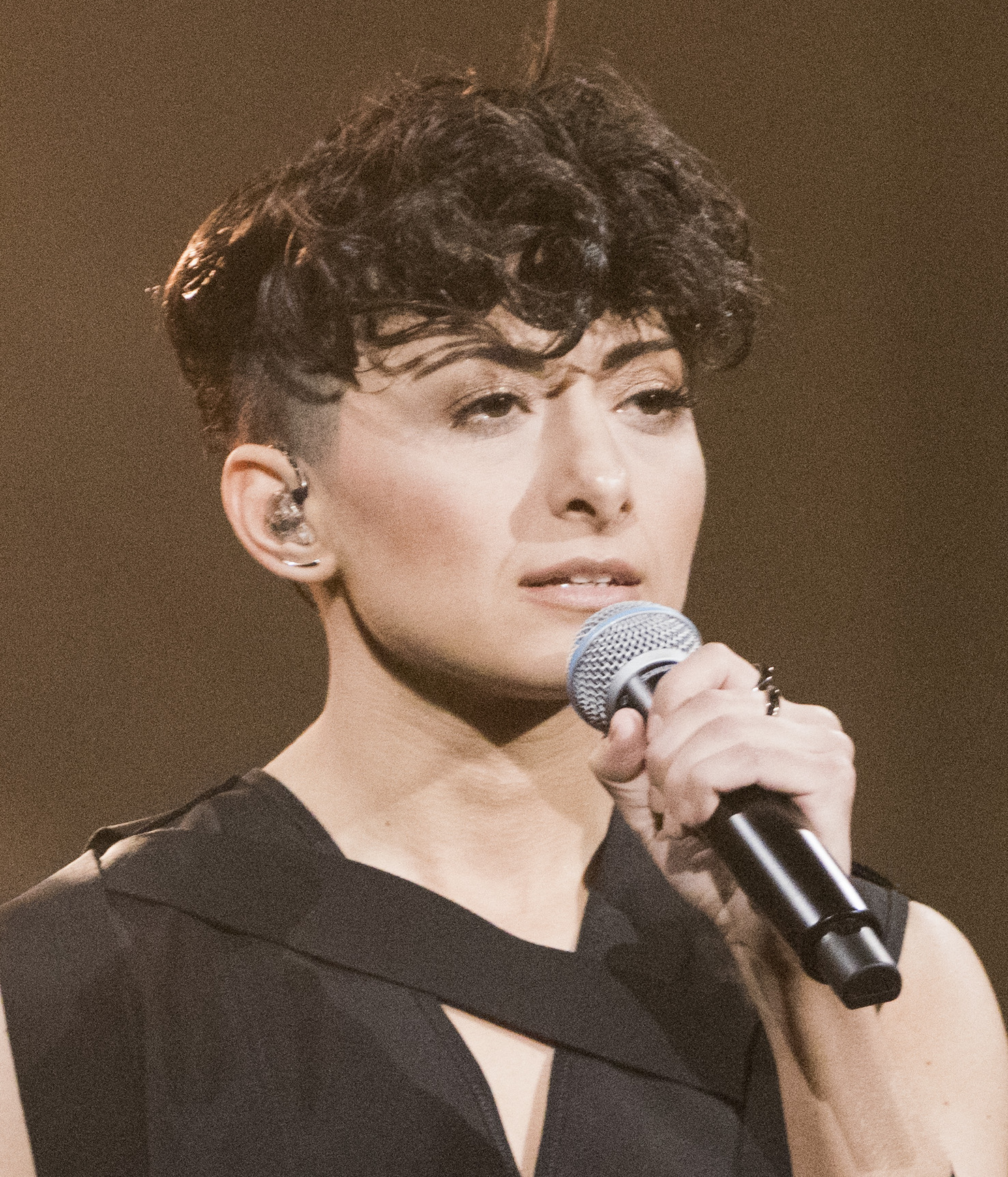
- Melanie Wehbe in 2023

Background information
- Born: Melanie Gabriella Hayrapetian; 2 December 1991 (age 34); Västerås, Sweden
- Occupations: Singer, songwriter

Melanie Gabriella Hayrapetian (born 2 December 1991), known as Melanie Wehbe, is a Swedish singer. She participated in Melodifestivalen 2023 with the song "For the Show". She has also co-written a number of songs which have gone on to compete or intended to compete in the Eurovision Song Contest, such as "Love Is Forever" by Leonora, "Move" by The Mamas, "Sand" by Saba and "Hallucination" by Sissal.

== Television ==
On 1 April 2023, Wehbe was a special guest celebrity in the episode Dragodifestivalen of the Swedish language reality television series Drag Race Sverige broadcast on SVT1 and SVT Play.

== Discography ==
=== Singles ===
- 2016 – "Wasted"
- 2018 – "Make Room"
- 2018 – "Forget You"
- 2019 – "Iron"
- 2019 – "Shy"
- 2020 – "Nothing"
- 2021 – "Sugarcoat"
- 2022 – "Like I Do"
- 2022 – "All the Rest"
- 2022 – "Bloom"
- 2023 – "Part of Me" (Lanné and Max Lean featuring Melanie Wehbe)

List of singles
Title	Year	Peak chart positions	Album
Title	Year	SWE	Album
"For the Show"	2023	87	Non-album single

=== EPs ===
- 2022 – Bloom
