= Mic Lowry =

British vocal harmony boy band

MiC LOWRY
- Origin: Liverpool, England
- Genres: Pop; R&B; soul
- Years active: 2011–present
- Label: ML
- Members: Delleile Ankrah; Kaine Ofoeme; Ben Sharples; Michael Welch
- Past members: Akia Jones
- Website: www.miclowry.com

Mic Lowry, stylised as MiC LOWRY, is a British vocal harmony boy band from Liverpool singing pop, contemporary R&B and soul music. The four-member band was formed in 2011 and is currently made up of Delleile Ankrah, Kaine Ofoeme, Ben Sharples and Michael Welch, who all attended Calderstones School in Liverpool. They were previously signed with Universal Music Group but chose to continue independently after the release of their EPs The Show (2015) and MOOD (2017).

The band's name comes from Manchester's The Lowry Centre, which was the first venue the boys performed in.

The band released their EP The Show in 2015 and their first single "Oh Lord" in 2016, with sampling and large rearrangement of parts of the Phil Collins hit "In the Air Tonight". Their follow-up single, "Whiskey Kisses", was released on 10 March 2017.

They appeared on BBC Introducing Merseyside stage and BBC Radio 1Xtra. In 2014 they won the MOBO Unsung Award, in 2015 were nominated for the BET Best International Newcomer and in 2016 won Liverpool's GIT Award. They opened for Justin Bieber in Liverpool, Glasgow, London, Birmingham, Leicester and Manchester in the European leg of his Purpose World Tour and performed in 37 European dates in 22 cities. They also performed in various UK venues including Manchester, Birmingham, Sheffield, Glasgow and London's The O2 Arena. In March 2017, they were picked by the American radio and television personality Elvis Duran as Artist of the Month and performed live on NBC's Today show broadcast nationally in addition to a number of media shows and live appearances in various US venues including New York and Los Angeles. On 7 March 2017, the group performed on The Wendy Williams Show.

On 19 October 2018, Mic Lowry released their first single as independent artists, "Tesla", a collaboration with the record producer Diztortion.

On 10 June 2019 they opened for the Backstreet Boys DNA tour at Manchester Arena. On 2 September 2022, the group released their single, "Flowers", followed by a music video which was released on 30 September 2022.

On 31 August 2024, The group auditioned in the thirteenth series of The Voice UK in the first episode. The coaches all turned and the group chose will.i.am as their coach. They were eliminated in the semi-final on 19 October, with will.i.am selecting competitor Storry to move on to the final.

== Discography ==
=== EPs ===
- 2015: The Show
- 2017: MOOD

=== Singles ===
Year	Title	Peak positions	Album
Year	Title	UK	Album
2016	"Oh Lord"	54	
2017	"Whiskey Kisses"		
2017	"Don't Tempt Me"		MOOD EP
2017	"Can't Lie"		MOOD EP
2018	"Tesla"		
2018	"Brand New"		
2021	"Scared of Love"		
2022	"Flowers"		
