= Reiley (singer) =

Faroese singer-songwriter (born 1997)

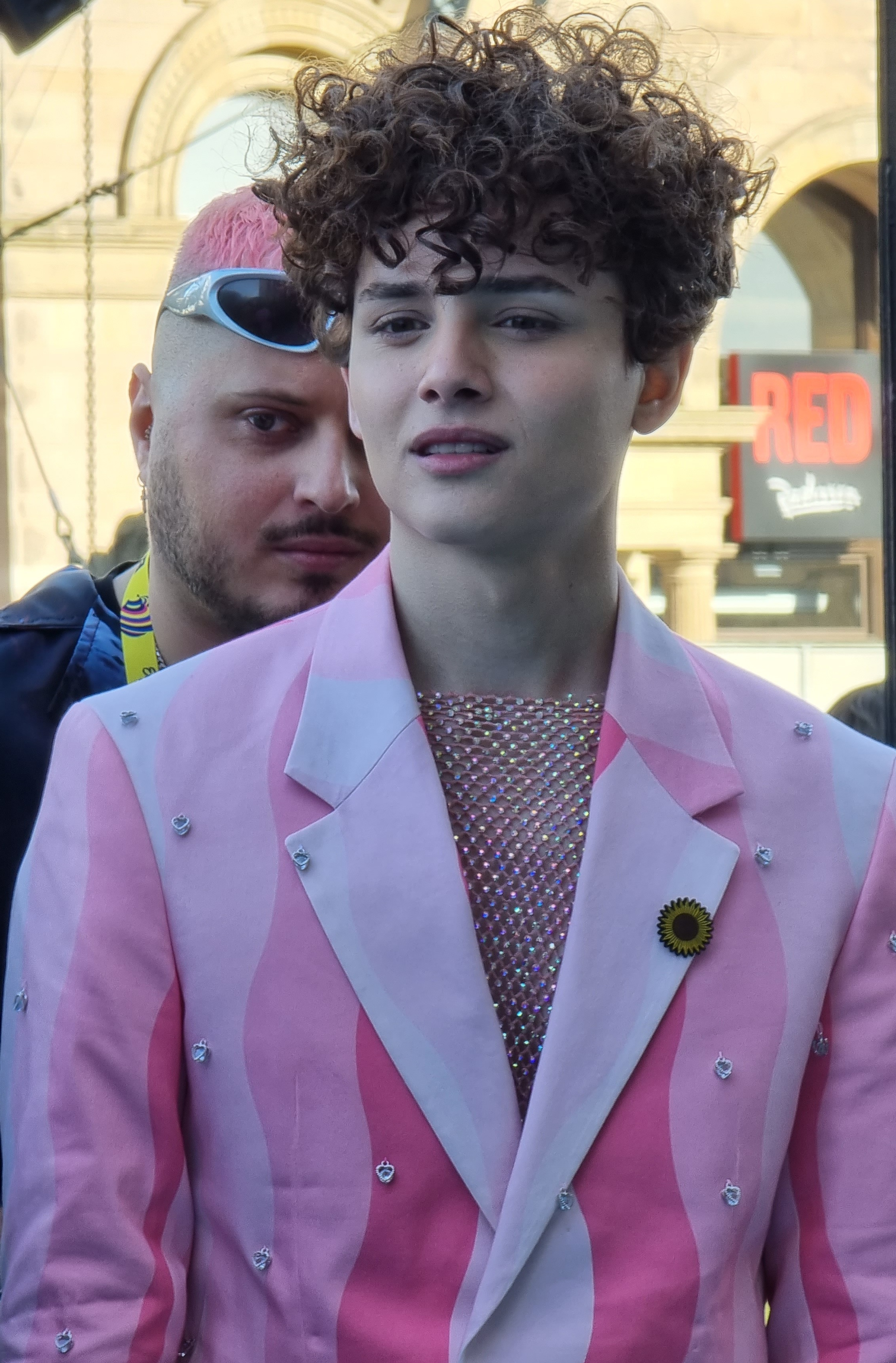
- Reiley at the Turquoise Carpet for the Eurovision Song Contest 2023

Background information
- Born: Rani Johann Petersen; 24 November 1997 (age 28); Tórshavn, Faroe Islands
- Genres: Pop, electropop
- Occupations: Singer; influencer
- Instruments: Vocals; piano
- Years active: 2019–present
- Label: Atlantic Records
- Website: www.reileyofficial.com

Rani Johann Petersen (born 24 November 1997), known professionally as Reiley, is a Faroese singer and social media influencer. He represented Denmark in the Eurovision Song Contest 2023 with the song "Breaking My Heart".

== Early and personal life ==
Petersen was born in Tórshavn, Faroe Islands in 1997. He started playing the piano aged six, but his focus moved towards gymnastics as a teenager. His musical interest returned a few years later after performing in a school production, and he began taking singing lessons.

Petersen lives in London. As of February 2023, he was temporarily residing in Copenhagen.

Petersen has 10.4 million followers on TikTok.

== Career ==
=== 2023: Melodi Grand Prix and Eurovision ===
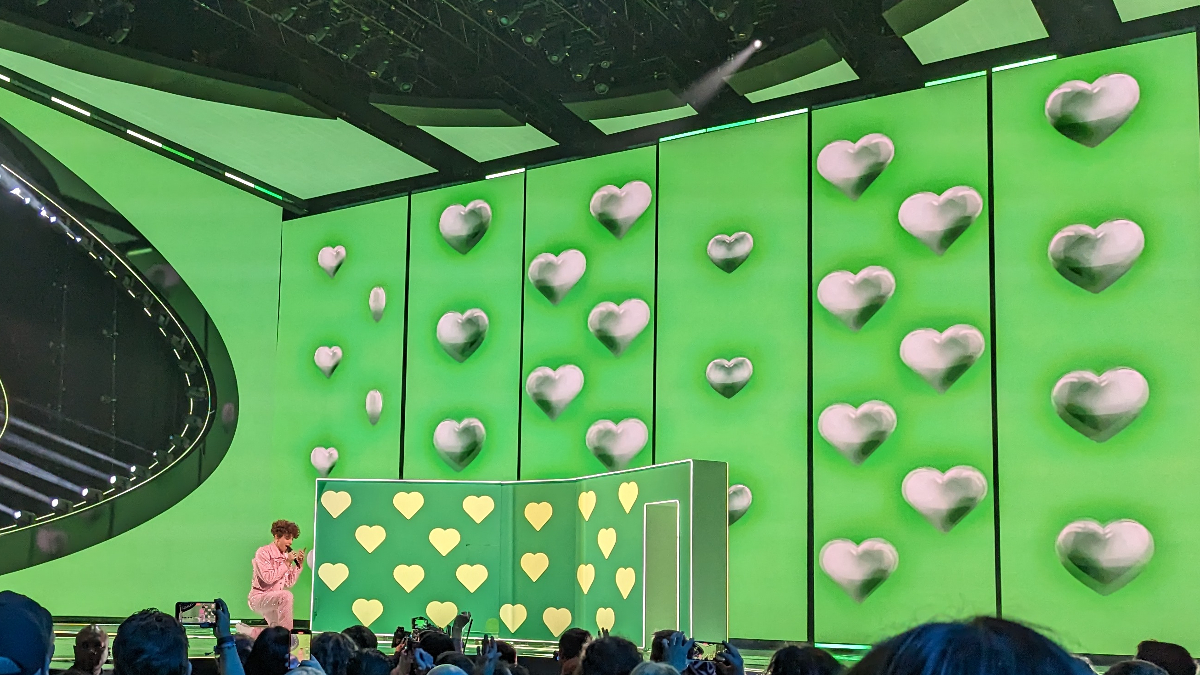
Reiley performing in the Eurovision Song Contest 2023.

Reiley was announced as one of the competitors of the Melodi Grand Prix 2023, the Danish national selection for the Eurovision Song Contest 2023, with the song "Breaking My Heart". However, he was at risk of disqualification from the competition after it was discovered that he performed the song at the "Slow Life Slow Live" festival in Seoul, South Korea in 2022, a violation of the competition's rules. Despite this, it was later confirmed that he would not be disqualified and would compete. He later went on to win the competition, becoming the representative of Denmark, the first Faroese artist to do so. At Eurovision, he performed in the second semi-final, ultimately finishing 14th with 6 points, failing to qualify for the final.

=== 2023–present: after Eurovision ===
Shortly after Eurovision, it was announced that Reiley would perform at the 2023 edition of Bátastevnan, a music festival held in Vestmanna, Faroe Islands, on 19 May 2023. On 25 May, Reiley released a new single, titled "Lovesongs". Reiley performed at the 2023 edition of Voxbotn, a music festival held on 23-24 May 2023 in Tórshavn.

== Discography ==
=== EP ===
- BRB, Having an Identity Crisis (2021)

=== Singles ===
Title	Year	Peak chart positions			Album
Title	Year	DEN	EST Air.	LTU Air.	Album
"Let It Ring"	2021	—	*		Non-album single
"Superman"	2021	—	*		BRB, Having an Identity Crisis
"YOU"	2021	—	*		BRB, Having an Identity Crisis
"Strange Love"	2021	—	*		BRB, Having an Identity Crisis
"Blah Blah Blah"	2022	—	*		Non-album singles
"Moonlight" (with AB6IX)	2022	—	*		Non-album singles
"Breaking My Heart"	2023	31	—	—	Non-album singles
"Lovesongs"	2023	—	81	91	Non-album singles
"Feeling"	2026	—	—	—	Non-album singles
"Funny I Don’t Miss You"	2026	—	—	—	Non-album singles
"Freak Show"	2026	—	—	—	Non-album singles
"—" denotes a single that did not chart or was not released. "*" denotes that the chart did not exist at that time.

Awards and achievements
Preceded by Reddi with "The Show"	Denmark in the Eurovision Song Contest; 2023	Succeeded by Saba with "Sand"
