= Saba (singer) =

Danish singer (born 1997)

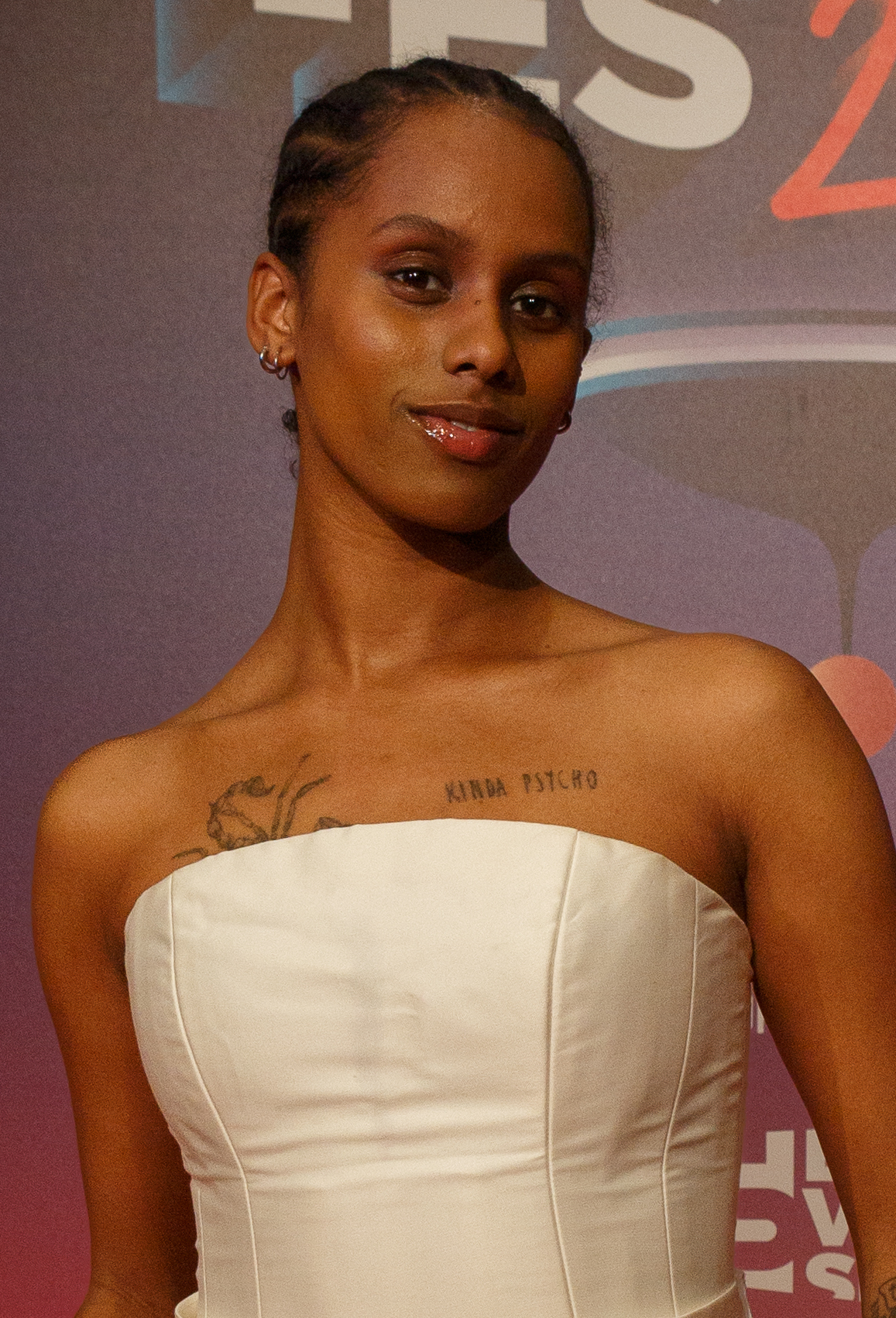
- Saba in 2024

Background information
- Also known as: Anna Saba Lykke Oehlenschlæger
- Born: 11 August 1997 (age 28); Addis Ababa, Ethiopia
- Origin: Ringkøbing, Denmark
- Occupations: Singer; actress; model

Anna Saba Lykke Oehlenschlæger (Danish pronunciation: [ˈænæ ˈsɛːpæ ˈløkə ˈøˀənˌslɛːjɐ, - ˈsɑpæ -]; born 11 August 1997), known simply by her birth name Saba (stylised in all caps), is an Ethiopian-Danish singer, musical theatre actress and model. She represented Denmark in the Eurovision Song Contest 2024 with the song "Sand".

== Early life ==
Anna Saba Lykke Oehlenschlæger and her twin sister Andrea Lykke Oehlenschlæger were born on 11 August 1997 in Addis Ababa, Ethiopia. They were adopted at eight months old and were raised in Ringkøbing, Denmark, since 10 April 1998. During her youth, Oehlenschlæger played football at DBU Jutland.

== Career ==
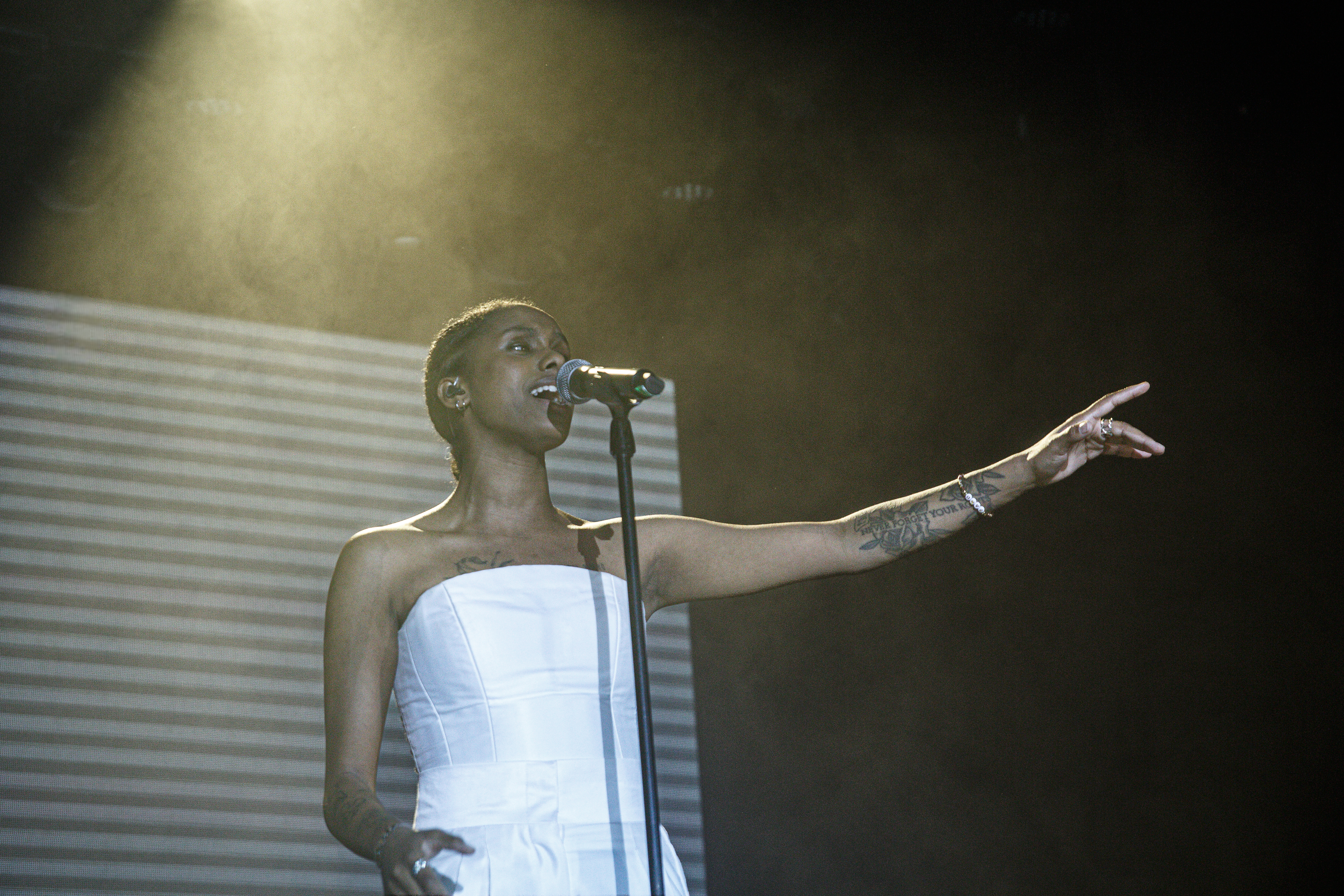
Saba performing in Madrid during PrePartyES 2024

After dropping out of high school, Oehlenschlæger and her sister moved to Copenhagen, starting off as a model and entrepreneur in teeth whitening products, while her sister pursued a singing and musical acting career. On 23 February 2023, Oehlenschlæger replaced her pregnant sister in the role of Dionne for the premiere of the musical Hair at the Østre Gasværk Teater, making her debut as a non-stunt stage actress.

On 25 January 2024, Saba was announced as one of the participants of Dansk Melodi Grand Prix 2024, the Danish national final for the Eurovision Song Contest 2024, with the song "Sand". She went on to win the final on 17 February 2024, earning the right to represent Denmark in the upcoming contest. On 29 March 2024, several entrants, including Saba, released a joint statement calling for "an immediate and lasting ceasefire" in Gaza, as well as "the safe return of all hostages". Saba failed to qualify from the second semi-final on 9 May 2024, placing 12th out of 16 with 36 points.

== Personal life ==
In 2018, Oehlenschlæger was diagnosed with bipolar I disorder and was hospitalised several times until 2020, as she explained in the 2020 DR documentary Min sindssyge tvilling (transl. 'My insane twin'). She also practiced self-harm during her teenage years. She is an ambassador for the Danish Depression Association.

Oehlenschlæger was in a relationship with Lærke-Maria Schmidt, from 2020 until latest 2023. At the Danish Melodi Grand Prix 2024, she revealed she had been in a relationship with Aviaja Larsen for 6 months.

== Discography ==
=== Singles ===
Title	Year	Peak chart positions		Album or EP
Title	Year	DEN	LTU	Album or EP
"Sand"	2024	36	77	Non-album single

Awards and achievements
Preceded by Reiley with "Breaking My Heart"	Denmark in the Eurovision Song Contest; 2024	Succeeded by Sissal with "Hallucination"
