= Breaking My Heart (Reiley song) =

2023 song by Reiley

Single by Reiley
- Language: English
- Released: 19 January 2023
- Genre: Electropop
- Length: 2:43
- Label: Atlantic
- Songwriters: Bård Mathias Bonsaksen; Hilda Stenmalm; Rani Petersen; Sivert Hjeltnes Hagtvet

Reiley singles chronology
"Moonlight" (2022)	"Breaking My Heart" (2023)	"Lovesongs" (2023)

Music video
- "Breaking My Heart" on YouTube

Eurovision Song Contest 2023 entry
- Country: Denmark
- Artist: Reiley
- Language: English
- Composers: Bård Mathias Bonsaksen; Hilda Stenmalm; Rani Petersen; Sivert Hjeltnes Hagtvet
- Lyricists: Bård Mathias Bonsaksen; Hilda Stenmalm; Rani Petersen; Sivert Hjeltnes Hagtvet

Finals performance
- Semi-final result: 14th
- Semi-final points: 6

Entry chronology
- ◄ "The Show" (2022)
- "Sand" (2024) ►

Official performance video
- "Breaking My Heart" (Second Semi-Final) on YouTube

"Breaking My Heart" is a song by Faroese singer and social media influencer Reiley, released on 19 January 2023. The song represented Denmark in the Eurovision Song Contest 2023 after winning Dansk Melodi Grand Prix 2023, the Danish national selection for that year's Eurovision Song Contest.

== Background ==
The song was written and composed by Reiley with the Norwegians Bård Mathias Bonsaksen and Sivert Hjeltnes Hagtvet, and the Swede Hilda Stenmalm.

Reiley, discussing the song in an interview with a Eurovision YouTube fan channel, Eurovision Fantasia, said it was written during a "toxic" relationship. He also claimed that he had put the song in a folder, and decided to record it when he heard of Dansk Melodi Grand Prix 2023.

== Eurovision Song Contest ==
=== Dansk Melodi Grand Prix 2023 ===
Dansk Melodi Grand Prix 2023 was the 53rd edition of Dansk Melodi Grand Prix, the music competition that selects Denmark's entries for the Eurovision Song Contest. The event was held on 11 February 2023.

The final took place over two rounds of voting. In the first round of voting, the top three will advance to the superfinal based on the votes of a public vote. In the second round, the top three entries will perform again and the winner will be determined by a 50/50 combination of jury and public vote. Heading into the final, "Breaking My Heart" was considered one of the favorites to win the competition, coming in second on a poll from Eurovision fan-site Wiwibloggs. At the end of the superfinal voting, it was revealed that "Breaking My Heart" had won the superfinal, earning 28% of the vote from juries and 15% of the vote from the Danish public for a combined percentage of 43%, winning by a margin of 11%, thus earning the Danish spot for the Eurovision Song Contest 2023.

=== At Eurovision ===
According to Eurovision rules, all nations with the exceptions of the host country and the "Big Five" (France, Germany, Italy, Spain and the United Kingdom) are required to qualify from one of two semi-finals in order to compete for the final; the top ten countries from each semi-final progress to the final. The European Broadcasting Union (EBU) split up the competing countries into six different pots based on voting patterns from previous contests, with countries with favourable voting histories put into the same pot. On 31 January 2023, an allocation draw was held which placed each country into one of the two semi-finals, as well as which half of the show they would perform in. Denmark was placed into the second semi-final, to be held on 11 May 2023, and was scheduled to perform in the first half of the show. Denmark received just 6 points, all from Iceland, from the public so did not proceed to the Grand Final, their worst result to date in the contest, in a semi final.

== Charts ==
Chart performance for "Breaking My Heart"
Chart (2023)	Peak position
Denmark (Tracklisten)	31
