= Clara Sofie =

Danish singer

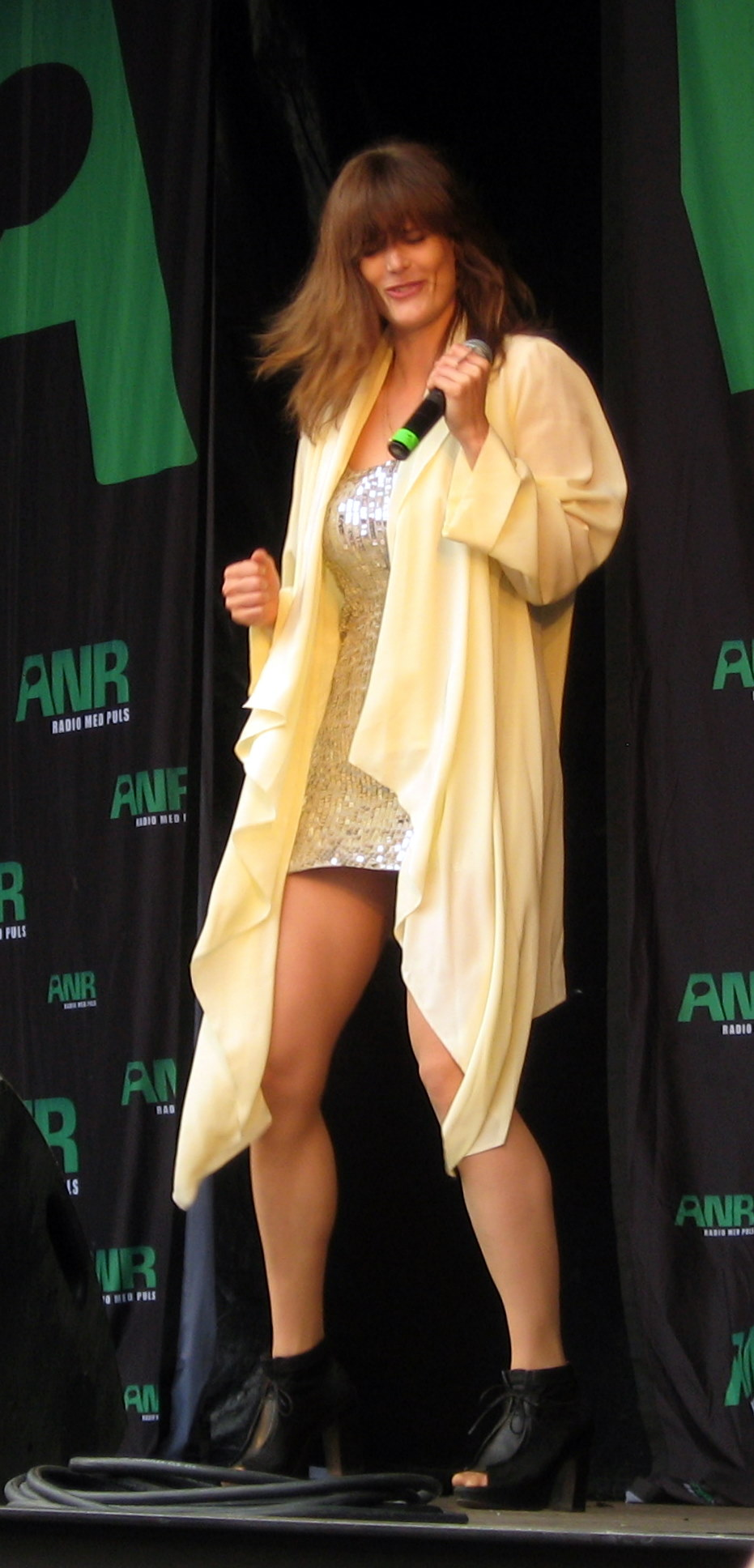
- Clara Sofie in Hjørring, 2011

Background information
- Born: Clara Sofie Fabricius Rosenhoff; 16 March 1981 (age 45); Gentofte, Denmark
- Genres: pop, electro-pop
- Occupations: Singer, songwriter
- Years active: 2010–present
- Label: Sony Music

Clara Sofie Fabricius Rosenhoff (born 16 March 1981) is a Danish singer and songwriter.

Clara Sofie studied at University of Copenhagen graduating with an MSc. degree in Modern Culture and then moved to live in London and New York to break through as a singer and songwriter. She also sang in church choirs Her breakthrough came in June 2010 with her cooperation with house-DJ Rune RK. Their joint single "Når tiden går baglæns" (meaning When time goes backwards) topped the Tracklisten, the Danish Singles Chart for five consecutive weeks, followed by another joint single in 2011 "Lever for en anden" reaching No. 24. The joint album Byen elsker dig (meaning the city loves you) making it to No. 13 in the Danish Albums Chart.

The Danish singer-songwriter and record producer Oh Land (real name Nanna Øland Fabricius) is Clara Sofie's cousin.

== Discography ==
=== Albums ===
Year	Title	Highest position	Certification
Year	Title	DEN	Certification
2008	Jeg er din	—	
2011	Byen elsker dig (with Rune RK)	13	
2014	Gennem himlen	?	

Year	Single	Peak chart positions	Certifications	Album
Year	Single	DEN	Certifications	Album
2010	"Når tiden går baglæns" (with Rune RK)	1		Byen elsker dig
2011	"Lever for en anden" (with Rune RK)	24		Byen elsker dig
