= Sand (Saba song) =

2024 song by Saba

Single by Saba
- Released: 25 January 2024
- Genre: Pop; synthpop
- Length: 3:01
- Label: Warner
- Songwriter(s): Jonas Thander; Melanie Wehbe; Pil Kalinka Nygaard Jeppesen
- Producer(s): Jonas Thander

Music video
- "Sand" on YouTube

Eurovision Song Contest 2024 entry
- Country: Denmark
- Artist(s): Saba
- Language: English
- Composer(s): Jonas Thander; Melanie Wehbe; Pil Kalinka Nygaard Jeppesen
- Lyricist(s): Jonas Thander; Melanie Wehbe; Pil Kalinka Nygaard Jeppesen

Finals performance
- Semi-final result: 12th
- Semi-final points: 36

Entry chronology
- ◄ "Breaking My Heart" (2023)
- "Hallucination" (2025) ►

Official performance video
- "Sand" (Second Semi-Final) on YouTube

"Sand" is a song by Danish singer and actress Saba, released on 25 January 2024 by Warner Music Denmark. Self-described as a song about the feeling of losing control, it was written by Jonas Thander, Melanie Wehbe, and Pil Kalinka Nygaard Jeppesen. The song represented Denmark in the Eurovision Song Contest 2024.

== Background and composition ==
"Sand" was written and composed by Jonas Thander, Melanie Wehbe, and Pil Kalinka Nygaard Jeppesen. In interviews, Saba stated the song is a way of means of expressing the feeling of losing control, using the metaphor of sand slipping and falling through one's hands as a metaphor for the song.

According to Saba, she entered Dansk Melodi Grand Prix 2024 with the song after seeing Swedish artist Loreen win the Eurovision Song Contest 2023. She was officially announced as a participant in the contest on 25 January 2024.

"Sand" was one of the possible songs for Malta's Emma Muscat but who rejected this song in favor of I Am What I Am.

== Promotion ==
After her victory in Dansk Melodi Grand Prix 2024, Saba performed "Sand" on various occasions in the months leading up to the Eurovision Song Contest 2024. She announced her intents to first perform the song live at Melfest WKND 2024 on 7 March after the completion of Melodifestivalen 2024. She also announced her participation in various Eurovision pre-parties throughout the months of March and April, including Pre-Party ES 2024 on 30 March, the Barcelona Eurovision Party 2024 on 6 April, the London Eurovision Party 2024 on 7 April, and Eurovision in Concert 2024 on 13 April.

== Eurovision Song Contest ==
=== Dansk Melodi Grand Prix 2024 ===
Denmark's broadcaster DR organized an eight-entry competition, Dansk Melodi Grand Prix 2024, to select its entrant for the Eurovision Song Contest 2024. The contest consisted of a singular grand final with the winner being selected over two round of voting; in the first round, three entries out of the eight would advance to a superfinal. In the superfinal, the winner was chosen by a 50/50 combination of televote and juries.

Saba was officially announced as a participant on 25 January 2024. The song was drawn to perform first in the contest, and qualified for the superfinal. When the results were announced for the superfinal, the song was announced to have won the competition, earning a combined total of 37 points, three more than Basim's "Johnny", the runner-up. As a result, the song won rights to represent Denmark in the Eurovision Song Contest 2024.

=== At Eurovision ===
The Eurovision Song Contest 2024 took place at the Malmö Arena in Malmö, Sweden, and consisted of two semi-finals held on the respective dates of 7 and 9 May and the final on 11 May 2024. During the allocation draw on 30 January 2024, Denmark was drawn to compete in the second semi-final, performing in the first half of the show. Saba was later drawn to perform seventh in the semi-final, after Austria's Kaleen and before Armenia's Ladaniva.

The Eurovision performance featured Saba in a white pantsuit, with the outfit containing actual sand within its pocket. The performance was remarked as a similar, larger scale performance than the version she performed at Dansk Melodi Grand Prix 2024.

== Charts ==
Chart performance for "Sand"
Chart (2024)	Peak position
Denmark (Tracklisten)	36
Lithuania (AGATA)	77

== Release history ==
Release history and formats for "Sand"
Country	Date	Format(s)	Label	Ref.
Various	25 January 2024	Digital download	Warner Music Denmark	
