= Hallucination (Sissal song) =

2025 song by Sissal

Single by Sissal
- Released: 6 February 2025
- Genre: Dance-pop; europop
- Length: 3:03
- Label: The Arrangement; Virgin
- Songwriters: Sissal Jóhanna Norðberg Niclasen; Chris Rohde-Frisk; Line Spangsberg; Linnea Deb; Malthe Johansen; Marcus Winther-John; Melanie Gabriella Hayrapetian
- Producers: Chris Rohde-Frisk; Joy Deb; Malthe Johansen

Sissal singles chronology
| "Hear Me Now" (2024) | "Hallucination" (2025) | "I'm Not Crying, I'm Dancing" (2025) |

Live video
- "Hallucination" on YouTube

Eurovision Song Contest 2025 entry
- Country: Denmark
- Artist: Sissal
- Language: English
- Composers: Chris Rohde-Frisk; Line Spangsberg; Linnea Deb; Malthe Johansen; Marcus Winther-John; Melanie Gabriella Hayrapetian; Sissal Jóhanna Norðberg Niclasen
- Lyricists: Chris Rohde-Frisk; Line Spangsberg; Linnea Deb; Malthe Johansen; Marcus Winther-John; Melanie Gabriella Hayrapetian; Sissal Jóhanna Norðberg Niclasen

Finals performance
- Semi-final result: 8th
- Semi-final points: 61
- Final result: 23rd
- Final points: 47

Entry chronology
- ◄ "Sand" (2024)
- "Før vi går hjem" (2026) ►

Official performance video
- "Hallucination" (second semi-final) on YouTube "Hallucination" (grand final) on YouTube

"Hallucination" is a song by Faroese singer-songwriter Sissal. Described as an experience of encountering someone with a great connection, it was released on 6 February 2025 through Virgin. It was written by Sissal, alongside Chris Rohde-Frisk, Line Spangsberg, Linnea Deb, Malthe Johansen, Marcus Winther-John, and Melanie Gabriella Hayrapetian. The song represented Denmark in the Eurovision Song Contest 2025 and entered the music charts in Denmark, Lithuania, Sweden, Greece and Switzerland.

== Background and composition ==
"Hallucination" was composed and written by Sissal, together with Line Spangsberg, Linnea Deb, Marcus Winther-John, Melanie Gabriella Hayrapetian, Chris Rohde-Frisk, and Malthe Johansen, with the latter two and Joy Deb producing the song. As described by Sissal, the song is about "meeting a person where the connection feels so real that it almost seems unreal." Wiwibloggs called the dance song "EDM-inspired".

== Promotion ==
To promote "Hallucination" before the Eurovision Song Contest 2025, Sissal announced her intent to participate in various Eurovision pre-parties. She first participated at the Nordic Eurovision Party 2025 which took place on 22 March 2025 at the Sentrum Scene in Oslo. It was also announced that she will be performing at Eurovision in Concert 2025 held at AFAS Live Arena in Amsterdam on 5 April 2025. Sissal also participated at PrePartyES 2025 on 19 April 2025 held at Sala La Riviera in Madrid.

== Critical reception ==
Eva Frantz from the Finnish broadcaster Yle gave the song a 6/10, calling Sissal "confident and cool on stage". Angelica Frey from The Guardian dubbed the song as one of the 10 best Eurovision songs of 2025, calling it a "neatly packaged EDM-scandi-pop record", drawing comparisons to collaborations between Sia and David Guetta. She noted that Sissal's "Adele-lite vocals" helped it avoid predictability and characterized it as a nostalgic throwback to 2010s Eurovision entries, citing Carola’s "Invincible" and Loreen’s "Euphoria" as reference points.

Likewise, Jon O’Brien from Vulture ranked the song seventh, observing similarities to Loreen’s "Euphoria" but commented, "it's refreshing to hear a banger this year that plays it entirely straight". Rob Picheta from CNN ranked the entry ninth out of the 26 finalists, calling the song a "fabulous, epic, searing ballad". In a review for The Times, Ed Potton gave the song three out of five stars, describing it as "textbook piece of dance-pop" and "slick, melodic, and well performed".

== Eurovision Song Contest ==
=== Dansk Melodi Grand Prix 2025 ===
Dansk Melodi Grand Prix 2025 was the national final format organised by the broadcaster Danish Broadcasting Corporation (DR) to select the Danish representative for the Eurovision Song Contest 2025. For 2025, the contest saw eight entries competing in a televised final held on 1 March 2025. The winner was determined over two rounds of voting. In the first round, open between 24 and 28 February 2025 and again during the live final of 1 March, the top three songs qualified to a superfinal, where a second voting round determined the winner. The results of both rounds were based on the 50/50 combination of votes from the public and a jury panel, consisting of 10 international members and 10 Danish members.

Sissal was officially announced to compete in Dansk Melodi Grand Prix 2025 on 6 February 2025. In the final, the song moved on to the superfinal along with two other entries, namely "The Unluckiest Boy Alive" by Adel the Second and "Proud" by Tim Schou. The song eventually won the superfinal, garnering 20 points from the jury and 18 points from the televote, for a combined total of 38 points, ultimately winning the contest and the Danish spot for the Eurovision Song Contest 2025.

=== At Eurovision ===
The Eurovision Song Contest 2025 took place at St. Jakobshalle in Basel, Switzerland, and consisted of two semi-finals held on the respective dates of 13 and 15 May and the final on 17 May 2025. During the allocation draw held on 28 January 2025, Denmark was drawn to compete in the second semi-final, performing in the second half of the show. Sissal was later drawn to perform 11th, ahead of Georgia's Mariam Shengelia and before Czechia's Adonxs. Denmark qualified for the final for the first time in six years and in the 2020s, breaking a long-held non-qualification streak.

For its Eurovision performance, the staging differed from the production in Dansk Melodi Grand Prix 2025, following criticisms of the original performance, also made by Sissal herself. Erik Struve Hansen, head of Dansk Melodi Grand Prix, revealed in an interview that Sissal will be accompanied by four dancers on stage, along with a larger piece of fabric that surrounded Sissal, as well as being able to change colours and move through a wind machine, described to "mimic the feeling of a hallucination". Further, Sissal wore a black and white outfit, which later changed to a blue outfit amidst the performance.

Sissal performed a repeat of her performance in the grand final on 17 May. The song was performed 22nd, ahead of Portugal's Napa and before Sweden's KAJ.

== Credits and personnel ==
Musicians

- Sissal Jóhanna Norðberg Niclasen – vocals
- Joy Deb – programming, bass, keyboards, drums
- Malthe Johansen – programming, bass, keyboards, drums
- Christopher Rohde-Frisk – keyboards
- Linnea Deb – background vocals
- Melanie Gabriella Hayrapetian – background vocals

Technical

- Holger Lagerfeldt – mastering
- Joy Deb – mixing, production
- Christopher Rohde-Frisk – production
- Malthe Johansen – production

== Charts ==
Chart performance for "Hallucination"
| Chart (2025) | Peak position |
|---|---|
| Denmark Airplay (Tracklisten) | 8 |
| Greece International (IFPI) | 87 |
| Lithuania (AGATA) | 54 |
| Sweden Heatseeker (Sverigetopplistan) | 8 |
| Switzerland (Schweizer Hitparade) | 51 |
| UK Indie Breakers (OCC) | 10 |
| UK Singles Downloads (Official Charts) | 8 |
| UK Singles Sales (OCC) | 8 |

== Release history ==
Release dates and formats for "Hallucination"
| Region | Date | Format(s) | Version | Label | Ref. |
|---|---|---|---|---|---|
| Various | 6 February 2025 | Digital download; streaming | Original | The Arrangement; Virgin | |
