= Eurovision Song Contest 2024 =

International song competition

- United by Music

Dates and venue
- Semi-final 1: 7 May 2024
- Semi-final 2: 9 May 2024
- Final: 11 May 2024
- Venue: Malmö Arena; Malmö, Sweden

Organisation
- Organiser: European Broadcasting Union (EBU)
- Executive supervisor: Martin Österdahl

Production
- Host broadcaster: Sveriges Television (SVT)
- Directors: Robin Hofwander; Daniel Jelinek; Fredrik Bäcklund
- Executive producers: Ebba Adielsson; Christel Tholse Willers
- Presenters: Petra Mede; Malin Åkerman

Participants
- Number of entries: 37
- Number of finalists: 25 (Note: 26 countries were set to perform, but the Netherlands was disqualified from the contest between the second semi-final and the final. The country retained its right to vote in the final.)
- Returning countries: Luxembourg
- Disqualified countries: Netherlands
- Non-returning countries: Romania
- Participation map: Finalist countries Countries eliminated in the semi-finals Countries disqualified during the contest Countries that participated in the past but not in 2024

Vote
- Voting system: Each country awards one set in the semi-finals, and two sets in the final, of 12, 10, 8–1 points to ten songs. In all three shows, online votes from viewers in non-participating countries are aggregated and awarded as one set of points.
- Winning song: Switzerland "The Code"

The Eurovision Song Contest 2024 was the 68th edition of the Eurovision Song Contest. It consisted of two semi-finals on 7 and 9 May and a final on 11 May 2024, held at the Malmö Arena in Malmö, Sweden, and presented by Petra Mede and Malin Åkerman. It was organised by the European Broadcasting Union (EBU) and host broadcaster Sveriges Television (SVT), which staged the event after winning the 2023 contest for Sweden with the song "Tattoo" by Loreen. Mede had previously presented the 2013 and 2016 contests.

Broadcasters from thirty-seven countries participated in the contest, the same number as in 2023. Romania opted not to participate, and Luxembourg competed for the first time since 1993. The Netherlands was disqualified from the contest between the second semi-final and the final, but the country retained its right to vote. The inclusion of Israel among the participants in the context of the Gaza war was met with controversy, and additional security measures were put in place for the event.

The winner was Switzerland with the song "The Code", performed by Nemo who wrote it with Benjamin Alasu, Lasse Midtsian Nymann, and Linda Dale. Switzerland won the combined vote and jury vote, and placed fifth in the televote. Croatia won the televote and finished in second place, achieving its best result to date as an independent country, having previously won in 1989 as a part of Yugoslavia. Ukraine, France, and Israel completed the top five.

The EBU reported that the contest had a television audience of 163 million viewers in 37 European markets, an increase of a million viewers from the previous edition, with an additional 7.3 million viewers online on YouTube.

== Location ==
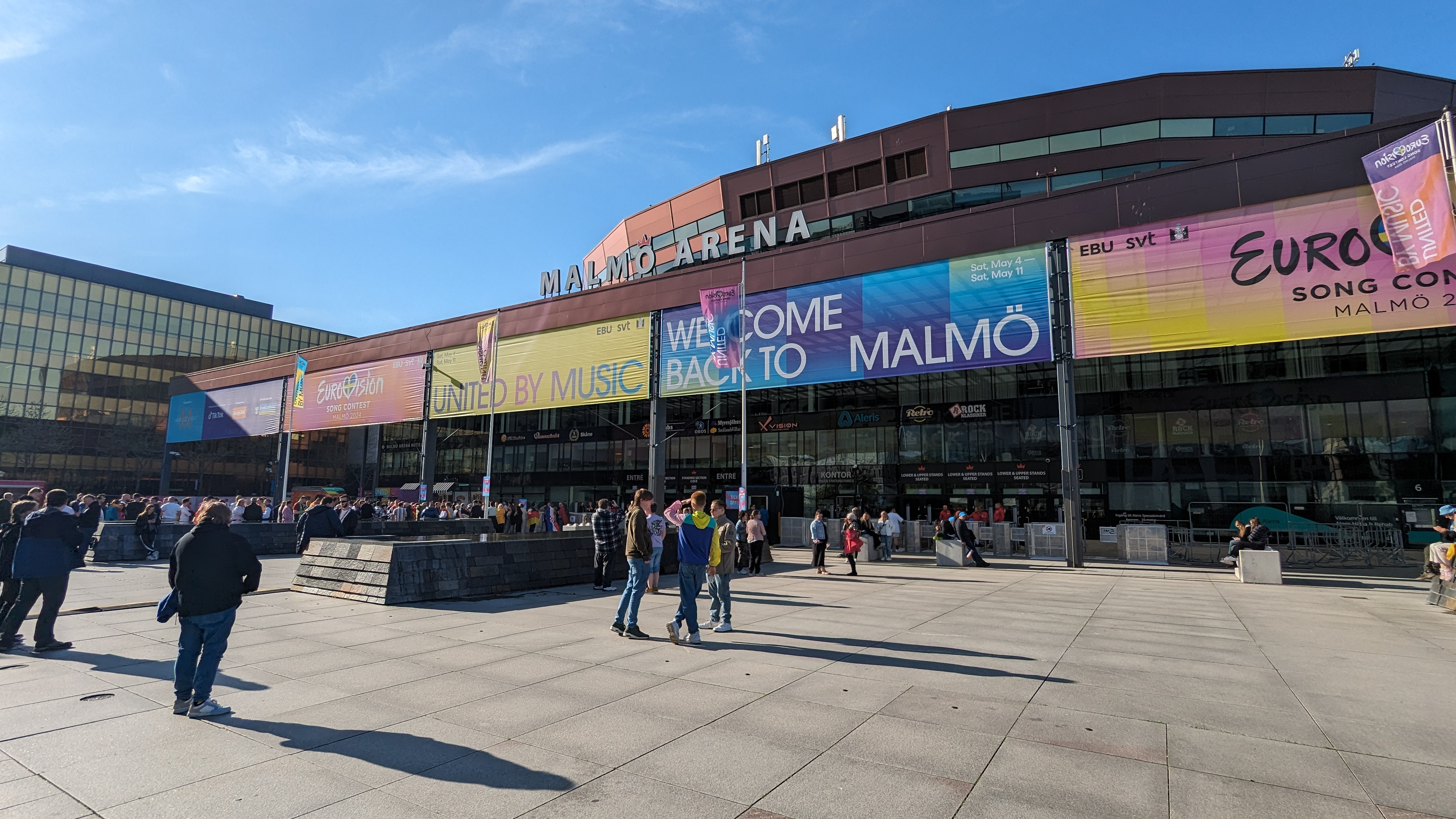
Malmö Arena – host venue of the 2024 contest

Location of host venue (red) and other contest-related sites and events (blue)

The 2024 contest took place in Malmö, Sweden, following the country's victory at the 2023 contest with the song "Tattoo", performed by Loreen. It was the seventh time Sweden had hosted the contest, having previously done so in 1975, 1985, 1992, 2000, 2013, and 2016. The venue for the contest was the 15,500-seat Malmö Arena, which had previously hosted the contest in 2013.

The Malmö Live event centre hosted several events related to the contest. It was the venue for the "Turquoise Carpet" event on 5 May 2024, where the contestants and their delegations (Note: The Israeli delegation opted not to take part due to security reasons and 5 May coinciding with Yom HaShoah.) were presented before accredited press and fans, and the opening and closing ceremonies. The venue also hosted screenings of the live shows, and was the location of the EuroClub, which hosted the official after-parties and private performances by contest participants.

A Eurovision Village was created in Folkets Park. It hosted performances by contest participants (Note: Namely those of Albania, Armenia, Austria, Azerbaijan, Belgium, Finland, Germany, Iceland, Italy, Lithuania, Malta, Moldova, Norway, Portugal, and Serbia, in addition to participants from previous editions) and local artists, as well as screenings of the live shows for the general public. A "Eurovision Street" was established on Friisgatan, stretching from Triangeln station to the Eurovision Village in Folkets Park. Planned street music performances were affected by the withdrawal of several artists due to Israel's participation in the contest and were ultimately transferred to the Eurovision Village for security reasons. The Euro Fan Café was located at Amiralen.

To celebrate the 50th anniversary of ABBA's victory at the contest in 1974 with "Waterloo", which was also Sweden's first win, a special ABBA World exhibition was held at Södergatan between 29 April and 12 May 2024.

=== Bidding phase ===
The location of the host city Malmö (in blue), shortlisted cities (in green), other bidding cities (in red) and cities and towns that expressed interest but ultimately did not bid (in grey)

After Sweden's win in the 2023 contest, the municipalities of Stockholm, Gothenburg, Malmö, Eskilstuna, Jönköping, Örnsköldsvik, Partille and Sandviken expressed interest in hosting the 2024 edition. Host broadcaster Sveriges Television (SVT) set a deadline of 12 June 2023 for interested cities to formally apply. By 13 June, it had received bids from Stockholm, Gothenburg, Malmö, and Örnsköldsvik. On 7 July, Gothenburg and Örnsköldsvik's bids were eliminated. Later that day, the EBU and SVT announced Malmö as the host city.

Key:
† Host city * Shortlisted ^ Submitted a bid

City	Venue	Notes	References
Eskilstuna	Stiga Sports Arena	Hosted the Second Chance round of Melodifestivalen in 2020. Did not meet the EBU requirements of capacity.	
Gothenburg ^	Scandinavium	Hosted the Eurovision Song Contest 1985. Roof needed adjustments for the lighting equipment. Set for demolition after the construction of a new sports facility nearby is completed.	
Jönköping	Husqvarna Garden	Hosted the heats of Melodifestivalen in 2007. Did not meet the EBU requirements of capacity.	
Malmö †	Malmö Arena	Hosted the Eurovision Song Contest 2013.	
Örnsköldsvik ^	Hägglunds Arena	Hosted the heats of Melodifestivalen in 2007, 2010, 2014, 2018 and the semi-final in 2023.	
Partille	Partille Arena	Hosted Eurovision Choir 2019. Did not meet the EBU requirements of capacity.	
Sandviken	Göransson Arena	Hosted one heat of Melodifestivalen in 2010. Plans included the cooperation of other municipalities in Gävleborg.	
Stockholm *	Friends Arena	Hosted all but one final of Melodifestivalen since 2013. Preferred venue of the Stockholm City Council.	
Stockholm *	Tele2 Arena	—	
Stockholm *	Temporary arena	Proposal set around building a temporary arena in Frihamnen, motivated by the production needs of the contest and difficulties in finding vacant venues during the required weeks.	

== Participants ==
Eurovision Song Contest 2024 – Participation summaries by country
- Albania; Armenia; Australia; Austria; Azerbaijan; Belgium; Croatia; Cyprus; Czechia; Denmark; Estonia; Finland; France; Georgia; Germany; Greece; Iceland; Ireland; Israel; Italy; Latvia; Lithuania; Luxembourg; Malta; Moldova; Netherlands; Norway; Poland; Portugal; San Marino; Serbia; Slovenia; Spain; Sweden; Switzerland; Ukraine; United Kingdom

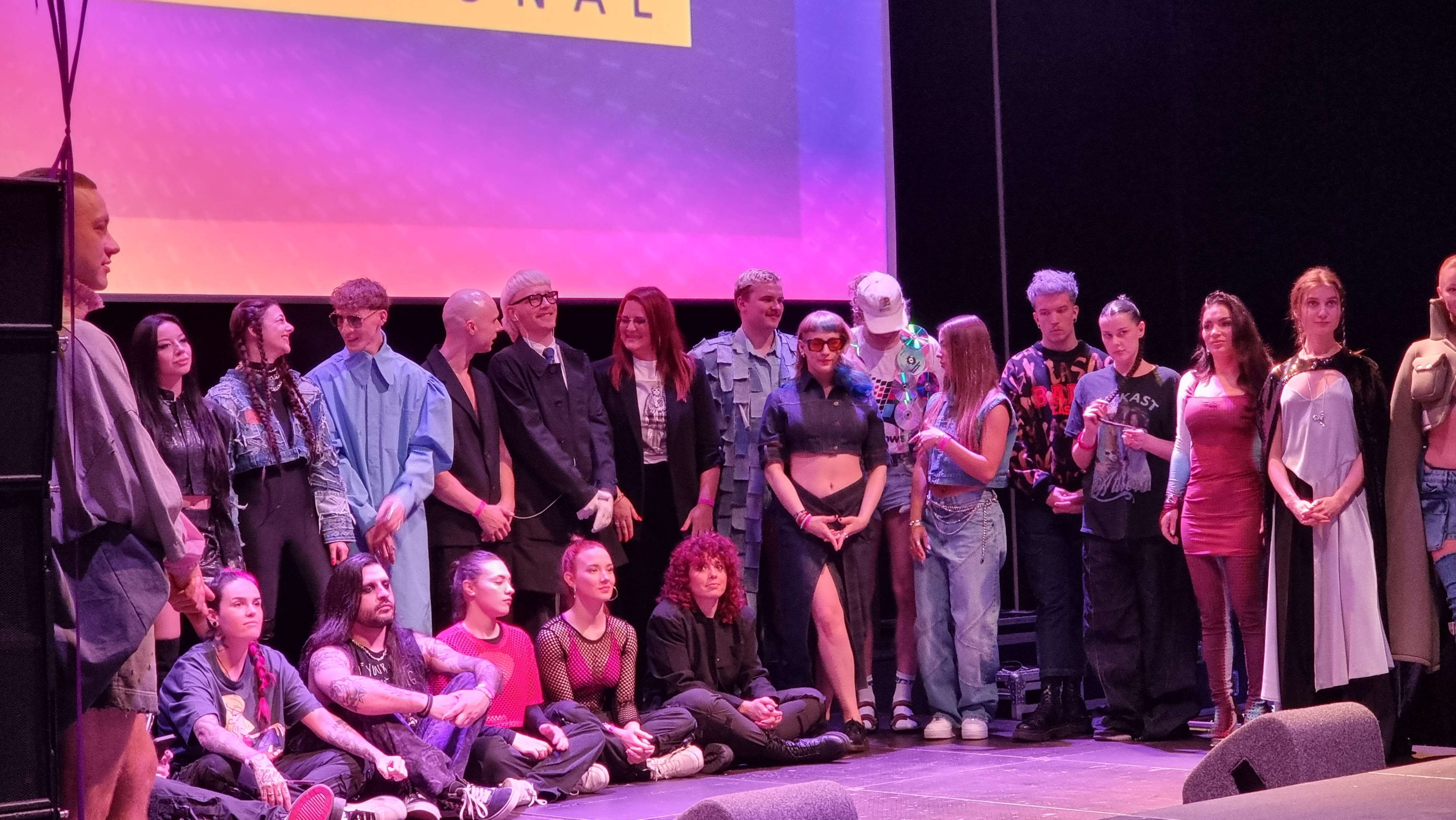
A group of participating artists of the Eurovision Song Contest 2024 at the Eurovision in Concert pre-party event in Amsterdam, April 2024

Eligibility for participation in the Eurovision Song Contest requires a national broadcaster with an active EBU membership capable of receiving the contest via the Eurovision network and broadcasting it live nationwide. The EBU issues invitations to participate in the contest to all active members.

On 5 December 2023, the EBU announced that broadcasters from 37 countries would participate in the 2024 contest. Luxembourg returned to the contest 31 years after its last participation in 1993. Romania, which participated in the 2023 contest, was provisionally announced as not participating in 2024. This was confirmed on 25 January 2024.

The contest featured two returning artists: Natalia Barbu, who had represented Moldova in 2007, and Hera Björk, who had represented Iceland in 2010.

Eurovision Song Contest 2024 participants
Country	Broadcaster	Artist	Song	Language	Songwriter(s)	Ref.
Albania	RTSH	Besa	"Titan"	English	Besa Kokëdhima; Fabrice Grandjean; Gia Koka; Kledi Bahiti	
Armenia	AMPTV	Ladaniva	"Jako" (Ժակո)	Armenian	Audrey Leclercq; Jaklin Baghdasaryan; Louis Thomas	
Australia	SBS	Electric Fields	"One Milkali (One Blood)"	English, Yankunytjatjara	Michael Ross; Zaachariaha Fielding	
Austria	ORF	Kaleen	"We Will Rave"	English	Anderz Wrethov; Jimmy Thörnfeldt; Julie Aagaard; Thomas Stengaard	
Azerbaijan	İTV	Fahree feat. Ilkin Dovlatov	"Özünlə apar"	English, Azerbaijani	Edgar Ravinov; Fakhri Ismayilov; Hasan Haydar; Madina Salikh; Tamila Rzayeva	
Belgium	RTBF	Mustii	"Before the Party's Over"	English	Arianna Damato; Benoit Leclercq; Charlotte Clark; Nina Sampermans; Pierre Dumoulin; Thomas Mustin	
Croatia	HRT	Baby Lasagna	"Rim Tim Tagi Dim"	English	Marko Purišić	
Cyprus	CyBC	Silia Kapsis	"Liar"	English	Dimitris Kontopoulos; Elke Tiel	
Czechia	ČT	Aiko	"Pedestal"	English	Alena Shirmanova-Kostebelova; Steven Ansell	
Denmark	DR	Saba	"Sand"	English	Jonas Thander; Melanie Gabriella Hayrapetian; Pil Kalinka Nygaard Jeppesen	
Estonia	ERR	5miinust and Puuluup	"(Nendest) narkootikumidest ei tea me (küll) midagi"	Estonian	Karl Kivastik; Kim Wennerström; Kristjan Jakobson; Marko Veisson; Mihkel Tamm; Priit Tomson; Ramo Teder	
Finland	Yle	Windows95man (Note: Features uncredited vocals by Henri Piispanen)	"No Rules!"	English	Henri Piispanen; Jussi Roine; Teemu Keisteri	
France	France Télévisions	Slimane	"Mon amour"	French	Meïr Salah; Slimane Nebchi; Yaacov Salah	
Georgia	GPB	Nutsa Buzaladze	"Firefighter"	English	Ada Skitka; Darko Dimitrov	
Germany	NDR (Note: On behalf of the German public broadcasting consortium ARD)	Isaak	"Always on the Run"	English	Greg Taro; Isaak Guderian; Kevin Lehr; Leo Salminen	
Greece	ERT	Marina Satti	"Zari" (Ζάρι)	Greek	Gino Borri; Jay Lewitt Stolar; Jordan Richard Palmer; Konstantin Plamenov Beshkov; Manolis Solidakis; Marina Satti; Nick Kodonas; Oge; Vlospa	
Iceland	RÚV	Hera Björk	"Scared of Heights"	English	Ásdís María Viðarsdóttir; Ferras Alqaisi; Jaro Omar; Michael Burek	
Ireland	RTÉ	Bambie Thug	"Doomsday Blue"	English	Bambie Ray Robinson; Olivia Cassy Brooking; Sam Matlock; Tyler Ryder	
Israel	IPBC	Eden Golan	"Hurricane"	English, Hebrew	Avi Ohayon; Keren Peles; Stav Beger	
Italy	RAI	Angelina Mango	"La noia"	Italian	Angelina Mango; Dario Faini; Francesca Calearo	
Latvia	LTV	Dons	"Hollow"	English	Artūrs Šingirejs; Kate Northrop; Liam Geddes	
Lithuania	LRT	Silvester Belt	"Luktelk"	Lithuanian	Džesika Šyvokaitė; Elena Jurgaitytė; Silvestras Beltė	
Luxembourg	RTL	Tali	"Fighter"	French, English	Ana Zimmer; Dario Faini; Manon Romiti; Silvio Lisbonne	
Malta	PBS	Sarah Bonnici	"Loop"	English	John Emil Johansson; Joy Deb; Kevin Lee; Linnea Deb; Leire Gotxi Angel; Matthew James Borg; Michael Joe Cini; Sarah Bonnici; Sebastian Pritchard-James	
Moldova	TRM	Natalia Barbu	"In the Middle"	English	Khris Richards; Natalia Barbu	
Netherlands	AVROTROS	Joost Klein	"Europapa"	Dutch	Donny Ellerström; Dylan van Dael; Joost Klein; Paul Elstak; Teun de Kruif; Thijmen Melissant; Tim Haars	
Norway	NRK	Gåte	"Ulveham"	Norwegian	Erlend Skjetne; Gunnhild Sundli; Magnus Børmark; Jon Even Schärer; Marit Jensen Lillebuen; Ronny Graff Janssen; Sveinung Ekloo Sundli	
Poland	TVP	Luna	"The Tower"	English	Aleksandra Katarzyna Wielgomas; Max Cooke; Paul Dixon	
Portugal	RTP	Iolanda	"Grito"	Portuguese	Alberto Hernández; Iolanda Costa	
San Marino	SMRTV	Megara	"11:11"	Spanish	Isra Dante Ramos Solomando; Roberto la Lueta Ruiz; Sara Jiménez Moral	
Serbia	RTS	Teya Dora	"Ramonda" (Рамонда)	Serbian	Andrijano Kadović; Luka Jovanović; Teodora Pavlovska	
Slovenia	RTVSLO	Raiven	"Veronika"	Slovene	Bojan Cvjetićanin; Danilo Kapel; Klavdija Kopina; Martin Bezjak; Peter Khoo; Sara Briški Cirman	
Spain	RTVE	Nebulossa	"Zorra"	Spanish	María Bas; Mark Dasousa	
Sweden	SVT	Marcus & Martinus	"Unforgettable"	English	Jimmy Thörnfeldt; Joy Deb; Linnea Deb; Marcus Gunnarsen; Martinus Gunnarsen	
Switzerland	SRG SSR	Nemo	"The Code"	English	Benjamin Alasu; Lasse Midtsian Nymann; Linda Dale; Nemo Mettler	
Ukraine	Suspilne	Alyona Alyona and Jerry Heil	"Teresa & Maria"	Ukrainian, English	Aliona Savranenko; Anton Chilibi; Ivan Klymenko; Yana Shemaieva	
United Kingdom	BBC	Olly Alexander	"Dizzy"	English	Oliver Alexander Thornton; Danny L Harle	

=== Other countries ===
Active EBU member broadcasters in Andorra, Bosnia and Herzegovina, Monaco and Slovakia confirmed non-participation prior to the announcement of the participants list by the EBU. The Romanian broadcaster, TVR, remained in talks with the EBU until 25 January 2024, when it decided not to participate due to financial reasons.

== Production ==
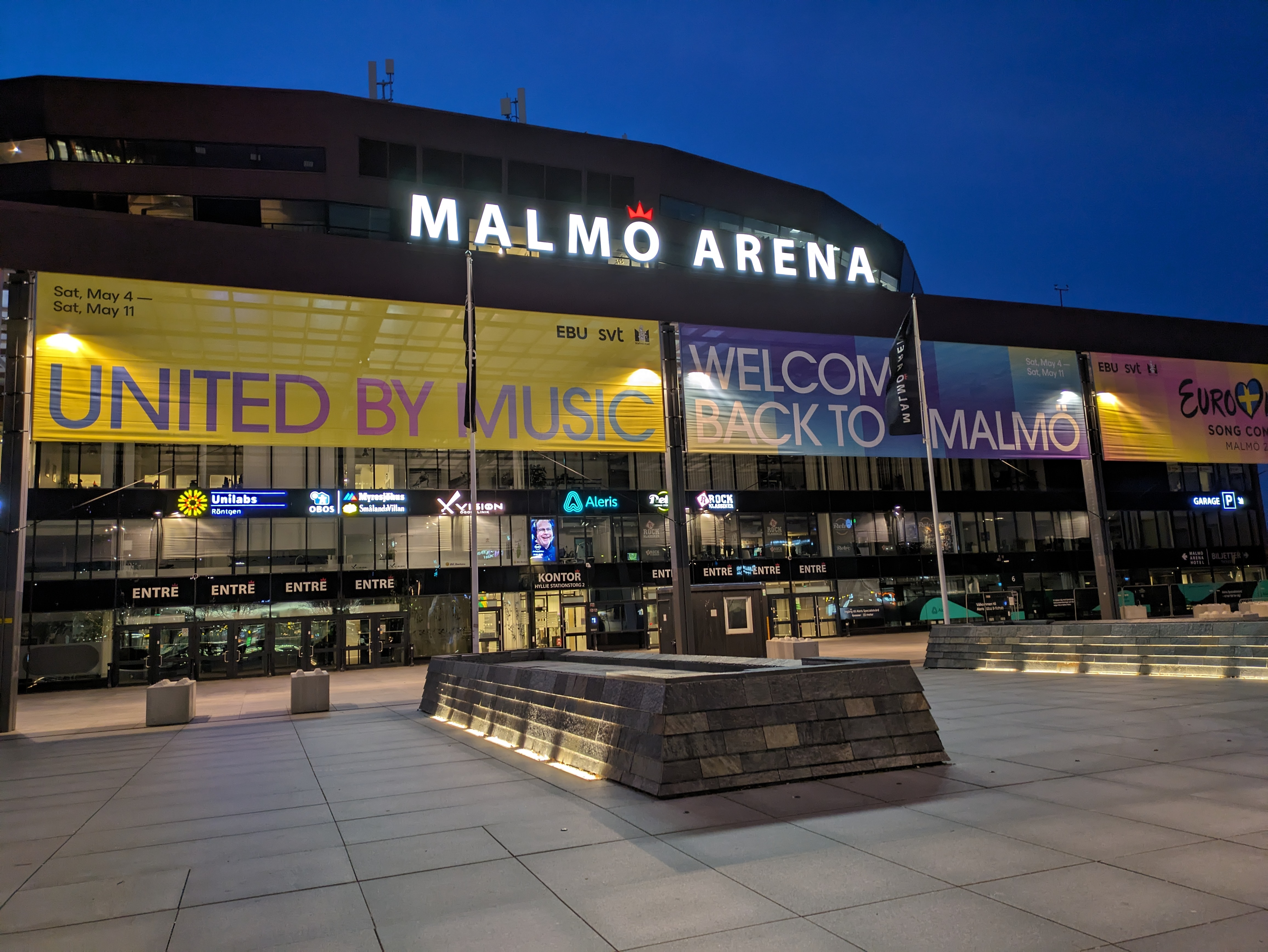
The exterior of the Malmö Arena, the host venue, during the Eurovision event weeks

The Eurovision Song Contest 2024 was produced by the Swedish national broadcaster Sveriges Television (SVT). The core team consisted of Ebba Adielsson as executive producer, Christel Tholse Willers as deputy executive producer, Tobias Åberg as executive in charge of production, Johan Bernhagen as executive line producer, Christer Björkman as contest producer, and Per Blankens as TV producer. Additional production personnel included head of production David Wessén, head of legal Mats Lindgren, head of media Madeleine Sinding-Larsen, and executive assistant Linnea Lopez.

Edward af Sillén and Daniel Réhn wrote the script for the live shows' hosting segments and the opening and interval acts, while Robin Hofwander, Daniel Jelinek and Fredrik Bäcklund served as multi-camera directors. Background music for the shows was composed by Eirik Røland and Johan Nilsson. A majority of the production personnel for 2024 previously worked in the previous three editions of the contest held in Sweden: 2000, 2013 and 2016.

Malmö Municipality initially contributed SEK 30 million (€2.5 million) to the budget of the contest. An additional SEK 12.8 million (€1.15 million) was later spent on security measures in the lead-up to and during the event. The total budget was SEK 277 million (€25.2 million), with SVT's contribution approximated at SEK 100 million (€9.1 million).

=== Slogan and visual design ===
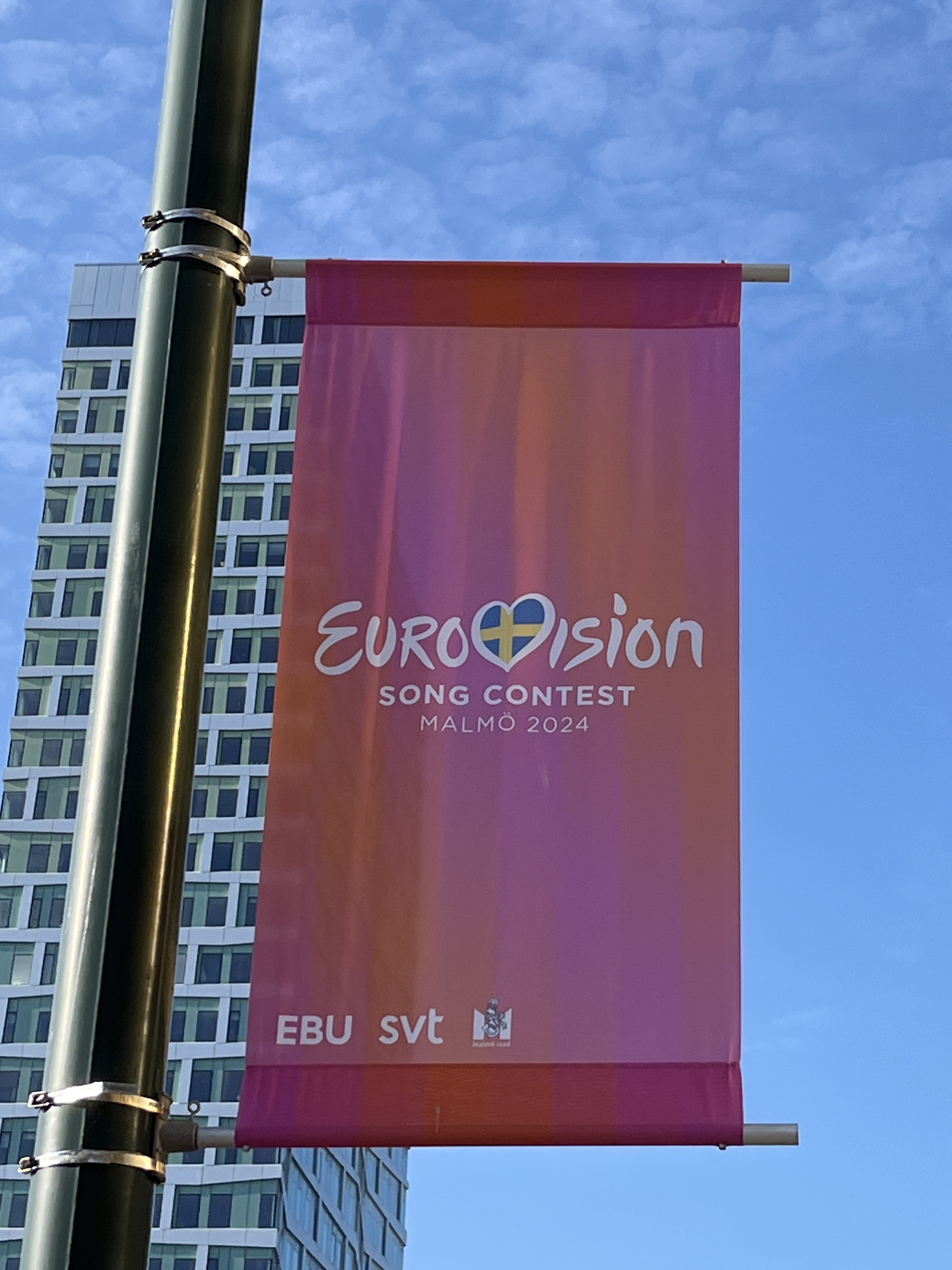
The graphic design of the 2024 contest on display in Malmö

On 14 November 2023, the EBU announced that "United by Music", the slogan of the 2023 contest, would be retained for 2024 and future editions. The accompanying theme art for 2024, named "The Eurovision Lights", was unveiled on 14 December. Designed by Stockholm-based agencies Uncut and Bold Scandinavia, it was based on simple, linear gradients inspired by vertical lines found on auroras and sound equalisers, and was built with adaptability across different formats taken into account.

=== Stage design ===
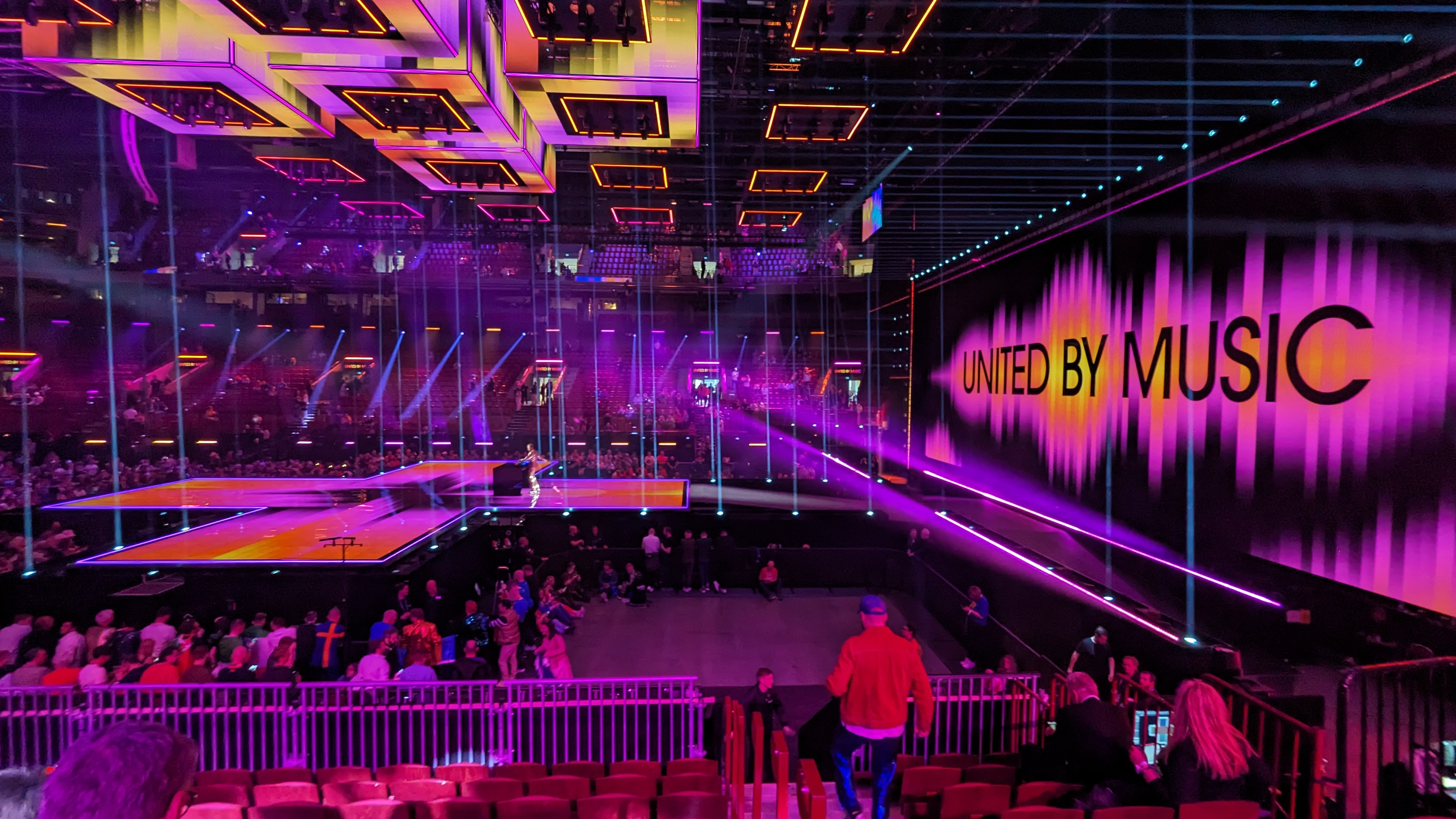
The stage in the arena

The stage design for the 2024 contest, revealed in December 2023, was devised by German production designer Florian Wieder, who had previously designed the sets of six previous contests – the most recent being in 2021. Lighting and screen content was designed by Swedish designer Fredrik Stormby. The stage featured five movable LED cubes, floors and a backdrop screen along with other lighting, video and stagecraft technology, all set around a cross-shaped centre, with the aim of "creating a unique 360-degree experience" for viewers. The green room was placed behind the backdrop screen, in a similar fashion to the stages for the 2010 and 2011 contests. Construction of the stage began on 2 April and concluded on 25 April.

=== Postcards ===
The "postcards" are short video introductions shown on television while the stage is being prepared for the next entry. Filmed between February and May 2024, the postcards were composed of footage shot by the participating artists through "selfie-mode", introducing the artists themselves and the country they represent. Archival footage of two of each country's previous entries was also used in each postcard, which ends with a slow-motion shot of each artist.

Featured entries
Country	Entries		
Country	Year	Artist	Song
Albania	2009	Kejsi Tola	"Carry Me in Your Dreams"
Albania	2012	Rona Nishliu	"Suus"
Armenia	2009	Inga and Anush	"Jan Jan" (Ջան Ջան)
Armenia	2022	Rosa Linn	"Snap"
Australia	2015	Guy Sebastian	"Tonight Again"
Australia	2019	Kate Miller-Heidke	"Zero Gravity"
Austria	2014	Conchita Wurst	"Rise Like a Phoenix"
Austria	2018	Cesár Sampson	"Nobody but You"
Azerbaijan	2009	Aysel and Arash	"Always"
Azerbaijan	2011	Ell and Nikki	"Running Scared"
Belgium	1986	Sandra Kim	"J'aime la vie"
Belgium	2015	Loïc Nottet	"Rhythm Inside"
Croatia	1999	Doris Dragović	"Marija Magdalena"
Croatia	2023	Let 3	"Mama ŠČ!"
Cyprus	1997	Hara and Andreas Konstantinou	"Mana mou" (Μάνα μου)
Cyprus	2012	Ivi Adamou	"La La Love"
Czechia	2018	Mikolas Josef	"Lie to Me"
Czechia	2022	We Are Domi	"Lights Off"
Denmark	1988	Hot Eyes	"Ka' du se hva' jeg sa'"
Denmark	2000	Olsen Brothers	"Fly on the Wings of Love"
Estonia	2001	Tanel Padar, Dave Benton and 2XL	"Everybody"
Estonia	2009	Urban Symphony	"Rändajad"
Finland	1994	CatCat	"Bye Bye Baby"
Finland	2023	Käärijä	"Cha Cha Cha"
France	1977	Marie Myriam	"L'Oiseau et l'Enfant"
France	2021	Barbara Pravi	"Voilà"
Georgia	2007	Sopho	"Visionary Dream"
Georgia	2015	Nina Sublatti	"Warrior"
Germany	1994	Mekado	"Wir geben 'ne Party"
Germany	2010	Lena	"Satellite"
Greece	1974	Marinella	"Krasi, thalassa kai t' agori mou" (Κρασί, θάλασσα και τ' αγόρι μου)
Greece	2005	Helena Paparizou	"My Number One"
Iceland	1986	ICY	"Gleðibankinn"
Iceland	2021	Daði og Gagnamagnið	"10 Years"
Ireland	1987	Johnny Logan	"Hold Me Now"
Ireland	2011	Jedward	"Lipstick"
Israel	1991	Duo Datz	"Kan" (כאן)
Israel	1998	Dana International	"Diva" (דיווה)
Italy	1987	Umberto Tozzi and Raf	"Gente di mare"
Italy	2021	Måneskin	"Zitti e buoni"
Latvia	2002	Marie N	"I Wanna"
Latvia	2015	Aminata	"Love Injected"
Lithuania	2012	Donny Montell	"Love Is Blind"
Lithuania	2021	The Roop	"Discoteque"
Luxembourg	1965	France Gall	"Poupée de cire, poupée de son"
Luxembourg	1988	Lara Fabian	"Croire"
Malta	1998	Chiara	"The One That I Love"
Malta	2021	Destiny	"Je me casse"
Moldova	2005	Zdob și Zdub	"Boonika bate doba"
Moldova	2010	SunStroke Project and Olia Tira	"Run Away"
Netherlands	1998	Edsilia Rombley	"Hemel en aarde"
Netherlands	2019	Duncan Laurence	"Arcade"
Norway	1986	Ketil Stokkan	"Romeo"
Norway	2009	Alexander Rybak	"Fairytale"
Poland	1994	Edyta Górniak	"To nie ja!"
Poland	2014	Donatan and Cleo	"My Słowianie – We Are Slavic"
Portugal	1982	Doce	"Bem bom"
Portugal	2017	Salvador Sobral	"Amar pelos dois"
San Marino	2014	Valentina Monetta	"Maybe"
San Marino	2019	Serhat	"Say Na Na Na"
Serbia	2007	Marija Šerifović	"Molitva" (Молитва)
Serbia	2022	Konstrakta	"In corpore sano"
Slovenia	2001	Nuša Derenda	"Energy"
Slovenia	2019	Zala Kralj and Gašper Šantl	"Sebi"
Spain	1968	Massiel	"La La La"
Spain	2022	Chanel	"SloMo"
Sweden	1983	Carola	"Främling"
Sweden	2023	Loreen	"Tattoo"
Switzerland	1988	Céline Dion	"Ne partez pas sans moi"
Switzerland	2021	Gjon's Tears	"Tout l'univers"
Ukraine	2004	Ruslana	"Wild Dances"
Ukraine	2021	Go_A	"Shum" (Шум)
United Kingdom	1967	Sandie Shaw	"Puppet on a String"
United Kingdom	2022	Sam Ryder	"Space Man"

=== Presenters ===
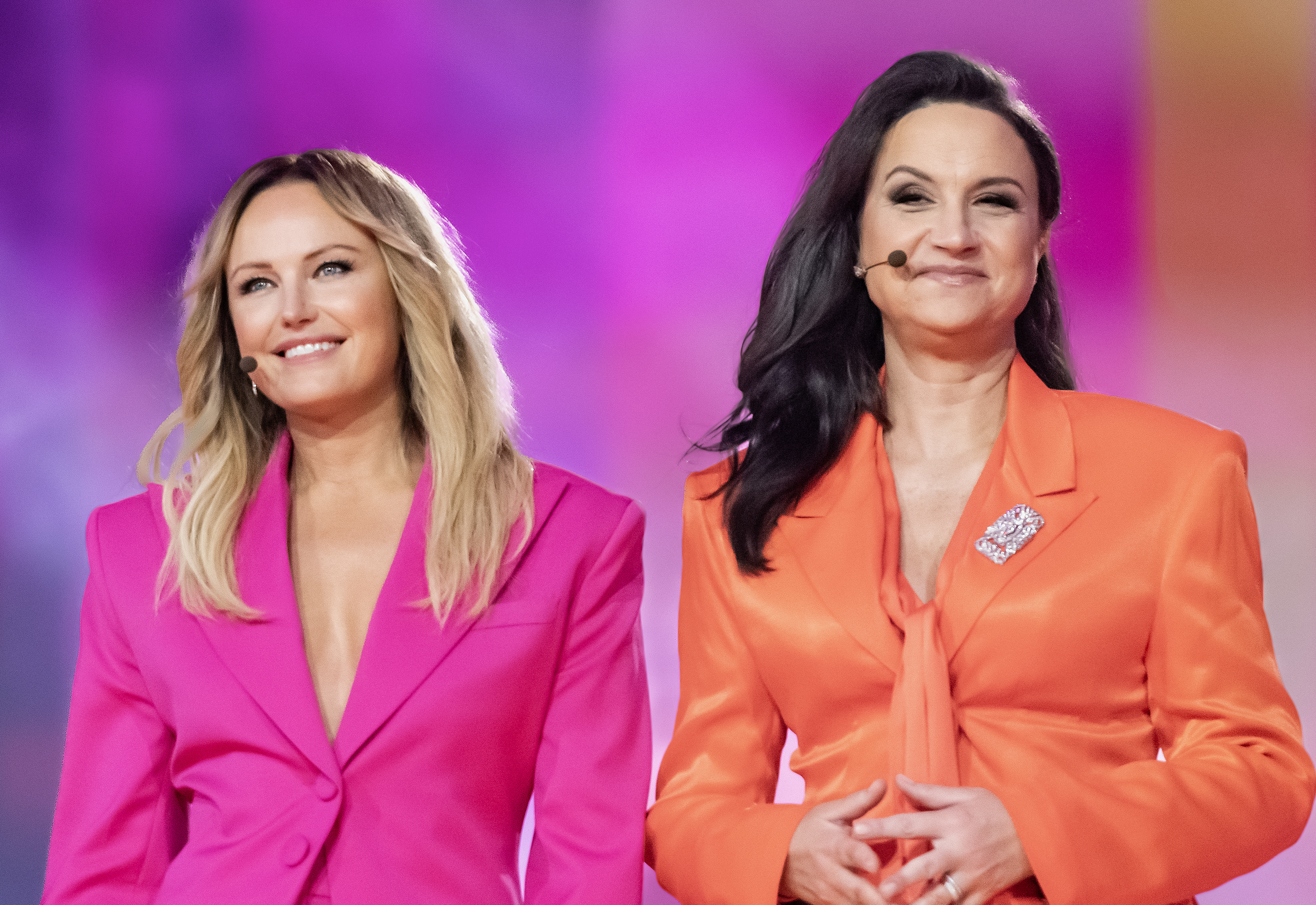
Malin Åkerman and Petra Mede, presenters of the 2024 contest

Swedish comedian and television host Petra Mede and Swedish-American actress Malin Åkerman were announced as the presenters of the 2024 contest on 5 February 2024. Mede had previously hosted both the 2013 and 2016 editions (solo and with Måns Zelmerlöw, respectively), as well as the 2015 special anniversary programme Eurovision Song Contest's Greatest Hits alongside Graham Norton. The "Turquoise Carpet" and opening ceremony events were hosted by Elecktra and Tia Kofi, while Jovan Radomir moderated the contest's press conferences.

=== Security ===
In November 2023, the production team at SVT stated its intention to increase security measures and to keep in contact with Malmö's police authority during the contest, citing a tense climate of protest amid Israel's participation. This included police reinforcement from Denmark and Norway, tightened cybersecurity, and a no-fly zone to prevent drone attacks, as well as adjustments to the number of locations set to host side events. A total of SEK 92 million was spent on the 1,500 police officers present for the competition, which was the largest police operation in the history of Sweden; the Swedish Police Authority covered the costs for the Danish and Norwegian reinforcements. Israeli broadcaster Kan also expressed concerns over the safety of Israelis in Malmö, after the country's National Security Council listed the city as a "dangerous destination" for Israeli citizens in its official travel recommendations. Additional measures were taken to protect the Israeli delegation, with the country's representative Eden Golan being escorted by Shin Bet agents in addition to local police officers following death threats directed at her via social media. Shin Bet also sent a delegation to Malmö, headed by its director Ronen Bar, to prevent potential threats against them. Thousands of pro-Palestinian demonstrators gathered in Malmö to protest against Israel's participation in the competition.

SVT's decision was made in the context of a high terroristic threat level in Sweden, with the Swedish Security Service (SÄPO) having raised the level from 3 to 4 out of 5 in August 2023, primarily in response to the 2023 Quran burnings in the country and prior to the Gaza war. Concerns about the risk of terrorist attacks resurged in the wake of the Crocus City Hall attack outside Moscow on 22 March 2024. In the event of an emergency, Malmö Municipality would provide accommodations in local schools and sports facilities as well as psychological support.

== Format ==
=== Voting system and contest structure ===
After the outcome of the 2023 contest, which saw Sweden win despite Finland's lead in the televoting, sparked controversy among the audience, Norwegian broadcaster NRK began discussions with the EBU regarding a potential revision of the jury voting procedure. It was noted that Norwegian entries in recent years had been penalised by the juries, particularly in 2019 and 2023, when Norway finished in sixth and fifth place overall, respectively, despite coming first in 2019 and third in 2023 with the televote. In an interview, the Norwegian head of delegation Stig Karlsen discussed the idea of reducing the jury's weight on the final score, from the current 49.4%, to 40% or 30%. No changes to the voting system were ultimately implemented in this regard.

For 2024, the "Rest of the World" voting window was open for 24 hours before each show, as well as during each show. For participating countries, it was open after the last song is performed – as in previous years – in the semi-finals. In the final, it was opened just before the first performance and closed 25 minutes after the last performance. (Note: The voting window had been extended to commence before the first competing performance on two previous occasions: in 2010 and 2011.) The automatic qualifiers – the host country and the "Big Five" – performed their entries in full during the semi-finals, in between the competing acts. Following an incident which ultimately led to the disqualification of the Dutch representative, the opening of the "Rest of the World" voting window for the final was delayed until eight hours before the show.

13 of the 25 open positions in the running order of the final were subject to a "producer's choice" draw option, alongside six positions available each, for the first half and second half of the show. For the countries which drew the "producer's choice" category, the contest producers were able to place that country anywhere in the running order. The runtime of the final was initially planned to be reduced by approximately an hour. This was ultimately not a priority, with the final planned to be shortened by a maximum of five minutes.

=== Semi-final allocation draw ===
Results of the semi-final allocation draw Participating countries in the first semi-final Pre-qualified for the final but also voting in the first semi-final Participating countries in the second semi-final Pre-qualified for the final but also voting in the second semi-final

The draw to determine the participating countries' semi-finals took place on 30 January 2024 at 19:00 CET, at the Malmö Town Hall. The thirty-one semi-finalists were divided over five pots, based on historical voting patterns, with the purpose of reducing the chance of bloc voting and increasing suspense in the semi-finals. The draw also determined which semi-final each of the six automatic qualifiers – host country Sweden and "Big Five" countries (France, Germany, Italy, Spain and the United Kingdom) – would vote in and be required to broadcast. The ceremony was hosted by Pernilla Månsson Colt and Farah Abadi, and included the passing of the host city insignia from Steve Rotheram, the mayor of the Liverpool City Region representing the previous host city Liverpool, to Katrin Stjernfeldt Jammeh, the mayor of Malmö Municipality.

With the approval from the contest's reference group, Israel was allocated to the second semi-final following a request from Israeli broadcaster Kan, as the rehearsal date for the first semi-final coincided with Yom HaShoah.

Pot 1	Pot 2	Pot 3	Pot 4	Pot 5
Albania; Austria; Croatia; Serbia; Slovenia; Switzerland	Australia; Denmark; Estonia; Finland; Iceland; Norway	Armenia; Azerbaijan; Georgia; Israel (Note: Israel was allocated to the second semi-final at the request of the Israeli broadcaster Kan.); Latvia; Lithuania; Ukraine	Cyprus; Greece; Ireland; Malta; Portugal; San Marino	Belgium; Czechia; Luxembourg; Moldova; Netherlands; Poland

== Contest overview ==
=== Semi-final 1 ===
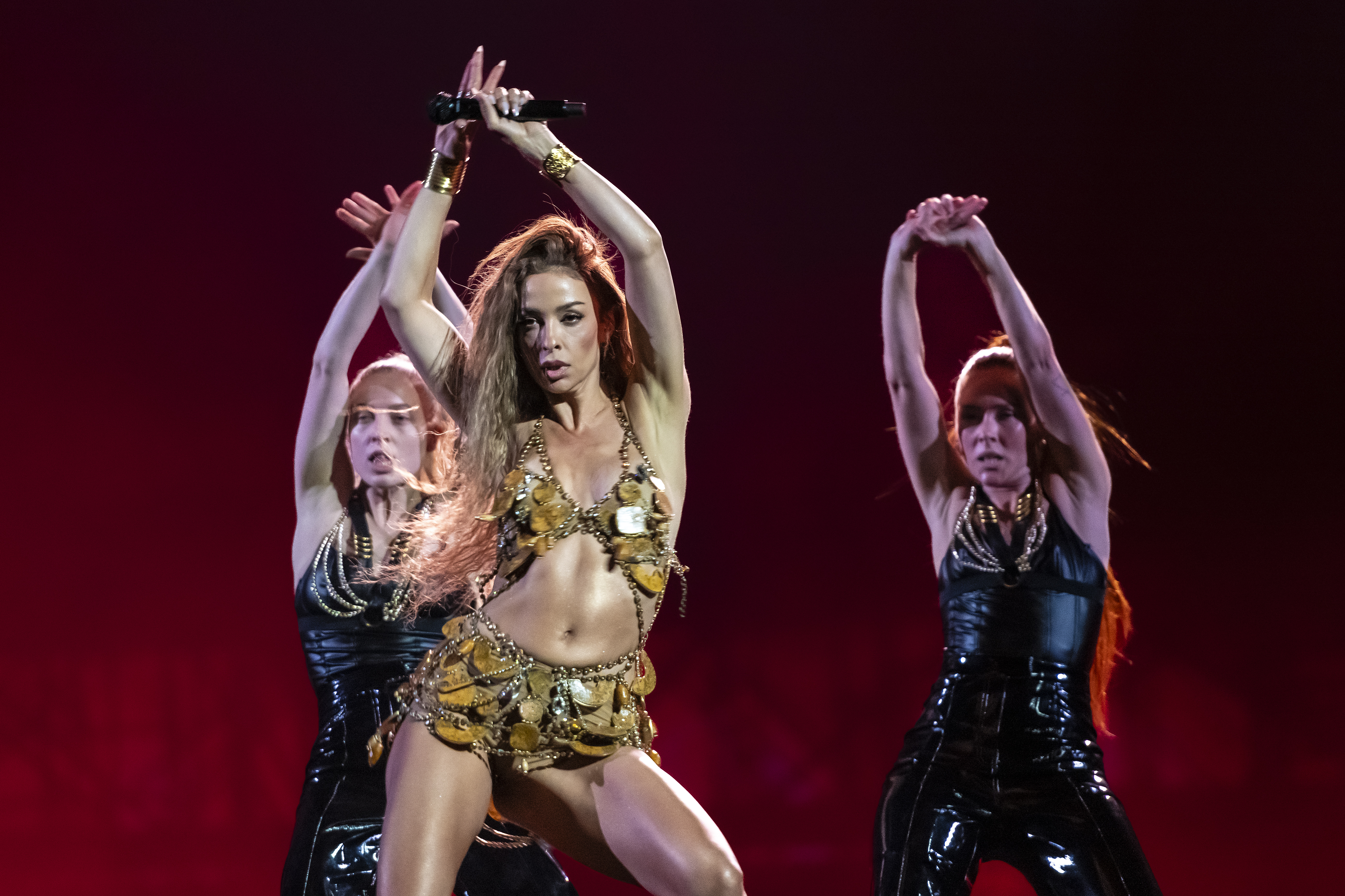
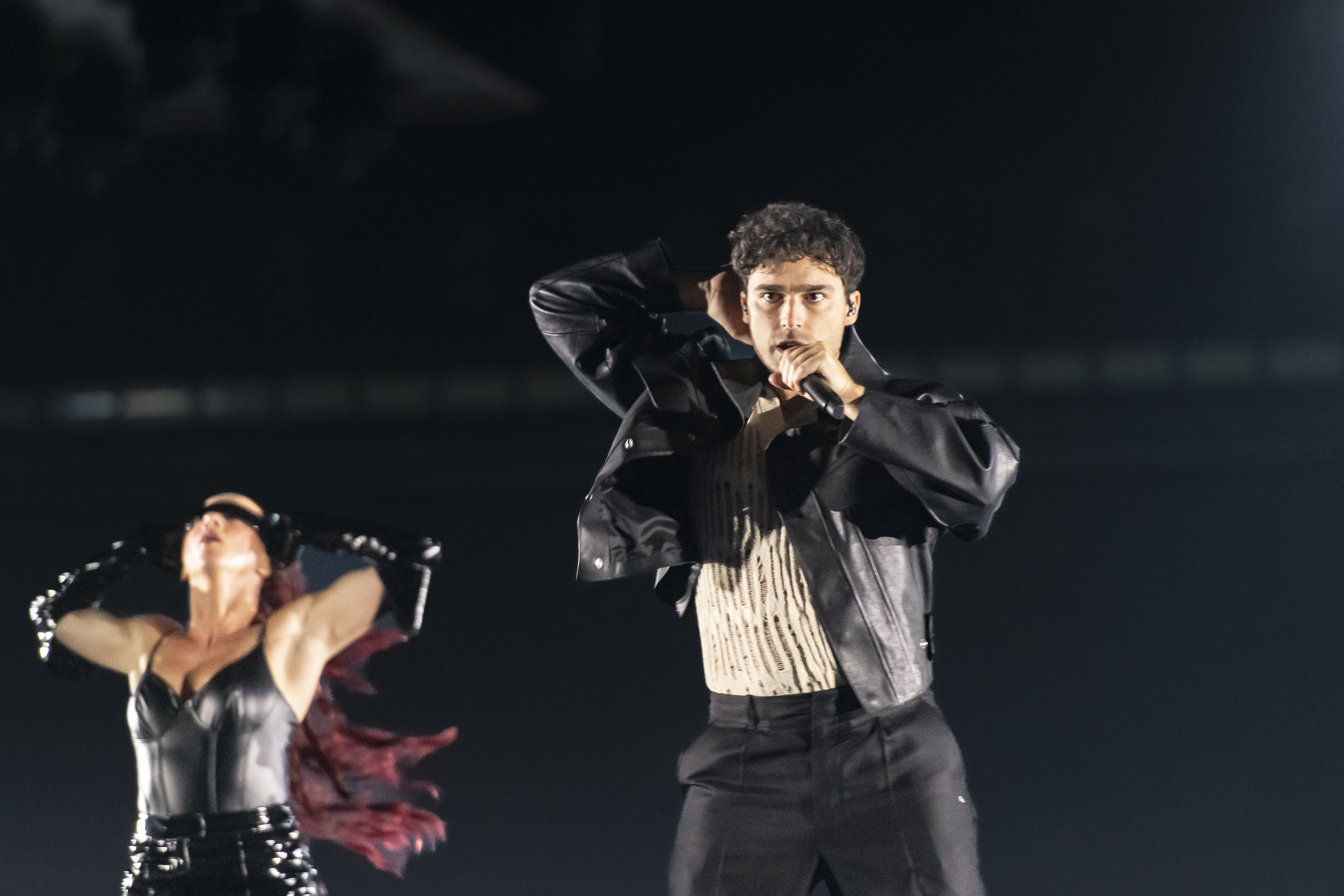
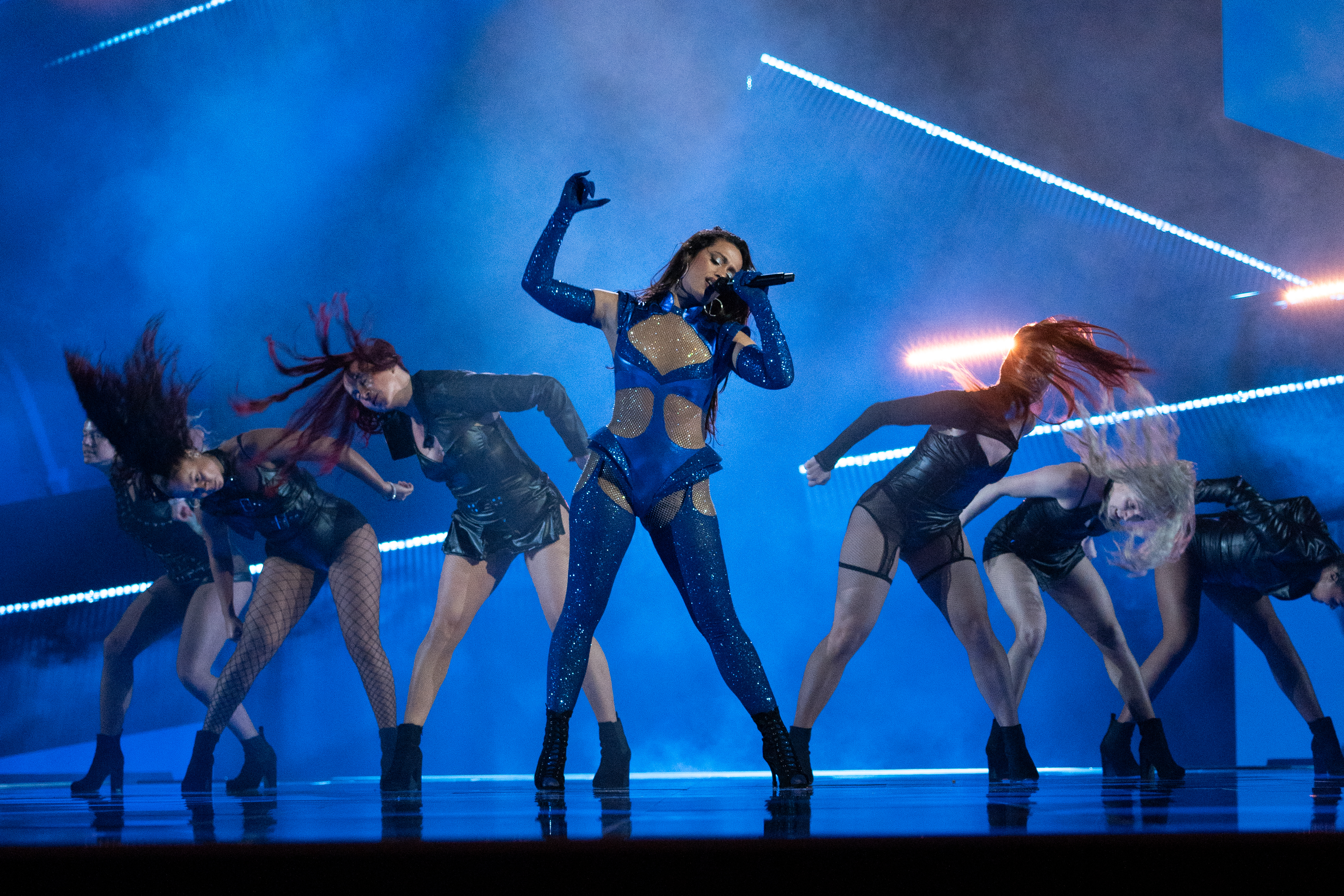
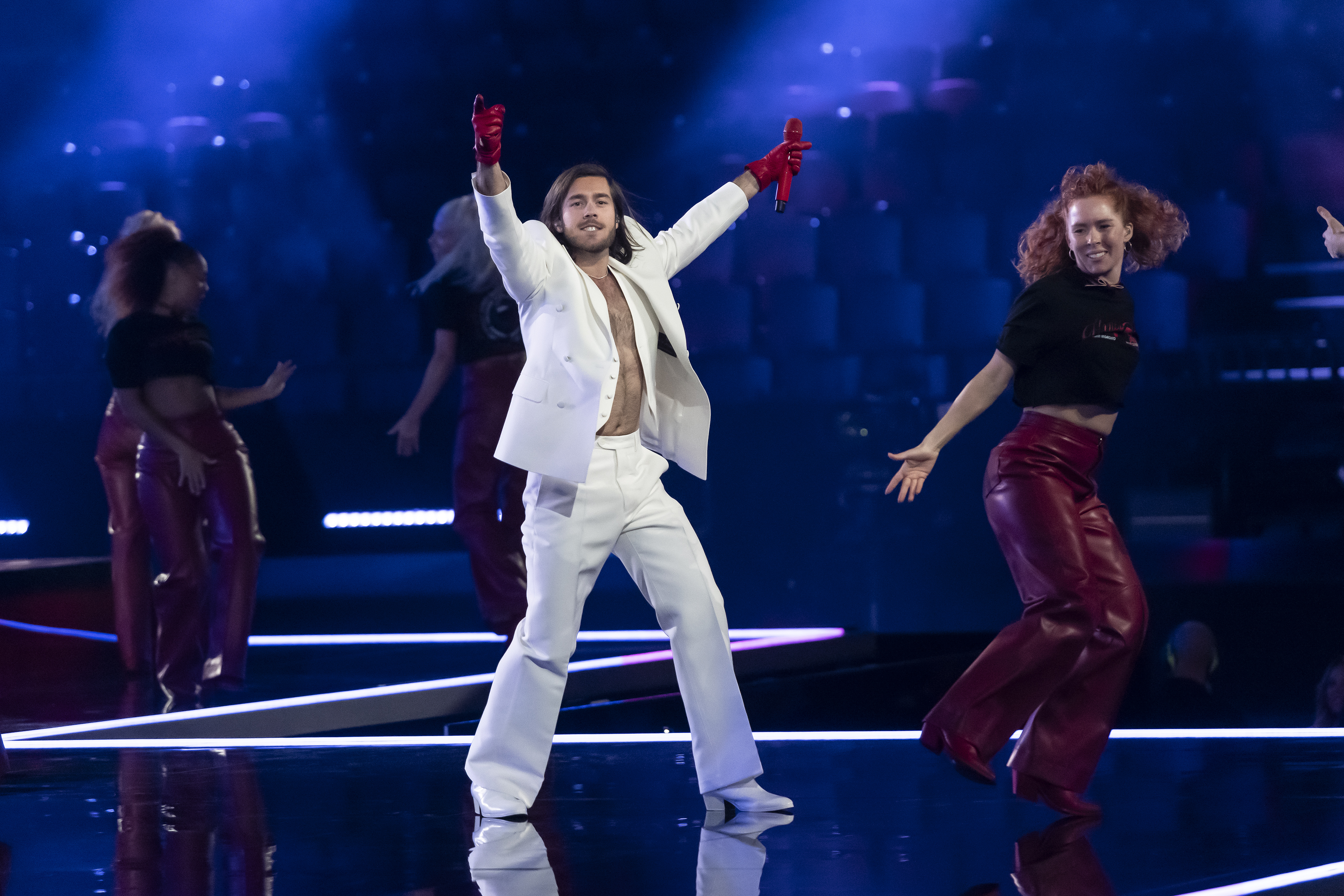
Eleni Foureira, Eric Saade and Chanel performed as opening acts, while Benjamin Ingrosso performed as an interval act in the first semi-final.

The first semi-final took place on 7 May 2024 at 21:00 CEST and featured fifteen competing countries. Those countries, plus Germany, Sweden and the United Kingdom, as well as non-participating countries under an aggregated "Rest of the World" vote, voted in this semi-final. The running order (R/O) was determined by the contest producers and was announced publicly on 26 March. In addition to the competing entries, the United Kingdom, Germany and Sweden performed their entries during the show, appearing on stage after the entries from Ireland, Iceland and Moldova, respectively. Croatia was awarded the most points in the semi-final, and qualified for the final alongside, in order of points total, Ukraine, Ireland, Lithuania, Luxembourg, Cyprus, Finland, Portugal, Slovenia, and Serbia. The countries that failed to reach the final were Australia, Poland, Moldova, Azerbaijan, and Iceland.

This semi-final was opened by former participants Eleni Foureira, Eric Saade, and Chanel, who performed their respective competing songs – "Fuego" (Cyprus 2018), "Popular" (Sweden 2011), and "SloMo" (Spain 2022). The interval acts included 1980 and 1987 winner for Ireland, Johnny Logan, performing the 2012 Swedish winning entry "Euphoria", and Benjamin Ingrosso, who represented Sweden in 2018, performing a medley of his songs "Look Who's Laughing Now", "Kite", and "Honey Boy".

Qualifiers

First semi-final of the Eurovision Song Contest 2024
R/O	Country	Artist	Song	Points	Place
1	Cyprus	Silia Kapsis	"Liar"	67	6
2	Serbia	Teya Dora	"Ramonda"	47	10
3	Lithuania	Silvester Belt	"Luktelk"	119	4
4	Ireland	Bambie Thug	"Doomsday Blue"	124	3
5	Ukraine	Alyona Alyona and Jerry Heil	"Teresa & Maria"	173	2
6	Poland	Luna	"The Tower"	35	12
7	Croatia	Baby Lasagna	"Rim Tim Tagi Dim"	177	1
8	Iceland	Hera Björk	"Scared of Heights"	3	15
9	Slovenia	Raiven	"Veronika"	51	9
10	Finland	Windows95man	"No Rules!"	59	7
11	Moldova	Natalia Barbu	"In the Middle"	20	13
12	Azerbaijan	Fahree feat. Ilkin Dovlatov	"Özünlə apar"	11	14
13	Australia	Electric Fields	"One Milkali (One Blood)"	41	11
14	Portugal	Iolanda	"Grito"	58	8
15	Luxembourg	Tali	"Fighter"	117	5

=== Semi-final 2 ===
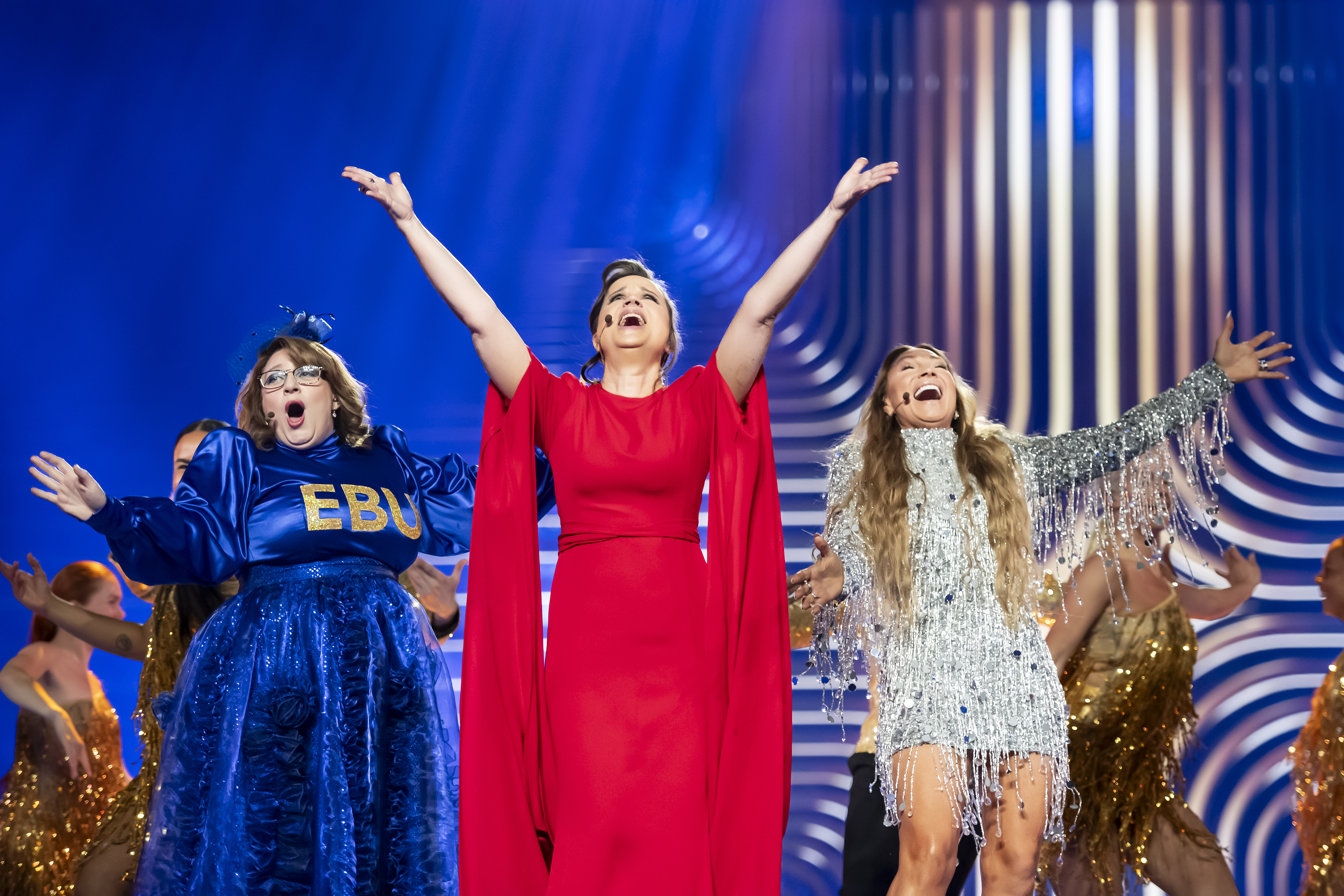
Sarah Dawn Finer (in character as Lynda Woodruff), presenter Petra Mede, and Charlotte Perrelli performed the musical number "We Just Love Eurovision Too Much" as an interval act in the second semi-final.

The second semi-final took place on 9 May 2024 at 21:00 CEST and features sixteen competing countries. Those countries plus France, Italy and Spain, as well as non-participating countries under an aggregated "Rest of the World" vote, voted in this semi-final. The running order (R/O) was determined by the contest producers and was announced publicly on 26 March. In addition to the competing entries, France, Spain and Italy performed their entries during the show, appearing on stage after the entries from Czechia, Latvia and Estonia, respectively. Israel was awarded the most points in the semi-final, and qualified for the final alongside, in order of points total, the Netherlands, Armenia, Switzerland, Greece, Estonia, Latvia, Georgia, Austria, and Norway. The countries that failed to reach the final were Czechia, Denmark, Belgium, San Marino, Albania, and Malta.

This semi-final was opened by a pre-recorded segment, in which presenters Petra Mede and Malin Åkerman performed the 2023 winning song "Tattoo" with minor lyrical changes. The interval acts included Helena Paparizou, Charlotte Perrelli and Sertab Erener performing their respective winning songs – "My Number One" (Greece 2005), "Take Me to Your Heaven" (Sweden 1999) and "Everyway That I Can" (Turkey 2003) – with the audience taking part in a sing-along; and "We Just Love Eurovision Too Much", a musical number performed by Mede that satirised various aspects of the contest and Sweden's success in the event, with appearances by Perrelli, Sarah Dawn Finer reprising her role as Lynda Woodruff, and Käärijä performing an excerpt of his entry for Finland in 2023, "Cha Cha Cha". Herreys, who won for Sweden in 1984, performed their winning song "Diggi-Loo Diggi-Ley" after the qualifiers were announced.

Qualifiers

Second semi-final of the Eurovision Song Contest 2024
R/O	Country	Artist	Song	Points	Place
1	Malta	Sarah Bonnici	"Loop"	13	16
2	Albania	Besa	"Titan"	14	15
3	Greece	Marina Satti	"Zari"	86	5
4	Switzerland	Nemo	"The Code"	132	4
5	Czechia	Aiko	"Pedestal"	38	11
6	Austria	Kaleen	"We Will Rave"	46	9
7	Denmark	Saba	"Sand"	36	12
8	Armenia	Ladaniva	"Jako"	137	3
9	Latvia	Dons	"Hollow"	72	7
10	San Marino	Megara	"11:11"	16	14
11	Georgia	Nutsa Buzaladze	"Firefighter"	54	8
12	Belgium	Mustii	"Before the Party's Over"	18	13
13	Estonia	5miinust and Puuluup	"(Nendest) narkootikumidest ei tea me (küll) midagi"	79	6
14	Israel	Eden Golan	"Hurricane"	194	1
15	Norway	Gåte	"Ulveham"	43	10
16	Netherlands	Joost Klein	"Europapa"	182	2

=== Final ===
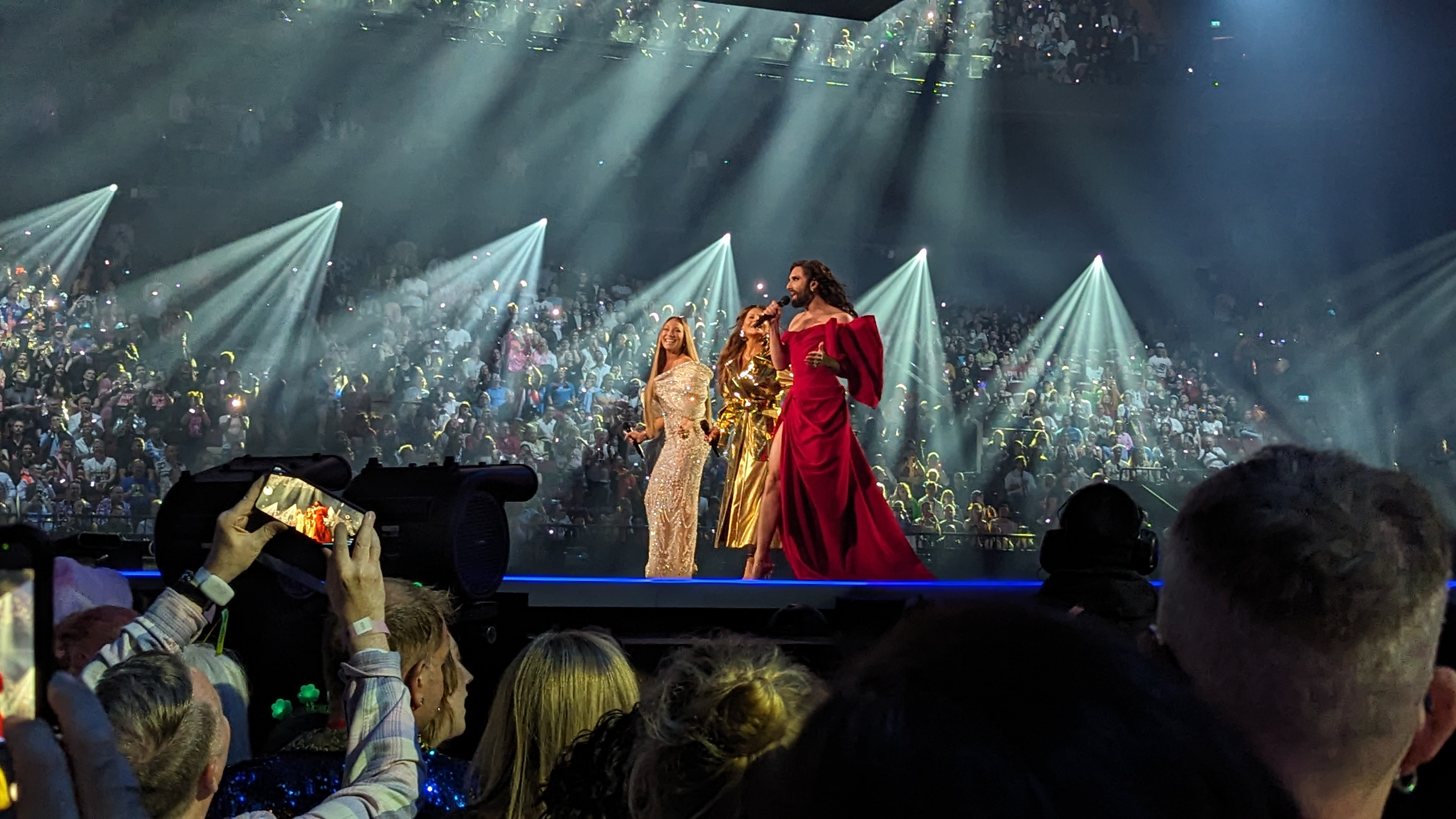
Charlotte Perrelli, Carola, and Conchita Wurst performed "Waterloo" as an interval act in the final.

The final took place on 11 May 2024 at 21:00 CEST and featured 25 competing countries. All 37 participating countries with jury and televote, as well as non-participating countries under an aggregated "Rest of the World" online vote, voted in the final. The running order (R/O) of the host nation was determined by a random draw on 11 March during the annual meeting of heads of the participating delegations. The running order for the remaining finalists was determined by the contest producers following the second semi-final. Despite qualifying for the final, where it was set to perform in position 5, the Netherlands was disqualified due to a backstage incident between its entrant Joost Klein and a member of the production team. It retained the right to vote in the final, and all countries that were set to perform after the Netherlands retained their running order numbers.

Switzerland won the contest with the song "The Code", performed by Nemo and written by them along with Benjamin Alasu, Lasse Midtsian Nymann, and Linda Dale. Switzerland won with 591 points, also winning the jury vote. It was the country's third win in the contest, following victories in the inaugural edition in 1956 and in 1988. Croatia came second with 547 points and won the televote, with Ukraine, France, Israel, Ireland, Italy, Armenia, Sweden, and Portugal completing the top ten. Georgia, Spain, Slovenia, Austria, and Norway occupied the bottom five positions.

The final was opened by Björn Skifs performing "Hooked on a Feeling", followed by the flag parade, introducing all twenty-five finalists, set to a medley of well-known Swedish hits. (Note: Namely "I Love It", "Beautiful Life", "The Look", "I Follow Rivers", "Sun Is Shining", "Gimme! Gimme! Gimme! (A Man After Midnight)", and "The Winner Takes It All") In a pre-recorded segment during a break between the competing performances, Sarah Dawn Finer as Lynda Woodruff performed a song about the contest's executive supervisor Martin Österdahl, "You're Good to Go", which was later released as a single. The interval acts included Alcazar performing "Crying at the Discoteque"; a tribute performance of the 1974 Swedish winning song "Waterloo" by three past winners – Carola (Sweden 1991), Charlotte Perrelli (Sweden 1999) and Conchita Wurst (Austria 2014) – preceded by a pre-recorded segment from the ABBA Voyage concert residency in London in which the song's original performers, ABBA, as their virtual avatar selves in the concert, discussed their Eurovision experience on the occasion of its 50th anniversary; and Loreen performing her new single "Forever" and her 2023 winning song "Tattoo". Presenter Petra Mede also parodied the postcards in a short video skit, with archival footage from her previous hostings in 2013 and 2016 being featured. Following a reprise of their winning song, Nemo broke the trophy, although its design had been strengthened after the one presented to Alexander Rybak in 2009 met a similar fate.

Winner

Final of the Eurovision Song Contest 2024
R/O	Country	Artist	Song	Points	Place
1	Sweden	Marcus & Martinus	"Unforgettable"	174	9
2	Ukraine	Alyona Alyona and Jerry Heil	"Teresa & Maria"	453	3
3	Germany	Isaak	"Always on the Run"	117	12
4	Luxembourg	Tali	"Fighter"	103	13
5	~~Netherlands~~	~~Joost Klein~~	~~"Europapa"~~	—	—
6	Israel	Eden Golan	"Hurricane"	375	5
7	Lithuania	Silvester Belt	"Luktelk"	90	14
8	Spain	Nebulossa	"Zorra"	30	22
9	Estonia	5miinust and Puuluup	"(Nendest) narkootikumidest ei tea me (küll) midagi"	37	20
10	Ireland	Bambie Thug	"Doomsday Blue"	278	6
11	Latvia	Dons	"Hollow"	64	16
12	Greece	Marina Satti	"Zari"	126	11
13	United Kingdom	Olly Alexander	"Dizzy"	46	18
14	Norway	Gåte	"Ulveham"	16	25
15	Italy	Angelina Mango	"La noia"	268	7
16	Serbia	Teya Dora	"Ramonda"	54	17
17	Finland	Windows95man	"No Rules!"	38	19
18	Portugal	Iolanda	"Grito"	152	10
19	Armenia	Ladaniva	"Jako"	183	8
20	Cyprus	Silia Kapsis	"Liar"	78	15
21	Switzerland	Nemo	"The Code"	591	1
22	Slovenia	Raiven	"Veronika"	27	23
23	Croatia	Baby Lasagna	"Rim Tim Tagi Dim"	547	2
24	Georgia	Nutsa Buzaladze	"Firefighter"	34	21
25	France	Slimane	"Mon amour"	445	4
26	Austria	Kaleen	"We Will Rave"	24	24

==== Spokespersons ====
The spokespersons announced the 12-point score from their respective country's national jury in the following order:

1. Ukraine – Jamala
2. United Kingdom – Joanna Lumley
3. Luxembourg – Désirée Nosbusch
4. Azerbaijan – Aysel Teymurzadeh
5. San Marino – Kida
6. Malta – Matt Blxck
7. Croatia – Ivan Dorian Molnar
8. Albania – Andri Xhahu
9. Czechia – Radka Rosická
10. Israel – Maya Alkulumbre
11. Australia – Danny Estrin
12. Denmark – Stéphanie Surrugue
13. Spain – Soraya Arnelas
14. Norway – Ingvild Helljesen
15. Germany – Ina Müller
16. Armenia – Brunette
17. Slovenia – Lorella Flego
18. Georgia – Sopho Khalvashi
19. Switzerland – Jennifer Bosshard
20. Moldova – Doina Stimpovschi
21. Greece – Helena Paparizou
22. Estonia – Birgit
23. Netherlands – None (Note: Nikkie de Jager was supposed to announce the jury points from the Netherlands, but withdrew after the disqualification of the Dutch entry from the final. The contest's executive supervisor Martin Österdahl announced the Dutch jury points instead.)
24. Austria – Philipp Hansa
25. France – Natasha St-Pier
26. Italy – Mario Acampa
27. Finland – Toni Laaksonen
28. Portugal – Mimicat
29. Belgium – Livia Dushkoff
30. Iceland – Friðrik Ómar Hjörleifsson
31. Latvia – Andrejs Reinis Zitmanis
32. Ireland – Paul Harrington
33. Poland – Viki Gabor
34. Cyprus – Loukas Hamatsos
35. Lithuania – Monika Linkytė
36. Serbia – Konstrakta
37. Sweden – Frans

== Detailed voting results ==
=== Semi-final 1 ===
The ten qualifiers from the first semi-final were determined solely by televoting. All fifteen countries competing in the first semi-final voted, alongside Germany, Sweden, the United Kingdom, and the aggregated Rest of the World vote. The ten qualifying countries were announced in no particular order, and the full results were published after the final was held.

Qualifiers

Detailed voting results of the first semi-final of the Eurovision Song Contest 2024
Voting procedure used: 100% Televoting		Total score	Cyprus	Serbia	Lithuania	Ireland	Ukraine	Poland	Croatia	Iceland	Slovenia	Finland	Moldova	Azerbaijan	Australia	Portugal	Luxembourg	Germany	Sweden	United Kingdom	Rest of the World
Contestants	Cyprus	67		4		1			4	4	7	2	12	12	7	8	4		1	1	
Contestants	Serbia	47	5						12		10			5		1	5	5			4
Contestants	Lithuania	119	10	2		12	10	7	3	7	6	7	2	3	6	4	10	8	5	12	5
Contestants	Ireland	124	6	7	8		8	8	6	3	4	8	5	6	10	7	6	6	6	10	10
Contestants	Ukraine	173	12	6	12	8		12	8	10	8	10	10	10	8	12	8	10	10	7	12
Contestants	Poland	35			4	7	3			8	1				1			2	3	6	
Contestants	Croatia	177	7	12	10	10	12	10		12	12	12	8	7	12	6	7	12	12	8	8
Contestants	Iceland	3	1																2		
Contestants	Slovenia	51	2	10	3			4	10			3	4	1	3	3	1				7
Contestants	Finland	59			6	5	6	5	5	6	3				5		2	3	8	4	1
Contestants	Moldova	20	3	3		2	4		1					2		5					
Contestants	Azerbaijan	11		1	1		1	1				1	6								
Contestants	Australia	41			2	4	5	2		2		5	1			2	3	4	4	5	2
Contestants	Portugal	58	4	5	5	3	2	3	2	1	2	4	3	4	2		12	1		2	3
Contestants	Luxembourg	117	8	8	7	6	7	6	7	5	5	6	7	8	4	10		7	7	3	6

==== 12 points ====
Below is a summary of all 12 points received in the first semi-final. Croatia received the maximum score of 12 points from eight countries, while Ukraine received five sets of 12 points. Both Lithuania and Cyprus received two sets of 12 points, while Portugal and Serbia received one each.

12 points awarded in the first semi-final of the Eurovision Song Contest 2024
#	Recipient	Countries giving 12 points
8	Croatia	Australia, Finland, Germany, Iceland, Serbia, Slovenia, Sweden, Ukraine
5	Ukraine	Cyprus, Lithuania, Poland, Portugal, Rest of the World
2	Lithuania	Ireland, United Kingdom
2	Cyprus	Azerbaijan, Moldova
1	Portugal	Luxembourg
1	Serbia	Croatia

=== Semi-final 2 ===
The ten qualifiers from the second semi-final were determined solely by televoting, with the exception of San Marino which was unable to provide a valid televote result and thus used the votes of its backup jury. All sixteen countries competing in the second semi-final voted, alongside France, Italy, Spain, and the aggregated Rest of the World vote. The ten qualifying countries were announced in no particular order, and the full results of how each country voted were published after the final was held.

Qualifiers

Detailed voting results of the second semi-final of the Eurovision Song Contest 2024
Voting procedure used: 100% Televoting 100% Jury vote		Total score	Malta	Albania	Greece	Switzerland	Czechia	Austria	Denmark	Armenia	Latvia	San Marino	Georgia	Belgium	Estonia	Israel	Norway	Netherlands	France	Italy	Spain	Rest of the World
Contestants	Malta	13			3					5		4							1			
Contestants	Albania	14			5	3						2								4		
Contestants	Greece	86	6	8		8	4	2	2	12			6	8		3	1	6	4	6	5	5
Contestants	Switzerland	132	8	5	7		8	8	6	7	7	12	5	7	7	4	7	8	8	8	4	6
Contestants	Czechia	38	2					5	1	1	3	6	4		2	5	3	1		2	2	1
Contestants	Austria	46	3	4	4	4	2		3	4	2		1	1	3	8	2	2			3	
Contestants	Denmark	36	1			2		3		3	4	7			5	1	10					
Contestants	Armenia	137	5	6	8	6	7	6	5		5	8	12	6	4	12	5	10	10	7	7	8
Contestants	Latvia	72	7			7	5	4	7			3	7	5	12		6	3			6	
Contestants	San Marino	16											3							1	10	2
Contestants	Georgia	54	4	7	6		1	1		10				2	1	6			6	5	1	4
Contestants	Belgium	18		2	1						1		2			2		5	5			
Contestants	Estonia	79		3	2	5	6	7	4	2	12	1		4		10	4	7	2	3		7
Contestants	Israel	194	10	12	10	12	12	10	12	6	10		10	10	8		12	12	12	12	12	12
Contestants	Norway	43		1		1	3		8		6	5		3	6			4	3			3
Contestants	Netherlands	182	12	10	12	10	10	12	10	8	8	10	8	12	10	7	8		7	10	8	10

==== 12 points ====
Below is a summary of all 12 points received in the second semi-final. Israel received the maximum score of 12 points from ten countries, followed by the Netherlands which received four sets of 12 points. Armenia received two sets of 12 points, and Switzerland, Greece and Latvia were each awarded one set of 12 points.

12 points awarded in the second semi-final of the Eurovision Song Contest 2024
#	Recipient	Countries giving 12 points
10	Israel	Albania, Czechia, Denmark, France, Italy, Netherlands, Norway, Rest of the World, Spain, Switzerland
4	Netherlands	Austria, Belgium, Greece, Malta
2	Armenia	Georgia, Israel
1	Switzerland	San Marino
1	Greece	Armenia
1	Latvia	Estonia
1	Estonia	Latvia

=== Final ===
The results of the final were determined by televoting and jury voting in all thirty-seven participating countries, plus the Rest of the World aggregate public vote. The announcement of the jury points was conducted by each country individually, with the country's spokesperson announcing their jury's favorite entry that received 12 points, with the remaining points shown on screen. Following the completion of the jury points announcement, the public points were announced as an aggregate by the contest hosts in ascending order starting from the country which received the fewest points from the jury.

Winner
Disqualified

Split results
Place	Combined		Jury		Televoting	
Place	Country	Points	Country	Points	Country	Points
1	Switzerland	591	Switzerland	365	Croatia	337
2	Croatia	547	France	218	Israel	323
3	Ukraine	453	Croatia	210	Ukraine	307
4	France	445	Italy	164	France	227
5	Israel	375	Ukraine	146	Switzerland	226
6	Ireland	278	Ireland	142	Ireland	136
7	Italy	268	Portugal	139	Italy	104
8	Armenia	183	Sweden	125	Greece	85
9	Sweden	174	Armenia	101	Armenia	82
10	Portugal	152	Germany	99	Lithuania	58
11	Greece	126	Luxembourg	83	Sweden	49
12	Germany	117	Israel	52	Cyprus	44
13	Luxembourg	103	United Kingdom	46	Estonia	33
14	Lithuania	90	Greece	41	Serbia	32
15	Cyprus	78	Latvia	36	Finland	31
16	Latvia	64	Cyprus	34	Latvia	28
17	Serbia	54	Lithuania	32	Luxembourg	20
18	United Kingdom	46	Serbia	22	Georgia	19
19	Finland	38	Spain	19 (Note: Despite finishing with the same number of points as Austria, Spain is deemed to have finished 19th in the jury voting due to receiving points from more countries)	Germany	18
20	Estonia	37	Austria	19	Portugal	13
21	Georgia	34	Georgia	15 (Note: Despite finishing with the same number of points as Slovenia, Georgia is deemed to have finished 21st in the jury voting due to receiving points from more countries)	Slovenia	12
22	Spain	30	Slovenia	15	Spain	11
23	Slovenia	27	Norway	12	Austria	5
24	Austria	24	Finland	7	Norway	4
25	Norway	16	Estonia	4	United Kingdom	0
—	Netherlands	—	Netherlands	—	Netherlands	—

Detailed jury voting results of the final of the Eurovision Song Contest 2024
Voting procedure used: 100% Televoting; 100% Jury vote		Total score	Jury vote score	Televoting score	Jury vote																																				
Voting procedure used: 100% Televoting; 100% Jury vote		Total score	Jury vote score	Televoting score	Ukraine	United Kingdom	Luxembourg	Azerbaijan	San Marino	Malta	Croatia	Albania	Czechia	Israel	Australia	Denmark	Spain	Norway	Germany	Armenia	Slovenia	Georgia	Switzerland	Moldova	Greece	Estonia	Netherlands	Austria	France	Italy	Finland	Portugal	Belgium	Iceland	Latvia	Ireland	Poland	Cyprus	Lithuania	Serbia	Sweden
Contestants	Sweden	174	125	49	8	6	1	5	2		2		8		5	5	8	3	12					1	1	6				6	7	3	3	1	5	10	5	2	5	5	
Contestants	Ukraine	453	146	307			5	1			7		12	8	1	6		4	4			5	2	12	2	10	2	6	10		8	6	1	3	8	2	10	1	6	1	3
Contestants	Germany	117	99	18	7	2	4		1				5	10			5	6		1		2			5	4	5		8	4	3	2	8	2	4	6	4		1		
Contestants	Luxembourg	103	83	20	1	4		8		4	5	4		12	2	1			3		5			2	3				7		4					8		4			6
Contestants	Israel	375	52	323						3								8	8			3		3		5			3				5		2			8	4		
Contestants	Lithuania	90	32	58	5														1					5		2	4		1			7								7	
Contestants	Spain	30	19	11					6														1					4		7	1										
Contestants	Estonia	37	4	33																								2		2											
Contestants	Ireland	278	142	136	10	7		10	7	7	8		7		12	7	10				1		10					3		10	6	10	4	7			1		3	2	
Contestants	Latvia	64	36	28		3	8			5						4	4					8				1	1										2				
Contestants	Greece	126	41	85								7						2		4	2		12						4									7		3	
Contestants	United Kingdom	46	46	0											4		2						3									4	6	8	3	4				4	8
Contestants	Norway	16	12	4								6	1															1			2								2		
Contestants	Italy	268	164	104	2	5		6	10	8	6	10		6	7		1	5	2	8	3	7	6	10	8	3	6	10				5	7				7	3		6	7
Contestants	Serbia	54	22	32							3	1				2				5	4											1				1		5			
Contestants	Finland	38	7	31					4						3																										
Contestants	Portugal	152	139	13	3	12	3		5	1	12	5	3	3			3			10	8	4	7	4	6		8		12				2	4	1	5	6		8		4
Contestants	Armenia	183	101	82			2		8			8	6			3		7	7		7	6	4		4		3	7	6	3		8		5	7						
Contestants	Cyprus	78	34	44		1	7	2	3		1				6					2					10																2
Contestants	Switzerland	591	365	226	12	10	12	12	12	12		12	10	5	10	12	12	12	5	7	10	12		7	12	12	12	12	5	12	12	12	10	6	12	12	12	6	12	10	12
Contestants	Slovenia	27	15	12				3			10	2																													
Contestants	Croatia	547	210	337	4	8	6	4		10		3	2	4	8	8			6	6	6	1	8	8		8	7	8	2	8	10			10	6	7	8	12	10	12	10
Contestants	Georgia	34	15	19				7		2				2				1		3																					
Contestants	France	445	218	227	6		10			6	4		4	1		10	7	10	10	12	12	10	5	6	7	7	10	5		1	5		12	12	10	3	3	10	7	8	5
Contestants	Austria	24	19	5										7			6													5											1

Detailed televoting results of the final of the Eurovision Song Contest 2024
Voting procedure used: 100% Televoting 100% Jury vote		Total score	Jury vote score	Televoting score	Televote																																					
Voting procedure used: 100% Televoting 100% Jury vote		Total score	Jury vote score	Televoting score	Ukraine	United Kingdom	Luxembourg	Azerbaijan	San Marino	Malta	Croatia	Albania	Czechia	Israel	Australia	Denmark	Spain	Norway	Germany	Armenia	Slovenia	Georgia	Switzerland	Moldova	Greece	Estonia	Netherlands	Austria	France	Italy	Finland	Portugal	Belgium	Iceland	Latvia	Ireland	Poland	Cyprus	Lithuania	Serbia	Sweden	Rest of the World
Contestants	Sweden	174	125	49						1	2		3			6		10			1			8	1	1								7			2	1	1	5		
Contestants	Ukraine	453	146	307		6	7	8	10	12	8	7	12	10	6	10	10	8	8	3	8	12	6	12	3	12	8	7	8	10	6	10	7	5	10	8	12	8	12		8	10
Contestants	Germany	117	99	18			1							8									3					4						2								
Contestants	Luxembourg	103	83	20										12															3				1									4
Contestants	Israel	375	52	323		12	12	7	12	5		10	10		12	8	12	5	12	1	10	8	12	10	7	6	12	10	12	12	12	12	12	8	7	10	5	10	3	3	12	12
Contestants	Lithuania	90	32	58	7	8	4		1				1			1	1	3	2							4	1							4	8	7	3				3	
Contestants	Spain	30	19	11																									2	1	3	3				2						
Contestants	Estonia	37	4	33	4						4																				7				12				6			
Contestants	Ireland	278	142	136	8	10		4	2	4	5		6		8	3	7	4	1	2	2	4		2	2	2	6	2		3	5	5	2	3	3		6	2	5	7	4	7
Contestants	Latvia	64	36	28	5	4										4		2				1				3										5			4			
Contestants	Greece	126	41	85		1	5	1	7	2		4	2		3		2		5	10		2	4	3			4		1	2			4					12		8		3
Contestants	United Kingdom	46	46	0																																						
Contestants	Norway	16	12	4	3																										1											
Contestants	Italy	268	164	104			3	3	3	8	7	8		7			4		3	6	3	3	8	4	4		2	1	4			4	3			1	4	3	2	4	1	1
Contestants	Serbia	54	22	32						3	12	2									5		5					5														
Contestants	Finland	38	7	31	2	3									4	2		1								8								1	1	3	1				5	
Contestants	Portugal	152	139	13			6																2						5													
Contestants	Armenia	183	101	82	1						3	1	5	6	1		3		4			10	1	1	5		3	3	10	4		2	5		2			4		1	2	5
Contestants	Cyprus	78	34	44				6	4			5		1	5					4	6				12							1										
Contestants	Switzerland	591	365	226	12	5	2	10	5	6	1	3	7		7	5	6	6	7	8	4	7		5	8	7	7	8	6	7	8	6	6	6	4	6	8	6	8	6	7	6
Contestants	Slovenia	27	15	12							10																													2		
Contestants	Croatia	547	210	337	10	7	10	12	8	10		12	8	5	10	12	8	12	10	7	12	5	10	7	6	10	10	12	7	8	10	7	8	12	5	12	10	5	10	12	10	8
Contestants	Georgia	34	15	19				5						4						5										5												
Contestants	France	445	218	227	6	2	8	2	6	7	6	6	4	2	2	7	5	7	6	12	7	6	7	6	10	5	5	6		6	4	8	10	10	6	4	7	7	7	10	6	2
Contestants	Austria	24	19	5										3																	2											

==== 12 points ====
Below is a summary of all 12 points received in the final. In the jury vote, Switzerland received the maximum score from twenty-two countries, followed by France and Portugal with four and three sets of 12 points, respectively. Croatia and Ukraine received two sets of 12 points, and Croatia, Greece, Ireland, Luxembourg, and Sweden were each awarded one set of 12 points. In the public vote, Israel received the maximum score of 12 points from fourteen countries and the Rest of the World vote, followed by Croatia with nine sets of 12 points, and Ukraine with seven. Cyprus, Estonia, France, Greece, Luxembourg, Serbia, and Switzerland were each awarded one set of 12 points.

12 points awarded by juries in the final of the Eurovision Song Contest 2024
#	Recipient	Countries giving 12 points
22	Switzerland	Albania, Austria, Azerbaijan, Denmark, Estonia, Finland, Georgia, Greece, Ireland, Italy, Latvia, Lithuania, Luxembourg, Malta, Netherlands, Norway, Poland, Portugal, San Marino, Spain, Sweden, Ukraine
4	France	Armenia, Belgium, Iceland, Slovenia
3	Portugal	Croatia, France, United Kingdom
2	Croatia	Cyprus, Serbia
2	Ukraine	Czechia, Moldova
1	Greece	Switzerland
1	Ireland	Australia
1	Luxembourg	Israel
1	Sweden	Germany

12 points awarded by televoting in the final of the Eurovision Song Contest 2024
#	Recipient	Countries giving 12 points
15	Israel	Australia, Belgium, Finland, France, Germany, Italy, Luxembourg, Netherlands, Portugal, Rest of the World, San Marino, Spain, Sweden, Switzerland, United Kingdom
9	Croatia	Albania, Austria, Azerbaijan, Denmark, Iceland, Ireland, Norway, Serbia, Slovenia
7	Ukraine	Czechia, Estonia, Georgia, Lithuania, Malta, Moldova, Poland
1	Cyprus	Greece
1	Estonia	Latvia
1	France	Armenia
1	Greece	Cyprus
1	Luxembourg	Israel
1	Serbia	Croatia
1	Switzerland	Ukraine

== Broadcasts ==
All participating broadcasters may choose to have on-site or remote commentators providing insight and voting information to their local audience. Although they are required to show the final and semi-final in which their country votes, most broadcasters cover all three shows. Some non-participating broadcasters also air the contest. The Eurovision Song Contest YouTube channel provides international live streams with no commentary of all shows. The table below details the broadcasting plans and commentators for the countries that aired the contest. According to the EBU, in total 163 million people watched at least a minute of the television broadcasts, and 7.3 million people watched the YouTube broadcasts. Votes were received from 156 countries, including the 37 competing countries.

Broadcasters and commentators in participating countries
Country	Broadcaster	Channel(s)	Show(s)	Commentator(s)	Ref(s)
Albania	RTSH	RTSH 1, RTSH Muzikë, Radio Tirana	All shows	Andri Xhahu	
Armenia	AMPTV	Armenia 1	All shows	Hrachuhi Utmazyan and Sevak Hakobyan	
Australia	SBS	SBS	All shows	Myf Warhurst and Joel Creasey	
Austria	ORF	ORF 1	All shows	Andi Knoll	
Austria	ORF	FM4	Final	Jan Böhmermann and Olli Schulz	
Azerbaijan	İTV		All shows	Nurlana Jafarova	
Belgium	RTBF	Tipik	SF1	French: Maureen Louys and Jean-Louis Lahaye	
Belgium	RTBF	La Une	SF2, final	French: Maureen Louys and Jean-Louis Lahaye	
Belgium	RTBF	VivaCité	Final	French: Maureen Louys and Jean-Louis Lahaye	
Belgium	VRT	VRT 1	All shows	Dutch: Peter Van de Veire	
Belgium	VRT	Radio 2	Final	Dutch: Peter Van de Veire	
Croatia	HRT	HRT 1	All shows	Duško Ćurlić	
Croatia	HRT	HR 2	All shows	Zlatko Turkalj	
Cyprus	CyBC	RIK 1, RIK Sat	All shows	Melina Karageorgiou and Hovig Demirjian	
Cyprus	CyBC	RIK Trito	All shows	Unknown	
Czechia	ČT	ČT2	All shows	Vašek Matějovský, Patricie Kaňok Fuxová and Dominika Hašková	
Denmark	DR	DR1	All shows	Ole Tøpholm	
Estonia	ERR	ETV	All shows	Estonian: Marko Reikop	
Estonia	ERR	ETV+	All shows	Russian: Aleksandr Hobotov and Julia Kalenda	
Estonia	ERR	ETV2	All shows	Estonian Sign Language: various interpreters	
Finland	Yle	Yle TV1, TV Finland	All shows	Finnish: Mikko Silvennoinen; Swedish: Eva Frantz and Johan Lindroos	
Finland	Yle	Yle Radio Suomi	All shows	Finnish: Toni Laaksonen and Sanna Pirkkalainen	
Finland	Yle	Yle X3M	All shows	Swedish: Eva Frantz and Johan Lindroos	
Finland	Yle	Yle Areena (Note: Including Finnish- and Swedish-language commentary options from Yle TV1)	All shows	Inari Sámi: Heli Huovinen and Northern Sámi: Aslak Paltto	
Finland	Yle	Yle Areena	SF1, final	Russian: Levan Tvaltvadze	
France	France Télévisions	Culturebox	Semi-finals	Nicky Doll	
France	France Télévisions	France 2	Final	Stéphane Bern and Laurence Boccolini	
Georgia	GPB	1TV	All shows	Nika Lobiladze	
Germany	ARD/NDR	One	Semi-finals	Thorsten Schorn	
Germany	ARD/NDR	Das Erste	Final	Thorsten Schorn	
Germany	RBB	Radio Eins	Final	Amelie Ernst and Max Spallek	
Greece	ERT	ERT1	All shows	Thanasis Alevras and Jérôme Kaluta	
Greece	ERT	Deftero Programma	All shows	Dimitris Meidanis	
Iceland	RÚV	RÚV	All shows	Guðrún Dís Emilsdóttir	
Iceland	RÚV	RÚV 2	All shows	Icelandic Sign Language: various interpreters	
Iceland	RÚV	Rás 2	SF1, final	Guðrún Dís Emilsdóttir	
Ireland	RTÉ	RTÉ One	SF1, final	Marty Whelan	
Ireland	RTÉ	RTÉ2	SF2	Marty Whelan	
Ireland	RTÉ	RTÉ 2fm	SF1, final	Zbyszek Zalinski and Neil Doherty	
Israel	IPBC	Kan 11	Semi-finals	Asaf Liberman and Akiva Novick	
Israel	IPBC	Kan 11	Final	Asaf Liberman, Akiva Novick and Yoav Tzafir	
Israel	IPBC	Kan 88, Kan Tarbut, Kan Bet	Final	Unknown	
Italy	RAI	Rai 2	Semi-finals	Gabriele Corsi and Mara Maionchi	
Italy	RAI	Rai 1	Final	Gabriele Corsi and Mara Maionchi	
Italy	RAI	Rai Radio 2	All shows	Diletta Parlangeli and Matteo Osso	
Latvia	LTV	LTV1	Semi-finals	Toms Grēviņš	
Latvia	LTV	LTV1	Final	Toms Grēviņš and Lauris Reiniks	
Lithuania	LRT	LRT TV, LRT Radijas	All shows	Ramūnas Zilnys	
Luxembourg	RTL	RTL, RTL Radio	All shows	Luxembourgish: Raoul Roos and Roger Saurfeld	
Luxembourg	RTL	RTL Today	All shows	English: Sarah Tapp and Meredith Moss	
Luxembourg	RTL	RTL Infos	SF1, final	French: Jerôme Didelot and Emma Sorgato	
Malta	PBS	TVM	All shows	No commentary	
Moldova	TRM	Moldova 1, Radio Moldova	All shows	Ion Jalbă and Elena Stegari	
Netherlands	AVROTROS	NPO 1, BVN	All shows	Cornald Maas and Jacqueline Govaert	
Netherlands	AVROTROS	NPO Radio 2	Final	Splinter Chabot and Carolien Borgers	
Norway	NRK	NRK1	All shows	Marte Stokstad	
Norway	NRK	NRK P1	Final	Jon Marius Hyttebakk	
Poland	TVP	TVP1, TVP Polonia	All shows	Artur Orzech	
Portugal	RTP	RTP1, RTP Internacional	All shows (Note: The broadcast of the second semi-final started delayed, at 22:30 WEST)	José Carlos Malato and Nuno Galopim	
Portugal	RTP	RTP África	SF1, final (Note: The broadcast of the final started delayed, at 21:01 WEST)	José Carlos Malato and Nuno Galopim	
San Marino	SMRTV	San Marino RTV	All shows	Lia Fiorio and Gigi Restivo	
Serbia	RTS	RTS1, (Note: During the performance of Poland in the first semi-final, the broadcast was temporarily moved from RTS1 to RTS2, so the former could air the arrival ceremony of General Secretary of the Chinese Communist Party Xi Jinping, who was conducting a state visit to Serbia. RTS2 aired approximately 25 minutes of the semi-final, including the remainder of the Polish entry, performances from Iceland, Croatia, and the first part of the German performance, before the broadcast was restored to RTS1.) RTS Svet	All shows	Duška Vučinić	
Serbia	RTS	Radio Beograd 1	SF1	Katarina Epstein	
Serbia	RTS	Radio Beograd 1	Final	Katarina Epstein and Nikoleta Dojčinović	
Slovenia	RTVSLO	TV SLO 1	SF1, final	Mojca Mavec	
Slovenia	RTVSLO	TV SLO 2	SF2	Mojca Mavec	
Slovenia	RTVSLO	Radio Val 202	SF1, final	Maj Valerij and Igor Bračič	
Spain	RTVE	La 2	SF1	Spanish: Julia Varela and Tony Aguilar	
Spain	RTVE	La 1	SF2	Spanish: Julia Varela and Tony Aguilar	
Spain	RTVE	La 1	Final	Spanish: Julia Varela and Tony Aguilar; Catalan: (Note: Catalan-language commentary option available only in Catalonia.) Sònia Urbano and Xavi Martínez	
Spain	RTVE	TVE Internacional	All shows	Spanish: Julia Varela and Tony Aguilar	
Spain	RTVE	Radio Nacional	Final	Spanish: David Asensio, Sara Calvo, Ángela Fernández, Manu Martín-Albo and Luis Miguel Montes	
Spain	RTVE	Ràdio 4	Final	Catalan: Sònia Urbano and Xavi Martínez	
Sweden	SVT	SVT1	All shows	Swedish: Tina Mehrafzoon and Edward af Sillén	
Sweden	SVT	SVT Play (Note: Including Swedish-language commentary option from SVT1 for all shows)	Final	Inari Sámi: Heli Huovinen and Northern Sámi: Aslak Paltto (Note: In simulcast of broadcast from Finland's Yle Areena)	
Sweden	SR	SR P4	All shows	Swedish: Carolina Norén	
Switzerland	SRG SSR	RSI La 2	Semi-finals	Italian: Ellis Cavallini and Gian-Andrea Costa	
Switzerland	SRG SSR	RSI La 1	Final	Italian: Ellis Cavallini and Gian-Andrea Costa	
Switzerland	SRG SSR	RTS 2	Semi-finals	French: Jean-Marc Richard and Nicolas Tanner	
Switzerland	SRG SSR	RTS 1	Final	French: Jean-Marc Richard, Nicolas Tanner and Julie Berthollet	
Switzerland	SRG SSR	SRF zwei	Semi-finals	German: Sven Epiney	
Switzerland	SRG SSR	SRF 1	Final	German: Sven Epiney	
Ukraine	Suspilne	Suspilne Kultura	Semi-finals	Ukrainian: Timur Miroshnychenko	
Ukraine	Suspilne	Suspilne Kultura	Final	Ukrainian: Timur Miroshnychenko and Vasyl Baidak	
Ukraine	Suspilne	Suspilne Kultura	All shows	Ukrainian Sign Language: Tetiana Zhurkova, Inna Petrova, Iryna Skolotova, Yuliia Porplik, Anfisa Boldusieva and Lada Sokoliuk	
Ukraine	Suspilne	Radio Promin	All shows	Dmytro Zakharchenko and Lesia Antypenko (Note: The broadcast of the semi-finals mostly featured TV commentary by Miroshnychenko. Only the second recaps (which Miroshnychenko left unnarrated on TV) were commentated on by Zakharchenko and Antypenko. The broadcasts also included brief studio discussions and brief on-site reports by Anna Zakletska between the close of the voting window and results announcements, which were presented by Zakharchenko and Antypenko.)	
United Kingdom	BBC	BBC One	Semi-finals	Scott Mills and Rylan Clark	
United Kingdom	BBC	BBC One	Final	Graham Norton	
United Kingdom	BBC	BBC Red Button	All shows	British Sign Language: various interpreters	
United Kingdom	BBC	BBC Radio 2	Semi-finals	Richie Anderson	
United Kingdom	BBC	BBC Radio 2	Final	Scott Mills and Rylan Clark	

Broadcasters and commentators in non-participating countries and territories
Country/Territory	Broadcaster	Channel(s)	Show(s)	Commentator(s)	Ref(s)
Brazil	Zapping	Zapping Music Live	Final	Priscila Bertozzi	
Chile	Zapping	Zapping Channel	Final	Rayén Araya and Ignacio Lira	
Kosovo	RTK	RTK 1, Radio Kosovo 2	All shows	Agron Krasniqi and Egzona Rafuna	
Montenegro	RTCG	TVCG 1	All shows	Ivan Maksimović	
Montenegro	RTCG	Radio 98	All shows	Unknown	
North Macedonia	MRT	MRT 1, Radio Skopje	All shows	Aleksandra Jovanovska	
Peru	Zapping	Zapping Music Live	Final	Rayén Araya and Ignacio Lira	
Slovakia	RTVS	Rádio FM	Final	Daniel Baláž, Lucia Haverlík, Pavol Hubinák and Juraj Malíček	
United States	NBC	Peacock	All shows	No commentator	
United States	WJFD-FM		Final	Ewan Spence and Samantha Ross	

== Other awards ==
In addition to the main winner's trophy, the Marcel Bezençon Awards and the You're a Vision Award were contested during the Eurovision Song Contest 2024. The OGAE (General Organisation of Eurovision Fans) voting poll also took place before the contest. Eurovision Awards, an end-of-year poll conducted by the contest's official site, returned for a fourth year with the results determined across 12 categories.

=== Marcel Bezençon Awards ===
The Marcel Bezençon Awards, organised since 2002 by Sweden's then-head of delegation and 1992 representative Christer Björkman, and winner of the 1984 contest Richard Herrey, honours songs in the contest's final. The awards are divided into three categories: the Artistic Award, the Composers Award, and the Media Award. The winners were revealed shortly before the Eurovision final on 11 May.

Category	Country	Song	Artist	Songwriter(s)
Artistic Award	Switzerland	"The Code"	Nemo	Benjamin Alasu; Lasse Midtsian Nymann; Linda Dale; Nemo Mettler
Composers Award	Switzerland	"The Code"	Nemo	Benjamin Alasu; Lasse Midtsian Nymann; Linda Dale; Nemo Mettler
Media Award	Croatia	"Rim Tim Tagi Dim"	Baby Lasagna	Marko Purišić

=== OGAE ===
OGAE, an organisation of over forty Eurovision Song Contest fan clubs across Europe and beyond, conducts an annual voting poll first held in 2002 as the Marcel Bezençon Fan Award. After all votes were cast, the top-ranked entry in the 2024 poll was Croatia's "Rim Tim Tagi Dim" performed by Baby Lasagna; the top five results are shown below.

Country	Song	Artist	Points
Croatia	"Rim Tim Tagi Dim"	Baby Lasagna	356
Italy	"La noia"	Angelina Mango	338
Switzerland	"The Code"	Nemo	290
Belgium	"Before the Party's Over"	Mustii	223
France	"Mon amour"	Slimane	188

=== You're a Vision Award ===
The You're a Vision Award (a word play of "Eurovision"), established in 2022 by the fansite Songfestival.be following the cancellation of the Barbara Dex Award due to its associated negative connotations, aims to "celebrate the creativity and diversity that embody the Eurovision spirit", with the winner being the one with the most notable outfit. Croatia's Baby Lasagna won the 2024 award, with Ireland's Bambie Thug and the Netherlands' Joost Klein completing the top three.

Place	Country	Artist
1	Croatia	Baby Lasagna
2	Ireland	Bambie Thug
3	Netherlands	Joost Klein

== Incidents and controversies ==
The 2024 contest was described by several publications as one of the most controversial editions in the contest's history, (Note: Attributed to multiple references:) with Scottish newspaper The National writing, "it is very clear that, in the words of winner Nemo themself after their win, 'maybe Eurovision needs a little bit of fixing'."

=== Israeli participation ===
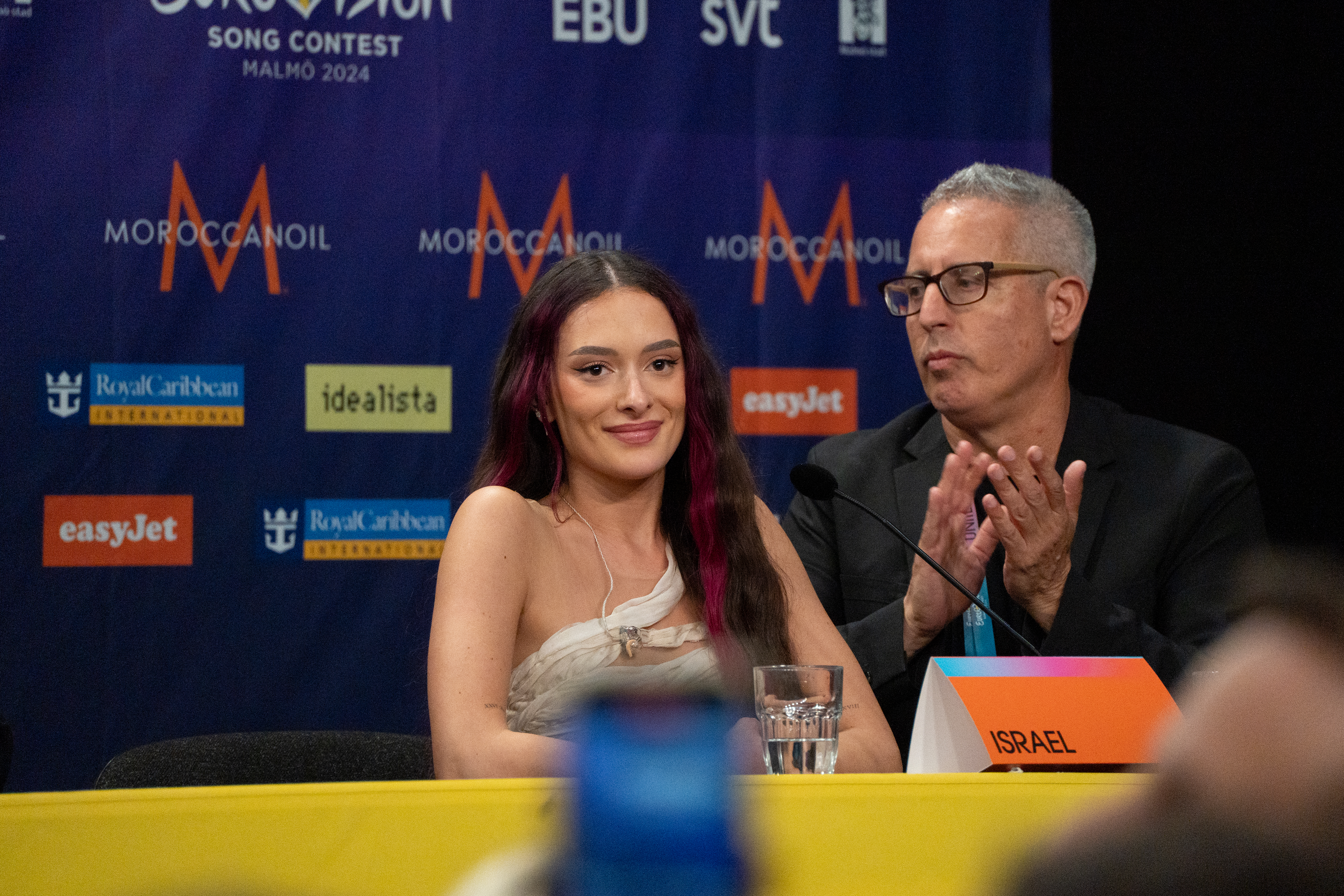
The Israeli entrant Eden Golan at the press conference following the second semi-final

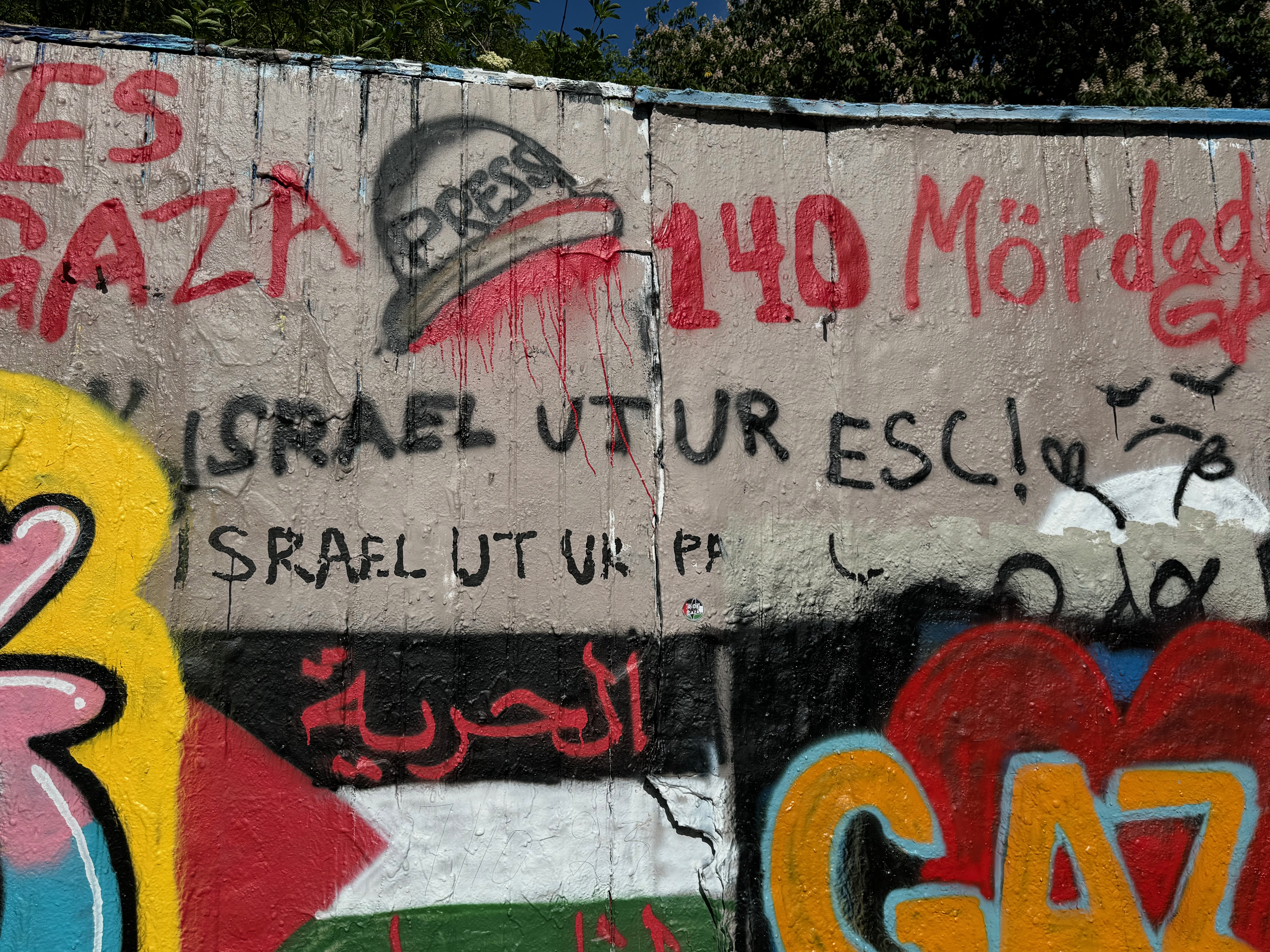
A pro-Palestinian mural protesting Israel's participation at Malmö's Folkets Park

The participation of Israel in the contest became controversial due to the Gaza war. There were calls for Israel to be excluded, and, when the EBU rejected this, various campaigns for participants and viewers to boycott the contest. The Israeli national selection was also controversial, with its chosen entry for the contest ultimately rewritten, as the lyrics of the original version of the song, titled "October Rain", were seen as referencing the 7 October attacks, a breach of political neutrality rules; it was subsequently retitled "Hurricane". Other acts dismissed the idea of boycotting but called for peace in the region. Israel ultimately placed second in the televote and fifth overall in the final, with the former result being partially attributed to a campaign run by the Israeli Ministry of Foreign Affairs to boost public votes.

=== Onstage display of pro-Palestinian gestures ===
Before the first semi-final, Ireland's entrant Bambie Thug was asked to replace Ogham-script text written on their body that read 'ceasefire' and 'freedom for Palestine'; they were subsequently changed to 'crown the witch'. During the opening act of the first semi-final, Eric Saade, whose father is Palestinian, performed wearing a keffiyeh. The EBU stated that his keffiyeh was a political symbol and that it regretted Saade's choice to "compromise the non-political nature of the event".

During the final, the Portuguese entrant Iolanda wore nail art featuring Palestinian symbols, and said "peace will prevail" at the end of her performance. The Portuguese delegation later claimed that the EBU did not upload Iolanda's performance in the final to its platforms, opting to use the semi-final performance instead, due to this. The Portuguese broadcaster RTP issued a complaint to the EBU, and Iolanda's performance in the final was uploaded later during the show. The EBU stated that technical difficulties were the reason for the semi-final performance being initially uploaded instead of the final performance.

=== Misconduct allegations ===
Shortly after the first semi-final, an official complaint was lodged with the EBU regarding claims that members of Israeli fan clubs, two of which were officially associated with the EBU, "[harassed] the Irish delegation at the EuroClub nightclub." Unverified videos and claims were posted online purporting to show "Israeli delegates and journalists harassing other media and delegations", and a Spanish reporter was allegedly harassed by Israeli media after shouting a pro-Palestinian slogan, prompting the Spanish broadcaster RTVE to request the EBU to "ensure freedom of press and opinion." The artists representing Ireland (Bambie Thug), Switzerland (Nemo), and Greece (Marina Satti) were all absent from the flag parade of the third dress rehearsal for the final, held the afternoon before the live show. Bambie Thug stated that they were absent due to "a situation [...] which [they] felt needed urgent attention from the EBU". The Dutch broadcaster AVROTROS issued two complaints to the EBU regarding an "unsafe environment in the arena". No action was taken on the complaints during the contest. According to a report by Norwegian newspaper VG, Greece, Ireland, Norway, Portugal, Switzerland, and the United Kingdom all considered withdrawing from the final, before reaching an agreement with the EBU 25 minutes prior to the start of the show; Greek broadcaster ERT, head of the Swiss delegation Yves Schifferle, and Iolanda's management agency denied that the delegations were considering withdrawal, with Schifferle confirming that Nemo themself led the talks with the EBU on behalf of the artists concerned. Magnus Børmark, guitarist for the Norwegian representatives Gåte, also confirmed that there were withdrawal talks.

Following the contest, delegations from Serbia and Slovenia stated that they would prepare complaints to the EBU regarding the behaviour of the Israeli delegation. The Portuguese delegation asked for clarification from the EBU regarding incidents that occurred during the final, supported by delegations from Croatia, France, Norway, and Spain. The Israeli delegation accused other delegations and artists of "immense pressure and an unprecedented display of hatred". The EBU commissioned an independent investigation into the complaints regarding the working atmosphere during the event, and on 1 July 2024, it announced a number of organisational changes. Among these are the creation of a "ESC director" role to oversee the work of executive supervisor Martin Österdahl and the head of brand and commercial, and recommendations for the appointment of a welfare producer and a crisis management team.

=== Claims of audience audio changes ===
Before, during, and after Israel's performances, booing from the audience in the venue was reported. There were claims by fans that the volume of the booing in the broadcasts was lowered by anti-booing technology, and that pre-recorded applauses were played. RTP's director, Nicolau Santos, as well as AVROTROS, supported these claims, and criticised the EBU's usage of the technology. The Slovenian broadcaster RTVSLO also addressed claims of audio distortion. A video posted to social media showed audio of the applause track cutting out and replaying during the announcement of the Dutch jury points. The EBU and SVT denied the allegations of audio censorship, stating that they "do not censor sound from the arena audience. The same principle applies to all competing performances and opening and interval acts." Eden Golan, Israel's representative, claimed in a post-contest interview that anti-booing technology was in place, and that the boos for her were being silenced and turned into cheers. Anti-booing technology was previously used in the 2015 contest.

=== Televoting results ===
At the end of the broadcast of the second semi-final, in which Italy voted, Italian broadcaster RAI displayed what appeared to be the televoting percentages recorded in the country. This contravened the rules of the contest, according to which the detailed results from all shows can only be published after the final. It was later clarified by RAI that the results shown were not complete, but were in fact partial results of the vote. The results from Italy published after the contest were different to the ones aired. Following the contest, RTVSLO called the televoting results into question, citing its doubts in the validity of the Slovenian vote, as well as questioning the introduction of the Rest of the World vote.

=== Disqualification of the Netherlands from the final ===
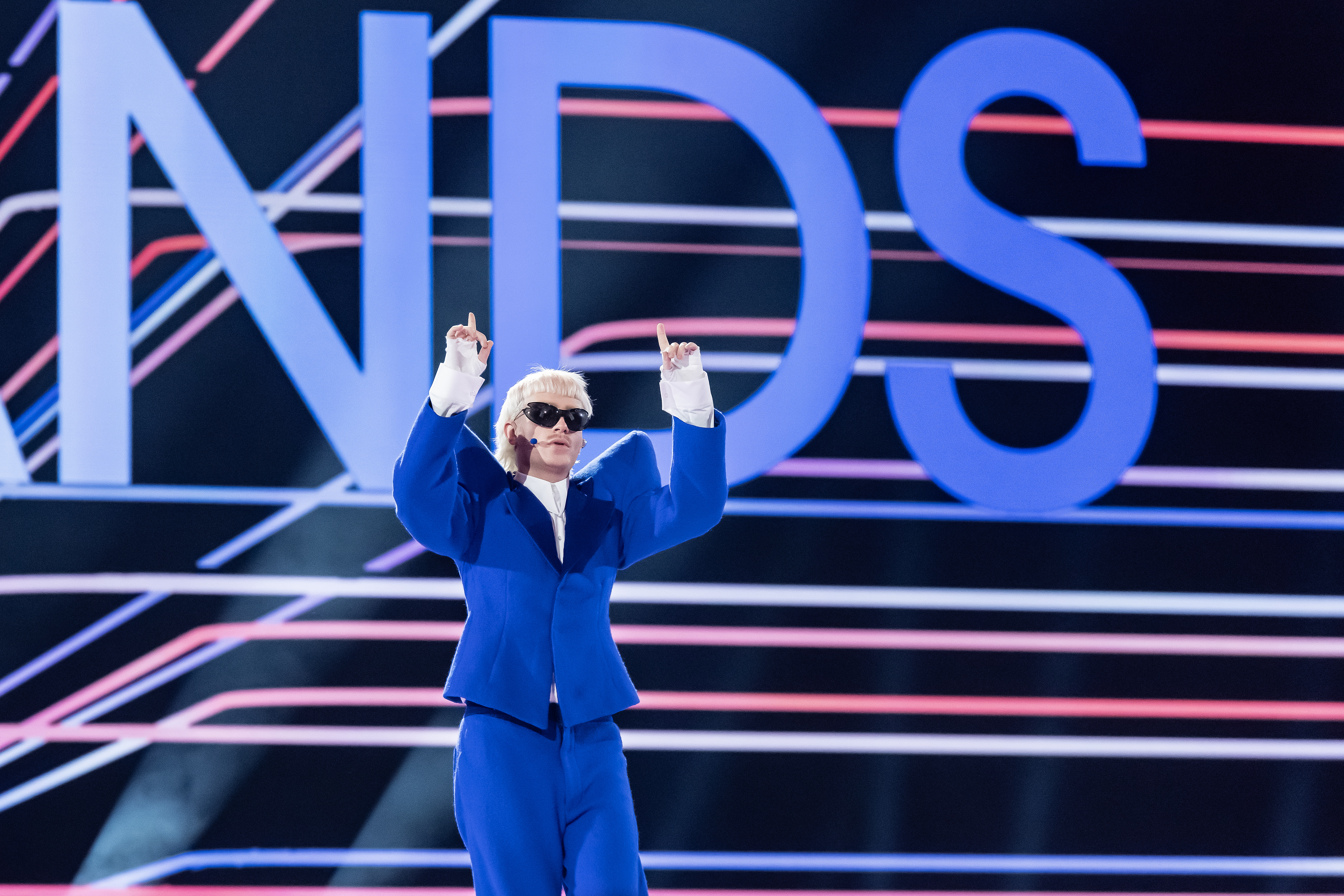
The Dutch entrant Joost Klein at the flag parade during the first dress rehearsal for the final; he was not seen again during the show afterwards.

During the first dress rehearsal for the final, held on 10 May, the Dutch representative Joost Klein did not appear for his performance despite being present during the flag parade. An EBU press release said it was "investigating an incident reported to [it] involving the Dutch artist", as well as that "he [would] not be rehearsing until further notice". He was also not present for the jury show later that evening, and a recording of his performance from the second semi-final was used there instead.

The incident occurred backstage shortly after Klein's performance in the second semi-final, and involved a female camera operator, who filed a complaint against Klein to the Swedish Police Authority. Klein was claimed to have made a threatening gesture toward the operator, following the female camera operator's recording of Klein on his way to the green room; AVROTROS claimed it was agreed he would not be filmed there. Further details of the altercation were unclear at that time, however, the Swedish Police Authority stated that no assault had occurred. AVROTROS and its parent broadcasting organisation NPO held discussions with the EBU, ultimately leading the EBU to disqualify the Dutch entry from the final. This was the first and only time in the contest's history that an entrant was disqualified during the event. AVROTROS called the penalty "very heavy and disproportionate".

The Swedish Police Authority launched an investigation into the incident on the day it was reported, and the case was handed to the Swedish Prosecution Authority following the contest. The investigation was closed on 12 August 2024 due to a lack of evidence to prove that Klein "was capable of causing serious fear or that [he] had any such intention". AVROTROS subsequently offered Klein the opportunity to represent the Netherlands again in the 2025 contest, which he declined.

=== Enforcement of flag policy ===
Swiss winner Nemo claimed in a press conference after their win that the non-binary flag had been banned by the EBU from the venue, accusing the organisers of "double standards" regarding the alleged forcing of fans to dispose of their flags before entering the venue. The singer, who identifies as non-binary and was the first openly non-binary performer to win the contest, admitted to violating this by bringing a non-binary flag in, which they displayed in the green room. The European Commission's vice president, Margaritis Schinas, also claimed on 13 May that the flag of the European Union (EU) was among those not permitted; he later filed a formal complaint to the EBU, after calling it a "gift" for the "enemies of Europe", a month ahead of the 2024 European Parliament election. There were also reports of Dutch flags being confiscated ahead of the final due to Joost Klein's disqualification. The EBU responded by stating that "SVT's policy was to allow the flags of the participating countries and the rainbow flags," that there had not been an express ban on the EU flag in the written policy, and that "due to heightened geopolitical tensions, the flag policy was more rigorously enforced by security at this year's event." It also stated that it would review the flag policy with the Swiss Broadcasting Corporation (SRG SSR), which would host the 2025 contest following Nemo's win.

== Reception ==
Following the 2024 contest, four entries entered the Billboard Global 200 chart dated 25 May 2024: the Netherlands' "Europapa" at number 51, Switzerland's winning entry "The Code" at number 52, Croatia's "Rim Tim Tagi Dim" at number 139, and France's "Mon amour" at number 144. On the Billboard Global Excl. US chart also dated 25 May 2024, the four aforementioned entries entered at numbers 24, 21, 64, and 61, respectively, followed by Italy's "La noia" at number 129 and Ukraine's "Teresa & Maria" at number 130. "La noia" had previously peaked at number 51 on the Global Excl. US chart and at number 110 on the Global 200 chart following its win at the Sanremo Music Festival 2024, which also doubled as the Italian national final.

In a November 2024 press release, Malmö Municipality revealed that the contest generated SEK 445 million from 159,680 visitors, including SEK 3.98 million from ticket sales. In addition, over 90% of city decor for the event were recycled.

== Official album ==
Cover art of the official album

Eurovision Song Contest: Malmö 2024 is the official compilation album of the contest, featuring all 37 entries. It was put together by the European Broadcasting Union and was released by Universal Music Group digitally on 12 April 2024, in CD format on 19 April 2024, and in vinyl format on 24 May 2024.

=== Charts ===
==== Weekly charts ====
Weekly chart performance for Eurovision Song Contest: Malmö 2024
Chart (2024)	Peak position
Australian Albums (ARIA)	22
Belgian Compilation Albums (Ultratop 50 Flanders)	1
Belgian Compilation Albums (Ultratop 50 Wallonia)	1
Croatian International Albums (HDU)	7
Czech Albums (ČNS IFPI)	6
Danish Compilation Albums (Tracklisten)	7
Dutch Compilation Albums (Compilation Top 30)	1
Finnish Physical Albums (Suomen virallinen lista)	8
German Compilation Albums (Offizielle Top 100)	1
Greek Albums (IFPI)	9
Irish Compilation Albums (IRMA)	1
Italian Physical Albums (FIMI)	20
Polish Physical Albums (ZPAV)	32
Slovak Albums (ČNS IFPI)	15
Swedish Physical Albums (Sverigetopplistan)	3
Swiss Compilation Albums (Swiss Hitparade)	1
UK Compilation Albums (Official Charts)	1
US Top Compilation Albums (Billboard)	7

==== Monthly charts ====
Monthly chart performance for Eurovision Song Contest: Malmö 2024
Chart (2024)	Peak position
Czech Albums (ČNS IFPI)	26
Slovak Albums (ČNS IFPI)	46

==== Year-end charts ====
Year-end chart performance for Eurovision Song Contest: Malmö 2024
Chart (2024)	Peak position
Belgian Compilation Albums (Ultratop Flanders)	4
Belgian Compilation Albums (Ultratop Wallonia)	5
Dutch Compilation Albums (Compilation Top 30)	8
German Compilation Albums (Offizielle Top 100)	12
Swedish Physical Albums (Sverigetopplistan)	36

=== Certifications ===
Certifications for Eurovision Song Contest: Malmö 2024
Region	Certification	Certified units/sales
United Kingdom (BPI)	Silver	60,000^{‡}
^{‡} Sales+streaming figures based on certification alone.

== See also ==
- Junior Eurovision Song Contest 2024
- Eurovision Young Musicians 2024
