= Zapping (internet cable operator) =

Chilean IPTV television provider

- Type: Joint-stock company
- Industry: Telecommunications
- Founded: December 11, 2017; 8 years ago in Santiago, Chile
- Headquarters: Santiago, Chile
- Area served: Chile; Brazil; Ecuador
- Products: Pay television (IPTV)
- Website: zapping.com

Zapping (until 2020 Zapping TV), is a Chilean IPTV television provider with over 150 channels, as well as in-house channels such as Zapping Music (music videos), Zapping Sports (sporting events) and Zapping Channel (live cameras of several points of Chile).

== History ==
The company was created on December 11, 2017, replacing the El Telón online radio and TV app, which closed due to legal issues.

In October 2022, Zapping acquired Brazilian Guigo TV.

On March 23, 2023, the brand was registered under Peru's Instituto Nacional de Defensa de la Competencia y de la Protección de la Propiedad Intelectual (Indecopi), and announced its launch in Peru on August 28, 2023.

In November 2023, it added the Latin American version of Playboy TV. Seven channels from Disney, including NatGeo and Fox Sports, were removed on December 28, 2023, in a dispute. Eleven channels, including MTV were then added.

On May 11, 2024, it exclusively broadcast the final of the 2024 Eurovision Song Contest to Chile, Peru and Brazil. The company repeated the endeavor in 2025 for Chile.

On July 24, 2024, Zapping made its official launch in Ecuador to cover LigaPro (both Serie A and Serie B) within Ecuador under the Zapping Sports brand, after a commercial agreement with the official rights holder, Xtrim. It also offered IPTV packages offered by Xtrim.

Zapping added the Latin American feed of Las Estrellas as well as tlnovelas to Brazil in October, but soon removed them over rights issues.

By April 2025, some regional Brazilian ISPs were carrying the service.

On June 30, 2026, Zapping was shut down its service in Peru; in the meantime, they are looking to bring it back with the help of an external partner.
