= Vasyl Baidak =

Ukrainian comedian

- Василь Байдак
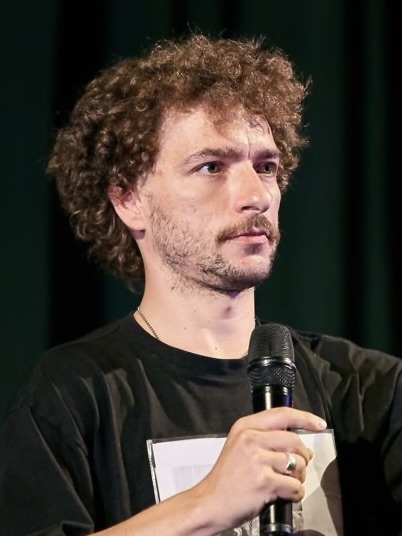
- Born: 14 January 1991 (age 35); Vinnytsia, Ukrainian SSR, Soviet Union
- Education: Yaroslav Mudryi National Law University
- Occupation: Stand-up comedian
- Years active: 2012–present
- Spouse: Yelyzaveta Sazonova ()

Vasyl Baidak (Ukrainian: Василь Васильович Байдак; born 14 January 1991 in Vinnytsia, Ukraine) is a Ukrainian stand-up comedian with absurdist comedy being his primary genre. He is also known as a fundraiser for Ukrainian defence forces, film and advertisements actor and director, commentator of Ukrainian broadcasts of the Eurovision Song Contest and host of Vidbir, the annual musical competition to determine the Ukrainian representative for Eurovision.

In November 2023 he was included into the rating of the "Top 100 Ukrainian leaders" compiled by the news outlet "Ukrainska Pravda", in the category of "culture".

== Biography ==
He was born in Vinnytsia, Ukraine, and since childhood exhibited his talent to entertain people.

After finishing his school, he entered the Yaroslav Mudryi National Law University, and there he started doing humor as a part of the university stand-up group. In 2012, Baidak together with Oleksandr Serdiuk, Oleh Svyshch and Vadym Kozedub created a stand-up group of their own, titled "Vorobushek" ("little sparrow"), and they started doing stand-ups in the Kharkiv league of the KVN. In April, during one of the KVN games, their team was disqualified due to mismatch of what they presented during rehearsal and what they presented live. After that, they founded Vorobushek absurdist theater.

He took part in several comedian shows on the Ukrainian television.

In 2013 he had his very first solo concert, which he presented under the scene name of Uncle Vasia. He still performs solo concerts from time to time.

He often takes part in different projects of the stand-up club "Pidpilnyi stendap" ("Underground stand-up").

Starting from March 2022 he actively fundraises for the Ukrainian military, often makes charity stand-up in the warfare zone. Became a member of a parody group "BADstreet Boys".

== Personal life ==
He is married to Yelyzaveta Sazonova. Their relationship started when they were university students. She actively helps Baidak in organizing his stand-ups, filming and activism.

== Awards ==
- In February 2024 received a "Varti" award from the Nova Poshta company in "Creative communications" nomination.
- On 4 December 2025 received a "Golden heart" award from the President of Ukraine for his efforts in fundraising for the Ukrainian defence forces.
