= Jennifer Bosshard =

Swiss television presenter

- Bosshard in 2024
- Born: 7 May 1993 (age 33); Switzerland
- Employer: SRF

Jennifer Bosshard (born 7 May 1993) is a Swiss television presenter at Schweizer Radio und Fernsehen (SRF).

== Biography ==
Bosshard studied history and German at the University of Basel and graduated with a Bachelor of Arts. In addition to her studies, she worked as a freelancer for the culture department of the Basler Zeitung. This was followed by a six-month internship at the women's magazine Annabelle.

Bosshard worked as an intern for several months and on 1 March 2018, she became a permanent editor in the editorial department of the tabloid magazine G&G - Faces and Stories (then G&G - Glanz und Gloria). At the beginning of May 2018, she succeeded Annina Frey as presenter of the show. She had her first moderation on 7 May 2018.
