= Norway in the Eurovision Song Contest 2024 =

- Eurovision Song Contest 2024
- Participating broadcaster: Norsk rikskringkasting (NRK)
- Country: Norway
- Selection process: Melodi Grand Prix 2024
- Selection date: 3 February 2024

Competing entry
- Song: "Ulveham"
- Artist: Gåte
- Songwriters: Gunnhild Sundli; Magnus Børmark; Jon Even Schärer; Marit Jensen Lillebuen; Ronny Graff Janssen; Sveinung Ekloo Sundli

Placement
- Semi-final result: Qualified (10th, 43 points)
- Final result: 25th, 16 points

Participation chronology

Norway was represented at the Eurovision Song Contest 2024 with the song "Ulveham" performed by Gåte. The Norwegian participating broadcaster, Norsk rikskringkasting (NRK), organised the national final Melodi Grand Prix 2024 between January and February 2024 in order to select its entry for the contest.

== Background ==
Prior to the 2024 contest, Norsk rikskringkasting (NRK) had participated in the Eurovision Song Contest representing Norway sixty-two times since its first entry in 1960. It had won the contest on three occasions: in 1985 with the song "La det swinge" performed by Bobbysocks!, in 1995 with the song "Nocturne" performed by Secret Garden and in 2009 with the song "Fairytale" performed by Alexander Rybak. Norway also had the two dubious distinctions of having finished last in the Eurovision final eleven times, more than any other country, and for having received nul points (zero points) four times, the latter being a record shared with Austria. Following the introduction of semi-finals for 2004, it had finished in the top ten ten times. In 2023, "Queen of Kings" performed by Alessandra qualified to the final and placed fifth, their best result in ten years.

As part of its duties as participating broadcaster, NRK organises the selection of its entry in the Eurovision Song Contest and broadcasts the event in the country. NRK confirmed its intention to participate at the 2024 contest in April 2023, as it opened a songwriting camp for the national final Melodi Grand Prix, which had selected its entry for the Eurovision Song Contest in all but one of its participations.

== Before Eurovision ==
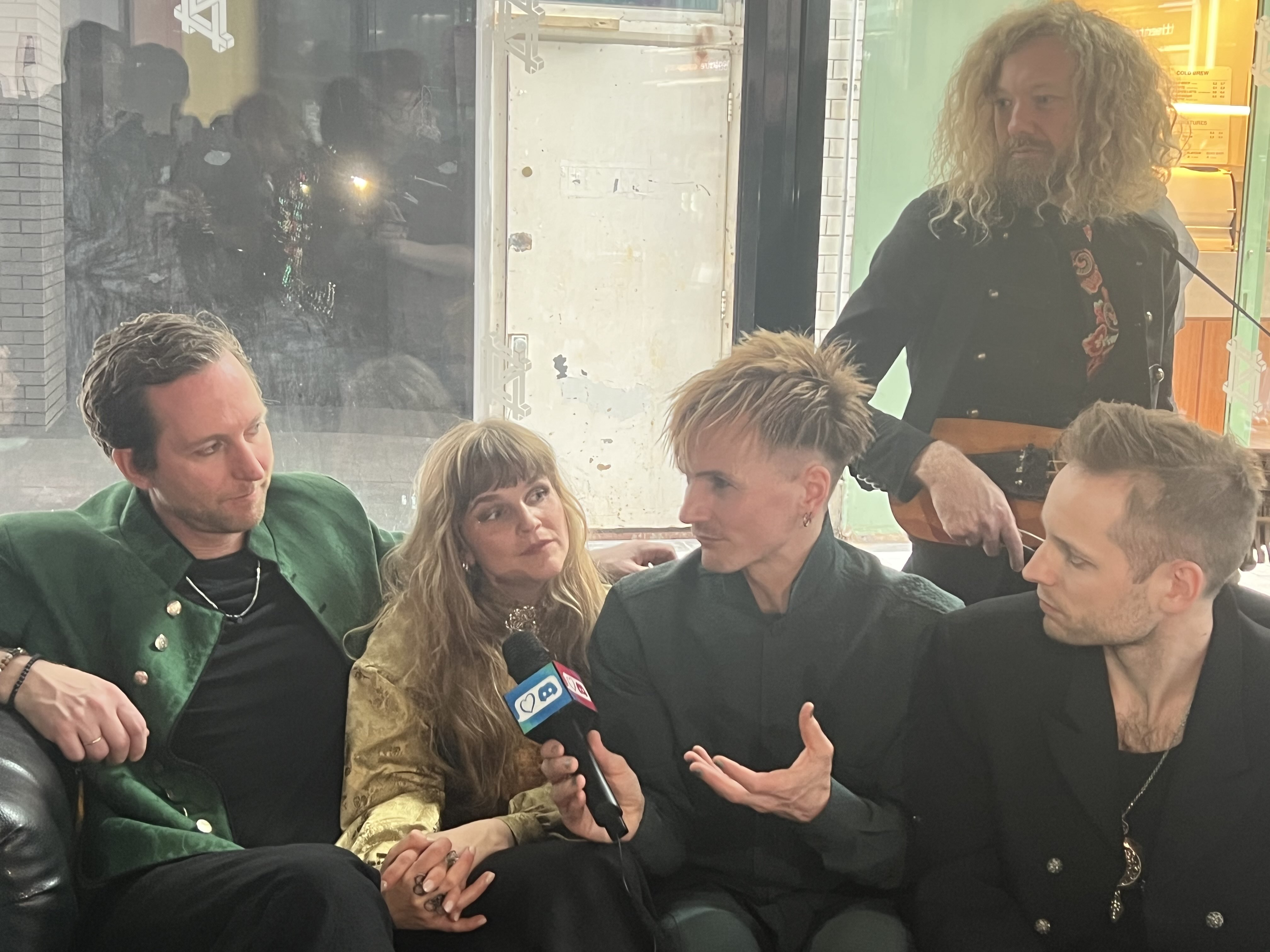
Gåte, winners of Melodi Grand Prix 2024

=== Melodi Grand Prix 2024 ===
Melodi Grand Prix 2024 was the 62nd edition of the Norwegian national final Melodi Grand Prix (MGP) which selected the Norwegian entry for the 2024 contest. The competition consisted of three semi-finals on 13, 20 and 27 January 2024 at the NRK studios in Marienlyst, and a final on 3 February 2024 at Trondheim Spektrum. In each semi-final, six songs competed and the top three entries were selected to proceed to the final.

Submissions were open between 9 June and 31 August 2023, with the list of 18 selected entries announced on 5 January 2024. These included four past Norwegian Eurovision representatives: Benedicte Adrian as part of Mistra (1984, then part of Dollie de Luxe); Margaret Berger (2013); Keiino (2019); and Gaute Ormåsen as Super Rob (2022 as part of Subwoolfer).

==== Semi-finals ====
- The first semi-final took place on 13 January 2024. "We Come Alive" performed by Gothminister, "Eya" performed by Ingrid Jasmin and "Oblivion" performed by Margaret Berger advanced to the final, while "Woman Show" performed by Mathilde SPZ feat. Chris Archer and Slam Dunk, "Stranded" performed by Fredrik Halland and "Heart on Fire" performed by Myra were eliminated.
- The second semi-final took place on 20 January 2024. "My AI" performed by Super Rob and Erika Norwich, "Judge Tenderly of Me" performed by Dag Erik Oksvold and Anne Fagermo and "Ulveham" performed by Gåte advanced to the final, while "Heartache" performed by Farida, "You're Mine" performed by Mileo and "Touch of Venus" performed by Eli Kristin were eliminated.
- The third semi-final took place on 27 January 2024. "Save Me" performed by Annprincess, "Green Lights" performed by Miia and "Damdiggida" performed by Keiino advanced to the final, while "Mer" performed by Vidar Villa, "Waltz of Death" performed by Mistra and "Take Me to Heaven" performed by Thomas Jenssen were eliminated.

==== Final ====
The final took place on 3 February 2024.

Final – 3 February 2024
R/O	Artist	Song	Jury	Televote	Total	Place
1	Keiino	"Damdiggida"	98	146	244	2
2	Annprincess	"Save Me"	16	17	33	9
3	Gothminister	"We Come Alive"	35	80	115	4
4	Ingrid Jasmin	"Eya"	22	20	42	8
5	Miia	"Green Lights"	54	22	76	6
6	Margaret Berger	"Oblivion"	26	19	45	7
7	Dag Erik Oksvold and Anne Fagermo	"Judge Tenderly of Me"	58	47	105	5
8	Gåte	"Ulveham"	76	174	250	1
9	Super Rob and Erika Norwich	"My AI"	45	120	165	3

=== Promotion ===
As part of the promotion of their participation in the contest, Gåte attended the Melfest WKND event in Stockholm on 8 March 2024, the PrePartyES in Madrid on 30 March 2024 (though not in person), the Barcelona Eurovision Party on 6 April 2024, the London Eurovision Party on 7 April 2024, the Eurovision in Concert event in Amsterdam on 13 April 2024, and the Nordic Music Celebration's Eurovision Night in Oslo on 20 April 2024. In addition, they performed at the Eurovision Village in Malmö on 4 May 2024.

=== Calls for boycott ===
The inclusion of Israel in the list of participants of the 2024 contest, despite the humanitarian crisis resulting from Israeli military operations in the Gaza Strip during the Gaza war, sparked controversy in Norway as well as several other participating countries, with calls and petitions for broadcasters to boycott the event. Charlo Halvorsen, head of entertainment at NRK, initially stated that the broadcaster was following the decisions of the European Broadcasting Union (EBU), ultimately commenting that it would not seek a "cultural boycott" of Israel in order not to "compromise [its] integrity" in response to demonstrations outside of NRK's headquarters on 5 January 2024, during the presentation of the MGP contestants. Further demonstrations took place before the first and second semi-final of the event on 13 and 20 January, reiterating the calls for the exclusion of Israel in light of the number of casualties among journalists since the outbreak of the war and denouncing the targeting of Palestinian children; one of the protesters of 13 January, identified as Oslo city council member Jorunn Folkvord, broke in during the live broadcast saying that "Norway can do more". In addition, a petition asking NRK for a boycott was launched by singers Marthe Valle and Marte Wulff, which was to be handed to the broadcaster after the third semi-final of MGP on 27 January; 530 artists were among the signatories by 12 March, including several past MGP entrants. The winners of MGP, Gåte, also expressed initial uncertainty about taking part in the competition due to the participation of Israel, but ultimately confirmed their presence at the contest.

While not mentioning Israel's participation in the contest, on 29 March 2024, Gåte released a joint statement with other Eurovision 2024 entrants – namely Bambie Thug (Ireland), Iolanda (Portugal), Megara (San Marino), Mustii (Belgium), Nemo (Switzerland), Olly Alexander (United Kingdom), Saba (Denmark), Silvester Belt (Lithuania) and Windows95man (Finland) – calling for "an immediate and lasting ceasefire" in Gaza as well as the return of the Israeli hostages held by Hamas.

In early April 2024, three NRK authors announced their refusal to write the broadcaster's annual Eurovision review due to Israel's participation in the contest, demanding that NRK pressure the EBU to exclude the country.

== At Eurovision ==
The Eurovision Song Contest 2024 took place at the Malmö Arena in Malmö, Sweden, and consists of two semi-finals held on the respective dates of 7 and 9 May and the final on 11 May 2024. All nations with the exceptions of the host country and the "Big Five" (France, Germany, Italy, Spain and the United Kingdom) are required to qualify from one of two semi-finals in order to compete in the final; the top ten countries from each semi-final progress to the final. On 30 January 2024, an allocation draw was held to determine which of the two semi-finals, as well as which half of the show, each country would perform in; the EBU split up the competing countries into different pots based on voting patterns from previous contests, with countries with favourable voting histories put into the same pot. Norway was scheduled for the second half of the second semi-final. The shows' producers then decided the running order for the semi-finals; Norway was set to perform in position 15.

In Norway, all three shows are being broadcast on NRK1, as well as on the broadcaster's streaming platform NRK TV, with commentary by Marte Stokstad; the final will be aired on radio via NRK P1, with commentary by Jon Marius Hyttebakk. Ahead of the contest, NRK organised and broadcast the traditional Eurovision preview show Adresse, under the title Adresse Malmø; hosted by Stokstad, it consisted of five shows between 13 April and 4 May 2024, each featuring a panel composed of television personalities and members from the public who discussed and evaluated the competing entries, ultimately decreeing a favourite – namely Italy's Angelina Mango with "La noia". As part of the Eurovision programming, NRK also cooperated with DR and SVT alongside other EBU member broadcasters – namely ARD/WDR, the BBC, ČT, ERR, France Télévisions, NTR, RÚV, VRT and Yle – to produce and air a documentary titled ABBA – Against the Odds, on the occasion of the 50th anniversary of Sweden's first victory at the contest with "Waterloo" by ABBA.

=== Performance ===
Gåte took part in technical rehearsals on 30 April and 3 May, followed by dress rehearsals on 8 and 9 May. The staging of their performance of "Ulveham" at the contest features smoke, lasers, and a spinning platform for the lead singer; the colour green is predominant.

=== Semi-final ===
Norway performed in position 15, following the entry from Israel and before the entry from the Netherlands. At the end of the show, the country was announced as a qualifier for the final.

=== Final ===
Following the semi-final, Norway was drawn to perform in the second half of the final. Norway performed in position 14, following the entry from the United Kingdom and before the entry from Italy.

=== Voting ===
Below is a breakdown of points awarded to and by Norway in the second semi-final and in the final. Voting during the three shows involved each country awarding sets of points from 1-8, 10 and 12: one from their professional jury and the other from televoting in the final vote, while the semi-final vote was based entirely on the vote of the public. The Norwegian jury consisted of Daniel Owen, Lars Horn Lavik, Annprincess Johnson Koffa, Lisa Stokke, and Gunilla Süssmann. In the second semi-final, Norway placed 10th with 43 points, marking the country's seventh consecutive grand final qualification. In the final, Norway placed 25th and last with 16 points, resulting in the country's record-extending twelfth last place finish in the final, and first since 2012. Over the course of the contest, Norway awarded its 12 points to Israel in the second semi-final, and to Switzerland (jury) and Croatia (televote) in the final.

NRK initially appointed Alessandra Mele, who represented Norway in the 2023 contest, as its spokesperson to announce the Norwegian jury's votes in the final. Mele later withdrew from her role, with Ingvild Helljesen replacing her as spokesperson. Mele cited Israel's participation in the contest despite the Gaza war as the reason for her withdrawal.

==== Points awarded to Norway ====
Points awarded to Norway (Semi-final 2)
Score	Televote
12 points	
10 points	
8 points	Denmark
7 points	
6 points	Estonia; Latvia
5 points	San Marino (Note: San Marino uses a jury in the semi-finals.)
4 points	Netherlands
3 points	Belgium; Czechia; France; Rest of the World
2 points	
1 point	Albania; Switzerland

Points awarded to Norway (Final)
Score	Televote	Jury
12 points		
10 points		
8 points		
7 points		
6 points		Albania
5 points		
4 points		
3 points	Ukraine	
2 points		Finland; Lithuania
1 point	Finland	Austria; Czechia

==== Points awarded by Norway ====
Points awarded by Norway (Semi-final 2)
Score	Televote
12 points	Israel
10 points	Denmark
8 points	Netherlands
7 points	Switzerland
6 points	Latvia
5 points	Armenia
4 points	Estonia
3 points	Czechia
2 points	Austria
1 point	Greece

Points awarded by Norway (Final)
Score	Televote	Jury
12 points	Croatia	Switzerland
10 points	Sweden	France
8 points	Ukraine	Israel
7 points	France	Armenia
6 points	Switzerland	Germany
5 points	Israel	Italy
4 points	Ireland	Ukraine
3 points	Lithuania	Sweden
2 points	Latvia	Greece
1 point	Finland	Georgia

==== Detailed voting results ====
Each participating broadcaster assembles a five-member jury panel consisting of music industry professionals who are citizens of the country they represent. Each jury, and individual jury member, is required to meet a strict set of criteria regarding professional background, as well as diversity in gender and age. No member of a national jury was permitted to be related in any way to any of the competing acts in such a way that they cannot vote impartially and independently. The individual rankings of each jury member as well as the nation's televoting results were released shortly after the grand final.

The following members comprised the Norwegian jury:

- Lars Horn Lavik
- Daniel Johansen Elmrhari (Daniel Owen)
- Annprincess Johnson Koffa
- Lisa Stokke
- Gunilla Süssmann

Detailed voting results from Norway (Semi-final 2)
R/O	Country	Televote	
R/O	Country	Rank	Points
01	Malta	14	
02	Albania	13	
03	Greece	10	1
04	Switzerland	4	7
05	Czechia	8	3
06	Austria	9	2
07	Denmark	2	10
08	Armenia	6	5
09	Latvia	5	6
10	San Marino	15	
11	Georgia	12	
12	Belgium	11	
13	Estonia	7	4
14	Israel	1	12
15	Norway		
16	Netherlands	3	8

Detailed voting results from Norway (Final)
R/O	Country	Jury							Televote	
R/O	Country	Juror A	Juror B	Juror C	Juror D	Juror E	Rank	Points	Rank	Points
01	Sweden	13	8	12	5	5	8	3	2	10
02	Ukraine	6	9	6	14	3	7	4	3	8
03	Germany	8	3	4	12	6	5	6	15	
04	Luxembourg	11	12	11	19	14	16		20	
~~05~~	~~Netherlands~~ ‡ (Note: The Netherlands was disqualified prior to the final.)	~~25~~	~~5~~	~~21~~	~~11~~	~~10~~	~~14~~		N/A	
06	Israel	2	6	3	23	2	3	8	6	5
07	Lithuania	20	25	18	13	17	21		8	3
08	Spain	21	13	23	9	12	17		13	
09	Estonia	24	10	14	22	13	18		14	
10	Ireland	16	11	25	24	25	20		7	4
11	Latvia	5	20	9	18	7	11		9	2
12	Greece	4	14	10	6	18	9	2	18	
13	United Kingdom	17	16	24	17	19	24		21	
14	Norway									
15	Italy	3	17	7	2	15	6	5	11	
16	Serbia	18	21	13	20	20	22		19	
17	Finland	23	24	22	25	22	25		10	1
18	Portugal	7	15	16	4	21	12		23	
19	Armenia	9	2	2	8	11	4	7	12	
20	Cyprus	14	18	17	21	23	23		17	
21	Switzerland	1	4	1	7	1	1	12	5	6
22	Slovenia	15	19	20	16	16	19		24	
23	Croatia	22	22	5	15	8	13		1	12
24	Georgia	12	23	15	3	9	10	1	22	
25	France	10	1	8	1	4	2	10	4	7
26	Austria	19	7	19	10	24	15		16	
