= Ole A. Sørli =

Norwegian musician

Ole A. Sørli (12 September 1946 – 4 August 2009) was a Norwegian musician and writer as well as a music industry manager and record producer.

== Career ==
He first gained fame as a musician and leader of the band The Cool Cats (1961 to 1967) and worked throughout the rest of his life producing and managing western music.

In 1967 he was employed by Arne Bendiksen to launch the music cassette in Norway. From 1971 to 1977, he was general manager of the record label Polydor. In 1978 he started Sørli DB Records along with the brothers Paul and Helge Karlsen and produced records by Erik Bye, Cornelis Vreeswijk, and the record featuring The Smurfs in Norwegian. Two years later Sørli founded Notabene Records and produced, among other projects acts such as Knutsen & Ludvigsen, Linda Martin and Ole I'Dole.

In December 1980 he helped put together the "Norwegian Uff – Independent Producer Association of Phonograph Records", which later changed its name to "Fono". He became the association's first chairman, and in addition to running their companies, he assumed several other offices in the industry, including one as a board member of Fono and the chairman of the Norwegian Grammy Committee.

Sørli influenced record industry development through the 1980s and 1990s. His opinions and views on American music were highly regarded amongst his peers.

One of his greatest achievements was as the managing director of the musical Which Witch, for which he also co-wrote the book with Piers Haggard. The music was written by Benedicte Adrian and Ingrid Bjørnov. The team behind the musical managed to get the show staged in London's West End in 1992, where it run for 76 performances, for a total audience of 37,000, before the show had to close in December). Sørli also wrote essays on the history of witchcraft.

== Which Witch ==
Which Witch is a free adaptation opera/musical of an incident from the witch-hunter's handbook, the 15th century Malleus Maleficarum. Producer Sørli wrote the original manuscript, and was executive director of the project.

=== Synopsis ===
- Maria Vittoria, foster-daughter of an influential Roman family, has fallen in love with her German tutor, Daniel, recently made a bishop of the Catholic Church. After causing a scandal at the Vatican the lovers are obliged to leave Rome and Daniel takes Maria back to his family home in Heidelberg where Daniel mysteriously falls ill on the following day and remains in a deep sleep. Anna Regina, Daniel's older sister, then accuses Maria of having cast a spell on Daniel and the townspeople turn on Maria and she is imprisoned for witchcraft. A few weeks later, Cardinal Gonzaga, the Inquisitor, arrives from Rome to cure the Bishop and prosecute his mistress. Maria manages to escape from jail, but instead of fleeing Heidelberg to save her life, she seeks out Daniel. Reunited in the church they have a brief moment of happiness together. Further conflict ensues.

=== Criticism ===
- Which Witch was originally commissioned for the Bergen International Arts Festival in 1987.
- "a brilliant new pop opera; the arrival of a new and vital voice from the frozen north; the most impressive new piece to come out of Scandinavia" (Time Magazine, May 1989)
- "Before this all-consuming project, Adrian and Bjørnov were performing and recording as a pop/rock/opera duo, Dollie de Luxe. Their records and performances up until 1996 were produced by Sørli, and it is this trio's combination of rock music and classical elements that has created "great melodic beauty and taut rhythmic drive" (Time Magazine).

=== Legacy ===
The London success led to a 1993 summer concert tour that was the biggest ever music event in Norway, setting box office records everywhere. Following summer concerts in 1994 of a Norwegian version, Which Witch has only been performed in semi-professional theatre and concert productions. In addition to this, a TV production of the West End final performance has been shown on Danish, Norwegian and Czech television (2002).

== Death ==
After half a year of illness Sørli died in 2009.

== Production credits ==
- I Smurfeland (LP) DB Records (3) 1978
- Smurfe-Sangen / Skal Vi Smurfe Gåter? (7") DB Records (3) 1978
- Fiskepudding! Lakrisbåter! (Album) ◄ (2 versions) Notabene Records 1980
- Fiskepudding! Lakrisbåter! (LP) Notabene Records 1980
- Fiskepudding! Lakrisbåter! (Cass, Album) Notabene Records 1980
- Første Akt (LP) DB Records (3) 1980
- Gråt Ikke Mer (7") NotaBene Records 1981
- Hard Valuta (Cass, Album) NotaBene Records 1981
- I Want You / Forever (7") NotaBene Records 1982
- På Gang Igjen (7") NotaBene Records 1982
- Juba Juba (Album) ◄ (3 versions) Notabene Records 1983
- Juba Juba (LP, Album) Notabene Records 1983
- Juba Juba (Cass, Album) Notabene Records 1983
- Juba Juba (CD, Album) Universal Music (Norway) 1999
- Queen of the Night / Satisfaction (Maxi) ◄ (3 versions) Queen of the Night / S... Carrere 1984
- Queen of the Night / Satisfaction (7") Queen of the Night Carrere Records 1986
- Queen of the Night / Satisfaction (12", Maxi) Polydor 1984
- Queen of the Night / Satisfaction (12") Queen of the Night Notabene Records 1985
- Wanted (Dead Or Alive) (7", Single) Notabene Records 1984
- Sammen, For Livet (LP, Comp) Oh Boy Forente Artister 1985
- Rock Vs. Opera (CD, Album) Notabene Records 1986
- Eternally (7", Single) Notabene Records 1987
- Ludvigsens Hostesaft (LP, Album) Notabene Records 1987
- Cornelis Bästa (2xCD) Warner Bros. Records Music Sweden 2003
- Maskindans – Norsk Synth 1980–1988 (2xCD, Comp, Dig + Box) Space, Action, Sex Og ... Hommage Records 2009

=== Appears On ===
- Første Akt (LP) Sov Søtt, Lille Mann,... DB Records (3) 1980
- Musikk På Gang 16 (Cass, Comp) Everybody Loves A Winner VG 1984
- Which Witch, The Operamusical – London Cast Album (2xCD, Album) Notabene Records 1993
