= Daniel Owen (disambiguation) =

Daniel Owen (1836–1895) was a Welsh writer.

Daniel Owen may also refer to:

- Danny Owen, fictional character in Peaky Blinders
- Daniel Owen (judge) (1732–1812), lieutenant governor of Rhode Island and Chief Justice of the Rhode Island Supreme Court
- Daniel Owen (singer) (born 1999), Norwegian singer and dancer

== See also ==
- Daniel Owens (born 1967), American football player
