= Israel in the Eurovision Song Contest 2024 =

- Eurovision Song Contest 2024
- Participating broadcaster: Israeli Public Broadcasting Corporation (IPBC/Kan)
- Country: Israel
- Selection process: Artist: HaKokhav HaBa; Song: Internal selection
- Selection date: Artist: 6 February 2024; Song: 10 March 2024

Competing entry
- Song: "Hurricane"
- Artist: Eden Golan
- Songwriters: Avi Ohayon; Keren Peles; Stav Beger

Placement
- Semi-final result: Qualified (1st, 194 points)
- Final result: 5th, 375 points

Participation chronology

Israel was represented at the Eurovision Song Contest 2024 with the song "Hurricane", written by Avi Ohayon, Keren Peles, and Stav Beger, and performed by Eden Golan. The Israeli participating broadcaster, the Israeli Public Broadcasting Corporation (IPBC/Kan), selected Golan as its entrant through the show HaKokhav HaBa (Rising Star), in collaboration with commercial broadcaster Keshet and Tedy Productions, while the song "Hurricane" was chosen internally. The Gaza war impacted the production of HaKokhav HaBa and brought Israel's participation in the contest into controversy.

Israel was drawn to compete in the second semi-final of the Eurovision Song Contest which took place on 9 May 2024. Performing during the show in position 14, "Hurricane" was announced among the top 10 entries of the first semi-final and therefore qualified to compete in the final on 11 May. It was later revealed that Israel placed first out of the 16 participating countries in the semi-final with 194 points. In the final, Israel performed in position 6 and placed fifth out of the 25 participating countries, scoring 375 points.

== Background ==
Prior to the 2024 contest, the Israel Broadcasting Authority (IBA) until 2017, and the Israeli Public Broadcasting Corporation (IPBC/Kan) since 2018, had participated in the Eurovision Song Contest representing Israel forty-five times since the IBA's first entry in 1973. They had won the contest on four occasions: in 1978 with the song "A-Ba-Ni-Bi" by Izhar Cohen and the Alphabeta, in 1979 with the song "Hallelujah" by Milk and Honey, in 1998 with the song "Diva" by Dana International, and in 2018 with the song "Toy" by Netta. Since the introduction of semi-finals in 2004, they had, to this point, managed to qualify to the final 12 times, achieving, besides its 2018 victory, four top ten results: in 2005 with "Hasheket Shenish'ar" by Shiri Maimon placing fourth, in 2008 with "The Fire in Your Eyes" by Boaz placing ninth, in 2015 with "Golden Boy" by Nadav Guedj placing ninth, and in 2023 with "Unicorn" by Noa Kirel placing third.

As part of its duties as participating broadcaster, Kan organises the selection of its entry in the Eurovision Song Contest and broadcasts the event in the country. On 5 June 2023, Kan confirmed its participation in the 2024 contest, announcing that its representative would return to be selected through the reality singing competition HaKokhav HaBa (Rising Star), which had been used between 2015 and 2020.

== Before Eurovision ==
=== HaKokhav HaBa ===
As was the case between 2015 and 2020, the artist who would represent Israel in the Eurovision Song Contest 2024 was selected through the reality singing competition HaKokhav HaBa, produced by Tedy Productions and Keshet Media Group, and broadcast on Keshet 12 as well as online via mako.co.il. The shows took place at the Neve Ilan Communications Center in Neve Ilan, and were hosted by Assi Azar and Rotem Sela. The judging panel for the competition was composed of Assaf Amdursky, Keren Peles, Shiri Maimon (2005 Israeli Eurovision entrant), Ran Danker, Itay Levi and Eden Hason.

Preliminary casting rounds started in late July 2023 and ended on 10 September 2023 at Pavilion 2 of Expo Tel Aviv (Eurovision 2019 venue), where candidates were judged based on an a cappella performance of two songs of their choice.

==== Shows and impact of the Gaza war ====
Qualifiers from the preliminary casting phase proceeded to the auditions proper, held in Neve Ilan and originally set to be filmed in the presence of an audience from late September or early October 2023 and to begin airing in November 2023. However, following the outbreak of the Gaza war on 7 October 2023, filming for the competition was initially postponed in compliance with the Home Front Command's protection guidelines, eventually beginning without an audience in the week between 16 and 22 October, with the broadcasts initially scheduled to start on 31 October. The audience vote, which was set to determine 40% of the result alongside the judges, was replaced by the votes of a focus group.

On 31 October 2023, when it was planned to air, the broadcast of the first episode was postponed in order to commemorate two soldiers who had been killed in combat earlier that day. The decision to air the show in such circumstances was criticised by Israeli audiences and media, and the broadcasts were ultimately rescheduled to start on 20 November; for the initial run of episodes, the competition carried the title HaKokhav HaBa: MaHadura Miyuchedet (transl. The Next Star: Special Edition) before returning to the previous title HaKokhav HaBa L'Eirovizion (transl. The Next Star for Eurovision) for the final episodes. The second show, scheduled for 22 November, was postponed to make room for a governmental press conference regarding a deal negotiated that day for the release of hostages held by Hamas; broadcasting resumed on 2 December. Segments from the opening of the casting round of 10 September were included in the televised shows.

The audition shows also included segments in support of the Israel Defense Forces (IDF), and the very first contestant Shai Tamino, a member of the IDF's Education and Youth Corps band, performed wearing military fatigues; this led several Eurovision fan media outlets to begin limiting their coverage of Israel's participation in the contest, on the grounds that it clashed with the non-political and pacifist values traditionally associated with the event. (Note: Attributed to multiple references:)

===== Auditions =====
Candidates were required to get a score of at least 70% of the votes from the judges and a focus group in order to advance.

Audition 1 – 20 November 2023
R/O	Artist	Song	Jury votes						Score	Result
R/O	Artist	Song	A. A.	E. H.	K. P.	I. L.	R. D.	S. M.	Score	Result
1	Shai Tamino	"Ulay"	Yes	Yes	Yes	Yes	Yes	Yes	85%	Advanced
2	Lian Biran	"Anyone"	Yes	Yes	Yes	Yes	Yes	Yes	97%	Advanced
3	Eliya Sharabi	"LeEhov Otakh Kol Yom"	No	Yes	Yes	Yes	No	Yes	56%	Eliminated
4	Eden Golan	"Rise Up"	Yes	Yes	Yes	Yes	Yes	Yes	100%	Advanced

Audition 2 – 2 December 2023
R/O	Artist	Song	Jury votes						Score	Result
R/O	Artist	Song	A. A.	E. H.	K. P.	I. L.	R. D.	S. M.	Score	Result
1	Moria Angel	"Rise Up"	Yes	Yes	Yes	Yes	Yes	Yes	96%	Advanced
2	Jonathan Bitton	"Kakha Zeh"	Yes	Yes	Yes	Yes	Yes	Yes	86%	Advanced
3	Malka Bernstein	"Lo LeFakhed Klal"	No	No	Yes	Yes	Yes	No	45%	Eliminated
4	Arik Sinai	"Shamayim"	Yes	Yes	Yes	Yes	Yes	Yes	90%	Advanced

Audition 3 – 3 December 2023
R/O	Artist	Song	Jury votes						Score	Result
R/O	Artist	Song	A. A.	E. H.	K. P.	I. L.	R. D.	S. M.	Score	Result
1	Shauli Greenglick†	"Atalef Iver"	No	Yes	Yes	Yes	Yes	Yes	83%	Expected to advance (Note: On 26 December, Greenglick, serving as a captain in the IDF, was confirmed to have been killed in action in the Gaza Strip.)
2	Michelle Shimonov	"When We Were Young"	Yes	Yes	Yes	Yes	Yes	Yes	88%	Advanced
3	Ido Bartal	"Lekh Lishon" / "Eyfoh Hayit"	No	Yes	Yes	Yes	Yes	Yes	80%	Advanced
4	Ofri Maduel	"HaKol Ad LeKhan"	No	Yes	No	Yes	Yes	Did not vote	55%	Eliminated
5	Adele Zeltzer	"Mikhal"	No	Yes	Yes	Yes	Yes	Yes	87%	Advanced

Audition 4 – 6 December 2023
R/O	Artist	Song	Jury votes						Score	Result
R/O	Artist	Song	A. A.	E. H.	K. P.	I. L.	R. D.	S. M.	Score	Result
1	Orel Ravid	"Ab HaRakhman"	No	Yes	Yes	Yes	Yes	Yes	87%	Advanced
2	Liran Ben Moshe	"Shney Yeladim BaOla"	Yes	No	Yes	Yes	Yes	Yes	75%	Advanced
3	Noya Shrem	"We're Good"	Yes	Yes	No	Yes	Yes	Yes	70%	Advanced
4	Shalev Admoni	"Osa Li Tzarot"	No	Yes	No	No	Yes	No	42%	Eliminated
5	Mika Moshe	"Khazaka Yoter"	No	Yes	Yes	Yes	Yes	Yes	79%	Advanced

Audition 5 – 10 December 2023
R/O	Artist	Song	Jury votes						Score	Result
R/O	Artist	Song	A. A.	E. H.	K. P.	I. L.	R. D.	S. M.	Score	Result
1	Malki Lipsker	"Another Love"	Yes	Yes	Yes	Yes	Yes	Yes	95%	Advanced
2	Raz Levi	"Yeled HaSadeh"	No	No	Yes	Yes	No	Yes	53%	Eliminated
3	Dor Shimon	"Akharei HaNetzakh"	Yes	Yes	Yes	Yes	Yes	Yes	94%	Advanced
4	Yehuda Saado	"Angels"	No	Yes	Yes	Yes	Yes	Yes	73%	Advanced

Audition 6 – 17 December 2023
R/O	Artist	Song	Jury votes						Score	Result
R/O	Artist	Song	A. A.	E. H.	K. P.	I. L.	R. D.	S. M.	Score	Result
1	Noa Aharon	"Mangina"	Yes	Yes	Yes	Yes	Yes	Yes	94%	Advanced
2	Zohar Zacharov	"LaTzet MiDikaon"	No	Yes	Yes	Yes	Yes	Yes	81%	Advanced
3	Or Giny	"Hero"	No	No	No	Yes	Yes	Yes	55%	Eliminated
4	Libi Naftali	"Unicorn"	No	Yes	Yes	Yes	Yes	Yes	82%	Advanced

Audition 7 – 18 December 2023
R/O	Artist	Song	Jury votes						Score	Result
R/O	Artist	Song	A. A.	E. H.	K. P.	I. L.	R. D.	S. M.	Score	Result
1	Mika Kertis	"All I Want"	No	Yes	Yes	Yes	Yes	Yes	87%	Advanced
2	Israel Levi	"Yesh Ein Sof"	No	Yes	Yes	Yes	Yes	Yes	78%	Advanced
3	Frida Uziel	"Tzipor Bli Shamayim"	Yes	No	Yes	Yes	Yes	No	57%	Eliminated
4	Eitan Jorno	"Jealous"	Yes	Yes	Yes	Yes	Yes	Yes	90%	Advanced
5	Romi Netz	"My Future"	Yes	No	Yes	Yes	Yes	Yes	78%	Advanced

Audition 8 – 20 December 2023
R/O	Artist	Song	Jury votes						Score	Result
R/O	Artist	Song	A. A.	E. H.	K. P.	I. L.	R. D.	S. M.	Score	Result
1	Or Cohen	"Nakhon LeHaYom"	No	Yes	Yes	Yes	Yes	Yes	83%	Advanced
2	Gal Kafri	"She's Always a Woman"	No	Yes	Yes	Yes	Yes	Yes	86%	Advanced
3	Shoval Mualem	"Akharei HaNetzakh"	No	Yes	No	Yes	Yes	Yes	62%	Eliminated
4	Tahel Perry	"Stone Cold"	Yes	Yes	Yes	Yes	Yes	(Note: Maimon was absent from the audition.)	79%	Advanced
5	Tamar Ben-Zvi	"While My Guitar Gently Weeps"	No	Yes	Yes	Yes	Yes	Yes	77%	Advanced

Audition 9 – 25 December 2023
R/O	Artist	Song	Jury votes						Score	Result
R/O	Artist	Song	A. A.	E. H.	K. P.	I. L.	R. D.	S. M.	Score	Result
1	Mishel Cohen	"Ksheat Atzuva"	Yes	Yes	Yes	Yes	Yes	Yes	88%	Advanced
2	Itay Ben Shalom	"Hay Shketa"	No	Yes	Yes	Yes	No	Yes	70%	Advanced
3	Anael Bender	"How Far I'll Go"	No	Yes	Yes	Yes	No	No	68%	Eliminated
4	Roman Belov	"Believer"	Yes	Yes	No	No	Yes	Yes	72%	Advanced
5	Sharon Kidushin	"HaKol Boer"	Yes	Yes	Yes	Yes	Yes	Yes	79%	Advanced

Audition 10 – 27 December 2023
R/O	Artist	Song	Jury votes						Score	Result
R/O	Artist	Song	A. A.	E. H.	K. P.	I. L.	R. D.	S. M.	Score	Result
1	Tal Sofer	"Dancing with the Devil"	Yes	Yes	Yes	Yes	Yes	Yes	96%	Advanced
2	Yosef Avraham	"Yekhefim"	No	Yes	Yes	Yes	Yes	Yes	71%	Advanced
3	Ofri Atias	"Kol Shana Yesh April"	No	Yes	Yes	Yes	Did not vote	No	49%	Eliminated
4	Gal Juma	"Flowers"	Yes	Yes	No	Yes	Yes	Yes	71%	Advanced
5	May Naftali	"Somewhere Only We Know"	No	Yes	Yes	Yes	Yes	Did not vote	78%	Advanced

===== Shortlisting round =====
The following phase, aired in segments on 31 December 2023, consisted of a shortlisting round, where the artists receiving a "yes" vote from all six judges automatically qualified and the others were chosen among those who had received four or five "yes" votes. 14 artists were shortlisted, namely Lian Biran, Eden Golan, Arik Sinai, Yehuda Saado, Shai Tamino, Ido Bartal, Mika Moshe, Jonathan Bitton, Mika Kertis, Dor Shimon, Or Cohen, Gal Kafri, Moria Angel, and Orel Ravid.

===== Top 14 round =====
In the top 14 round, the votes of the judges and an audience determined one contestant to be eliminated from each show, ultimately coming down to the top five. In each of the first two shows and in the sixth show, the artist to be eliminated was the one getting the lowest overall score. In the third, fourth, seventh and ninth show, the artists were paired in duels, with the winners directly qualifying to the next round; the judges then selected one eliminee per show among the others. In the fifth show, the artists were coupled to perform duets, with the eliminee selected between the lowest scoring duo. In the eighth show, each contestant performed a duet with a surprise guest artist.

Top 14 round – Show 1 – 3 January 2024
R/O	Artist	Song	Jury votes						Score	Result
R/O	Artist	Song	A.A.	E.H.	K.P.	I.L.	R.D.	S.M.	Score	Result
1	Mika Moshe	"LaTet VeLaKakhat"	Yes	Yes	Yes	Yes	Yes	Yes	96%	Advanced
2	Or Cohen	"Creep"	Yes	Yes	Yes	Yes	Yes	Yes	94%	Advanced
3	Jonathan Bitton	"Af Ekhad Lo Ba Li"	No	No	Yes	Yes	Yes	Yes	65%	Advanced
4	Moria Angel	"Listen"	No	No	Yes	No	Yes	No	50%	Advanced
5	Dor Shimon	"Yareakh"	No	Yes	Yes	No	No	Yes	60%	Advanced
6	Gal Kafri	"Shir LaIma"	No	No	No	No	No	Yes	41%	Eliminated
7	Eden Golan	"Ain't No Other Man"	Yes	Yes	Yes	Yes	No	Yes	85%	Advanced

Top 14 round – Show 2 – 7 January 2024
R/O	Artist	Song	Jury votes						Score	Result
R/O	Artist	Song	A.A.	E.H.	K.P.	I.L.	R.D.	S.M.	Score	Result
1	Lian Biran	"Someone You Loved"	Yes	Yes	Yes	Yes	Yes	Yes	93%	Advanced
2	Ido Bartal	"LeEhov Otakh Kol Yom" / "Yasmin"	No	Yes	Yes	No	Yes	Yes	67%	Advanced
3	Shai Tamino	"Paam At Layla"	Yes	Yes	Yes	Yes	Yes	No	84%	Advanced
4	Yehuda Saado	"Merov Ahava Shotek"	No	No	No	Yes	Yes	Yes	50%	Eliminated
5	Orel Ravid	"Kol Kakh Harbeh Shirim"	Yes	Yes	Yes	Yes	Yes	Yes	95%	Advanced
6	Mika Kertis	"Scars to Your Beautiful"	Yes	Yes	Yes	Yes	No	No	72%	Advanced
7	Arik Sinai	"Gara Mul HaMayim"	Yes	Yes	Yes	Yes	Yes	Yes	91%	Advanced

Top 14 round – Show 3 – 10 January 2024
Duel	R/O	Artist	Song	Jury votes						Score	Result
Duel	R/O	Artist	Song	A.A.	E.H.	K.P.	I.L.	R.D.	S.M.	Score	Result
I	1	Or Cohen	"Hopelessly Devoted to You"	Yes	Yes	Yes	Yes	Yes	Yes	93%	Advanced
I	2	Mika Moshe	"Tamid Yekhaku LeKha"	Yes	No	Yes	Yes	Yes	Yes	86%	Saved
II	3	Mika Kertis	"Mad World"	Yes	Yes	Yes	No	No	No	59%	Eliminated
II	4	Orel Ravid	"Yesh Li Sikuy"	Yes	Yes	Yes	Yes	Yes	Yes	96%	Advanced
III	5	Lian Biran	"Can't Help Falling in Love"	Yes	Yes	Yes	Yes	Yes	Yes	95%	Saved
III	6	Eden Golan	"HaLev Sheli"	Yes	Yes	Yes	Yes	Yes	Yes	96%	Advanced

Top 14 round – Show 4 – 14 January 2024
Duel	R/O	Artist	Song	Jury votes						Score	Result
Duel	R/O	Artist	Song	A.A.	E.H.	K.P.	I.L.	R.D.	S.M.	Score	Result
I	1	Jonathan Bitton	"Zan Nadir"	Yes	Yes	Yes	Yes	Yes	Yes	92%	Advanced
I	2	Dor Shimon	"Tipat Mazal"	Yes	Yes	Yes	Yes	No	Yes	80%	Saved
II	3	Shai Tamino	"Fix You"	No	No	Yes	Yes	Yes	No	66%	Saved
II	4	Moria Angel	"(You Make Me Feel Like) A Natural Woman"	No	Yes	Yes	Yes	Yes	Yes	82%	Advanced
III	5	Ido Bartal	"LiFamim"	No	Yes	Yes	Yes	Yes	Yes	75%	Eliminated
III	6	Arik Sinai	"Shir Prida"	Yes	Yes	Yes	Yes	Yes	Yes	87%	Advanced

Top 14 round – Show 5 – 17 January 2024
R/O	Artist	Song	Jury votes						Score	Result
R/O	Artist	Song	A.A.	E.H.	K.P.	I.L.	R.D.	S.M.	Score	Result
1	Mika Moshe	"Yeladim Shel HaKhayim"	No	Yes	Yes	No	Yes	Yes	73.58%	Advanced
1	Orel Ravid	"Yeladim Shel HaKhayim"	No	Yes	Yes	No	Yes	Yes	73.58%	Advanced
2	Dor Shimon	"Skharkhoret" / "Badad"	No	Yes	Yes	Yes	No	Yes	73.71%	Advanced
2	Jonathan Bitton	"Skharkhoret" / "Badad"	No	Yes	Yes	Yes	No	Yes	73.71%	Advanced
3	Eden Golan	"If I Ain't Got You"	Yes	Yes	Yes	Yes	Yes	Yes	93%	Advanced
3	Or Cohen	"If I Ain't Got You"	Yes	Yes	Yes	Yes	Yes	Yes	93%	Advanced
4	Lian Biran	"Imagine"	No	No	No	No	Yes	No	29%	Saved
4	Moria Angel	"Imagine"	No	No	No	No	Yes	No	29%	Eliminated
5	Arik Sinai	"LiFnei SheYigamer"	No	Yes	Yes	Yes	No	Yes	77%	Advanced
5	Shai Tamino	"LiFnei SheYigamer"	No	Yes	Yes	Yes	No	Yes	77%	Advanced

Top 14 round – Show 6 – 21 January 2024
R/O	Artist	Song	Jury votes						Score	Result
R/O	Artist	Song	A.A.	E.H.	K.P.	I.L.	R.D.	S.M.	Score	Result
1	Or Cohen	"Take Me to Church"	No	Yes	Yes	Yes	Yes	Yes	86%	Advanced
2	Shai Tamino	"Ma Ata Rotzeh Mimeni"	No	Yes	Yes	Yes	Yes	Yes	83%	Advanced
3	Dor Shimon	"Am Yisrael Chai"	Yes	Yes	Yes	Yes	Yes	Yes	88%	Advanced
4	Mika Moshe	"...Baby One More Time"	Yes	Yes	Yes	Yes	Yes	Yes	94%	Advanced
5	Orel Ravid	"Absurd"	No	Yes	Yes	Yes	Yes	Yes	81%	Advanced
6	Eden Golan	"The Climb"	Yes	Yes	Yes	Yes	Yes	Yes	90%	Advanced
7	Jonathan Bitton	"Pakhad Elohim"	Yes	No	Yes	Yes	No	Yes	62%	Eliminated
8	Lian Biran	"Af Akhat"	No	Yes	Yes	Yes	Yes	No	68%	Advanced
9	Arik Sinai	"Hallelujah"	No	No	Yes	Yes	Yes	Yes	66%	Advanced

Top 14 round – Show 7 – 22 January 2024
Duel	R/O	Artist	Song	Jury votes						Score	Result
Duel	R/O	Artist	Song	A.A.	E.H.	K.P.	I.L.	R.D.	S.M.	Score	Result
I	1	Mika Moshe	"Hey Tom"	Yes	Yes	Yes	Yes	Yes	Yes	97%	Advanced
I	2	Dor Shimon	"Min nhar li mshiti"	Yes	Yes	Yes	Yes	No	Yes	81%	Saved
II	3	Lian Biran	"Out Here on My Own"	No	Yes	Yes	Yes	Yes	Yes	82%	Advanced
II	4	Orel Ravid	"LeHaamin"	Yes	No	Yes	Yes	No	No	59%	Eliminated
III	5	Eden Golan	"Masterpiece"	Yes	Yes	No	Yes	Yes	Yes	83%	Advanced
III	6	Shai Tamino	"Warrior"	Yes	Yes	Yes	No	Yes	No	73%	Saved
IV	7	Or Cohen	"Lo Yadati SheTelkhi Mimeni"	Yes	Yes	Yes	Yes	Yes	Yes	94%	Advanced
IV	8	Arik Sinai	"Tagidi"	Yes	Yes	Yes	Yes	Yes	Yes	79%	Saved

Top 14 round – Show 8 – 25 January 2024
R/O	Artist	Guest artist	Song	Jury votes						Score	Result
R/O	Artist	Guest artist	Song	A.A.	E.H.	K.P.	I.L.	R.D.	S.M.	Score	Result
1	Or Cohen	Margalit Tzan'ani	"Proud Mary"	Yes	Yes	Yes	Yes	Yes	Yes	94%	Advanced
2	Mika Moshe	Netta Barzilai	"Nigmar"	Yes	Yes	Yes	No	Yes	Yes	86%	Advanced
3	Dor Shimon	Nasrin Kadri	"Ad Matay Elohay"	No	Yes	Yes	Yes	Yes	Yes	79%	Advanced
4	Eden Golan	Valerie Hamaty	"Let It Be"	Yes	Yes	Yes	Yes	Yes	Yes	92%	Advanced
5	Shai Tamino	Roni Dalumi	"Yamim Shel Sheket"	Yes	Yes	Yes	Yes	Yes	No	72%	Advanced
6	Lian Biran	Tamir Grinberg	"All I Ask"	No	Yes	No	No	Yes	No	56%	Advanced
7	Arik Sinai	Gali Atari	"Shuv"	No	No	Yes	No	Yes	Yes	51%	Eliminated

Top 14 round – Show 9 – 28 January 2024
Duel	R/O	Artist	Song	Jury votes						Score	Result
Duel	R/O	Artist	Song	A.A.	E.H.	K.P.	I.L.	R.D.	S.M.	Score	Result
I	1	Mika Moshe	"Yasmin"	No	Yes	Yes	Yes	Yes	Yes	88%	Advanced
I	2	Or Cohen	"Ilu Yakholti"	No	Yes	Yes	Yes	Yes	Yes	75%	Saved
II	3	Dor Shimon	"Amen Al HaYeladim"	Yes	No	No	No	Yes	Yes	63%	Saved
II	4	Shai Tamino	"I'll Stand by You"	No	No	Yes	Yes	Yes	Yes	72%	Advanced
III	5	Lian Biran	"Ima"	No	Yes	Yes	Yes	Yes	Yes	82%	Eliminated
III	6	Eden Golan	"You Raise Me Up"	Yes	Yes	Yes	Yes	Yes	Yes	94%	Advanced

===== Semi-final round =====
In the first show of the semi-final, the votes of the judges and the audience determined one qualifier to the final. In the second show, the remaining four artists performed, and one of them left the competition.

Semi-final – Show 1 – 29 January 2024
R/O	Artist	Song	Jury votes						Score	Result
R/O	Artist	Song	A.A.	E.H.	K.P.	I.L.	R.D.	S.M.	Score	Result
1	Mika Moshe	"Umbrella"	No	Yes	Yes	Yes	Yes	Yes	84%	Advanced
2	Dor Shimon	"Meohav BaGeshem"	Yes	Yes	Yes	Yes	Yes	Yes	80%	Advanced
3	Shai Tamino	"LeOrekh HaYam"	No	No	Yes	Yes	Yes	No	62%	Advanced
4	Or Cohen	"Khomot Khemar"	Yes	Yes	Yes	Yes	Yes	Yes	93%	Finalist
5	Eden Golan	"Roar"	Yes	Yes	Yes	Yes	Yes	Yes	88%	Advanced

Semi-final – Show 2 – 1 February 2024
R/O	Artist	Song	Jury							Audience	Total	Result
R/O	Artist	Song	A.A.	E.H.	K.P.	I.L.	R.D.	S.M.	Total	Audience	Total	Result
1	Mika Moshe	"Yesh Lakh Otakh"	10	10	10	12	10	10	62	Unknown (Note: The total scores for the first two positions were announced as 85 and 89, but it was not disclosed to which artist each referred.)		Advanced
2	Shai Tamino	"What About Us"	8	7	8	7	7	7	44	7	51	Eliminated
3	Dor Shimon	"KsheHalakhta"	7	8	7	8	8	8	46	11	57	Advanced
4	Eden Golan	"Beautiful"	12	12	12	10	12	12	70	Unknown		Advanced

===== Final =====
The final took place on 6 February 2024 and was divided in a duel round, eliminating one finalist, and a superfinal among the remaining three artists, determining the winner. On 5 February, a special broadcast was aired featuring performances by guest artists and the finalists, each of whom announced which song they would perform in the first round of the final; a public vote, held via the Mako app and determining 10% of the results of the first round, was opened on the same day. 2023 Israeli representative Noa Kirel performed as a guest during the show. In the superfinal, a 50/50 combination of jury and public votes selected Eden Golan as the winner.

Final – 6 February 2024
Duel	R/O	Artist	Song	Jury votes						Score	Result
Duel	R/O	Artist	Song	A.A.	E.H.	K.P.	I.L.	R.D.	S.M.	Score	Result
I	1	Mika Moshe	"Naari Shoveh Elay"	No	Yes	Yes	No	Yes	Yes	64%	Saved
I	2	Or Cohen	"Pri Gankha"	Yes	Yes	Yes	Yes	Yes	Yes	83%	Superfinal
II	3	Dor Shimon	"Hayiti BeGan Eden"	Yes	Yes	No	Yes	Yes	Yes	64%	Eliminated
II	4	Eden Golan	"I Have Nothing"	Yes	Yes	Yes	Yes	Yes	Yes	79%	Superfinal

Superfinal – 6 February 2024
R/O	Artist	Song	Jury							Viewers	Total	Place
R/O	Artist	Song	A.A.	E.H.	K.P.	I.L.	R.D.	S.M.	Total	Viewers	Total	Place
1	Mika Moshe	"Bo"	8	8	8	8	8	8	48	24	72	3
2	Or Cohen	"Crazy"	10	10	10	12	12	10	64	71	135	2
3	Eden Golan	"I Don't Want to Miss a Thing"	12	12	12	10	10	12	68	85	153	1

=== Song selection ===
The song that Eden Golan would perform in the contest was internally selected by a professional committee. On 16 January 2024, Kan and Keshet opened a window for specially selected songwriters to submit their entries until 11 February; submissions were required to include lyrics in Hebrew. Golan also had the option to submit her own entry. The selected entry, titled "Hurricane", was revealed on 10 March during a special broadcast on Kan 11, aired from the Yitzhak Rabin Center in Tel Aviv and hosted by Lior Suchard.

==== Controversy ====
On 19 February 2024, a report by Israel Hayom claimed that the proposed entry for the contest was being written by Avi Ohayon, Keren Peles, and Stav Beger, with it most likely being titled "October Rain". On 21 February, Ynet claimed that the EBU had rejected the entry on the grounds of political content in its lyrics, but that Kan was not planning to change the song or its content. Kan and the EBU later addressed this report, stating that the song was being examined, and that if it did not meet the criteria, Kan would be given the opportunity to alter the lyrics or submit a new entry by 11 March. However, Kan added that if it was asked to change the contents of the song, it would not do so, and be forced to withdraw from the contest. Miki Zohar, Culture and Sports Minister of Israel, called the intention of the EBU to reject the song "scandalous", and "called on the European Broadcasting Union to continue to act professionally and neutrally and not to let politics influence art"; he later expressed his support for the song to be altered in order to meet the criteria for the contest.

On 22 February 2024, Kan published the lyrics of "October Rain". Earlier that day, leaks by Israel Hayom and Ynet described the song as a ballad that builds up to a climax, referencing "the condition of Israeli civilians" in the 7 October attacks and also alluding to the Nova music festival massacre. On 28 February, Ynet reported that the song that finished second in the internal selection, "Dance Forever", written by Golan alongside Ron Biton, May Sfadia, and Yinon Yahel, had also been rejected by the EBU, On 3 March, Kan officially confirmed that it had submitted both "October Rain" and "Dance Forever" to the EBU for consideration, and that both had been rejected by the EBU in their current state. Despite previous statements, Kan ultimately asked the writers of both songs to "make the necessary adjustments" in order for them to be eligible, and announced that the final intended entry, "Hurricane" (reported to be a revision of "October Rain" with changed lyrics), had been recorded later that day. However, the song's writers were reportedly asked to rewrite its lyrics again, and the final version was submitted two days later. The EBU gave its approval for the song on 7 March.

=== Calls for exclusion ===
The humanitarian crisis resulting from Israeli military operations in the Gaza Strip during the war led to calls for the European Broadcasting Union (EBU) to exclude Israel from the 2024 contest, with human rights activists urging other countries to boycott the event. Despite this, Israel ultimately appeared on the list of participants released by the EBU on 5 December 2023. On 8 December, the EBU issued a statement maintaining that Kan "complies with all competition rules", allowing it to participate in 2024. The situation sparked controversy in a number of participating countries:

- Norway, Sweden, the Netherlands, Greece, and Denmark – Representatives of Norwegian broadcaster NRK, Swedish broadcaster SVT, Dutch broadcaster AVROTROS and Greek broadcaster ERT stated that they would follow the EBU's decisions, with NRK stating that it would not seek a "cultural boycott" of Israel in order not to "compromise [its] integrity" and Danish broadcaster DR voicing its support for Israel's participation, citing the complexity and longstanding nature of the Israeli–Palestinian conflict. Demonstrations and petitions calling for a boycott occurred in Norway, Sweden, and Denmark. In addition, in April 2024, three authors for NRK's annual Eurovision review refused to write it for 2024, demanding that the broadcaster pressure the EBU to exclude Israel from the contest.
- Iceland – On 9 December 2023, Stefán Eiríksson, the radio director of Icelandic broadcaster RÚV, stated that the country would still participate in the 2024 contest. In response, the Association of Composers and Lyricists of Iceland (FTT) and activists of the Boycott, Divestment and Sanctions (BDS) movement, then joined by the Icelandic branch of OGAE, sent formal requests that RÚV withdraw from the event unless Israel was excluded "on the same grounds as Russia in the last competition", stressing on human rights violations on the Israeli side. RÚV then chose to hold its national competition, Söngvakeppnin 2024, as usual, and then let the winner decide whether to participate in Eurovision. Eventual Söngvakeppnin winner Hera Björk stated that she would participate in Eurovision prior to the final. RÚV confirmed on 11 March that it would participate, with Hera Björk as its representative. RÚV's commentator for the contest, Gísli Marteinn Baldursson, opted not to resume his role for 2024 in response to the EBU's "lack of reaction" to Israel's offensive in Gaza.
- Ireland – By mid-December 2023, Irish broadcaster RTÉ had received over 465 emails similarly urging it to boycott the event if Israel was permitted to compete, citing "the years of occupation and violence against Palestine"; RTÉ responded by stating that it had always approached the event as "a non-political contest designed to unite audiences and bring people together", arguing that no other broadcaster had expressed the intention to boycott it, with Taoiseach Leo Varadkar and Irish head of delegation Michael Kealy opposing the calls.
- Finland – On 19 December 2023, Finnish broadcaster Yle stated that it had discussed the Gaza war situation with other Nordic broadcasters and monitored the EBU's stance, while also commenting that the war was not comparable to the Russian invasion of Ukraine. The broadcaster decided to hold its Eurovision national final Uuden Musiikin Kilpailu (UMK) regardless of Finland's participation in Eurovision. In January 2024, a petition was signed by Finnish music industry professionals demanding the broadcaster to withdraw or pressure for Israel to be excluded, arguing that the contest offered the country a platform to "polish its image", with Yle responding that it would not oppose Israel's participation.
- Spain – Opposing earlier declarations by María Eizaguirre, head of communications of Spanish broadcaster RTVE, that it would follow the EBU's stance, on 1 February 2024, Spanish left-wing party Podemos submitted a proposal to the Congress of Deputies in order for the government and RTVE to lobby against the inclusion of Israel in the contest and urge other countries to do the same, with a contextual petition for withdrawal promoted within RTVE by Roberto Lakidain, representative of Podemos in the broadcaster's board of directors.
- Slovenia – Following public calls in the country for the exclusion of Israel, on 7 February 2024, Slovenian broadcaster RTVSLO asked the EBU to hold extensive discussions with its member broadcasters regarding Israeli participation, ultimately receiving no response.
- Belgium – In early March 2024, Walloon minister of culture and media Bénédicte Linard announced that she would formally request local broadcaster RTBF (responsible for Belgium's participation in 2024) to push for the exclusion of Israel from the contest, citing the humanitarian crisis in Gaza and the exclusion of Russia in 2022; her Flemish counterpart Benjamin Dalle expressed support for the reasoning. In mid-April, a letter was signed by workers of the Belgian cultural sector demanding that the EBU, RTBF and Flemish broadcaster VRT "take the warnings of the International Court of Justice seriously", "make a statement against the genocide" and bar Israel from competing; VRT commented that it followed the EBU's stance, while RTBF did not respond.
- United Kingdom – In protest against the EBU's approval of the Israeli entry, the organisers of the Eurovision Party London screening event at the Rio Cinema in Dalston, East London, decided to cancel its 2024 edition; this drew criticism from the British National Jewish Assembly, with the EBU's response reiterating that Eurovision "is not a contest between governments".

Petitions and letters requesting the EBU to exclude Israel were also signed by several former Eurovision entrants or intended entrants, including Ágústa Eva Erlendsdóttir (Iceland 2006 as Silvía Night), Malena Ernman (Sweden 2009), Eric Saade (Sweden 2011), Hatari (Iceland 2019), Ben Dolic (Germany 2020), Montaigne (Australia 2020 and 2021) and La Zarra (France 2023). (Note: Attributed to multiple references:) A letter advocating for Israel's continued inclusion was proposed by the Creative Community for Peace organisation; among the over 400 signatories to the letter are Scooter Braun, Harvey Mason Jr. and Helen Mirren. While not mentioning Israel's participation in the contest, on 29 March 2024, several entrants – namely Bambie Thug (Ireland), Gåte (Norway), Iolanda (Portugal), Megara (San Marino), Mustii (Belgium), Nemo (Switzerland), Olly Alexander (United Kingdom), Saba (Denmark), Silvester Belt (Lithuania) and Windows95man (Finland) – released a joint statement calling for "an immediate and lasting ceasefire" in Gaza, as well as the return of the Israeli hostages. Saade, who has Palestinian roots, criticised the EBU's handling of the matter as "disgraceful", and referred to the inclusion of Israel as "propaganda". He further defended his presence as the opening act of the first semi-final "crucial" for Palestinian representation, and upheld this by wearing a keffiyeh on his arm for his performance.

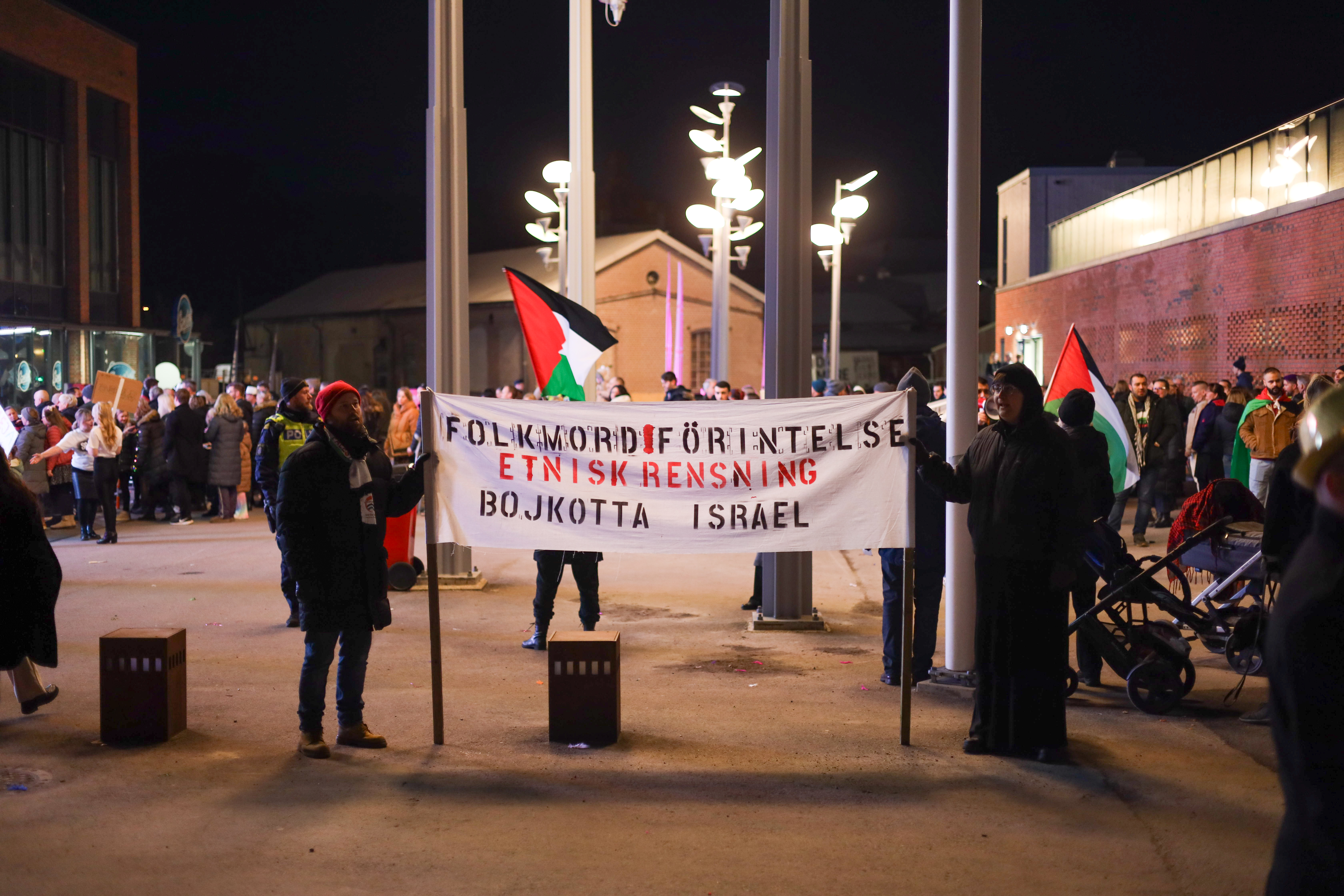
A demonstration against Israel outside the venue of the fourth heat of Melodifestivalen 2024 in Eskilstuna

A number of national selection events were disrupted by activists calling for a boycott in the lead-up to the event, including Norway's Melodi Grand Prix, Spain's Benidorm Fest, Sweden's Melodifestivalen, Denmark's Dansk Melodi Grand Prix, and Finland's Uuden Musiikin Kilpailu; in addition, Dargen D'Amico and Ghali's statements calling for a ceasefire and an end to the "genocide" during their performances at Italy's Sanremo Music Festival caused public reactions by Italian broadcaster RAI and the Israeli ambassador to the country. Demonstrations against Israeli participation also took place in the host city of Malmö, with Israeli prime minister Benjamin Netanyahu commenting that Golan had "already won" against what he referred to as a "horrible wave of antisemitism" in Sweden.

Boycott campaigns, such as the BDS movement's Palestinian Campaign for the Academic and Cultural Boycott of Israel (PACBI), as well as by LGBT organisations Queers in Palestine, Queers for Palestine and Queer Coalition for Palestine, argued that Israel's participation in the contest – widely regarded as an LGBT-inclusive event – was an attempt to "pinkwash", "whitewash" and "artwash" its apartheid policies and the "ongoing genocide" against Palestinians. (Note: Attributed to multiple references:) The refusal of the EBU to discuss Israel's participation was also attributed by some to Moroccanoil, the main sponsor of the event since 2020, (Note: Moroccanoil ended the sponsorship in August 2026.) being an Israeli company, though no definitive link between the two was proven. (Note: Attributed to multiple references:)

On 9 April 2024, the EBU released a statement by deputy director-general Jean Philip De Tender addressing "targeted social media campaigns" against participating artists, reportedly over the insufficient pressure put on the union to exclude Israel. De Tender stated that the inclusion of a country in the contest "is the sole responsibility of the EBU's governing bodies and not that of the individual artists", condemning abuse or harassment directed at the performers while also defending the rationale whereby Kan had been allowed to take part; this was reiterated by the contest's executive supervisor Martin Österdahl in an interview with Dagens industri on 27 April. A FAQ page on Israel's participation was additionally created on the official website of the contest.

==== Historical precedence ====
- The EBU's decision to maintain Israel as a participant was compared to its decision to exclude Russia in 2022 following protests by several participating broadcasters – including the aforementioned NRK, SVT, AVROTROS, DR, RÚV and Yle – over the country's invasion of Ukraine, with some accusing the EBU of "hypocrisy" and exhibiting "double standards". (Note: Attributed to multiple references:)
- In 2019, when it was held in Tel Aviv, the contest faced calls for boycott over allegations of pinkwashing and artwashing; RÚV was fined for political content after its entrant Hatari displayed banners featuring the Palestinian flag during the final. (Note: Attributed to multiple references:)

== At Eurovision ==
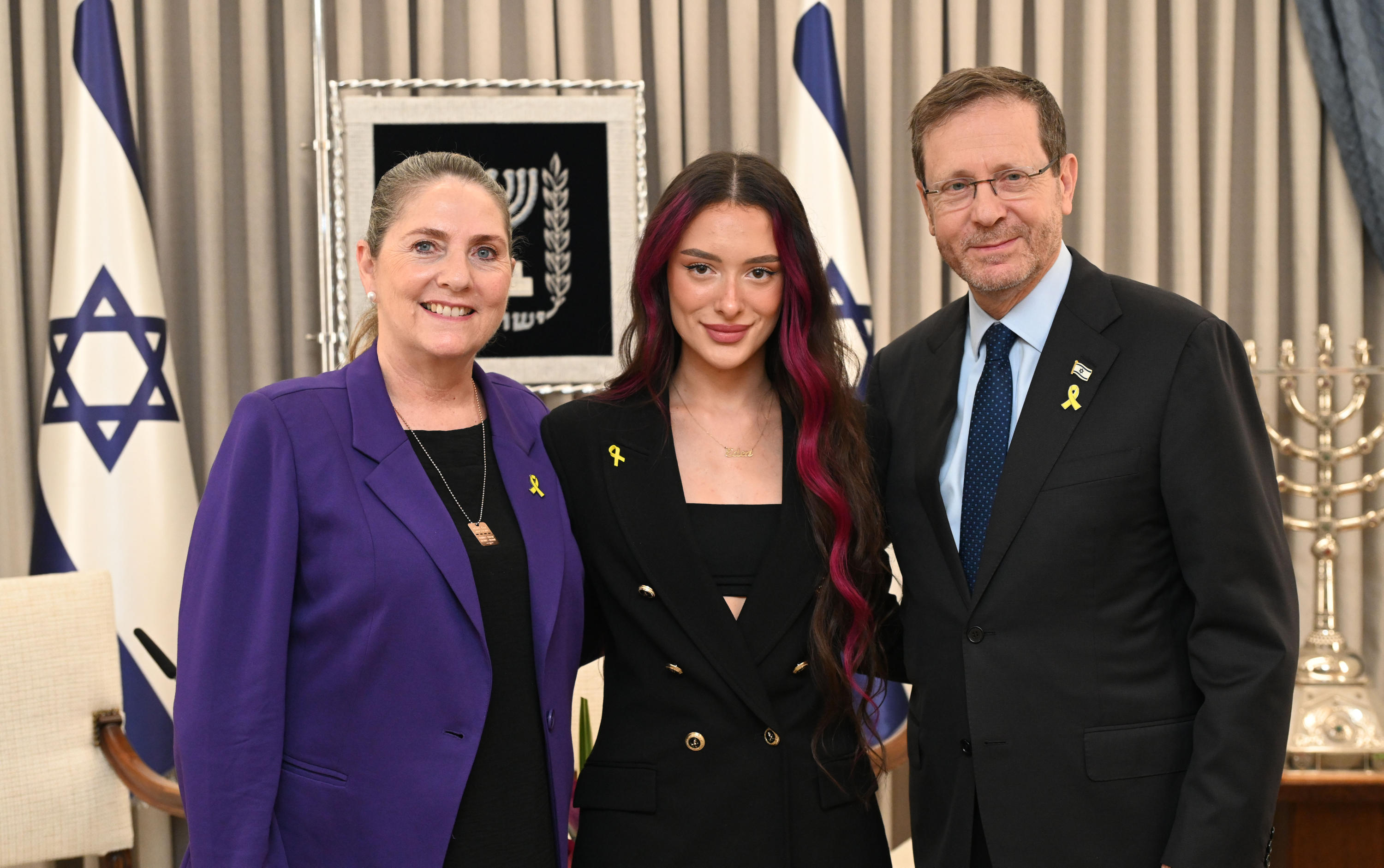
Eden Golan visiting Israeli president Isaac Herzog and first lady Michal Herzog before leaving for Malmö

The Eurovision Song Contest 2024 took place at the Malmö Arena in Malmö, Sweden, and consisted of two semi-finals held on the respective dates of 7 and 9 May and the final on 11 May 2024. All nations with the exceptions of the host country and the "Big Five" (France, Germany, Italy, Spain and the United Kingdom) were required to qualify from one of two semi-finals in order to compete in the final; the top ten countries from each semi-final progressed to the final. On 30 January 2024, an allocation draw was held to determine which of the two semi-finals, as well as which half of the show, each country would perform in; the EBU split up the competing countries into different pots based on voting patterns from previous contests, with countries with favourable voting histories put into the same pot. At the request of Kan, Israel was allocated to the second semi-final as the rehearsal date for the first one coincides with Yom HaShoah; the country was drawn to perform in the second half of the show. The shows' producers then decided the running order for the semi-finals; Israel was set to perform in position 14.

In Israel, all three shows of the contest were broadcast on Kan 11, with commentary provided by Asaf Liberman and Akiva Novick; Yoav Tzafir joined them for the final. The final was also aired on radio via Kan 88, Kan Tarbut and Kan Bet.

=== Security ===
Due to the controversy surrounding Israel's participation, Shin Bet sent "a much higher caliber of security team" which worked with Swedish security officials to protect the Israeli delegation; Shin Bet's head Ronen Bar traveled to Malmö the week prior to the contest to help coordinate the security arrangements. As part of the procedures, Golan wore a disguise whenever she was outdoors. The National Security Council of Israel issued a Level 3 threat advisory for Israelis traveling to Malmö, stating that there was "a well-founded fear" of a terror attack against Israelis attending the contest.

=== Performance ===
Eden Golan took part in technical rehearsals on 30 April and 3 May, followed by dress rehearsals on 8 and 9 May. The staging of her performance of "Hurricane" at the contest is directed by Tzafir and Avichai Hacham, with five dancers accompanying the artist on stage and costumes designed by Alon Livne, as well as the usage of a ring-shaped prop. Livne claimed that the organisers explicitly instructed him against using any symbolism that might have political references to "the situation in Israel", rejecting a number of costume proposals. However, the chosen costumes have been said to resemble bandages, evoking thoughts of a hurt, wounded, and healing nation.

==== Protest actions ====
Golan's performances throughout the contest were met with booing, prompting Kan to file complaints to the EBU.

The EBU strove to keep any potentially politically coded messages out of the contest, but numerous other participants engaged in actions that were perceived as such, without directly criticising Israel's participation. ACOD-VRT, the internal socialist trade union of Flemish broadcaster VRT, aired a statement before and after the broadcast of the second semi-final and the final, denouncing Israel's human rights violations and accusing the country of "destroying freedom of the press".

=== Semi-final ===
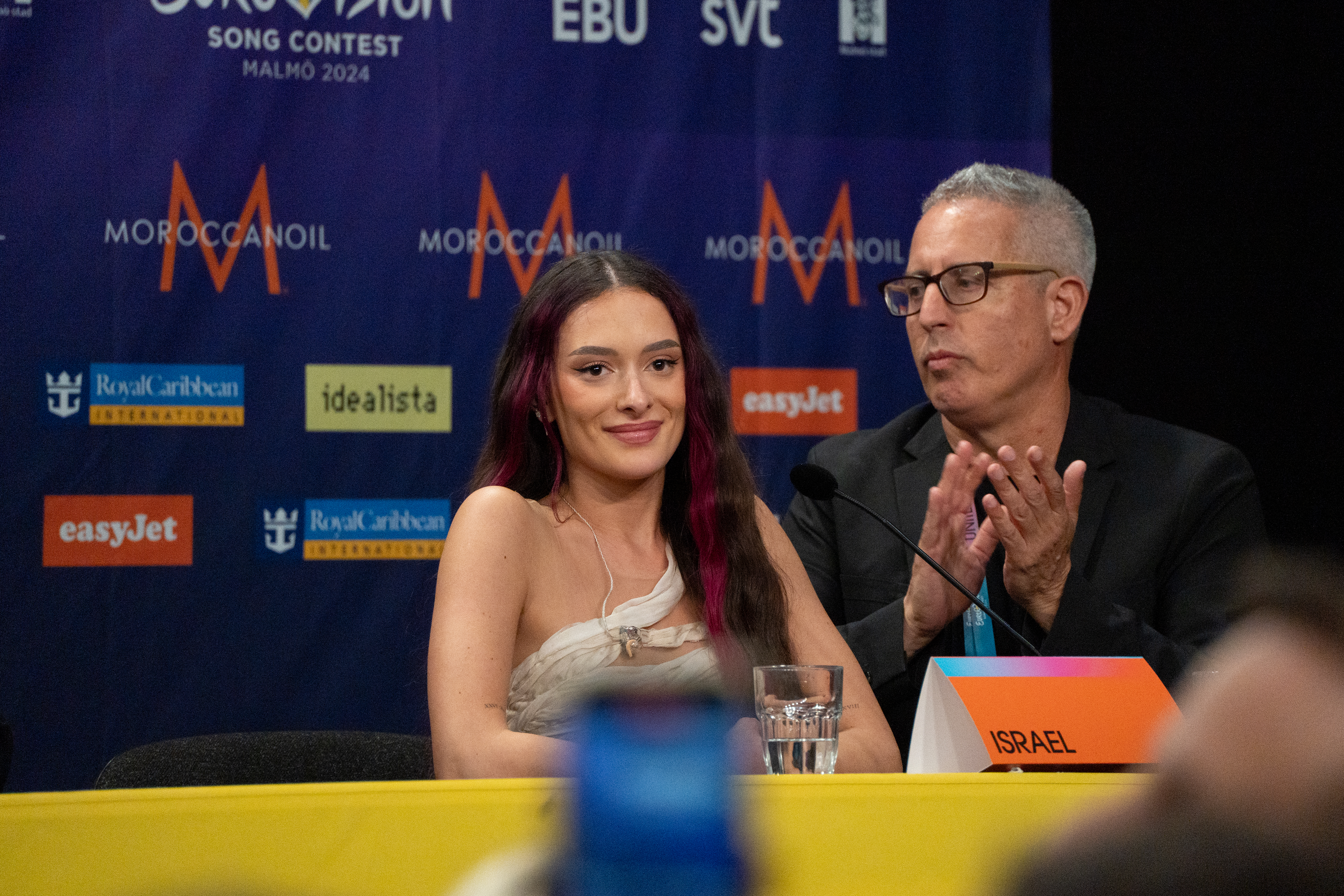
Golan at the qualifiers press conference following the second semi-final.

Israel performed in position 14, following the entry from Estonia and before the entry from Norway. At the end of the show, the country was announced as a qualifier for the final.

=== Final ===
Following the semi-final, Israel drew "producer's choice" for the final, meaning that the country would perform in the half decided by the contest's producers. Israel was set to perform in position 6, following the entry from the Netherlands and before the entry from Lithuania; the Netherlands was later disqualified from the final, resulting in the entry from Luxembourg, which was set to perform in position 4, preceding Israel in the actual show. Golan once again took part in dress rehearsals on 10 and 11 May before the final, including the jury final where the professional juries cast their final votes before the live show on 11 May. She performed a repeat of their semi-final performance during the final on 11 May. Israel placed fifth in the final, scoring 375 points; 323 points from the public televoting and 52 points from the juries.

=== Voting ===
Below is a breakdown of points awarded to and by Israel in the second semi-final and in the final. Voting during the three shows involved each country awarding sets of points from 1–8, 10 and 12: one from their professional jury and the other from televoting in the final vote, while the semi-final vote was based entirely on the vote of the public. The Israeli jury consisted of Yaron Ashbel, Shlomit Dersso, Maya Opal Drukman, Kobi Marimi (who represented Israel in 2019), and May Sfadia. In the second semi-final, Israel placed first with 194 points, receiving the maximum twelve points from Albania, Czech Republic, Denmark, France, Italy, the Netherlands, Norway, Spain, Switzerland and the Rest of the World vote. In the final, Israel placed fifth with 375 points, receiving twelve points from Australia, Belgium, Finland, France, Germany, Italy, Luxembourg, the Netherlands, Portugal, San Marino, Spain, Sweden, Switzerland, the United Kingdom and the Rest of the World in the televote.

Public votes for Israel were boosted by a campaign by Israel's Ministry of Foreign Affairs and Advertising Office, which featured Golan asking for support in French, Italian, Spanish, German, Czech, Latvian, Estonian, Albanian, Georgian and English. The campaign stated, "In light of the wave of hatred and Muslim demonstrations in Malmö, a counter-reaction by the silent majority is taking place. Europeans don't like what their eyes see."

Over the course of the contest, Israel awarded its 12 points to Armenia in the second semi-final, and to Luxembourg in both the jury and televote in the final.

Kan appointed Maya Alkulumbre as its spokesperson to announce the Israeli jury's votes in the final.

==== Points awarded to Israel ====
Points awarded to Israel (Semi-final 2)
Score	Televote
12 points	Albania; Czechia; Denmark; France; Italy; Netherlands; Norway; Rest of the World; Spain; Switzerland
10 points	Austria; Belgium; Georgia; Greece; Latvia; Malta
8 points	Estonia
7 points	
6 points	Armenia
5 points	
4 points	
3 points	
2 points	
1 point	

Points awarded to Israel (Final)
Score	Televote	Jury
12 points	Australia; Belgium; Finland; France; Germany; Italy; Luxembourg; Netherlands; Portugal; Rest of the World; San Marino; Spain; Sweden; Switzerland; United Kingdom	
10 points	Albania; Austria; Cyprus; Czechia; Ireland; Moldova; Slovenia	
8 points	Denmark; Georgia; Iceland	Cyprus; Germany; Norway
7 points	Azerbaijan; Greece; Latvia	
6 points	Estonia	
5 points	Malta; Norway; Poland	Belgium; Estonia
4 points		Lithuania
3 points	Lithuania; Serbia	France; Georgia; Malta; Moldova
2 points		Latvia
1 point	Armenia	

==== Points awarded by Israel ====
Points awarded by Israel (Semi-final 2)
Score	Televote
12 points	Armenia
10 points	Estonia
8 points	Austria
7 points	Netherlands
6 points	Georgia
5 points	Czechia
4 points	Switzerland
3 points	Greece
2 points	Belgium
1 point	Denmark

Points awarded by Israel (Final)
Score	Televote	Jury
12 points	Luxembourg	Luxembourg
10 points	Ukraine	Germany
8 points	Germany	Ukraine
7 points	Italy	Austria
6 points	Armenia	Italy
5 points	Croatia	Switzerland
4 points	Georgia	Croatia
3 points	Austria	Portugal
2 points	France	Georgia
1 point	Cyprus	France

==== Detailed voting results ====
Each participating broadcaster assembles a five-member jury panel consisting of music industry professionals who are citizens of the country they represent. Each jury, and individual jury member, is required to meet a strict set of criteria regarding professional background, as well as diversity in gender and age. No member of a national jury was permitted to be related in any way to any of the competing acts in such a way that they cannot vote impartially and independently. The individual rankings of each jury member as well as the nation's televoting results were released shortly after the grand final.

The following members comprised the Israeli jury:

- Yaron Ashbel
- Eden Dersso
- Maya Opal Drukman
- Kobi Marimi
- May Sfadia

Detailed voting results from Israel (Semi-final 2)
R/O	Country	Televote	
R/O	Country	Rank	Points
01	Malta	12	
02	Albania	15	
03	Greece	8	3
04	Switzerland	7	4
05	Czechia	6	5
06	Austria	3	8
07	Denmark	10	1
08	Armenia	1	12
09	Latvia	11	
10	San Marino	13	
11	Georgia	5	6
12	Belgium	9	2
13	Estonia	2	10
14	Israel		
15	Norway	14	
16	Netherlands	4	7

Detailed voting results from Israel (Final)
R/O	Country	Jury							Televote	
R/O	Country	Juror A	Juror B	Juror C	Juror D	Juror E	Rank	Points	Rank	Points
01	Sweden	9	10	17	17	11	12		16	
02	Ukraine	2	7	4	1	3	3	8	2	10
03	Germany	3	2	2	3	5	2	10	3	8
04	Luxembourg	5	1	1	2	1	1	12	1	12
~~05~~	~~Netherlands~~ ‡ (Note: The Netherlands was disqualified prior to the final.)	~~14~~	~~16~~	~~19~~	~~18~~	~~9~~	~~16~~		N/A	
06	Israel									
07	Lithuania	11	15	15	22	20	18		17	
08	Spain	13	25	6	15	15	13		15	
09	Estonia	20	24	8	23	24	19		12	
10	Ireland	21	14	24	12	13	17		19	
11	Latvia	10	11	13	21	17	15		13	
12	Greece	24	17	21	13	12	22		21	
13	United Kingdom	19	21	11	16	8	14		24	
14	Norway	25	20	20	25	25	25		18	
15	Italy	6	6	7	10	2	5	6	4	7
16	Serbia	16	13	16	20	22	23		20	
17	Finland	22	23	22	14	10	21		14	
18	Portugal	15	4	14	4	19	8	3	23	
19	Armenia	23	19	18	11	14	20		5	6
20	Cyprus	8	12	10	9	18	11		10	1
21	Switzerland	7	3	12	6	7	6	5	11	
22	Slovenia	17	22	25	24	21	24		22	
23	Croatia	1	18	23	7	6	7	4	6	5
24	Georgia	18	8	3	8	16	9	2	7	4
25	France	12	5	9	19	23	10	1	9	2
26	Austria	4	9	5	5	4	4	7	8	3
