= Melodi Grand Prix 2024 =

62nd edition of Melodi Grand Prix

Dates and venues
- Semi-final 1: 13 January 2024
- Semi-final 2: 20 January 2024
- Semi-final 3: 27 January 2024; NRK studios, Marienlyst
- Final: 3 February 2024; Trondheim Spektrum, Trondheim

Organisation
- Broadcaster: Norsk rikskringkasting (NRK)
- Artistic director: Stig Karlsen
- Presenters: Fredrik Solvang; Marion Raven

Participants
- Number of entries: 18
- Number of finalists: 9

Vote
- Voting system: Semi-finals: televote; Final: 60/40 combination of televote and jury votes
- Winning song: "Ulveham" by Gåte

Melodi Grand Prix 2024 was the 62nd edition of Melodi Grand Prix (MGP), the annual Norwegian music competition that serves as the country's preselection for the Eurovision Song Contest. It was organised by Norway's public broadcaster NRK, and consisted of three semi-finals and a final, held between 13 January and 3 February 2024. The winner of the competition, Gåte with "Ulveham", represented Norway in the Eurovision Song Contest 2024 in Malmö, Sweden.

== Format ==
The competition, consisting of three semi-finals at the studios 1 and 2 in Marienlyst and a grand final at Trondheim Spektrum, was organised by NRK between January and February 2024 and is presented by Fredrik Solvang and Marion Ravn. Six entries competed in each semi-final, with a televote decreeing three qualifiers to the final. The result of the final were determined by a 60/40 combination of the votes from the public and an international expert jury, giving more weight to the televote. The competition was broadcast on NRK1 and NRK TV.

The option for artists to make use of autotune, introduced in the previous edition, has been retained, despite not being permitted at the Eurovision Song Contest. The European Broadcasting Union clarified that this rule should be limited to sound effects and must in no circumstance allow the "manipulation" of the artists' vocal performance.

== Competing entries ==
On 9 June 2023, four weeks after the Eurovision Song Contest 2023, NRK officially opened for songwriters to submit entries for Melodi Grand Prix 2024 until 31 August 2023. The competition was open to all songwriters, and each songwriter could submit up to three songs. Each song was required to have at least one Norwegian contributor, in order to "prioritise and promote the Norwegian music scene". In addition to the open submission, NRK also looked for possible entries through targeted search and direct dialogue with the Norwegian music industry, and through songwriting camps (the earliest of which was held in April 2023 at the Røverstaden in Oslo).

For the first time, the songs were allowed to be published as early as 1 September 2023, in line with the EBU's existing rules for the Eurovision Song Contest. Previously, all submitted entries had to be held secret until NRK decided to release them. According to the broadcaster, the aim of the rule change was to create a better "opportunity for more good songs and artists for MGP".

The submissions were first assessed through a number of listening sessions, followed by a live audition phase in the presence of a jury on 25 September 2023. The final list of selected entries, defined by early November 2023, was announced on 5 January 2024. Four former Melodi Grand Prix winners were among the participants: Benedicte Adrian as part of Mistra (1984, then part of Dollie de Luxe); Margaret Berger (2013); Keiino (2019); and Gaute Ormåsen (2022 as part of Subwoolfer) behind the avatar of "Super Rob", who revealed his real identity only after the final.

Artist	Song	Songwriter(s)
Annprincess	"Save Me"	Annprincess Johnson
Dag Erik Oksvold and Anne Fagermo	"Judge Tenderly of Me"	Alexander Pettersen; Anne Fagermo; Dag Erik Oksvold
Eli Kristin	"Touch of Venus"	Eli Kristin Hanssveen; Ronny Graff Janssen
Farida	"Heartache"	Farida Louise Bolseth Benounis; Ilja Eriksson; Kristian Wiik; Olav Tokerud
Fredrik Halland	"Stranded"	Fredrik Halland; Jenson Vaughan; Ruthy Raba
Gåte	"Ulveham"	Ronny Graff Janssen; Sveinung Ekloo Sundli
Gothminister	"We Come Alive"	Bjørn Alexander Brem
Ingrid Jasmin	"Eya"	Ingrid Jasmin Vogt; Jonas Kroon
Keiino	"Damdiggida"	Alexander Nyborg Olsson; Alexandra Rotan; Fred Buljo; Jakob Redtzer; Tom Hugo Hermansen
Margaret Berger	"Oblivion"	Anders Kjær; Margaret Berger; Monika Engeseth; Sivert Hjeltnes Hagtvet
Mathilde SPZ feat. Chris Archer and Slam Dunk	"Woman Show"	Audun Agnar Guldbrandsen; Christopher Colin Archer; Emmy Kristine Guttulsrud Kristiansen; Linda Dale; Mathilde Espeseth; Silje Montsko Blandkjenn
Miia	"Green Lights"	Benjamin Dan Ravn Fahre; Emelie Hollow; Ida Botten; Mia Virik Kristensen; Mugoshi David Nhonzi
Mileo	"You're Mine"	Miles Curtis Sesselmann
Mistra	"Waltz of Death"	Anders Odden; Benedicte Adrian
Myra	"Heart on Fire"	David Atarodiyan; Regina Tucker; Svein Hermansen
Super Rob and Erika Norwich	"My AI"	Erika Norwich; Kristian Liljan; Lars Horn Lavik; Gaute Ormåsen
Thomas Jenssen	"Take Me to Heaven"	David Fremberg; Jonas Holteberg Jensen; Ricky Hanley; Thomas Jenssen
Vidar Villa	"Mer"	Jonas Thomassen; Martin Thomassen; Mathias Nilsen; Vidar Mohaugen

== Contest overview ==
=== Semi-final 1 ===
The first semi-final took place on 13 January 2024.

Semi-final 1 – 13 January 2024
R/O	Artist	Song	Result
1	Mathilde SPZ feat. Chris Archer and Slam Dunk	"Woman Show"	—N/a
2	Fredrik Halland	"Stranded"	—N/a
3	Myra	"Heart on Fire"	—N/a
4	Gothminister	"We Come Alive"	Qualified
5	Ingrid Jasmin	"Eya"	Qualified
6	Margaret Berger	"Oblivion"	Qualified

=== Semi-final 2 ===
The second semi-final took place on 20 January 2024.

Semi-final 2 – 20 January 2024
R/O	Artist	Song	Result
1	Farida	"Heartache"	—N/a
2	Mileo	"You're Mine"	—N/a
3	Eli Kristin	"Touch of Venus"	—N/a
4	Super Rob and Erika Norwich	"My AI"	Qualified
5	Dag Erik Oksvold and Anne Fagermo	"Judge Tenderly of Me"	Qualified
6	Gåte	"Ulveham"	Qualified

=== Semi-final 3 ===
The third semi-final took place on 27 January 2024.

Semi-final 3 – 27 January 2024
R/O	Artist	Song	Result
1	Vidar Villa	"Mer"	—N/a
2	Mistra	"Waltz of Death"	—N/a
3	Thomas Jenssen	"Take Me to Heaven"	—N/a
4	Annprincess	"Save Me"	Qualified
5	Miia	"Green Lights"	Qualified
6	Keiino	"Damdiggida"	Qualified

=== Final ===
The final took place on 3 February 2024 and featured guest performances by Carola (1983, 1991 and 2006 Swedish Eurovision representative), Bobbysocks (1985 MGP winners), Alexander Rybak (2009 and 2018 MGP winner) and Tix (2021 MGP winner). The winner was selected by a 60/40 combination of public televoting and an international jury.

Following the song's qualification, NRK found that the lyrics of "Ulveham" by Gåte had been taken from an existing Norwegian medieval ballad and requested them to be changed, in order to avoid potential infringement of Eurovision regulations mandating all songs be entirely original. The band went on to win the final.

Final – 3 February 2024
R/O	Artist	Song	Jury	Televote		Total	Place
R/O	Artist	Song	Jury	Votes	Points	Total	Place
1	Keiino	"Damdiggida"	98	64,257	146	244	2
2	Annprincess	"Save Me"	16	7,665	17	33	9
3	Gothminister	"We Come Alive"	35	35,219	80	115	4
4	Ingrid Jasmin	"Eya"	22	8,860	20	42	8
5	Miia	"Green Lights"	54	9,858	22	76	6
6	Margaret Berger	"Oblivion"	26	8,366	19	45	7
7	Dag Erik Oksvold and Anne Fagermo	"Judge Tenderly of Me"	58	20,902	47	105	5
8	Gåte	"Ulveham"	76	76,672	174	250	1
9	Super Rob and Erika Norwich	"My AI"	45	53,048	120	165	3

Detailed international jury votes
R/O	Song	United Kingdom	Finland	Switzerland	Estonia	Azerbaijan	Denmark	Netherlands	Iceland	Czech Republic	Sweden
R/O	Song	United Kingdom	Finland	Switzerland	Estonia	Azerbaijan	Denmark	Netherlands	Iceland	Czech Republic	Sweden
1	"Damdiggida"	6	8	12	12	12	10	12	12	6	8
2	"Save Me"	2	2		1	2	2	6		1	
3	"We Come Alive"		6	6	6		1			4	12
4	"Eya"					6	6	2	6		2
5	"Green Lights"	8	12	4			4	10	4	8	4
6	"Oblivion"	1	1	1	2	1	8	8	2	2	
7	"Judge Tenderly of Me"	12		2	8	4	12	1	8	10	1
8	"Ulveham"	4	10	10	10	10			10	12	10
9	"My AI"	10	4	8	4	8		4	1		6

International jury members
Country	Jury members
Azerbaijan	Aysel Teymurzadeh; Nadir Rustamli; Leyla Guliyeva; Isa Melikov (spokesperson); Eldar Rasulov
Czech Republic	Martina Lesner; Eliška Svejkovská; Kryštof Kodl; Kryštof Dobrovský; Karolina Lukaskova
Denmark	Tilde Vinther; Molly Plank (spokesperson); Anders Ugilt Andersen; Bryan Rice; Christian Ellegaard
Estonia	Alika Milova; Karl-Ander Reismann; Vallo Kikas; Riin Vann (spokesperson); Ott Lepland
Finland	Petri Alanko; Minette Ristikari; Neea River; Iiro Myllymäki; Alina Rautava (spokesperson)
Iceland	Diljá Pétursdóttir; Júlí Heiðar Halldórsson; Þórunn Lárusdóttir; Felix Bergsson (spokesperson); Sigríður Eyrún Friðriksdóttir
Netherlands	Maxime Klein Nagelvoort (spokesperson); Koen van Herp; Chris Hartgers; Frank van 't Hof; Suzanne Straatsburg
Sweden	Natalie Carrion (spokesperson); Robert Sehlberg; Helene Wigren; Natasha Azarmi; Mathias Bridfelt
Switzerland	Pelé Loriano; Remo Forrer (spokesperson); Dominique Magnusson; Zoë Anina Kressler; Yves Schifferle
United Kingdom	Andrew Cartmell (spokesperson); Mark Angels; Kevin Hughes; Leila Al-Mitwally; Rosie Smedley

== Ratings ==
Viewing figures by show
Show	Air date	Viewers (millions)	Share (%)	Refs.
Semi-final 1	13 January 2024	0.532	45.4%	
Semi-final 2	20 January 2024	0.550	55.5%	
Semi-final 3	27 January 2024	0.497	49.9%	
Final	3 February 2024	0.843	—N/a	
