= Arik Sinai =

Israeli musician

Arik Sinai אריק סיני
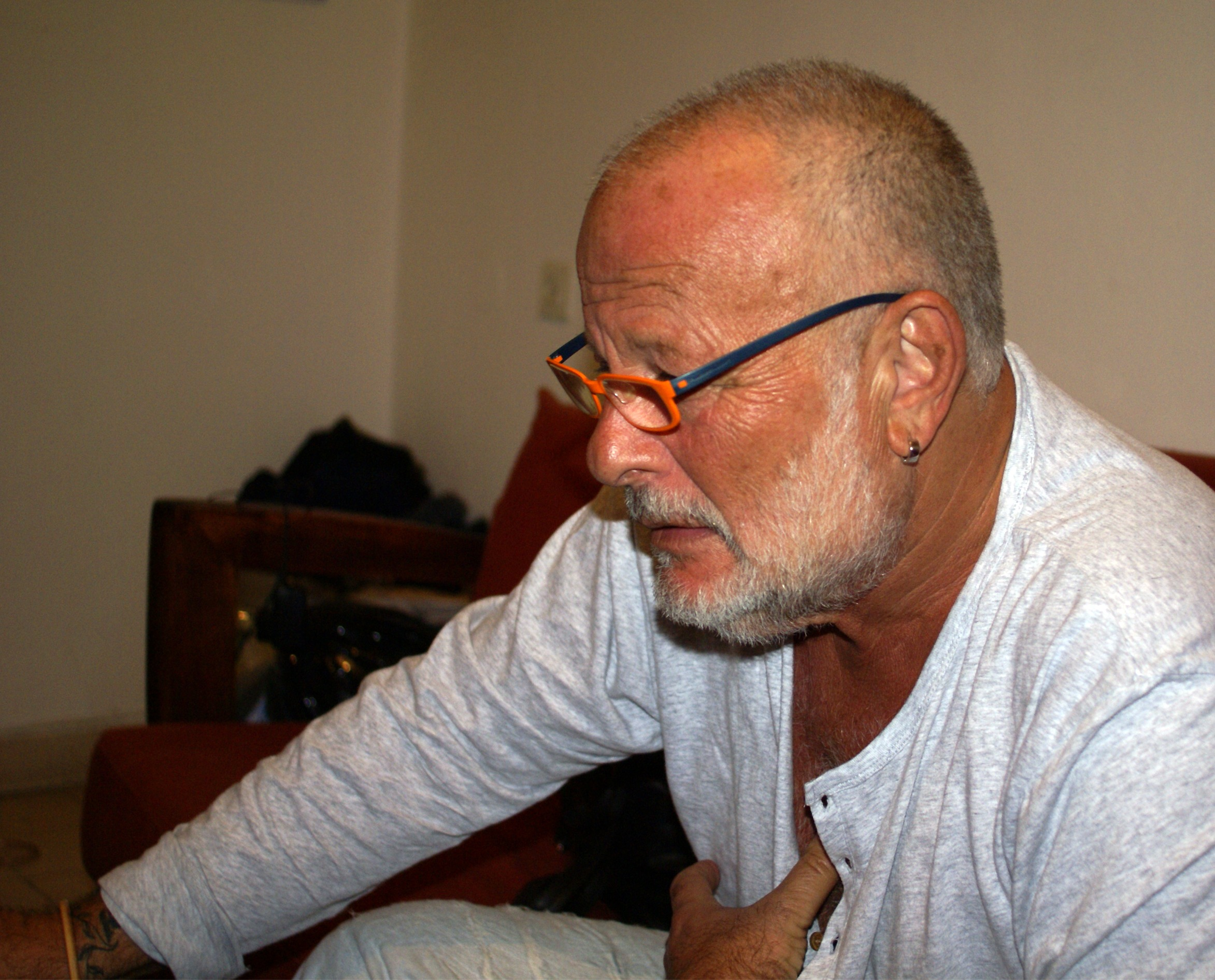
- Sinai in 2008

Background information
- Also known as: Aric Sinai
- Born: June 29, 1949 (age 77); Kiryat Bialik, Israel
- Genres: Country pop; folk music; folk rock; soft rock; Israeli rock
- Instruments: Vocals; guitar
- Years active: 1977–present
- Label: NMC

Arik Sinai (Hebrew: אָרִיק סִינַי [ˈaʁik siˈnai]; born June 29, 1949), also romanized as Aric Sinai, is an Israeli folk and rock singer. His career spans five decades.

== Biography ==
Sinai was born in Kiryat Bialik to Holocaust survivors. In the IDF, he has served in two military ensembles and later as an EMT during the Yom Kippur War.

His career began in 1977 with his breakthrough hit, "Shir Prida" ("Farewell Song"), written by Shlomo Artzi, and has produced multiple hit songs across several decades, which also include "Im Ata Basviva" ("If You Happen to Be Around"), "Derekh HaKurkar" ("The Eolianite Road"), and "Makhur" ("Addicted"). Sinai is known for being the first musician to combine American folk music with traditional Israeli folk music, and for his deep, bass-baritone voice, and his romanticist approach to music.

Sinai has gained significant success in Israel during the 1980s, and has subsequently released three additional studio albums in 1992, 2003, and 2011. During most of the 1990s, he resided in the United States, feeling offended by the low sales of his eighth album in 1992. In 2011 Sinai announced via Facebook that he was effectively retiring from making new music for what he perceived as a lack of respect for the older generation of musicians, but has released multiple singles of new material since then.

=== Eurovision selections ===
Sinai competed in HaKokhav HaBa for the right to represent Israel in the Eurovision Song Contest 2024, which gained much attention in Israel since most of the show's contestants are usually at the beginning of their careers; he made it to the top 14 round of the competition, being eliminated on 25 January 2024. Sinai also participated in the previous Israeli selection Kdam Eurovision in 1985 and 1987, and finished 4th and 8th, respectively.

== Musical style and influences ==
Arik Sinai's music has been described as country pop and "soft country". He had a "cowboy image" at the beginning of his career, which he claims was due to a cigarettes commercial in which he took part. One of his greatest influences is Leonard Cohen, whose "Suzanne" heavily influenced the first song Sinai wrote, "Shir Prida". The success of his 2003 Cohen-influenced single "Makhur" has influenced his 2007 Leonard Cohen tribute tour. His 1992 Shmu'ot Al Geshem album had a much more rock and guitar-oriented sound than his other albums.

His most successful album Tzel Kaved was influenced by Johnny Cash and Kris Kristofferson.

== Personal life ==
Sinai has been divorced five times and has five children.

== Discography ==
=== Studio albums ===
- Arik Sinai (1980)
- Tzel Kaved (1981, "Heavy Shadow")
- Shirim Khozrim (1982, "Songs That Return" / Evergreens A)
- BeSof Maagal (1983, "At the End of a Circle")
- Shalom Lakh Tikva Atzuva (1985, "Goodbye to You Sad Hope")
- Akhshav (1987, "Now")
- Shirim Khozrim Bet (1989, "Songs That Return II" / Evergreens B)
- Shmu'ot Al Geshem (1992, "Rumors of Rain")
- Nohav Ad Shenamut (2003, "We'll Love Until We Die")
- Holekh Uva (2011, "Going & Coming")

=== Compilation albums ===
- Kmo Lifney Shanim (1994, "Like Many Years Ago" / Greatest Hits)
- HaMeytav (2002, "The Best Of")

=== Non-album singles ===
- "Vals Akharon" (2016, "Last Waltz")
- "Shamayim" (2024, "Sky", from HaKokhav HaBa)

=== Tours ===
- Arik Sinai Shar Leonard Cohen (2007, "Arik Sinai Sings Leonard Cohen")
