= Which Witch =

Musical written by Benedicte Adrian and Ingrid Bjørnov

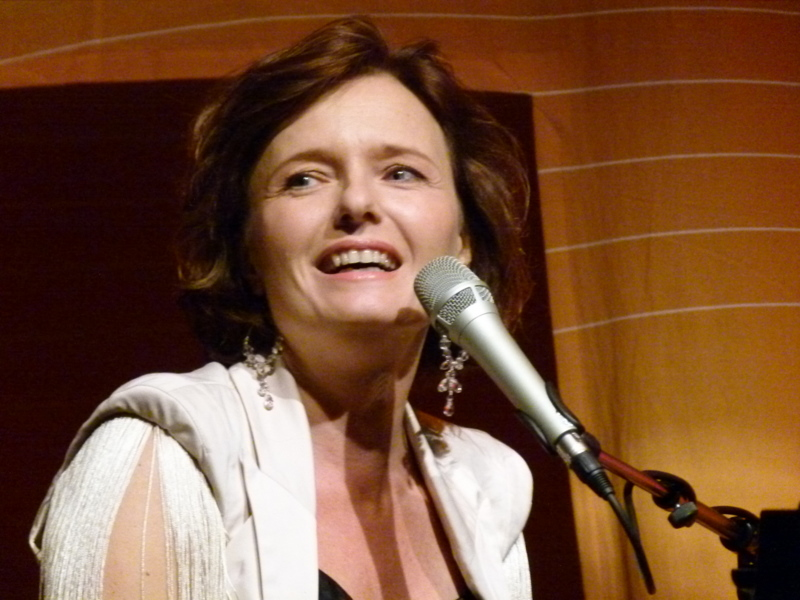
Ingrid Bjørnov, cowriter of Which Witch

Which Witch is a musical written by Norwegian singers/composers Benedicte Adrian and Ingrid Bjørnov.

The storyline for Which Witch was derived from the witch finder's manual Malleus Maleficarum, and the original script was written by Adrian and Bjørnov's manager Ole A. Sørli. The lyrics of the early concert versions were written by Helen Hampton in collaboration with Adrian, Bjørnov and Sørli.

The first performance was in Grieghallen, Bergen on May 27, 1987, with Adrian playing the female lead, and Bjørnov as musical director. The material was constantly developed throughout a period of eight years, resulting in several national and international tours presenting continuously updated concert versions of the musical.

The "Operamusical" Which Witch opened at the Piccadilly Theatre in London on October 22, 1992 and ran for 76 performances, after a critical savaging. It has been described as "the second worst West End musical of all time", a "bizarre musical", and "a dire rock opera".

The London version was followed by a rather more successful Norwegian tour, and further performances of a Norwegian version in Holmenkollen, Oslo during the summer of 1994.

Which Witch has, since its premiere in May 1987, been performed a total of 142 times in concert version in the following countries: Norway, Canada, USA, the Netherlands, England, Spain, Finland, Sweden and Denmark. The total attendance figure is approx. 276,000.

== Recordings ==
- Which Witch—the original studio album (released 1987).
- Which Witch på Slottsfjellet live concert double album (released 1990).
- Which Witch—London Cast Album (released 1993).

Total record sales are in excess of 110,000 units. Licensed productions have been staged in several European countries.
