= Erika Norwich =

Norwegian singer (born 1999)

- Born: 20 October 1999 (age 27); Trondheim, Norway
- Genre: Pop
- Occupations: Singer; songwriter

Erika Norwich (born 20 October 1999) is a Norwegian singer and songwriter.

== Early life ==
Norwich was born on 20 October 1999 in Trondheim.

== Musical career ==
In 2016, as a 16-year-old, Norwich took part in the TV show Idol, in which she reached the semi-finals. In 2018, she studied at the Liverpool Institute for Performing Arts for around a year before dropping out and returning to Norway. At the Melodi Grand Prix 2020, the Norwegian preliminary round for the Eurovision Song Contest, she took on a part in the song "Vertigo" performed by Thomas Løseth, without herself being listed as a participant. Through her presence on social media such as TikTok, where she presents not only her music but also other videos from her life, her popularity began to increase. With their song "Til lillebror", Norwich entered the Norwegian singles charts for the first time in 2022. Her debut EP was Fra hjertet til hodet og ut, released in October 2023. In January 2024, it was announced that she would take part in the Melodi Grand Prix 2024 together with Super Rob (later revealed to be Gaute Ormåsen) and the song "My AI". With this song she was able to enter the Norwegian singles charts again.

== Musical style ==
Norwich sings in Norwegian and English. Over time she began to write her Norwegian-language songs in her dialect. She cited singer Synne Vo, who also sings in a dialect, as her inspiration.

== Personal Life ==
On TikTok she has admitted to doing drugs on several occasions, posting videos and pictures of herself on the platform clearly intoxicated. Erika has a lot of young followers

Erika has admitted she has been convicted of assault

Erika has been vocal about her many struggles with borderline personality disorder, but also neurodivergence. For Halloween 2026 she had a homemade costume of a Balidax bottle, generic for the brand medication Elvanse/lisdexamfetamine. This brought some skepticism due to her young following but, also previous statements about illicit stimulant use.

In October 2026 she is pictured leaving serial rapist Marius Borg Høiby residence in his car, citing: “After being there, seeing and hearing everything, I can’t say anything other than that I actually relate to Marius a lot.”

== Discography ==
=== Extended plays ===
List of EPs, with selected details
Title	Details
Fra hjertet til hodet og ut	Released: 20 October 2023; Label: EE Media AS / Sony Music Entertainment; Formats: Digital download, streaming

=== Singles ===
==== As lead artist ====
Title	Year	Peak chart positions	Certifications	Album or EP
Title	Year	NOR	Certifications	Album or EP
"Shadow"	2016	—		Non-album singles
"Ballerina"	2017	—		Non-album singles
"Running Out"	2017	—		Non-album singles
"Come Back to Me" (with Fool the Fox)	2020	—		Non-album singles
"Sekunder" (with Erik)	2021	—		Non-album singles
"Til lillebror"	2021	20		Non-album singles
"Ta mæ tebake"	2021	—		Non-album singles
"Ærlig"	2023	—		Fra hjertet til hodet og ut
"Tankebibliotek"	2023	—		Fra hjertet til hodet og ut
"Aldri helt bra, men bedre"	2023	—		Fra hjertet til hodet og ut
"Snehvit"	2023	—		Fra hjertet til hodet og ut
"Usynlig"	2023	—		Non-album singles
"My AI" (with Super Rob)	2024	9	IFPI NOR: Gold	Non-album singles
"Fuck deg" (with PandaPanda)	2024	—		Non-album singles
"E det min feil?"	2024	—		Non-album singles
"For godt te å være sant"	2024	—		Non-album singles
"I et anna liv"	2024	—		Non-album singles
"Det e forseint"	2025	53		Non-album singles
"—" denotes a recording that did not chart or was not released in that territory.

==== As featured artist ====
Title	Year	Album or EP
"Some More" (SFRNG featuring Erika Norwich)	2021	Non-album single
