= Miia (singer) =

Norwegian singer (born 1997)

- Also known as: Miia
- Born: Mia Virik Brubakken; 24 November 1997 (age 28)
- Origin: Oslo, Norway
- Genre: Pop
- Occupation: Singer
- Years active: 2011-present
- Website: miiamusic.com

Mia Virik Kristensen (born 24 November 1997), also known as MIIA, is a Norwegian singer.

== Biography ==
Miia comes from the town of Kragerø (town). She attended the music branch of high school in Tønsberg. Her uncle is the musician Joachim Rygg. As a 14-year-old, she released the song "In the Light of Love". At the age of 17, she recorded the single "Dynasty" in a Los Angeles studio. The song was featured by Billboard, among others, and was used in an episode of Keeping Up with the Kardashians. While the song gained international fame, it did not achieve a breakthrough in Norway. After school, she began studying history in Oslo. In 2018, she took part in the music show Muitte mu, broadcast on NRK, in which celebrities were supposed to learn Joik. She released her debut EP Inner Voices Speaking in November 2023.

Miia competed in Melodi Grand Prix 2024 with the song "Green Lights". She advanced from her semi-final to the grand final, where she finished 6th out of 9 finalists.

Her debut album Huldra released on 13 July 2026, taking inspiration from Scandinavian folklore.

== Musical style ==
Miia cites songs by singers Adele, Sia and Lana Del Rey as her inspiration.

== Discography ==
=== Albums ===
- 2026: Huldra

=== EPs ===
- 2023: Inner Voices Speaking

=== Singles ===
- 2016: "Dynasty"
- 2016: "Sledgehammer"
- 2018: "Beautiful Creature"
- 2019: "How to Lose Something Good"
- 2023: "Oxide"
- 2023: "Skin of a Fool"
- 2023: "Can’t Remember a Smile"
- 2023: "How Do I Love You"
- 2024: "Green Lights"
- 2025: "When I Let You Go"
- 2025: "I Can Tell A Lie"
- 2026: "Wonder Why"
- 2026: "Necessary Evil"
- 2026: "Delicious"
