= Ingrid Bjørnov =

Norwegian musician

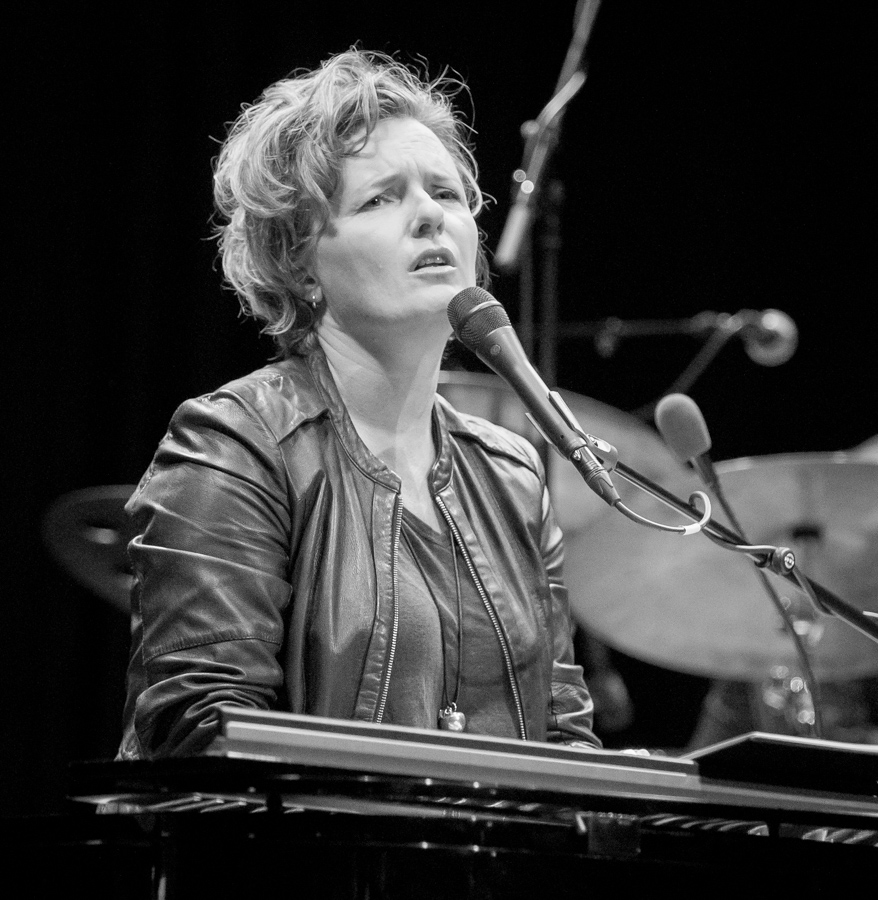
- Ingrid Bjørnov in 2017
- Born: 5 December 1963 (age 62)
- Occupations: singer, songwriter, keyboard player, composer and text writer
- Known for: Dollie de Luxe

Ingrid Bjørnov (born 5 December 1963) is a Norwegian singer, songwriter, keyboard player, composer and text writer. Her debut album Første Akt from 1980 with the duo Dollie (together with Benedicte Adrian) was awarded Spellemannprisen, and the duo represented Norway in the Eurovision Song Contest 1984. She spent seven years with the musical Which Witch, which premiered in 1987. Among her later musicals is Markus og Julie from 2007, with text by Klaus Hagerup, staged at Trøndelag Teater. Among her books are Ingrid Bjørnovs pianobok from 2005 and Lakse-enka – nødskrik fra en tørrflue from 2007. She was awarded the Leonard Statuette in 2013.
