= Fredrik Halland =

- Born: Fredrik Strand Halland; 21 November 1993 (age 32); Bergen, Norway
- Genres: R&B, Alternative pop, Avant-rock, Jazz
- Occupations: Musician, recording engineer
- Instruments: Percussion, bass guitar, guitar, keyboards, theremin, vocals
- Website: www.officialfredrikhalland.com

Fredrik Strand Halland is a Norwegian singer, songwriter, guitarist and producer based in Los Angeles.

== Early life ==
Born in Bergen, Halland began playing the guitar at a very young age. When he turned 9, he started taking lessons from guitarist Mads Eriksen, who first introduced Halland to the Blues. At twelve he performed a Stevie Ray Vaughan classic from Texas Flood in a Norwegian talent competition; in 2007 he was awarded the City of Bergen's talent prize; at 16 he won the Notodden Blues Festival contest for blues guitarists. He soon had over 100 live performances, including at South by Southwest in Austin, Texas.

== Career ==
At the age of 16 Halland moved to Los Angeles after receiving a scholarship to attend the Musicians Institute in Hollywood. He was selected as the first runner-up in Guitar Player Magazine's “Guitar Superstar 2011” competition hosted by guitarist Larry Carlton. After graduating with honors, Halland started his own production company, named after the mountains surrounding his hometown. He toured with Colbie Caillat soon after. He played guitar on Justin Bieber's "Roller Coaster" in 2013 and on Michael Jackson's posthumous album Xscape in 2014.

He took part in Melodi Grand Prix 2024, the Norwegian selection for the Eurovision Song Contest 2024, with the song "Stranded". He did not manage to qualify for the final.

== Discography ==
=== Singles ===
Single	Year	Album or EP
"Someday"	2019	Non-album singles
"Taken by You"	2019	Non-album singles
"Roots"	2019	Non-album singles
"Said and Done"	2020	Non-album singles
"Stranded"	2024	Non-album singles
