= Erik Anders Sæter =

Norwegian artist (born 1996)

- Born: 1996 (age 29–30); Storjord in Tysfjord Municipality
- Education: NTNU
- Occupations: Musician; YouTuber
- Parents: Anders Sæter (father); Ann Irene Sæter (mother)

Erik Anders Sæter (born 1996 at Storjord in Tysfjord Municipality (now part of Hamarøy Municipality)) is a Norwegian artist, YouTuber, influencer, and TV personality. Sæter is known from his participation in, among other things, Paradise Hotel in 2018 and 2021 and Farmen kjendis in 2019 and 2023. In 2019, he was presenter, together with Isabel Raad, in Veien til Pærra on TV3.

== Biography ==
Erik Sæter grew up in Storjorda, in the former Tysfjord Municipality, and is the son of local politicians Anders and Ann Irene Sæter. He was a pupil at Hamarøy School in Oppeid, and furthered his education at NTNU, from which he has a bachelor's degree in political science.

Sæter released his debut single "Unknown" in February 2019. The single reached 39th place on Spotify's top 50 list in Norway.

Together with his half-brother Erlend Elias Bragstad, he runs the podcast Erlend Elias and Erik Anders.

In recent years, Sæter has been an active social debater in matters concerning body positivism and the roles of Norwegian celebrities.

== TV appearances (excerpts) ==
- 2018: Paradise Hotel (season 10, 2nd place), TV3
- 2019: Farmen kjendis (season 3), TV 2
- 2019: Veien til Pærra, TV3
- 2019: Helt Ærlig, TV3
- 2020: Drømmehytta, TV 2 Play
- 2021: Paradise Hotel (season 14, 2nd place), TV3
- 2022: Camp Kulinaris (season 5, challenger), TV3
- 2022: Norske beefer, NRK
- 2023: Torpet kjendis (season 7), TV 2
- 2023: Farmen kjendis (season 7), TV 2

== Discography ==
- 2019 "Ukjent" (single)
- 2019 "Skyfri" (single)
- 2020 "Nostalgi" (single)
- 2020 "Gutta backer" with Johannes Magnussen (single)
- 2020 "Kongen ifra nord" with Johannes Magnussen (single)
