= Ingrid Jasmin =

Norwegian singer (born 1987)

- Born: Ingrid Jasmin Vogt Evensen; 1987 (age 38–39)
- Origin: Kragerø, Norway
- Genres: R&B; Norwegian folk; Latin urban
- Occupation: Singer

Ingrid Jasmin Vogt Evensen (born 1987), known professionally as Ingrid Jasmin, is a Norwegian singer.

== Biography ==
Vogt comes from the town of Kragerø and has ancestors from Costa Rica. She studied in Cuba and Spain. In 2021, Jasmin released her debut single Pilgrim. In October 2022, she released her debut album Luna. She won the "Open Class" category at the Norwegian music award Spellemannprisen 2022.

In January 2024, Jasmin was introduced with the song "Eya" as a participant in the Melodi Grand Prix 2024, the Norwegian preliminary round for the Eurovision Song Contest. She qualified for the final.

== Musical style ==
In her songs, Jasmin sings in Norwegian, English and Spanish. Billboard magazine described her music as inspired by Nordic folk, Latin and R&B. A review of her debut album in Aftenposten said that she merged flamenco and Norwegian folk music into "unmistakable pop music".

== Awards and honors ==
Award	Year	Category	Nominee(s)	Result	Ref.
Spellemannprisen	2022	Open Class	Luna	Won	

== Discography ==
=== Album ===
- 2023: Luna

=== Singles ===
- 2021: Pilgrim
- 2022: Rumor
- 2023: M.U.E.R.T.O
- 2023: Sorry
- 2024: Eya
