= Myra (rapper) =

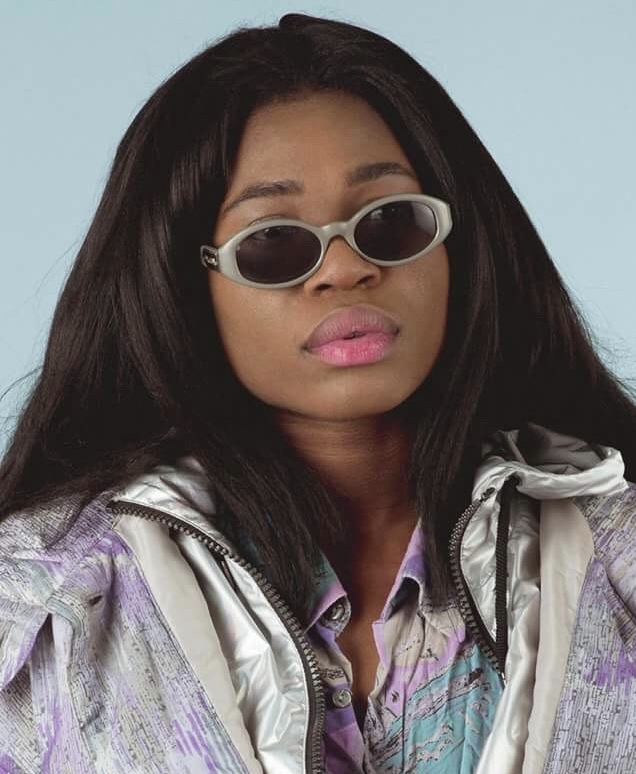

Background information
- Born: Regina Tucker; 8 December 1994 (age 30); Kenema, Sierra Leone
- Origin: Bergen, Norway
- Genres: Hip hop; R&B
- Occupation: Rapper
- Instrument: Vocals
- Years active: 2016–present
- Website: myraofficial.no

Regina Tucker (born 8 December 1994), known professionally as Myra (stylized in all caps), is a Norwegian rapper and songwriter, originally from Sandviken, Bergen, Norway. Her musical style is a mixture of alternative rap and R&B, and she has been rapping in Bergen dialect since 2016.

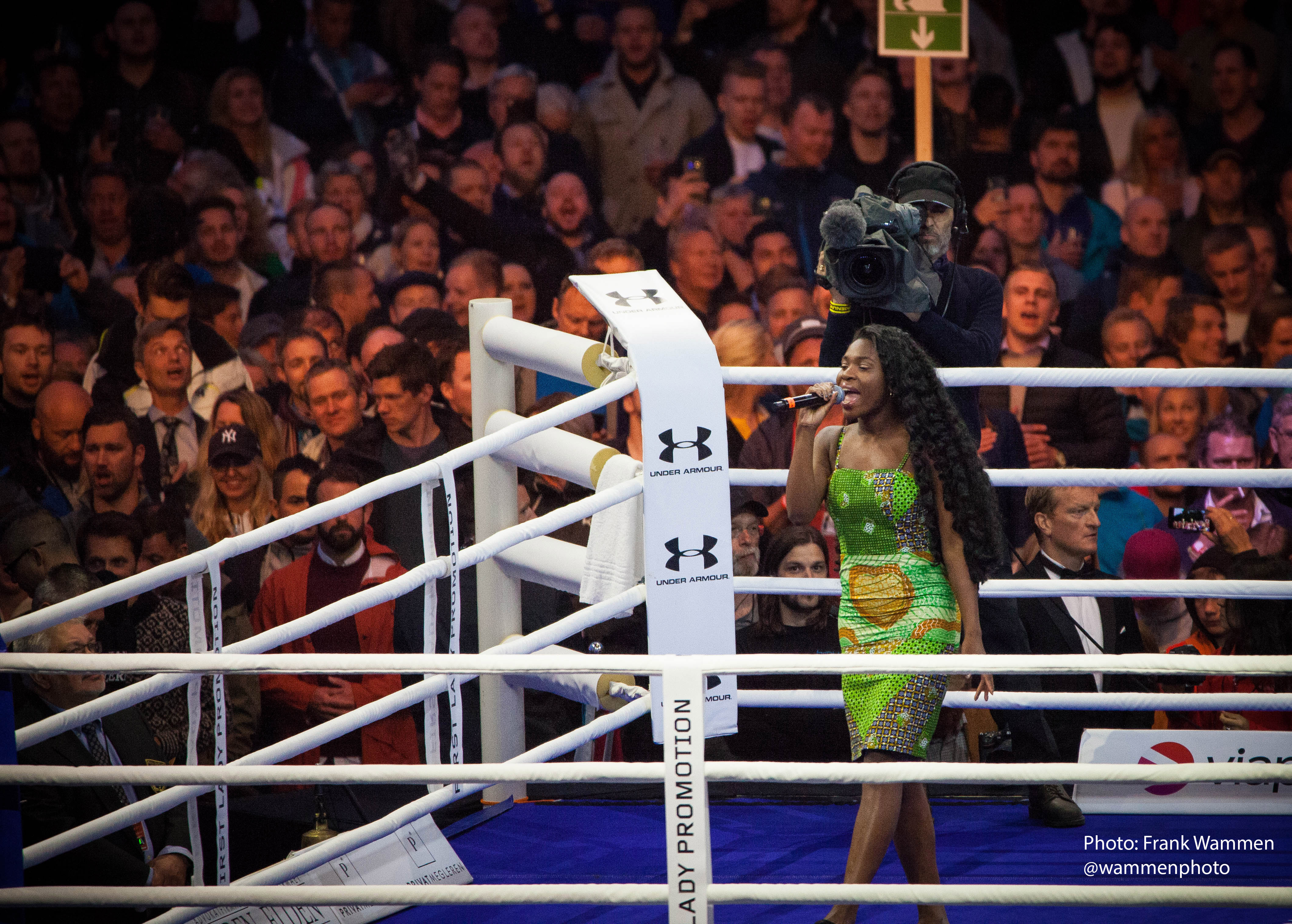
Myra performing the Bergen regional anthem "Nystemten" during the boxing event Battle of Bergen at Koengen on 9 June 2017

She competed in Melodi Grand Prix 2024, the Norwegian selection for the Eurovision Song Contest 2024, with the song "Heart on Fire". She did not manage to qualify for the final.

== Discography ==
=== Studio albums ===
List of studio albums, with selected details
Title	Details
Bokser & Ballerina	Released: 15 October 2021; Label: Oslo Records, Universal Music AS; Formats: Digital download, streaming

=== Extended plays ===
List of EPs, with selected details
Title	Details
Hver gang vi møtes 2022	Released: 18 February 2022; Label: Oslo Records, Universal Music AS; Formats: Digital download, streaming

=== Singles ===
==== As lead artist ====
Single	Year	Album or EP
"Link opp"	2017	Non-album singles
"Lever i bassen"	2017	Non-album singles
"Føler meg selv"	2018	Non-album singles
"Hola"	2018	Non-album singles
"Opplevelse og kos"	2018	Non-album singles
"Ekstremsport"	2018	Non-album singles
"Stylist"	2019	Non-album singles
"Dette er mitt navn"	2019	Non-album singles
"Motorola"	2019	Non-album singles
"Hjemløs i egen by"	2019	Non-album singles
"Hundre"	2020	Non-album singles
"Dum & deilig"	2020	Non-album singles
"Hasta La Vista" (with Kappekoff)	2020	Non-album singles
"Tørstig"	2020	Non-album singles
"Dovre faller"	2021	Bokser & Ballerina
"Svart Lamborghini"	2021	Bokser & Ballerina
"Se vekk"	2021	Bokser & Ballerina
"Kan ikke falle"	2021	Bokser & Ballerina
"DIY" (with Vin og Rap and Basmo Fam)	2022	Non-album singles
"Vi ble til i hverandres blikk"	2023	Non-album singles
"Heart on Fire"	2024	Non-album singles

==== As featured artist ====
Single	Year	Album or EP
"Tarzan & Jane" (Snow Boyz featuring Myra)	2017	Hvitt
