= Daniel Owen (singer) =

Daniel Johansen Elmrhari
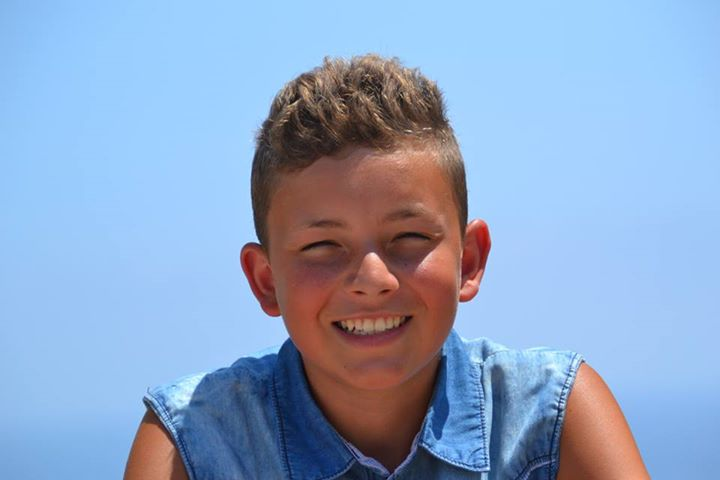

Background information
- Also known as: Daniel Owen
- Born: June 15, 1999 (age 26); Ellingsrud, Oslo, Norway
- Occupations: Singer; dancer
- Years active: 2011–present
- Labels: Universal Music; The Tune Park Records

Daniel Johansen Elmrhari (born 15 June 1999), better known as Daniel Owen, is a Norwegian singer and dancer. He won season four of Norske Talenter in 2011 and took part in Melodi Grand Prix 2021 with the song "Psycho".

== Early life ==
He was born on 15 December 1999 in Ellingsrud, a neighbourhood in the borough of Alna in the north-east part of Oslo, Norway.

== Career ==
=== 2011–2020: Norske Talenter and career beginnings ===
In 2011, Owen won the fourth season of Norske Talenter, a Norwegian talent show with a similar format to Britain's Got Talent, making it one of the Got Talent franchise programmes. On 14 February 2015, he released his debut single "Girl Gone Bad". On 6 November 2015, he released the single "With You". On 10 March 2017, he released the single "Devils & Angels". On 3 November 2017, he released the single "Vibe with Me". On 15 June 2018, he released the single "Going Wild". On 30 November 2018, he released the single "Take a Chance on Me". On 24 May 2019, he released the single "Back to Where We Started". On 8 November 2019, he released the single "Fine". On 4 December 2020, he released the single "No Plan to This".

=== 2021: Melodi Grand Prix ===
On 18 January 2021, he released the single "Psycho", on the same day he was announced as one of the acts to take part in Melodi Grand Prix 2021, he performed during the second heat, which took place on 23 January 2021, he made it to the gold duel but did not advance to the Final. He performed in the second chance round which took place on 15 February 2021, he did not advance to the Final and was eliminated from the competition.

At the time of entering Melodi Grand Prix 2021, he had been training to be a social worker, and was employed in a school.

== Discography ==
=== Singles ===
As lead artist
Title	Year	Album
"Girl Gone Bad"	2015	Non-album singles
"With You"	2015	Non-album singles
"Devils & Angels"	2017	Non-album singles
"Vibe with Me" (featuring Lenee)	2017	Non-album singles
"Going Wild"	2018	Non-album singles
"Take a Chance on Me"	2018	Non-album singles
"Back to Where We Started"	2019	Non-album singles
"Fine"	2019	Non-album singles
"No Plan to This"	2020	Non-album singles
"Psycho"	2021	Non-album singles
"Time"	2021	Non-album singles
"Dance You Off"	2021	Non-album singles
"All of the Plans…"	2021	Non-album singles
"Lowkey"	2021	Non-album singles

As featured artist
Title	Year	Album
"Nesten Love" (MAS featuring Daniel Owen)	2021	Non-album single

=== Music videos ===
Title	Year	Director
"Girl Gone Bad"	2015	Stian Andersen
"Take a Chance on Me"	2018	Mikkel Gulliksen
"Fine"	2019	Daniel Owen & Leif Inge Fosen
"No Plan to This"	2021	Daniel Owen & Leif Inge Fosen
