= Dollie de Luxe =

Norwegian pop duo

- Origin: Norway
- Genres: Pop music, Europop, Schlager, Musical
- Years active: 1980–2001
- Labels: dB, NotaBene
- Members: Benedicte Adrian; Ingrid Bjørnov

Dollie de Luxe were a Norwegian pop duo consisting of Benedicte Adrian (lead vocals) and Ingrid Bjørnov (keyboard and vocal). Their debut album Første Akt from 1980 was awarded Spellemannprisen. They represented Norway in the Eurovision Song Contest 1984 with the song "Lenge leve livet".

The duo Dollie was formed in 1980, and from 1984 called Dollie de Luxe. In 1985 they scored a Top 20 hit in France and No. 6 in Argentina with their single "Queen of the Night/Satisfaction". Their musical Which Witch premiered at Bergen International Festival in 1987. The musical was staged at a West End theatre in London in 1992, with 76 performances. In 1995 they toured with the musical Henriette og hennes siste ekte menn, and also released the album Prinsessens utvalgte with selections from the musical.

== Discography ==
=== Albums ===
- 1980: Første Akt (Nor No. 3, Gold)
- 1981: Dollies dagbok (Nor No. 10)
- 1982: First Act
- 1982: Rampelys (Nor No. 36)
- 1984: Dollie de Luxe
- 1985: Rock vs. Opera (Nor No., Silver)
- 1987: Which Witch (Silver)
- 1990: Which Witch på Slottsfjellet (Nor No. 12, Gold)
- 1995: Prinsessens utvalgte
- 1999: Adrian/Bjørnov

=== Compilation albums ===
- 2001: Dollies beste

Awards and achievements
Preceded by Jahn Teigen with "Do Re Mi"	Norway in the Eurovision Song Contest; 1984	Succeeded by Bobbysocks! with "La det swinge"
