= Benedicte Adrian =

Norwegian singer and artist (born 1963)

Benedicte Christine Adrian
- Born: 22 October 1963 (age 61); Oslo, Akershus, Norway
- Occupation(s): Singer and musician
- Spouse: Gauthier Mouton

Benedicte Christine Adrian Mouton (born 22 October 1963) is a Norwegian singer and artist. She has released material on her own, but is best known for her collaboration with Ingrid Bjørnov in the pop duo Dollie de Luxe (1980–1994). She has also distinguished herself as a solo artist for several years, with the role as "Queen of the Night" in Mozart's The Magic Flute at the Norwegian Opera. She has since sung with Bergen Oratoriekor and Bergen Philharmonic Orchestra, in addition to having participated in works like Dido and Aeneas, Peer Gynt and Olav Engelbrektsson.

In the fall of 2007, Adrian was to be seen on the TV screen as a judge on the fifth season of TV2's popular talent show Pop Idol.

Adrian and Anders Odden, under the name Mistra, competed in Melodi Grand Prix 2024, the Norwegian selection for the Eurovision Song Contest 2024, with the song "Waltz of Death".

== Discography ==
=== Albums ===
- 1980: Dollie De Luxe: Første akt - vocals - #3 in Norway
- 1981: Dollie De Luxe: Dollies dagbok - vocals - #10 in Norway
- 1982: Dollie De Luxe: First Act - vocals
- 1982: Dollie De Luxe: Rampelys - vocals - #36 in Norway
- 1984: Dollie De Luxe: Dollie De Luxe - vocals
- 1984: Dollie De Luxe: Queen of the Night / Satisfaction (single) - vocals
- 1985: Dollie De Luxe: Rock vs. Opera - vocals - #7 in Norway
- 1985: United Artists: Sammen for livet - vocals on tracks 1 and 11
- 1987: Dollie De Luxe: Which Witch - vocals
- 1995: Dollie De Luxe: Prinsessens Utvalgte - vocals
- 1999: Benedicte Adrian, Ingrid Bjørnov: Adrian / Bjørnov - vocals
- 2001 Sølvguttene: Sølvguttene synger julen inn- soloist
- 2004 Seppo: Retrofeelia - vocals
- 2008: Desember (album) - vocals - #31 in Norway
