= Ich komme =

2025 single by Erika Vikman

Single by Erika Vikman

from the EP Erikavision
- Language: Finnish; German
- English title: "I'm coming"
- Released: 16 January 2025
- Genre: Disco; electronic
- Length: 3:00
- Label: Warner Music Finland; Mökkitie Records
- Songwriters: Christel Roosberg; Jori Roosberg
- Producers: Christel Roosberg; Jori Roosberg

Erika Vikman singles chronology
"Myynnissä" (2024)	"Ich komme" (2025)	"Appetite" (2025)

Music video
- "Ich komme" on YouTube

Eurovision Song Contest 2025 entry
- Country: Finland
- Artist: Erika Vikman
- Languages: Finnish, German
- Composers: Christel Roosberg; Jori Roosberg
- Lyricists: Christel Roosberg; Jori Roosberg

Finals performance
- Semi-final result: 3rd
- Semi-final points: 115
- Final result: 11th
- Final points: 196

Entry chronology
- ◄ "No Rules!" (2024)
- "Liekinheitin" (2026) ►

Official performance video
- "Ich komme" (second semi-final) on YouTube "Ich komme" (grand final) on YouTube

"Ich komme" (German: [ˈʔɪç ˈkɔmə], transl. "I'm coming") is a song by Finnish singer Erika Vikman, and was written and produced by Christel Roosberg and Jori Roosberg (Roos+Berg). The song was released through Warner Music Finland and Mökkitie Records on 16 January 2025 and represented Finland in the Eurovision Song Contest 2025. It reached number two on the Finnish Singles Chart.

== Background and composition ==
Finland's broadcaster Yleisradio Oy (Yle) organised Uuden Musiikin Kilpailu 2025, a seven-entry competition broadcast on 8 February 2025. Uuden Musiikin Kilpailu 2025 comprised a singular grand final to select its entrant for the Eurovision Song Contest 2025, set to take place at St. Jakobshalle in Basel, Switzerland. The 2025 editions were the 14th iteration of the former and the 69th edition of the latter. Vikman was announced to compete in Uuden Musiikin Kilpailu 2025 on 8 January 2025, while her music video was released on 17 January. The winner of the final was selected by a 75/25 combination vote of televoting and juries and became "Ich komme".

"Ich komme" was written and produced by Christel Roosberg and Jori Roosberg (Roos+Berg). and combines Finnish disco and electronic music. The lyrics reflect "the joyous message of pleasure, ecstasy and a state of trance" and its structure reflects sexual pleasure and reaching orgasm. It was one of two songs in the contest to be about ejaculating, the other being "Milkshake Man" by Australia's Go-Jo, and was described by PinkNews as one of "several" to be "laden thick with double entendre" including Miriana Conte's "Kant", which had to be reworked to "Serving", to omit the phrase "serving kant" as per British broadcasting rules.

== Promotion ==
To promote "Ich komme" before the Eurovision Song Contest 2025, Vikman announced her intent to participate in various Eurovision pre-parties. It was first announced that she will be performing at the London Eurovision Party 2025 on 13 April 2025 to be held at Here at Outernet. Further, Vikman performed at Eurovision in Concert 2025 held at AFAS Live Arena in Amsterdam on 5 April 2025. She also participated at PrePartyES 2025 on 19 April 2025 held at Sala La Riviera in Madrid.

In addition, Vikman conducted a promotional tour for her participation in the contest, having done press events in Sweden in March and Italy in April. She also performed the song on the Dutch television show Eva the day after her promotion in Italy. On 24 April 2025, Vikman performed at the Finnish embassy in Berlin, Germany.

== Critical reception ==
Professional ratings
Review scores
Source	Rating
The Times	4/5 stars
Yle	10/10

"Ich komme" was met with critical acclaim from music critics. Eva Frantz from Yle gave the song a 10/10, calling it as "something feminine, bold and challenging on the Eurovision stage". Jon O’Brien from Vulture ranked the song fourth, describing the track as driven by "pummeling techno beats, chorus-line chants, and 2 Unlimited–esque arcade synths," arguing that these elements "compel without all the sledgehammer innuendo" found in similar dance productions.

Angelica Frey from The Guardian dubbed the song as one of the ten best Eurovision songs of 2025, calling it a track that "bursts with unrestrained hands-in-the-air energy", driven by its "four-on-the-floor beat and Eurodance instrumental". Further, The Telegraph's Ed Power listed the song among the ten Eurovision finalists to watch, describing it as an "innuendo-fueled" song that blends Benny Hill and Richard Wagner. He characterized the song as an "ode to a healthy sex life", performed by Vikman with the "fury and enthusiasm of a thousand Valkyries". Writing for Rolling Stone Australia, Kiel Egging included the song among the ten Eurovision 2025 acts to watch, describing Vikman as having a "dynamite stage presence".

In his review for CNN, Rob Picheta ranked the track third out of the 26 finalists, noting that Vikman's performance explored themes of "power, sexuality, female empowerment, and self-expression". He described the song as bold and energetic, with staging that included a large, pyrotechnic microphone, which he saw as reinforcing the song's central message. Ed Potton from The Times gave the song four out of five stars, describing it as a "libidinous electronic onslaught that puts the bang into banger".

== Eurovision ==
The Eurovision Song Contest 2025 consisted of two semi-finals held on 13 and 15 May and a final broadcast on 17 May 2025. During the allocation draw held on 28 January 2025, Finland was drawn to compete in the second semi-final, performing in the second half of the show. Vikman was later drawn to close the semi-final. Finland qualified for the final.

During a joint Instagram Live in March with Conte, Vikman stated that the European Broadcasting Union felt her performance carried too many sexual connotations and that she expected to have to tone it down.

Vikman performed a repeat of her performance in the grand final on 17 May. The song was performed 13th, ahead of the Netherlands' Claude and before Italy's Lucio Corsi. The song came eleventh in the contest.

== Track listing ==
Digital download/streaming

1. "Ich komme" – 3:00

Digital download/streaming – Roos+Berg remix

1. "Ich komme" (Roos+Berg Remix) – 3:54

== Charts ==
Chart performance for "Ich komme"
Chart (2025)	Peak position
Austria (Ö3 Austria Top 40)	48
Finland (Suomen virallinen lista)	2
Greece International (IFPI)	27
Iceland (Tónlistinn)	17
Latvia Streaming (LaIPA)	11
Lithuania (AGATA)	17
Netherlands (Single Tip)	1
Norway (VG-lista)	72
Poland (Polish Streaming Top 100)	92
Sweden (Sverigetopplistan)	38
Switzerland (Schweizer Hitparade)	56
UK Singles Downloads (Official Charts)	41
UK Singles Sales (OCC)	42

== Release history ==
Release dates and formats for "Ich komme"
Region	Date	Format(s)	Version	Label	Ref.
Various	16 January 2025	Digital download; streaming	Original	Warner; Mökkitie	
Various	18 April 2025	Digital download; streaming	Roos+Berg remix	Warner; Mökkitie	
Italy	16 May 2025	Radio airplay	Original	Warner Italy	
