= Ireland in the Eurovision Song Contest 2025 =

- Eurovision Song Contest 2025
- Participating broadcaster: Raidió Teilifís Éireann (RTÉ)
- Country: Ireland
- Selection process: Eurosong 2025
- Selection date: 7 February 2025

Competing entry
- Song: "Laika Party"
- Artist: Emmy
- Songwriters: Emmy Kristine Guttulsrud Kristiansen; Erlend Guttulsrud Kristiansen; Henrik Østlund; Larissa Tormey; Truls Marius Aarra

Placement
- Semi-final result: Failed to qualify (13th)

Participation chronology

Ireland was represented at the Eurovision Song Contest 2025 with the song "Laika Party", written by Emmy Kristine Guttulsrud Kristiansen, Erlend Guttulsrud Kristiansen, Henrik Østlund, Larissa Tormey and Truls Marius Aarra, and performed by Emmy herself. The Irish participating broadcaster, Raidió Teilifís Éireann (RTÉ), organised the national final Eurosong 2025 in order to select its entry for the contest.

Ireland was drawn to compete in the second semi-final of the Eurovision Song Contest which took place on 15 May 2025. Performing during the show in position 3, "Laika Party" was not announced among the top 10 entries of the second semi-final and therefore did not qualify to compete in the final. It was later revealed that Ireland placed 13th out of the 16 participating countries in the semi-final with 28 points.

== Background ==
Before the 2025 contest, Raidió Teilifís Éireann (RTÉ) and its predecessor national broadcasters have participated in the Eurovision Song Contest fifty-six times since RÉ's first entry in 1965. They have won the contest a record seven times in total. Their first win came in 1970, with "All Kinds of Everything" performed by Dana. Ireland holds the record for being the only country to win the contest three times in a row (in 1992, 1993, and 1994), as well as having the only three-time winner (Johnny Logan, who won in 1980 as a singer, 1987 as a singer-songwriter, and again in 1992 as a songwriter). Since 2013, only three Irish entries managed to qualify for the final: "Only Love Survives" by Ryan Dolan which placed 26th (last) in the final in 2013, "Together" by Ryan O'Shaughnessy which placed 16th in the final in 2018, and "Doomsday Blue" by Bambie Thug which placed sixth in the final in 2024, with the latter marking the country's highest placing since 2000.

As part of its duties as participating broadcaster, RTÉ organises the selection of its entry in the Eurovision Song Contest and broadcasts the event in the country. RTÉ confirmed their intentions to participate at the 2025 contest on 23 September 2024. From 2016 to 2021, RTÉ held an internal selection to choose the artist and song to represent Ireland at the contest, while RTÉ set up the national final Eurosong since 2022 to choose both the song and performer, with both the public and jury involved in the selection. For the 2025 contest, RTÉ announced the return of Eurosong.

== Before Eurovision ==
=== Eurosong 2025 ===
Eurosong 2025 was the national final format developed by RTÉ in order to select its entry for the Eurovision Song Contest 2025. It was held on 7 February 2025, once again during a special edition of The Late Late Show, broadcast on RTÉ One and RTÉ Player and hosted by Patrick Kielty. The national final was watched by 484,000 viewers in Ireland with a market share of 46%.

==== Competing entries ====
On 23 September 2024, RTÉ opened a submission period where artists and composers were able to submit their entries for the competition until 18 November 2024. At the closing of the window, 380 entries had been submitted.

The competing entries were selected by a jury panel with members appointed by RTÉ among music industry professionals and Eurovision fans and presided by head of delegation Michael Kealy, both from the received submissions and by direct invitation of established artists. Five finalists were selected from these based on the ten favourites of each jury member, and an additional one through a "fast-track" procedure. They were revealed daily between 20 and 24 January 2025 on The Ray D'Arcy Show, broadcast on RTÉ Radio 1.

Artist	Song	Songwriter(s)
Adgy	"Run into the Night"	Andrew Carr; Jennie Carr; Ivan Klymenko
Bobbi Arlo	"Powerplay"	Bobbi Arlo; Theofilos Pouzbouris
Emmy	"Laika Party"	Emmy Kristine Guttulsrud Kristiansen; Erlend Guttulsrud Kristiansen; Henrik Østlund; Larissa Tormey; Truls Marius Aarra
Niyl	"Growth"	Niall O'Halloran
Reylta	"Fire"	Caoimhe Glynn; Cian O'Donoghue; Ryan O'Shaughnessy
Samantha Mumba	"My Way"	Brandon Avery Smith; Samantha Mumba

==== Final ====
The final of Eurosong 2025 took place at the RTÉ Television Centre on 7 February 2025. The results were determined by a combination of votes from a national jury, an international jury and a televote – each awarding sets of 2, 4, 6, 8, 10 and 12 points – with the latter taking precedence in the event of a tie in the first place. The international jury panel consisted of Sammarinese head of delegation Alessandro Capicchioni, Australian executive producer Emily Griggs of SBS, Swedish choreographer Fredrik Rydman and Serbian music manager Milica Fajgelj, while the national jury panel consisted of music curator Caroline Henry, drummer Jimmy Rainsford of the band Picture This, presenter, actor, musician and singer Kathryn McKiernan and RTÉ 2fm presenter Bláthnaid Treacy. The televote points were announced by James Patrice, with a panel consisting of Laura Fox, Bambie Thug, Arthur Gourounlian and Donal Skehan providing comments at the end of each performance. During the show, Irish Eurovision winners Linda Martin (1992), Niamh Kavanagh (1993) and Eimear Quinn (1996) performed the 2023 winning song "Tattoo" as a guest act. Emmy with "Laika Party" was proclaimed the winner with a total of 34 points, having received the top score from both the national jury and the public vote.

Final – 7 February 2025
R/O	Artist	Song	Jury		Televote	Total	Place
R/O	Artist	Song	Intl.	National	Televote	Total	Place
1	Adgy	"Run into the Night"	2	2	6	10	6
2	Bobbi Arlo	"Powerplay"	6	6	8	20	3
3	Reylta	"Fire"	8	8	2	18	5
4	Samantha Mumba	"My Way"	12	10	4	26	2
5	Niyl	"Growth"	4	4	10	18	4
6	Emmy	"Laika Party"	10	12	12	34	1

=== Calls for boycott ===
On 8 May 2025, more than 350 independent Irish television and film producers signed an open letter urging the European Broadcasting Union (EBU) to reconsider Israel's participation in the contest. The letter came in response to a statement made by Eurovision director Martin Green, who defended the EBU's decision to allow Israel to remain in the competition. The following day, a protest outside RTÉ in Dublin urged the broadcaster to boycott the contest over Israel's participation, citing alleged war crimes in Gaza and accusing Israel of using the contest to "culture wash" its actions. The demonstration featured actor Stephen Rea, several artists, activists, and union representatives. Protesters referenced the suspension of Russia and Belarus as precedent and noted support from over 70 former Eurovision contestants. While RTÉ Director-General Kevin Bakhurst said that it would not pull out from the contest, he confirmed that he, along with RTÉ's Director of Video, Steve Carson, had held a meeting with the EBU regarding Israel’s participation.

== At Eurovision ==
The Eurovision Song Contest 2025 took place at St. Jakobshalle in Basel, Switzerland, and consisted of two semi-finals held on the respective dates of 13 and 15 May and the final on 17 May 2025. During the allocation draw held on 28 January 2025, Ireland was drawn to compete in the second semi-final, performing in the first half of the show.

At the end of the show, Ireland was not announced among the top 10 entries in the second semi-final and therefore failed to qualify to compete in the final.

=== Voting ===
==== Points awarded to Ireland ====
Points awarded to Ireland (Semi-final 2)
Points	Televote
12 points	
10 points	
8 points	
7 points	United Kingdom
6 points	Malta
5 points	
4 points	Latvia
3 points	
2 points	Australia; Denmark; Finland; Lithuania; Luxembourg
1 point	Rest of the World

==== Points awarded by Ireland ====
Points awarded by Ireland (Semi-final 2)
Points	Televote
12 points	Israel
10 points	Lithuania
8 points	Latvia
7 points	Finland
6 points	Austria
5 points	Denmark
4 points	Malta
3 points	Australia
2 points	Luxembourg
1 point	Greece

Points awarded by Ireland (Final)
Points	Televote	Jury
12 points	Poland	Austria
10 points	Israel	Netherlands
8 points	Lithuania	France
7 points	Ukraine	Israel
6 points	Estonia	Malta
5 points	Finland	Sweden
4 points	Austria	Finland
3 points	Latvia	Greece
2 points	Sweden	United Kingdom
1 point	Spain	Armenia

==== Detailed voting results ====
Each participating broadcaster assembles a five-member jury panel consisting of music industry professionals who are citizens of the country they represent. Each jury, and individual jury member, is required to meet a strict set of criteria regarding professional background, as well as diversity in gender and age. No member of a national jury was permitted to be related in any way to any of the competing acts in such a way that they cannot vote impartially and independently. The individual rankings of each jury member as well as the nation's televoting results were released shortly after the grand final.

The following members comprised the Irish jury:

- Dermont McEvoy
- Edward Porter
- Kofi Appiah
- Helen Jordan Guthrie
- Tara Murray

Detailed voting results from Ireland (Semi-final 2)
R/O	Country	Televote	
R/O	Country	Rank	Points
01	Australia	8	3
02	Montenegro	15	
03	Ireland		
04	Latvia	3	8
05	Armenia	12	
06	Austria	5	6
07	Greece	10	1
08	Lithuania	2	10
09	Malta	7	4
10	Georgia	13	
11	Denmark	6	5
12	Czechia	11	
13	Luxembourg	9	2
14	Israel	1	12
15	Serbia	14	
16	Finland	4	7

Detailed voting results from Ireland (Final)
R/O	Country	Jury							Televote	
R/O	Country	Juror A	Juror B	Juror C	Juror D	Juror E	Rank	Points	Rank	Points
01	Norway	12	12	17	21	17	19		23	
02	Luxembourg	13	10	15	12	7	14		24	
03	Estonia	10	23	3	10	26	11		5	6
04	Israel	23	2	20	4	3	4	7	2	10
05	Lithuania	19	26	21	7	23	17		3	8
06	Spain	9	18	4	14	19	13		10	1
07	Ukraine	18	25	19	26	21	25		4	7
08	United Kingdom	17	7	5	9	9	9	2	18	
09	Austria	1	3	1	1	1	1	12	7	4
10	Iceland	24	8	16	25	12	15		14	
11	Latvia	25	24	8	22	25	22		8	3
12	Netherlands	4	1	9	2	5	2	10	16	
13	Finland	5	13	2	17	8	7	4	6	5
14	Italy	11	11	24	18	16	16		13	
15	Poland	16	21	12	16	20	23		1	12
16	Germany	14	22	23	11	15	21		11	
17	Greece	8	20	11	3	11	8	3	19	
18	Armenia	15	14	22	6	4	10	1	25	
19	Switzerland	7	6	13	15	13	12		20	
20	Malta	2	9	7	5	18	5	6	17	
21	Portugal	21	19	25	24	24	26		21	
22	Denmark	26	15	14	23	10	20		22	
23	Sweden	3	5	18	8	6	6	5	9	2
24	France	6	4	6	13	2	3	8	15	
25	San Marino	22	16	26	20	22	24		26	
26	Albania	20	17	10	19	14	18		12	
