= Australia in the Eurovision Song Contest 2025 =

- Eurovision Song Contest 2025
- Participating broadcaster: Special Broadcasting Service (SBS)
- Country: Australia
- Selection process: Internal selection
- Announcement date: 25 February 2025

Competing entry
- Song: "Milkshake Man"
- Artist: Go-Jo
- Songwriters: Amy Sheppard; George Sheppard; Jason Bovino; Marty Zambotto

Placement
- Semi-final result: Failed to qualify (11th)

Participation chronology

Australia was represented at the Eurovision Song Contest 2025 with the song "Milkshake Man", written by Amy Sheppard, George Sheppard, Jason Bovino, and Marty Zambotto, and performed by Zambotto under his project Go-Jo. The Australian participating broadcaster, the Special Broadcasting Service (SBS), internally selected its entry for the contest.

Australia was drawn to compete in the second semi-final, which took place on 15 May 2025. Performing during the show in position 1, Australia was not announced among the top 10 entries of the first semi-final and therefore did not qualify to compete in the final. It was later revealed that Australia placed 11th out of the 16 participating countries in the semi-final with 41 points.

== Background ==
The Special Broadcasting Service (SBS) had broadcast the Eurovision Song Contest in Australia since 1983, and the contest had gained a cult following over that time, primarily due to the country's strong political and cultural ties with Europe. Paying tribute to this, the 2014 semi-finals included an interval act featuring Australian singer Jessica Mauboy. Australian singers had also participated at Eurovision representing other countries, including Olivia Newton-John (United Kingdom 1974), two-time winner Johnny Logan (Ireland 1980 and 1987), Gina G (United Kingdom 1996), and Jane Comerford as lead singer of Texas Lightning (Germany 2006).

The European Broadcasting Union (EBU) invited SBS to participate in the contest representing Australia for the first time in 2015, as a guest participant to celebrate the 60th edition of the event, being granted automatic entry into the final along with the "Big Five" (France, Germany, Italy, Spain, and the United Kingdom) and the host country (Austria). It had since competed in every edition of the contest, i.e. nine times, being required to qualify from its semi-final since 2016. In 2024, it entered the song "One Milkali (One Blood)" by Electric Fields, which failed to qualify for the final, ending in 11th place in the first semi-final with 41 points.

== Before Eurovision ==
=== Internal selection ===
On 25 February 2025, SBS announced that it had internally selected the Australian entrant and entry for the contest, and revealed them that day: the entrant was Go-Jo with the song "Milkshake Man". The song was written by Go-Jo alongside Amy Sheppard, George Sheppard, and Jason Bovino, all current or former members of the band Sheppard, which competed in the first edition of Eurovision – Australia Decides in 2019 with "On My Way".

== At Eurovision ==
The Eurovision Song Contest 2025 took place at St. Jakobshalle in Basel, Switzerland, and consisted of two semi-finals held on the respective dates of 13 and 15 May and the final on 17 May 2025. During the allocation draw held on 28 January 2025, Australia was drawn to compete in the second semi-final, performing in the first half of the show. Go-Jo was later drawn to open the semi-final. At the end of the show, the country was not announced among the 10 qualifiers, and Australia did not qualify for the final.

=== Voting ===
==== Points awarded to Australia ====
Points awarded to Australia (Semi-final 2)
Points	Televote
12 points	
10 points	
8 points	
7 points	
6 points	Latvia; Lithuania
5 points	Finland; Malta; United Kingdom
4 points	
3 points	Denmark; Ireland
2 points	Austria; Germany; Rest of the World
1 point	Czechia; Georgia

==== Points awarded by Australia ====
Points awarded by Australia (Semi-final 2)
Points	Televote
12 points	Israel
10 points	Finland
8 points	Malta
7 points	Latvia
6 points	Denmark
5 points	Greece
4 points	Luxembourg
3 points	Austria
2 points	Ireland
1 point	Lithuania

Points awarded by Australia (Final)
Points	Televote	Jury
12 points	Israel	Greece
10 points	Finland	Latvia
8 points	Sweden	Malta
7 points	Greece	Austria
6 points	Estonia	Sweden
5 points	Malta	Poland
4 points	Albania	Denmark
3 points	Austria	Estonia
2 points	Latvia	Finland
1 point	Poland	Switzerland

==== Detailed voting results ====
Each participating broadcaster assembles a five-member jury panel consisting of music industry professionals who are citizens of the country they represent. Each jury, and individual jury member, is required to meet a strict set of criteria regarding professional background, as well as diversity in gender and age. No member of a national jury was permitted to be related in any way to any of the competing acts in such a way that they cannot vote impartially and independently. The individual rankings of each jury member as well as the nation's televoting results were released shortly after the grand final.

The following members comprised the Australian jury:

- Andrew Lambrou (represented Cyprus in the Eurovision Song Contest 2023)
- Robbie Buck
- Claire Rebecca Howell
- Kylie Alexandra Burtland
- Simone Nicoloso Dow

Detailed voting results from Australia (Semi-final 2)
R/O	Country	Televote	
R/O	Country	Rank	Points
01	Australia		
02	Montenegro	15	
03	Ireland	9	2
04	Latvia	4	7
05	Armenia	12	
06	Austria	8	3
07	Greece	6	5
08	Lithuania	10	1
09	Malta	3	8
10	Georgia	13	
11	Denmark	5	6
12	Czechia	11	
13	Luxembourg	7	4
14	Israel	1	12
15	Serbia	14	
16	Finland	2	10

Detailed voting results from Australia (Final)
R/O	Country	Jury							Televote	
R/O	Country	Juror A	Juror B	Juror C	Juror D	Juror E	Rank	Points	Rank	Points
01	Norway	23	14	21	18	13	20		22	
02	Luxembourg	5	15	20	15	18	16		17	
03	Estonia	17	9	1	13	9	8	3	5	6
04	Israel	21	13	19	19	19	22		1	12
05	Lithuania	26	12	2	9	11	11		20	
06	Spain	13	16	8	17	20	17		15	
07	Ukraine	24	23	26	11	21	24		21	
08	United Kingdom	14	17	9	12	4	13		19	
09	Austria	7	2	18	3	7	4	7	8	3
10	Iceland	25	21	3	16	25	15		11	
11	Latvia	6	4	4	2	8	2	10	9	2
12	Netherlands	16	10	25	23	24	19		16	
13	Finland	9	8	12	6	5	9	2	2	10
14	Italy	20	25	11	22	22	21		14	
15	Poland	15	6	10	5	2	6	5	10	1
16	Germany	10	22	13	25	12	18		12	
17	Greece	4	1	16	7	1	1	12	4	7
18	Armenia	19	19	17	24	14	23		23	
19	Switzerland	3	7	14	10	15	10	1	24	
20	Malta	1	20	15	4	3	3	8	6	5
21	Portugal	18	24	23	21	23	25		25	
22	Denmark	2	11	22	8	6	7	4	13	
23	Sweden	11	5	5	1	17	5	6	3	8
24	France	12	3	6	20	16	12		18	
25	San Marino	22	26	24	26	26	26		26	
26	Albania	8	18	7	14	10	14		7	4
