= The Go-Jo Variety Show =

Studio album by Go-Jo
- Released: 26 June 2026
- Genre: Pop
- Length: 33:21
- Label: Chugg
- Producers: Jason Bovino; Jackson Foote; Dave Hammer; Alex Koste; Minus Manus; Josh Ocean; Ned Philpot; George Sheppard; Max Styler; Chris Whitehall; Cyrus Villanueva; Marty Zambotto

Singles from The Go-Jo Variety Show
- 1. "Mrs. Hollywood" Released: 20 March 2023; 2. "Loverman" Released: 28 November 2023; 3. "Milkshake Man" Released: 25 February 2025; 4. "Apetite" Released: 28 October 2025; 5. "Supersonic" Released: 30 January 2026; 6. "Nervous" Released: 17 April 2026; 7. "Sweat" Released: 8 May 2026

The Go-Jo Variety Show is the debut studio album by the Australian singer-songwriter Go-Jo. The album was released on 26 June 2026 by Chugg Music, and peaked at number 48 on the ARIA Charts.

== Reception ==
Kyriakos Tsinivits from AussieVision said "The Go-Jo Variety Show lives up to its name, delivering a vibrant collection of pop tracks packed with catchy hooks, playful lyricism and the infectious energy fans have come to expect".

Ben Avery from Gig Shack said "Musically, the record bounces between glossy pop, funk, indie flourishes and disco grooves without ever feeling disjointed. Instead, it mirrors the personality Go-Jo has cultivated online: playful, unpredictable and impossible to dislike.".

== Track listing ==
All lyrics are written by Marty Zambotto, except "Milkshake Man" and "Appetite" (lyrics by Zambotto, Jason Bovino, Amy Sheppard, and George Sheppard).

The Go-Jo Variety Show track listing
No.	Title	Music	Producer(s)	Length
1.	"Welcome to the Go-Jo Variety Show"	Marty Zambotto	Zambotto	0:49
2.	"Supersonic"	Zambotto; Nick Furlong; Nicholas Ruth; Sean Van Vleet; Chris Whitehall	Max Styler; Whitehall; Zambotto^{[c]}; Jason Bovino^{[c]}	2:56
3.	"Loverman"	Zambotto; Alex Koste	Zambotto	2:26
4.	"You Got It, Hey"	Zambotto; Dave Hammer; Evan Klar	Zambotto; Bovino; Hammer	2:31
5.	"Mrs. Hollywood"	Zambotto	Zambotto	2:23
6.	"Commercial Break - Smart Glasses"	Zambotto	Zambotto	1:04
7.	"Turn the Music Down"	Zambotto; Jackson Foote; Koste; Ryan Sorenson	Zambotto; Foote; Koste	3:19
8.	"Rainbow Woman"	Zambotto	Zambotto; Bovino; Josh Ocean	2:48
9.	"Sunday"	Zambotto; Ned Philpot; Cyrus Villanueva	Zambotto; Dazy; Villanueva	2:37
10.	"Nervous"	Zambotto	Minus Manus; Bovino^{[c]}	2:19
11.	"Commercial Break - Go-Go Pop"	Zambotto	Zambotto	1:20
12.	"Milkshake Man"	Zambotto; Bovino; Amy Sheppard; George Sheppard	Zambotto; Bovino; G. Sheppard	2:52
13.	"Appetite" (with Erika Vikman)	Zambotto; Bovino; A. Sheppard; G. Sheppard	Bovino; G. Sheppard	2:47
14.	"Sweat"	Zambotto; Bovino; A. Sheppard; G. Sheppard	Zambotto; Bovino; G. Sheppard	3:02
Total length:				33:21

=== Note ===
- ^{^[c]} indicates a co-producer

== Personnel ==
Credits are adapted from Tidal.

- Go-Jo – vocals
- Serge Courtois – mixing, mastering (track 2)
- Alex Koste – engineering (2)
- Jason Bovino – mixing (4, 7–9, 14)
- Amy Sheppard – background vocals (12)
- George Sheppard – background vocals (12)
- Emma Sheppard – background vocals (12)
- Jenaya Okpalaze – background vocals (12)
- Erika Vikman – vocals (13)

== Charts ==
Weekly chart performance for The Go-Jo Variety Show
Chart (2026)	Peak position
Australian Albums (ARIA)	48
