= Finland in the Eurovision Song Contest 2025 =

- Eurovision Song Contest 2025
- Participating broadcaster: Yleisradio (Yle)
- Country: Finland
- Selection process: Uuden Musiikin Kilpailu 2025
- Selection date: 8 February 2025

Competing entry
- Song: "Ich komme"
- Artist: Erika Vikman
- Songwriters: Christel Roosberg; Jori Roosberg

Placement
- Semi-final result: Qualified (3rd, 115 points)
- Final result: 11th, 196 points

Participation chronology

Finland was represented at the Eurovision Song Contest 2025 with the song "Ich komme", written by Christel Roosberg and Jori Roosberg, and performed by Erika Vikman. The Finnish participating broadcaster, Yleisradio (Yle), organised the national final Uuden Musiikin Kilpailu 2025 in order to select its entry for the contest.

Finland was drawn to compete in the second semi-final of the Eurovision Song Contest which took place on 15 May 2025 and was later selected to perform in position 16. At the end of the show, "Ich komme" was announced among the top 10 entries of the second semi-final and hence qualified to compete in the final, marking Finland's fifth consecutive qualification. It was later revealed that Finland placed third out of the sixteen participating countries in the semi-final with 115 points. In the final, Finland performed in position 13 and placed eleventh out of the 26 participating countries, scoring a total of 196 points.

== Background ==
Prior to the 2025 contest, Yleisradio (Yle) has participated in the Eurovision Song Contest representing Finland fifty-seven times since its first entry in 1961. It had won the contest once in 2006 with the song "Hard Rock Hallelujah" performed by Lordi. In the 2024 contest, "No Rules!" performed by Windows95man managed to qualify Finland to the final and placed nineteenth.

As part of its duties as participating broadcaster, Yle organises the selection of its entry in the Eurovision Song Contest and broadcasts the event in the country. Yle had been selecting its entries for the contest through national final competitions that had varied in format over the years. Between 1961 and 2011, a selection show that was often titled Suomen euroviisukarsinta highlighted that the purpose of the program was to select a song for Eurovision. Since 2012, the broadcaster had organised the selection show Uuden Musiikin Kilpailu (UMK), which focuses on showcasing new music with the winning song being selected as the Finnish Eurovision entry for that year. Yle confirmed their intentions to participate at the 2025 contest on 3 June 2024, announcing that its entry would again be selected through Uuden Musiikin Kilpailu.

== Before Eurovision ==
=== Uuden Musiikin Kilpailu 2025 ===
Uuden Musiikin Kilpailu 2025 was the fourteenth edition of Uuden Musiikin Kilpailu (UMK), the music competition organised by Yle to select its entries for the Eurovision Song Contest. The competition consisted of a final on 8 February 2025, held at Nokia Arena in Tampere and hosted by Sanni and Jasmin Beloued.

==== Competing entries ====
A submission period was opened by Yle which lasted between 19 August 2024 and 25 August 2024. At least one of the writers and the lead singer(s) had to hold Finnish citizenship or live in Finland permanently in order for the entry to qualify to compete. A panel of nine experts appointed by Yle alongside five audience juries selected seven entries for the competition from 485 received submissions, a new record during the current format of the competition. The experts were Tapio Hakanen (Head of Music at YleX), Aija Puurtinen (lecturer at Sibelius Academy and UMK vocal coach), Amie Borgar (Head of Music at Yle X3M and Yle Vega), Johan Lindroos (Head of Music at Yle Radio Suomi), Katri Norrlin (music editor at YleX), Samuli Väänänen (Senior Editor at Spotify), Jani Juntunen (Head of Radio Music at Nelonen Media), Saara Everi (Head of Marketing at PME Records) and Marcus Sjöström (Head of Music at Radio NRJ Finland). The competing entries were announced in a televised programme on 8 January 2025, hosted by Mikko Silvennoinen, Eva Frantz, Jasmin Beloued, Katri Norrlin and Sanni, while their music videos were released between 9 and 17 January.

On 22 January 2025, it was announced that One Morning Left had been disqualified due to a contract violation; the band published a statement on the same day, announcing it was being disbanded due to child grooming allegations made against its lead vocalist, Mika Lahti. Yle stated that they would not be replaced.

Key: Entry disqualified

Artist	Song	Songwriter(s)
Costee	"Sekaisin"	Jussi Tiainen; Teemu Javanainen; Tomi Tamminen
Erika Vikman	"Ich komme"	Christel Roosberg; Jori Roosberg
Goldielocks	"Made Of"	Ella Mäntynen; Lauri Mäntynen; Topi Kilpinen
Neea River	"Nightmares"	Ilkka Wirtanen; Neea Jokinen; Petri Alanko
Nelli Matula	"Hitaammin hautaan"	Antti Riihimäki; Kaisa Korhonen; Nelli Matula
~~One Morning Left~~	~~"Puppy"~~	Johannes Naukkarinen; Juuso Turkki; Leevi Luoto; Mika Lahti; Saku Ahola
Viivi	"Aina"	Antti Riihimäki; Emma Johansson; Joonas Keronen; Lauri Halavaara; Viivi Korhonen

==== Final ====
The final took place on 8 February 2025. "Ich komme" performed by Erika Vikman was selected as the winner by a combination of public votes (75%) and seven international jury groups from Croatia, Estonia, Lithuania, the Netherlands, San Marino, Spain, and Switzerland (25%). The viewers had a total of 882 points to award, while the juries had a total of 294 points to award. Each jury group distributed their points as follows: 2, 4, 6, 8, 10 and 12 points. The viewer vote was based on the percentage of votes each song achieved through the following voting methods: telephone, SMS and app voting. For example, if a song gains 17.5% of the viewer vote, then that entry would be awarded 17.5% of 882 points rounded to the nearest integer: 154 points. A record total of 342,543 votes were cast during the show: 68,539 votes through telephone and SMS and 274,004 votes through the Yle app.

In addition to the performances of the competing entries, the show was opened by Windows95man and Henri Piispanen performing "What’s My Name", their 2024 entry "No Rules!", and "Paperclip". Interval acts included host Sanni performing a medley of "Roomaan", "Prinsessoja ja astronautteja", "Mielenmaisemat", "Jacuzzi", and "2080-luvulla", and Keira, Laura Voutilainen, Annika Eklund, Eini, Bess, and Linda Lampenius performing "Shanghain valot", which was originally performed by Eklund as a competing entry in Euroviisut 2006, Finland's national selection for that year's Eurovision.

Final – 8 February 2025
R/O	Artist	Song	Jury	Televote			Total	Place
R/O	Artist	Song	Jury	Votes	Percentage	Points	Total	Place
1	Costee	"Sekaisin"	40	16,700	4.87%	43	83	6
2	Neea River	"Nightmares"	24	23,302	6.80%	60	84	5
3	Goldielocks	"Made Of"	74	88,937	25.96%	229	303	2
4	Viivi	"Aina"	38	38,837	11.33%	100	138	3
5	Nelli Matula	"Hitaammin hautaan"	50	34,177	9.97%	88	138	4
6	Erika Vikman	"Ich komme"	68	140,590	41.04%	362	430	1

Detailed international jury votes
R/O	Song	Croatia	Netherlands	Lithuania	San Marino	Spain	Estonia	Switzerland	Total
R/O	Song	Croatia	Netherlands	Lithuania	San Marino	Spain	Estonia	Switzerland	Total
1	"Sekaisin"	6	10	6	4	6	6	2	40
2	"Nightmares"	8	4	2	2	2	2	4	24
3	"Made Of"	10	12	12	10	12	10	8	74
4	"Aina"	2	8	4	6	4	4	10	38
5	"Hitaammin hautaan"	4	2	10	12	8	8	6	50
6	"Ich komme"	12	6	8	8	10	12	12	68
International jury spokespersons
Croatia – Baby Lasagna; Netherlands – Jesse Wijnans; Lithuania – Silvester Belt; San Marino – Alessandra Busignani; Spain – Luis Mesa Cabello; Estonia – Tommy Cash; Switzerland – Mélanie Freymond

==== Broadcasts and ratings ====
The competition was watched by an average of 1.48 million viewers in Finland (0.236 more than in 2024), with a peak viewership of 2.27 million, corresponding to over 40% of the Finnish population. This made 2025 the most watched edition of UMK since its establishment in 2012.

Local and international broadcasters of Uuden Musiikin Kilpailu 2025
Country	Broadcaster	Channel(s)	Commentator(s)
Finland	Yle	Yle TV1	Mikko Silvennoinen (Finnish); Eva Frantz and Johan Lindroos (Swedish); Jaakko Oleander-Turja (English); Levan Tvaltvadze (Russian); Galyna Sergeyeva (Ukrainian); Miguel Peltomaa, Silva Belghiti and Silja Ruonala (Finnish Sign Language); Robin Hänninen (Finland-Swedish Sign Language); Linda Tammela (Northern Sami); Heli Huovinen (Inari Sami)
Finland	Yle	Yle Areena	Mikko Silvennoinen (Finnish); Eva Frantz and Johan Lindroos (Swedish); Jaakko Oleander-Turja (English); Levan Tvaltvadze (Russian); Galyna Sergeyeva (Ukrainian); Miguel Peltomaa, Silva Belghiti and Silja Ruonala (Finnish Sign Language); Robin Hänninen (Finland-Swedish Sign Language); Linda Tammela (Northern Sami); Heli Huovinen (Inari Sami)
Finland	Yle	YleX	—N/a
Finland	Yle	Yle Radio Suomi	—N/a
Finland	Yle	Yle X3M	Eva Frantz and Johan Lindroos (Swedish)
Netherlands	OutTV (Note: Also available in Belgium, France, Germany, Israel, Spain and Sweden)		GJ Kooijman and Krista Siegfrids
Spain	Ten		Luis Mesa Cabello

=== Calls for boycott ===
On 24 March 2025, Yle received a petition signed by over 10,000 members of the Finnish public and almost 500 music and cultural professionals, which demanded the exclusion of Israel from the contest due to the continuing Gaza war. The petition cited: "It is contrary to the values of the signatories that a state that practices occupation and commits genocide is given a visible opportunity to improve its image under the guise of music". Johanna Törn-Mangs, director of creative content and media at Yle, explained that it is the European Broadcasting Union (EBU) that determines who can compete in the contest, further adding, "Yle is not boycotting Eurovision because an Israeli TV company is allowed to participate in Eurovision. However, this does not mean that we accept military actions or the human suffering they cause in any situation".

== At Eurovision ==
The Eurovision Song Contest 2025 consisted of two semi-finals held on 13 and 15 May and a final broadcast on 17 May 2025. During the allocation draw held on 28 January 2025, Finland was drawn to compete in the second semi-final, performing in the second half of the show. Vikman was later drawn to close the semi-final. Finland qualified for the final. They finished in 3rd place with 115 points.

In the Grand Final, Erika Vikman performed 13th in the running order. She received 88 points from the juries and 108 points from the televote, placing her 11th in the overall standings.

=== Voting ===
==== Points awarded to Finland ====
Points awarded to Finland (Semi-final 2)
Score	Televote
12 points	
10 points	Australia; Denmark; Malta
8 points	Latvia; Serbia
7 points	Czechia; Ireland; Lithuania
6 points	Armenia; Germany; Luxembourg; Montenegro; Rest of the World
5 points	
4 points	Austria; Georgia; United Kingdom
3 points	
2 points	France; Greece; Israel
1 point	

Points awarded to Finland (Final)
Score	Televote	Jury
12 points		Austria
10 points	Australia; Estonia; Sweden	Armenia; Estonia; Latvia
8 points		Norway
7 points	Croatia; Malta	
6 points	Netherlands; Norway; Serbia; Spain	Denmark; Malta; Sweden
5 points	Azerbaijan; Denmark; Iceland; Ireland; Rest of the World	United Kingdom
4 points	United Kingdom	Belgium; Ireland
3 points	Czechia; Latvia	Switzerland
2 points	Austria	Australia
1 point	Armenia; Israel; Poland	Iceland; Italy

==== Points awarded by Finland ====
Points awarded by Finland (Semi-final 2)
Score	Televote
12 points	Israel
10 points	Latvia
8 points	Denmark
7 points	Austria
6 points	Lithuania
5 points	Australia
4 points	Luxembourg
3 points	Malta
2 points	Ireland
1 point	Greece

Points awarded by Finland (Final)
Score	Televote	Jury
12 points	Sweden	Austria
10 points	Israel	Sweden
8 points	Estonia	France
7 points	Austria	Malta
6 points	Iceland	Switzerland
5 points	Germany	United Kingdom
4 points	Albania	Estonia
3 points	Latvia	Greece
2 points	Ukraine	Israel
1 point	Lithuania	Germany

==== Detailed voting results ====
Each participating broadcaster assembles a five-member jury panel consisting of music industry professionals who are citizens of the country they represent. Each jury, and individual jury member, is required to meet a strict set of criteria regarding professional background, as well as diversity in gender and age. No member of a national jury was permitted to be related in any way to any of the competing acts in such a way that they cannot vote impartially and independently. The individual rankings of each jury member as well as the nation's televoting results were released shortly after the grand final.

The following members comprised the Finnish jury:

- Miikka Maunula
- Panu Hattunen
- Arja Koriseva
- Haza von Hertzen
- Neea Jokinen

Detailed voting results from Finland (Semi-final 2)
R/O	Country	Televote	
R/O	Country	Rank	Points
01	Australia	6	5
02	Montenegro	15	
03	Ireland	9	2
04	Latvia	2	10
05	Armenia	12	
06	Austria	4	7
07	Greece	10	1
08	Lithuania	5	6
09	Malta	8	3
10	Georgia	13	
11	Denmark	3	8
12	Czechia	11	
13	Luxembourg	7	4
14	Israel	1	12
15	Serbia	14	
16	Finland		

Detailed voting results from Finland (Final)
R/O	Country	Jury							Televote	
R/O	Country	Juror A	Juror B	Juror C	Juror D	Juror E	Rank	Points	Rank	Points
01	Norway	15	16	14	9	13	19		15	
02	Luxembourg	20	12	17	17	20	20		13	
03	Estonia	8	6	5	14	14	7	4	3	8
04	Israel	5	18	6	20	12	9	2	2	10
05	Lithuania	16	15	25	4	21	14		10	1
06	Spain	10	13	11	13	11	16		19	
07	Ukraine	19	21	24	18	25	24		9	2
08	United Kingdom	9	20	8	2	15	6	5	25	
09	Austria	1	2	2	1	1	1	12	4	7
10	Iceland	6	23	12	11	16	13		5	6
11	Latvia	11	14	21	6	10	11		8	3
12	Netherlands	24	5	15	22	22	18		12	
13	Finland									
14	Italy	17	25	13	25	17	22		11	
15	Poland	22	24	23	16	18	23		22	
16	Germany	13	17	20	5	8	10	1	6	5
17	Greece	12	7	7	24	5	8	3	18	
18	Armenia	21	10	10	19	6	12		20	
19	Switzerland	3	4	16	15	7	5	6	21	
20	Malta	7	9	4	7	4	4	7	17	
21	Portugal	23	22	19	21	24	25		24	
22	Denmark	18	19	9	10	9	15		16	
23	Sweden	2	1	1	3	3	2	10	1	12
24	France	4	3	3	12	2	3	8	14	
25	San Marino	25	11	18	23	19	21		23	
26	Albania	14	8	22	8	23	17		7	4
