= Luxembourg in the Eurovision Song Contest 2025 =

- Eurovision Song Contest 2025
- Participating broadcaster: RTL Lëtzebuerg (RTL)
- Country: Luxembourg
- Selection process: Luxembourg Song Contest 2025
- Selection date: 25 January 2025

Competing entry
- Song: "La poupée monte le son"
- Artist: Laura Thorn
- Songwriters: Christophe Houssin; Julien Salvia; Ludovic-Alexandre Vidal

Placement
- Semi-final result: Qualified (7th, 62 points)
- Final result: 22nd, 47 points

Participation chronology

Luxembourg was represented at the Eurovision Song Contest 2025 with the song "La poupée monte le son", written by Christophe Houssin, Julien Salvia, and Ludovic-Alexandre Vidal, and performed by Laura Thorn. The Luxembourgish participating broadcaster, RTL Lëtzebuerg (RTL), organised the Luxembourg Song Contest 2025 in order to select its entry for the contest.

Luxembourg was drawn to compete in the second semi-final of the Eurovision Song Contest which took place on 15 May 2025 and was later selected to perform in position 13. At the end of the show, "La poupée monte le son" was announced among the top 10 entries of the second semi-final and hence qualified to compete in the final, marking a second consecutive qualification for the country. It was later revealed that Luxembourg placed seventh out of the sixteen participating countries in the semi-final with 62 points. In the final, Luxembourg performed in position 2 and placed twenty-second out of the 26 participating countries, scoring a total of 47 points.

== Background ==
Prior to the 2025 contest, RTL Lëtzebuerg (RTL), formerly as Compagnie Luxembourgeoise de Télédiffusion (CLT), had participated in the Eurovision Song Contest representing Luxembourg 38 times since debuting in its first edition of 1956. It had won the contest on five occasions: in 1961 with "Nous les amoureux" performed by Jean-Claude Pascal, in 1965 with "Poupée de cire, poupée de son" performed by France Gall, in 1972 with "Après toi" performed by Vicky Leandros, in 1973 with "Tu te reconnaîtras" performed by Anne-Marie David, and in 1983 with "Si la vie est cadeau" performed by Corinne Hermès. Following a 31-year absence, Luxembourg under RTL returned to the contest in 2024 where it qualified to the final and placed 13th with the song "Fighter" performed by Tali.

As part of its duties as participating broadcaster, RTL organises the selection of its entry in the Eurovision Song Contest and broadcasts the event in the country. The broadcaster confirmed its intentions to participate at the 2025 contest on 1 July 2024. CLT had selected its entries by using both national finals and internal selections in the past, with RTL organising the Luxembourg Song Contest national final to select its 2024 entry. Along with its 2025 participation confirmation, the broadcaster announced that it would again select its entry through the Luxembourg Song Contest.

== Before Eurovision ==
=== Luxembourg Song Contest 2025 ===
Luxembourg Song Contest 2025 was the competition organised by RTL to select its entry for the Eurovision Song Contest 2025. The competition featured seven acts and took place on 25 January 2025 at the Rockhal in Esch-sur-Alzette. The show was hosted by Loïc Juchem, Raoul Roos and Conchita Wurst, the latter of whom won Eurovision for Austria in 2014. The show was broadcast on RTL Télé Lëtzebuerg, RTL Radio Lëtzebuerg and Today Radio with Luxembourgish-language commentary, as well as streamed online on RTL Infos with French-language commentary, on RTL Play and RTL Today Radio with English-language commentary by Meredith Moss and Melissa Dalton, and on the broadcaster's website rtl.lu (with the original audio).

==== Competing entries ====
On 11 July 2024, RTL opened a submission period for interested artists and songwriters to submit their entries until 6 October 2024. Artists (at least one of the members for bands and groups) were required to have Luxembourg nationality, have lived in Luxembourg for three consecutive years, or have a strong link with the Luxembourg cultural scene, and were able to submit up to five entries each. A songwriting camp organised by Rocklab took place at the Rockhal in Esch-sur-Alzette between 27 and 30 September 2024 where artists were able to collaborate with local and international songwriters and producers to create their songs for the competition. 79 entries were received by the end of the deadline.

Auditions were held on 8 and 9 November 2024 at the RTL City in Luxembourg City where an international jury panel evaluated the songs and shortlisted 12 entries for a final audition round on 10 November 2024, where the seven finalists were selected. The international jury panel consisted of Diogo Fernandes (Portuguese producer and artist manager), Poli Genova (who represented Bulgaria at Eurovision in 2011 and in 2016), Niamh Kavanagh (who won Eurovision for Ireland in 1993), Marie Myriam (who won Eurovision for France in 1977) and Eldar Gasimov (who won Eurovision for Azerbaijan in 2011). The seven participating acts were announced on 18 November 2024, including One Last Time and Rafa Ela who both competed in the 2024 edition of Luxembourg Song Contest, while their songs were presented on 19 December 2024 on RTL Radio Lëtzebuerg, Today Radio as well as online on RTL Infos and the broadcaster's website rtl.lu.

Artist	Song	Songwriter(s)
Laura Thorn	"La poupée monte le son"	Julien Salvia; Ludovic-Alexandre Vidal
Luzac	"Je danse"	Linda Dale; Alireza Baghdadchi; Edson Pires Domingos; Lucas Zagdoudi
Mäna	"Human Eyes"	Mattias Skantze; Robin Larsson
One Last Time	"Gambler's Song"	Andrea Galleti; Jonathan Fersino; Sam Ray; Albin Håkan Fredy Ljungqvist
Rafa Ela	"No Thank You"	Christoffer Jonsson; Johan Jämtberg; Rafaela Teixeira Fernandes
Rhythmic Soulwave	"Stronger"	Carmen Carbonell Suarez; Naomi Ayé Vajdovics Suarez
Zero Point Five	"Ride"	Federico Menichetti; Gilles Saracini; Chris Reitz; Nathalie Haas; Sander Janssen; Dan Thiltges; Jonas Holteberg Jensen

==== Final ====
The televised final took place on 25 January 2025. The winner, "La poupée monte le son" performed by Laura Thorn, was selected through the 50/50 combination of votes from eight international jury groups and public online voting on the RTL website, which also accepted votes worldwide. The viewers and the juries each awarded a total of 336 points, with each jury group distributing their points as follows: 2, 4, 6, 8, 10 and 12 points. The viewer vote was awarded proportionally, based on the percentage of votes each song achieved. For example, if a song gained 30% of the viewer vote in the first round, then that entry would be awarded 30% of 336 points rounded to the nearest integer: 101 points.

In addition to the performances of the competing entries, interval acts included DJ Nosi, former Eurovision winners Marie Myriam (who won Eurovision for France in 1977) and co-host Conchita Wurst, and Tali, who represented Luxembourg in 2024, performing her latest single "Dear Parents".

Final – 25 January 2025
R/O	Artist	Song	Jury	Televote	Total	Place
1	Rafa Ela	"No Thank You"	36	17	53	7
2	Rhythmic Soulwave	"Stronger"	52	29	81	4
3	Luzac	"Je danse"	62	31	93	3
4	One Last Time	"Gambler's Song"	40	39	79	5
5	Mäna	"Human Eyes"	36	20	56	6
6	Laura Thorn	"La poupée monte le son"	94	90	184	1
7	Zero Point Five	"Ride"	16	110	126	2

Detailed international jury votes
R/O	Song	Netherlands	Poland	Ireland	Malta	Finland	Spain	Estonia	Switzerland	Total
R/O	Song	Netherlands	Poland	Ireland	Malta	Finland	Spain	Estonia	Switzerland	Total
1	"No Thank You"	6	6	6	2	2	4	8	2	36
2	"Stronger"	2	4	8	8	10	6	4	10	52
3	"Je danse"		8	10	10	6	10	12	6	62
4	"Gambler's Song"	8	2	2	6	4	8	6	4	40
5	"Human Eyes"	4	10	4		8	2		8	36
6	"La poupée monte le son"	12	12	12	12	12	12	10	12	94
7	"Ride"	10			4			2		16
International jury spokespersons
Netherlands – Sietse Bakker; Poland – Blanka; Ireland – Michael Kealy; Malta – Ira Losco; Finland – Matti Myllyaho; Spain – Soraya; Estonia – Stefan; Switzerland – Gjon's Tears

== At Eurovision ==
The Eurovision Song Contest 2025 took place at St. Jakobshalle in Basel, Switzerland, and will consisted of two semi-finals held on the respective dates of 13 and 15 May and the final on 17 May 2025. All nations with the exceptions of the host country and the "Big Five" (France, Germany, Italy, Spain and the United Kingdom) were required to qualify from one of two semi-finals in order to compete in the final; the top ten countries from each semi-final progressed to the final. During the allocation draw held on 28 January 2025, Luxembourg was drawn to compete in the second semi-final, performing in the second half of the show. Thorn was later drawn to perform 13th, after Czechia's Adonxs and before Israel's Yuval Raphael. Luxembourg qualified for the final.

=== Voting ===
==== Points awarded to Luxembourg ====
Points awarded to Luxembourg (Semi-final 2)
Score	Televote
12 points	
10 points	France; Israel
8 points	
7 points	Greece
6 points	Austria
5 points	Denmark; Latvia
4 points	Australia; Finland
3 points	Germany; Serbia
2 points	Ireland
1 point	Lithuania; Montenegro; United Kingdom

Points awarded to Luxembourg (Final)
Score	Televote	Jury
12 points		
10 points		
8 points	Albania; Montenegro	
7 points		
6 points		Netherlands
5 points		
4 points	Slovenia	Montenegro; United Kingdom
3 points	Israel	Latvia; Ukraine
2 points		Israel
1 point	France	Austria

==== Points awarded by Luxembourg ====
Points awarded by Luxembourg (Semi-final 2)
Score	Televote
12 points	Israel
10 points	Greece
8 points	Lithuania
7 points	Latvia
6 points	Finland
5 points	Czechia
4 points	Austria
3 points	Malta
2 points	Ireland
1 point	Denmark

Points awarded by Luxembourg (Final)
Score	Televote	Jury
12 points	Israel	France
10 points	Greece	Austria
8 points	Portugal	Switzerland
7 points	Albania	Netherlands
6 points	France	United Kingdom
5 points	Estonia	Sweden
4 points	Lithuania	Germany
3 points	Poland	Estonia
2 points	Sweden	Latvia
1 point	Latvia	Israel

==== Detailed voting results ====
Each participating broadcaster assembles a five-member jury panel consisting of music industry professionals who are citizens of the country they represent. Each jury, and individual jury member, is required to meet a strict set of criteria regarding professional background, as well as diversity in gender and age. No member of a national jury was permitted to be related in any way to any of the competing acts in such a way that they cannot vote impartially and independently. The individual rankings of each jury member as well as the nation's televoting results were released shortly after the grand final.

The following members comprised the Luxembourgish jury:

- Jules Serrig
- Tom Gatti
- Tom Leick-Burns
- Catherine Nothum
- Monique Melsen (represented Luxembourg in the Eurovision Song Contest 1971)

Detailed voting results from Luxembourg (Semi-final 2)
R/O	Country	Televote	
R/O	Country	Rank	Points
01	Australia	11	
02	Montenegro	12	
03	Ireland	9	2
04	Latvia	4	7
05	Armenia	14	
06	Austria	7	4
07	Greece	2	10
08	Lithuania	3	8
09	Malta	8	3
10	Georgia	15	
11	Denmark	10	1
12	Czechia	6	5
13	Luxembourg		
14	Israel	1	12
15	Serbia	13	
16	Finland	5	6

Detailed voting results from Luxembourg (Final)
R/O	Country	Jury							Televote	
R/O	Country	Juror A	Juror B	Juror C	Juror D	Juror E	Rank	Points	Rank	Points
01	Norway	24	21	15	20	23	24		25	
02	Luxembourg									
03	Estonia	4	20	10	4	25	8	3	6	5
04	Israel	9	9	7	7	12	10	1	1	12
05	Lithuania	23	12	23	9	16	15		7	4
06	Spain	15	8	9	15	7	11		17	
07	Ukraine	8	25	20	13	24	16		14	
08	United Kingdom	1	13	8	3	8	5	6	22	
09	Austria	10	1	2	2	2	2	10	12	
10	Iceland	18	10	19	12	21	17		18	
11	Latvia	3	14	21	8	10	9	2	10	1
12	Netherlands	6	5	1	23	4	4	7	16	
13	Finland	25	24	25	25	22	25		15	
14	Italy	14	7	13	10	11	13		13	
15	Poland	22	23	11	21	14	19		8	3
16	Germany	7	4	6	6	15	7	4	11	
17	Greece	21	16	18	19	13	22		2	10
18	Armenia	13	22	17	16	18	21		21	
19	Switzerland	11	2	5	1	9	3	8	23	
20	Malta	19	17	12	24	3	12		19	
21	Portugal	17	19	24	11	20	20		3	8
22	Denmark	20	11	14	22	5	14		20	
23	Sweden	5	6	4	14	6	6	5	9	2
24	France	2	3	3	5	1	1	12	5	6
25	San Marino	12	18	16	17	19	18		24	
26	Albania	16	15	22	18	17	23		4	7
