= Austria in the Eurovision Song Contest 2025 =

- Eurovision Song Contest 2025
- Participating broadcaster: Österreichischer Rundfunk (ORF)
- Country: Austria
- Selection process: Internal selection
- Announcement date: Artist: 30 January 2025; Song: 6 March 2025

Competing entry
- Song: "Wasted Love"
- Artist: JJ
- Songwriters: Johannes Pietsch; Teodora Špirić; Thomas Thurner

Placement
- Semi-final result: Qualified (5th, 104 points)
- Final result: 1st, 436 points

Participation chronology

Austria was represented at the Eurovision Song Contest 2025 with the song "Wasted Love", written by Johannes Pietsch, Teodora Špirić, and Thomas Thurner, and performed by Pietsch himself under his stage name JJ. The Austrian participating broadcaster, Österreichischer Rundfunk (ORF), internally selected its entry for the contest, which it ultimately won.

== Background ==
Prior to the 2025 contest, Österreichischer Rundfunk (ORF) had participated in the Eurovision Song Contest representing Austria fifty-six times since its first entry in 1957. It had won the contest on two occasions: in 1966 with the song "Merci, Chérie" performed by Udo Jürgens and in 2014 with the song "Rise Like a Phoenix" performed by Conchita Wurst. Following the introduction of semi-finals for the 2004 contest, Austria had featured in only nine finals. Its least successful result had been last place, which it had achieved on eight occasions, most recently in 2012. It had also received nul points on four occasions; in 1962, 1988, 1991, and 2015.

As part of its duties as participating broadcaster, ORF organises the selection of its entry in the Eurovision Song Contest and broadcasts the event in the country. ORF confirmed its intentions to participate at the 2025 contest on 7 September 2024. From 2011 to 2013 as well as in 2015 and 2016, ORF set up national finals with several artists to choose both the song and performer to compete at Eurovision for Austria, with both the public and a panel of jury members involved in the selection. In 2014 and since 2017, ORF has held an internal selection to choose the artist and song, a method which was continued to select its entry for the 2025 contest.

== Before Eurovision ==
=== Internal selection ===
ORF collaborated with music experts Eberhard Forcher (who had worked on the selection of the Austrian entries since 2016) and Peter Schreiber on its entry for the Eurovision Song Contest 2025, with all interested artists being invited to submit their songs between 3 July 2024 and 15 September 2024. Applicants were required to be professional artists, and those without a song were also able to apply but were required to submit audio samples or reference songs from them. A songwriting camp was also held in Vienna in August 2024 to create songs for the selection. In October 2024, it was reported by Austrian media that eight entries from seven artists, including Dodo Muhrer (who represented Austria in 2015 as part of The Makemakes), Johannes Pietsch, Kayla Krystin, Nnoa and Philip Piller, had been shortlisted following a live casting round at the ORF studios.

On 30 January 2025, "Wasted Love" performed by Pietsch, under the stage name JJ, was announced by ORF as the Austrian entry for the Eurovision Song Contest 2025 during the radio show Ö3-Wecker, aired on Ö3. The song was selected from the eight shortlisted entries by a panel of 30 local and international music industry and Eurovision experts as well as 30 international OGAE fan club representatives from five countries and the ORF Eurovision Song Contest Team. The presentation of the song took place on 6 March 2025 during Ö3-Wecker.

== At Eurovision ==
During the Eurovision Song Contest, Austria participated in the second semifinal and managed to qualify for the Grand Final finishing in 5th place with 104 points. During the final, They won with 436 points, winning the jury voting with 258 points and finishing 4th in the televoting with 178 points, making it their third Eurovision win after 1966 & 2014.

=== Voting ===
==== Points awarded to Austria ====
Points awarded to Austria (Semi-final 2)
Score	Televote
12 points	
10 points	Greece
8 points	Armenia; Lithuania
7 points	Denmark; Finland; Latvia; Malta; Montenegro
6 points	Czechia; Georgia; Ireland; Israel; Serbia
5 points	Germany
4 points	Luxembourg
3 points	Australia
2 points	
1 point	France

Points awarded to Austria (Final)
Score	Televote	Jury
12 points		Belgium; Finland; Germany; Ireland; Latvia; Netherlands; Norway; Sweden
10 points	Azerbaijan; Greece; Malta; Serbia; Slovenia	Croatia; Greece; Luxembourg; Slovenia
8 points	Israel	Armenia; Iceland; Montenegro; Serbia; United Kingdom
7 points	Armenia; Finland; Poland; Portugal	Albania; Australia; Cyprus; Estonia; Malta; Poland; Spain; Switzerland
6 points	Albania; Cyprus; Germany; Switzerland; Ukraine	Israel; Portugal
5 points	Croatia; Georgia; Lithuania; San Marino	Denmark
4 points	Czechia; Ireland; Italy; Latvia; Spain	France; Lithuania
3 points	Australia; Belgium; Denmark; Iceland; Montenegro; Netherlands	
2 points	France	
1 point	Norway; Rest of the World	Ukraine

==== Points awarded by Austria ====
Points awarded by Austria (Semi-final 2)
Score	Televote
12 points	Israel
10 points	Serbia
8 points	Latvia
7 points	Greece
6 points	Luxembourg
5 points	Czechia
4 points	Finland
3 points	Denmark
2 points	Australia
1 point	Malta

Points awarded by Austria (Final)
Score	Televote	Jury
12 points	Germany	Finland
10 points	Italy	Malta
8 points	Estonia	Denmark
7 points	Israel	United Kingdom
6 points	Albania	France
5 points	Poland	Sweden
4 points	Sweden	Latvia
3 points	Netherlands	Estonia
2 points	Finland	Netherlands
1 point	Iceland	Luxembourg

==== Detailed voting results ====
Each participating broadcaster assembles a five-member jury panel consisting of music industry professionals who are citizens of the country they represent. Each jury, and individual jury member, is required to meet a strict set of criteria regarding professional background, as well as diversity in gender and age. No member of a national jury was permitted to be related in any way to any of the competing acts in such a way that they cannot vote impartially and independently. The individual rankings of each jury member as well as the nation's televoting results were released shortly after the grand final.

The following members comprised the Austrian jury:

- Julian Guba
- Mark Duran
- Katharina Aigner
- Marlene Scharf
- Nina Hochrainer

Detailed voting results from Austria (Semi-final 2)
R/O	Country	Televote	
R/O	Country	Rank	Points
01	Australia	9	2
02	Montenegro	15	
03	Ireland	13	
04	Latvia	3	8
05	Armenia	12	
06	Austria		
07	Greece	4	7
08	Lithuania	11	
09	Malta	10	1
10	Georgia	14	
11	Denmark	8	3
12	Czechia	6	5
13	Luxembourg	5	6
14	Israel	1	12
15	Serbia	2	10
16	Finland	7	4

Detailed voting results from Austria (Final)
R/O	Country	Jury							Televote	
R/O	Country	Juror A	Juror B	Juror C	Juror D	Juror E	Rank	Points	Rank	Points
01	Norway	19	17	11	12	25	21		16	
02	Luxembourg	20	5	12	7	19	10	1	17	
03	Estonia	14	4	9	10	14	8	3	3	8
04	Israel	16	15	15	11	4	12		4	7
05	Lithuania	15	16	21	25	18	23		19	
06	Spain	17	9	17	17	22	20		23	
07	Ukraine	24	14	16	23	24	24		13	
08	United Kingdom	10	1	3	2	13	4	7	24	
09	Austria									
10	Iceland	12	6	22	24	8	16		10	1
11	Latvia	23	13	4	8	7	7	4	12	
12	Netherlands	6	12	18	6	15	9	2	8	3
13	Finland	1	3	5	5	2	1	12	9	2
14	Italy	11	11	6	14	16	15		2	10
15	Poland	22	10	20	19	23	22		6	5
16	Germany	13	18	8	9	9	14		1	12
17	Greece	21	22	19	18	17	25		11	
18	Armenia	7	8	14	15	12	13		18	
19	Switzerland	3	19	13	13	20	11		15	
20	Malta	4	2	1	3	11	2	10	21	
21	Portugal	25	7	23	21	21	19		25	
22	Denmark	2	21	2	1	6	3	8	20	
23	Sweden	8	25	10	16	1	6	5	7	4
24	France	18	20	7	4	3	5	6	14	
25	San Marino	9	23	24	22	5	17		22	
26	Albania	5	24	25	20	10	18		5	6
