= Latvia in the Eurovision Song Contest 2025 =

- Eurovision Song Contest 2025
- Participating broadcaster: Latvian Public Service Media (LSM)
- Country: Latvia
- Selection process: Supernova 2025
- Selection date: 8 February 2025

Competing entry
- Song: "Bur man laimi"
- Artist: Tautumeitas
- Songwriters: Asnate Rancāne; Aurēlija Rancāne; Elvis Lintiņš; Gabriēla Zvaigznīte; Laura Līcīte

Placement
- Semi-final result: Qualified (2nd, 130 points)
- Final result: 13th, 158 points

Participation chronology

Latvia was represented at the Eurovision Song Contest 2025 with the song "Bur man laimi", written by Asnate Rancāne, Aurēlija Rancāne, Elvis Lintiņš, Gabriēla Zvaigznīte, and Laura Līcīte, and performed by themselves as Tautumeitas. The Latvian participating broadcaster, Latvian Public Service Media (LSM), organised the national final Supernova 2025 in order to select its entry for the contest.

Latvia was drawn to compete in the second semi-final of the Eurovision Song Contest which took place on 15 May 2025 and was later selected to perform in position 4. At the end of the show, "Bur man laimi" was announced among the top 10 entries of the second semi-final and hence qualified to compete in the final, marking a second consecutive qualification for the country. It was later revealed that Latvia placed second out of the sixteen participating countries in the semi-final with 130 points, which matched the country's highest semi-final placing previously achieved in 2015. In the final, Latvia performed in position 11 and placed thirteenth out of the 26 participating countries, scoring a total of 158 points, including a seventh place finish with the juries. This marked Latvia's highest placing since 2015.

== Background ==
Prior to the 2025 contest, Latvian Television (LTV) had participated in the Eurovision Song Contest representing Latvia 24 times since its first entry in 2000. It won the contest once in 2002 with the song "I Wanna" performed by Marie N. Following the introduction of semi-finals in 2004, it was able to qualify for the final between 2005 and 2008. Between 2009 and 2014, it failed to qualify to the final for six consecutive years before managing to qualify to the final in 2015 and 2016. Having once again failed to qualify to the final for six consecutive contests between 2017 and 2023, it managed to qualify to the final in 2024 with the song "Hollow" performed by Dons, placing 16th with a score of 64 points.

After a restructuring that led to the incorporation of LTV into the current Latvian Public Service Media (LSM) on 2 January 2025, it was the latter who participated in the 2025 contest. As part of its duties as participating broadcaster, LSM organises the selection of its entry in the Eurovision Song Contest and broadcasts the event in the country. The broadcaster confirmed their intentions to participate at the 2025 contest on 16 July 2024. LTV selected their entries for Eurovision through a national final. Since their debut in 2000 until 2012, LTV had organised the selection show Eirodziesma, which was rebranded and retooled as Dziesma in 2013 and 2014. Since 2015, LTV organised the Supernova national final in order to select its entry, and on 24 July 2024, the broadcaster announced that it would return with organising Supernova 2025 in order to select its entry for the 2025 contest.

== Before Eurovision ==
=== Supernova 2025 ===
Supernova 2025 was the tenth edition of the national final format used to select Latvia's entry for the Eurovision Song Contest. The competition commenced on 1 February 2025 with a semi-final and concluded with a final on 8 February 2025. The two shows in the competition took place at the Riga Film Studio in Riga, hosted by Ketija Šēnberga and Lauris Reiniks and broadcast on LTV1 as well as online via the streaming platform Replay.lv and the official Supernova website supernova.lsm.lv. Alternative broadcasts of the final also occurred on LTV7 with a sign language translation as well as online at lsm.lv.

==== Format ====
The format of the competition consisted of two shows: a semi-final and a final. The semi-final, held on 1 February 2025, featured nineteen competing entries from which the top ten advanced to the final from each show. LTV also had the right to advance a wildcard act to the final from the remaining non-qualifying entries in the semi-final, but ultimately opted against doing so. The final, held on 8 February 2025, selected the Latvian entry for Basel from the remaining ten entries. Results during the semi-final and final shows were determined by the 50/50 combination of votes from a jury panel and a public televote, with both the jury and public vote assigning points from 1-8, 10 and 12 to the competing songs. Ties were decided in favour of the entries that received higher points from the public. Viewers were able to vote via telephone or SMS, with a single SMS counting as ten individual votes.

The jury voted in each show and selected entries to advance in the competition. The panel consisted of:

- Anna Platpīre – content editor for LTV
- Grettel Killing – Estonian artist manager
- Mārtiņš Pabērzis – presenter of Latvijas Radio 5
- Reinis Sējāns – musician, composer and producer, represented Latvia in 2006 as part of Cosmos
- Rob Gruschke – Dutch music industry collective rights manager
- Saulius Urbonavičius – television producer, represented Lithuania in 2006 as part of LT United
- Tommi Kyyrä – deputy director of IFPI Finland
- Una Stade – singer, composer, vocal coach and conductor

==== Competing entries ====
On 20 August 2024, LTV opened a song submission window for artists to apply, with the deadline set for 21 October 2024. Performers were required to be Latvian nationals or permanent residents of Latvia, while songwriters and producers could be from any country. Additionally, a songwriting camp was held in Riga in late August 2024 in order to create songs to be submitted for the competition. At the end of the submission period, 96 entries had been received. The participants were selected by a jury composed of representatives of the Latvian music and television industry, as well as foreign professionals, and were announced on 20 November 2024 on the programme Rīta Panorāma, broadcast on LTV1.

Among the selected competing artists were Justs and Citi Zēni, who represented Latvia in 2016 and 2022, respectively. On 28 January 2025, it was announced that Grēta had withdrawn her participation due to health problems.

Key: Entry withdrawn

Artist	Song	Songwriter(s)
Adelina	"Electric Love"	Adelina Jurevica; Nicolas Jirahos
Bel Tempo and Legzdina	"The Water"	Andis Ansons; Elīza Legzdiņa; Jūlijs Melngailis
Chris Noah	"Romance Isn't Dead"	Kristofer Harris; Krists Indrišonoks
Citi Zēni	"Ramtai"	Dagnis Roziņš; Emmy Kristine Guttulsrud Kristiansen; Jānis Pētersons; Mikus Frišfelds; Oscar Immanuel Mathisen; Toms Jēkabs Kagainis
Emilija	"Heartbeat"	Emilija Bērziņa; Kaiya Campbell; Niels Sakko
~~Grēta~~	~~"Monster"~~	Emma Gale; Grēta Grantiņa; Jēkabs Ludvigs Kalmanis; Kristaps Ērglis; Simon Davis
Julianna	"Something in the Water"	Julianna Tīruma
Justs	"Fit Right"	Aluel Ayok-Loewenberg; Justs Sirmais; Oskars Uhans; Rūdolfs Budze
Katrīna Gupalo	"Scarlett Challenger"	Edgars Vilcāns; Katrīna Gupalo
KoBra	"Zelts"	Katrīna Kovaļuka; Krišjānis Brasliņš
Luka	"Stronger"	Elizabete Lukaševiča; Kaspars Ansons; Koos Kamerling
Markus Riva	"Bigger than This"	Markus Riva; Roman Nepomiashchyi
Marta	"Lovable"	Jānis Jačmenkins; Joel Werner; Marta Grigale; Michaela Stridbeck; Reinis Straume
Palú	"Delusional"	Jorens Daugulis; Olga Palušina; Roberts Memmēns
Rūta Dūduma	"Chemical"	Jēkabs Ludvigs Kalmanis; Rūta Dūduma-Ķirse; Tilde Wall
Sinerģija	"Bound by the Light"	Madara Fogelmane
Tautumeitas	"Bur man laimi"	Asnate Rancāne; Aurēlija Rancāne; Elvis Lintiņš; Gabriēla Zvaigznīte; Laura Līcīte
Tepat	"Sadzejot"	Andris Žabris; Eduards Bariss; Enriko Luiss Korvisons-Rohass; Krišjānis Laizāns; Matīss Barons; Madara Dzene
The Ludvig	"Līgo"	Ārijs Šķepasts; Jānis Ķirsis; Jēkabs Ludvigs Kalmanis
Toms Kalderauskis	"Domāju, tu nāc"	Kate Elpo; Toms Kalderauskis

==== Semi-final ====
The semi-final took place on 1 February 2025 where nineteen acts competed. The top ten entries qualified to the final based on the combination of votes from a jury panel and the Latvian public.

Semi-final – 1 February 2025
R/O	Artist	Song	Result
1	Marta	"Lovable"	Eliminated
2	Tepat	"Sadzejot"	Advanced
3	Justs	"Fit Right"	Eliminated
4	KoBra	"Zelts"	Eliminated
5	Adelina	"Electric Love"	Eliminated
6	Citi Zēni	"Ramtai"	Advanced
7	Emilija	"Heartbeat"	Advanced
8	Bel Tempo and Legzdina	"The Water"	Advanced
9	Palú	"Delusional"	Advanced
10	The Ludvig	"Līgo"	Advanced
11	Luka	"Stronger"	Eliminated
12	Chris Noah	"Romance Isn't Dead"	Advanced
13	Toms Kalderauskis	"Domāju, tu nāc"	Eliminated
14	Julianna	"Something in the Water"	Eliminated
15	Tautumeitas	"Bur man laimi"	Advanced
16	Rūta Dūduma	"Chemical"	Eliminated
17	Katrīna Gupalo	"Scarlett Challenger"	Eliminated
18	Sinerģija	"Bound by the Light"	Advanced
19	Markus Riva	"Bigger than This"	Advanced

==== Final ====
The final took place on 8 February 2025 where the ten entries that qualified from the semi-final competed. The combination of votes from a jury panel and the Latvian public resulted in a tie for first place between "Bur man laimi" and "Heartbeat", but since "Bur man laimi" performed by Tautumeitas received the most votes from the latter, it was declared the winner. In addition to the competing entries, the show featured multiple guest performances by 2015 Latvian entrant Aminata.

Final – 8 February 2025
R/O	Artist	Song	Jury rank	Televote		Place
R/O	Artist	Song	Jury rank	Votes	Rank	Place
1	Chris Noah	"Romance Isn't Dead"	4	27,808	4	5
2	Palú	"Delusional"	7	6,309	8	7
3	Sinerģija	"Bound by the Light"	8	6,184	9	9
4	Citi Zēni	"Ramtai"	1	22,562	5	3
5	Tepat	"Sadzejot"	9	4,848	10	10
6	The Ludvig	"Līgo"	6	69,933	1	4
7	Markus Riva	"Bigger than This"	10	18,927	6	8
8	Tautumeitas	"Bur man laimi"	3	61,028	2	1
9	Bel Tempo and Legzdina	"The Water"	5	15,047	7	6
10	Emilija	"Heartbeat"	2	56,577	3	2

==== Ratings ====
Viewing figures by show
Show	Air date	Viewership	Avg. rating (%)
Semi-final	1 February 2025	158,700	9.2%
Final	8 February 2025	179,100	10.4%

== At Eurovision ==
Latvia performed in the Second Semi-Final of the Eurovision Song Contest 2025 at St. Jakobshalle in Basel on May 15. In January, they were drawn to perform in the first half of the semi-final, and they were later allocated 4th in the running order. Tautumeitas qualified for the final in 2nd place with 130 points.

In the Grand Final, Latvia received 116 points from the juries, which included 12 points from Denmark, Lithuania, and the United Kingdom. They also received 42 points from the televote, with 12 points also from Lithuania. They finished in 13th place with 158 points, Latvia's best result in Eurovision since 2015.

=== Voting ===
==== Points awarded to Latvia ====
Points awarded to Latvia (Semi-final 2)
Score	Televote
12 points	Lithuania
10 points	Czechia; Finland; Rest of the World
8 points	Austria; Denmark; Germany; Ireland; United Kingdom
7 points	Australia; Georgia; Luxembourg
6 points	France
5 points	
4 points	Armenia; Israel; Serbia
3 points	Greece; Malta; Montenegro
2 points	
1 point	

Points awarded to Latvia (Final)
Score	Televote	Jury
12 points	Lithuania	Denmark; Lithuania; United Kingdom
10 points		Australia
8 points	Estonia; Ukraine	Georgia; San Marino
7 points		Belgium; Croatia; Israel; Portugal
6 points		Norway; Ukraine
5 points		
4 points		Austria
3 points	Finland; Ireland; United Kingdom	Estonia; Netherlands
2 points	Australia; Poland	Luxembourg
1 point	Luxembourg	Armenia; Serbia

==== Points awarded by Latvia ====
Points awarded by Latvia (Semi-final 2)
Score	Televote
12 points	Lithuania
10 points	Israel
8 points	Finland
7 points	Austria
6 points	Australia
5 points	Luxembourg
4 points	Ireland
3 points	Georgia
2 points	Denmark
1 point	Armenia

Points awarded by Latvia (Final)
Score	Televote	Jury
12 points	Estonia	Austria
10 points	Lithuania	Finland
8 points	Sweden	Switzerland
7 points	Israel	Lithuania
6 points	Ukraine	France
5 points	Germany	Malta
4 points	Austria	Armenia
3 points	Finland	Luxembourg
2 points	Italy	Germany
1 point	Norway	Estonia

==== Detailed voting results ====
Each participating broadcaster assembles a five-member jury panel consisting of music industry professionals who are citizens of the country they represent. Each jury, and individual jury member, is required to meet a strict set of criteria regarding professional background, as well as diversity in gender and age. No member of a national jury was permitted to be related in any way to any of the competing acts in such a way that they cannot vote impartially and independently. The individual rankings of each jury member as well as the nation's televoting results were released shortly after the grand final.

The following members comprised the Latvian jury:

- Rodrigo Fomins
- Toms Andris Putniņš
- Kristīne Pāže
- Liena Edvardsa
- Una Stade

Detailed voting results from Latvia (Semi-final 2)
R/O	Country	Televote	
R/O	Country	Rank	Points
01	Australia	5	6
02	Montenegro	15	
03	Ireland	7	4
04	Latvia		
05	Armenia	10	1
06	Austria	4	7
07	Greece	13	
08	Lithuania	1	12
09	Malta	12	
10	Georgia	8	3
11	Denmark	9	2
12	Czechia	11	
13	Luxembourg	6	5
14	Israel	2	10
15	Serbia	14	
16	Finland	3	8

Detailed voting results from Latvia (Final)
R/O	Country	Jury							Televote	
R/O	Country	Juror A	Juror B	Juror C	Juror D	Juror E	Rank	Points	Rank	Points
01	Norway	17	10	25	15	13	18		10	1
02	Luxembourg	16	21	5	11	3	8	3	17	
03	Estonia	5	6	18	10	12	10	1	1	12
04	Israel	24	25	13	21	11	23		4	7
05	Lithuania	6	3	10	5	6	4	7	2	10
06	Spain	23	17	21	24	2	13		22	
07	Ukraine	8	4	19	16	20	12		5	6
08	United Kingdom	25	20	24	23	19	25		24	
09	Austria	1	2	4	1	15	1	12	7	4
10	Iceland	15	11	16	17	24	20		13	
11	Latvia									
12	Netherlands	4	9	20	18	21	14		11	
13	Finland	3	1	2	2	17	2	10	8	3
14	Italy	12	15	14	7	4	11		9	2
15	Poland	22	22	8	25	23	21		19	
16	Germany	13	18	7	4	9	9	2	6	5
17	Greece	14	19	17	13	14	19		20	
18	Armenia	18	12	9	9	1	7	4	18	
19	Switzerland	9	8	3	3	7	3	8	14	
20	Malta	10	13	1	6	18	6	5	21	
21	Portugal	21	23	23	12	5	17		16	
22	Denmark	19	14	6	20	10	16		23	
23	Sweden	7	7	12	14	22	15		3	8
24	France	2	5	11	8	8	5	6	15	
25	San Marino	20	24	22	22	16	24		25	
26	Albania	11	16	15	19	25	22		12	
