= Neea River =

Finnish musical artist

- Born: Neea Jokinen
- Origin: 4th October 1996 Nurmijärvi, Finland
- Genres: Pop
- Occupations: Singer, songwriter
- Years active: 2015–present
- Website: neeariver.com

Neea Jokinen, known professionally as Neea River, is a Finnish singer-songwriter. She released her debut single "All The Way" in 2023, and has since released 10 singles. In January 2025, she was announced to compete in Uuden Musiikin Kilpailu with her single "Nightmares".

== Career ==
Originally from Nurmijärvi, River started to compose for artists and started to upload covers on Instagram in 2015. Her career took a turn when a producer saw her covers and she moved to Los Angeles. Her third song she ever wrote for herself, "Crash", was featured in the movie "The Perfect Girlfriend". Upon moving back to Finland, she signed a publishing contract but later became an independent artist.

River released her debut single "All The Way" in 2023 and has since released 10 singles, achieving international attention. She received a Best Pop nomination in the Finnish Indie Awards 2025.

In January 2025, River was announced as one of the 7 Uuden Musiikin Kilpailu contestants with her single "Nightmares". The song has since been playlisted on streaming platforms such as Spotify and has received a top 10 chart placement in Finland. The song finished 5th in the competition (which was won by Erika Vikman) with 84 points. She went on to be a jury member for Finland at the Eurovision Song Contest 2025.
