= Bobbi Arlo =

Irish singer-songwriter

- Born: November 1, 1997 (age 28); Dublin, Ireland
- Origin: Blessington, County Wicklow, Ireland
- Genres: Hyperpop; rhythm and blues
- Occupations: Singer, songwriter
- Years active: 2019–present

Jennifer O'Brien (born 1997/1998), known professionally as Bobbi Arlo, is an Irish singer-songwriter.

== Early life ==
Born in the Coombe Hospital, Arlo is originally from Blessington in County Wicklow and studied at Blessington Community College. She studied musical theatre in college, working in Dunnes Stores while studying.

== Musical career ==
Arlo's stage name derives from her initials and Arlo, a name she liked. She released her debut single, "Berries", in 2019.

Arlo was named as part of RTÉ 2FM's "Rising List" in 2021. Her song "Fever Thoughts" was included as part of the soundtrack of the television series Conversations with Friends in 2022.

In 2022, Arlo's song "Feel It" was nominated for Irish Song of the Year at the Choice Music Prize Awards. In 2024, she was named the Gay Times Artist Of The Year.

In 2023, there had been speculation about Arlo participating in the Eurovision Song Contest for Ireland, which she had described as a "childhood dream". In 2025, it was announced that Arlo would participate in Eurosong 2025, the national selection for Ireland's Eurovision song in 2025, with the song "Powerplay". She finished in 3rd place with 20 points.

=== Musical influences ===
Arlo has described her sound as being influenced by artists such as Kaytranada, Ravyn Lenae, Shygirl and Sega Bodega.

== Personal life ==
Arlo is openly queer. She is type 1 diabetic and has ADHD. She was involved in Hot Press's 2021 #AllAgainstRacism campaign.
