= France in the Eurovision Song Contest 2025 =

- Eurovision Song Contest 2025
- Participating broadcaster: France Télévisions
- Country: France
- Selection process: Internal selection
- Announcement date: Artist: 30 January 2025; Song: 15 March 2025

Competing entry
- Song: "Maman"
- Artist: Louane
- Songwriters: Anne Peichert; Tristan Salvati

Placement
- Final result: 7th, 230 points

Participation chronology

France was represented at the Eurovision Song Contest 2025 with the song "Maman", written by Anne Peichert and Tristan Salvati, and performed by Peichert herself under her stage name Louane. The French participating broadcaster, France Télévisions, internally selected its entry for the contest.

As a member of the "Big Five", France automatically qualified to compete in the final of the Eurovision Song Contest. Performing in position 24, France placed seventh out of the 26 performing countries with 230 points.

== Background ==
Prior to the 2025 contest, France Télévisions and its predecessor national broadcasters have participated in the Eurovision Song Contest representing France sixty-six times since RTF's debut in the inaugural contest. They first won the contest in 1958 with "Dors, mon amour" performed by André Claveau. In the 1960s, they won three times, with "Tom Pillibi" performed by Jacqueline Boyer in 1960, "Un premier amour" performed by Isabelle Aubret in 1962, and "Un jour, un enfant" performed by Frida Boccara, who won in 1969 in a four-way tie with the Netherlands, Spain, and the United Kingdom. Their fifth – and so far latest – victory came in 1977 with "L'oiseau et l'enfant" performed by Marie Myriam. France has also finished second five times, with Paule Desjardins in 1957, Catherine Ferry in 1976, Joëlle Ursull in 1990, Amina in 1991 (who lost out to Sweden's Carola in a tie-break), and Barbara Pravi in 2021. In the 21st century, France has had less success, only making the top ten five times, with Natasha St-Pier finishing fourth in 2001, Sandrine François finishing fifth in 2002, Patricia Kaas finishing eighth in 2009, Amir finishing sixth in 2016, and Pravi finishing second in 2021 with 499 points. In 2024, it finished in fourth place with the song "Mon amour" performed by Slimane.

As part of its duties as participating broadcaster, France Télévisions organises the selection of its entry in the Eurovision Song Contest and broadcasts the event in the country through France 2. The French broadcasters have used both national finals and internal selections to choose their entries in the past. In 2021 and 2022, the broadcaster selected its entries via the national final Eurovision France, c'est vous qui décidez !, a format which was also planned to be held in 2023 but was ultimately cancelled in favour of an internal selection. In August 2024, France Télévisions confirmed its intention to participate in the 2025 contest.

== Before Eurovision ==
=== Internal selection ===
On 30 January 2025, France Télévisions announced that it had internally selected Louane as the French entrant for the 2025 contest; the announcement came shortly after multiple French outlets reported Louane as having been unofficially confirmed to them as the selected entrant. Her entry, "Maman", was presented to the public on 15 March, during half-time of the final match between France and Scotland in the 2025 Six Nations Championship tournament at the Stade de France.

== At Eurovision ==
=== Voting ===
==== Points awarded to France ====
Points awarded to France (Final)
Score	Televote	Jury
12 points		Albania; Armenia; Greece; Luxembourg; Serbia
10 points	Armenia	Cyprus; Germany
8 points	Belgium	Czechia; Finland; Ireland; Malta; Spain; Switzerland
7 points		Sweden
6 points	Luxembourg	Austria; Estonia; Latvia; Montenegro
5 points	Greece; Portugal	San Marino
4 points	Israel; Switzerland	Iceland
3 points	Cyprus	Poland; Slovenia
2 points	Azerbaijan; Montenegro	Netherlands; Norway; United Kingdom
1 point	Spain	

==== Points awarded by France ====
Points awarded by France (Semi-final 2)
Score	Televote
12 points	Israel
10 points	Luxembourg
8 points	Armenia
7 points	Greece
6 points	Latvia
5 points	Lithuania
4 points	Serbia
3 points	Denmark
2 points	Finland
1 point	Austria

Points awarded by France (Final)
Score	Televote	Jury
12 points	Israel	Albania
10 points	Albania	Armenia
8 points	Armenia	Greece
7 points	Poland	Israel
6 points	Ukraine	Italy
5 points	Portugal	Spain
4 points	Greece	Austria
3 points	Italy	Netherlands
2 points	Austria	Switzerland
1 point	Luxembourg	Poland

==== Detailed voting results ====
Each participating broadcaster assembles a five-member jury panel consisting of music industry professionals who are citizens of the country they represent. Each jury, and individual jury member, is required to meet a strict set of criteria regarding professional background, as well as diversity in gender and age. No member of a national jury was permitted to be related in any way to any of the competing acts in such a way that they cannot vote impartially and independently. The individual rankings of each jury member as well as the nation's televoting results were released shortly after the grand final.

The following members comprised the French jury:

- Franck Broqua
- Olivier Weber
- Alexia Guerin
- Nathalie Couzouyan
- Virginie Petit

Detailed voting results from France (Semi-final 2)
R/O	Country	Televote	
R/O	Country	Rank	Points
01	Australia	12	
02	Montenegro	16	
03	Ireland	13	
04	Latvia	5	6
05	Armenia	3	8
06	Austria	10	1
07	Greece	4	7
08	Lithuania	6	5
09	Malta	14	
10	Georgia	15	
11	Denmark	8	3
12	Czechia	11	
13	Luxembourg	2	10
14	Israel	1	12
15	Serbia	7	4
16	Finland	9	2

Detailed voting results from France (Final)
R/O	Country	Jury							Televote	
R/O	Country	Juror A	Juror B	Juror C	Juror D	Juror E	Rank	Points	Rank	Points
01	Norway	20	19	23	17	4	14		23	
02	Luxembourg	15	12	14	12	10	16		10	1
03	Estonia	24	23	16	10	11	21		14	
04	Israel	3	3	11	5	16	4	7	1	12
05	Lithuania	22	25	13	25	20	24		20	
06	Spain	9	6	21	6	3	6	5	11	
07	Ukraine	21	22	17	22	24	25		5	6
08	United Kingdom	4	15	10	15	18	13		22	
09	Austria	18	1	8	13	9	7	4	9	2
10	Iceland	14	16	9	16	21	20		18	
11	Latvia	16	24	6	23	14	17		17	
12	Netherlands	10	20	4	11	5	8	3	12	
13	Finland	23	13	25	2	22	12		19	
14	Italy	6	4	2	24	12	5	6	8	3
15	Poland	5	21	19	3	23	10	1	4	7
16	Germany	8	18	20	20	17	22		15	
17	Greece	13	2	3	4	8	3	8	7	4
18	Armenia	7	7	1	7	1	2	10	3	8
19	Switzerland	11	9	5	9	7	9	2	16	
20	Malta	2	10	24	18	15	11		25	
21	Portugal	25	8	12	21	19	19		6	5
22	Denmark	17	14	18	14	13	23		24	
23	Sweden	12	11	15	8	25	15		13	
24	France									
25	San Marino	19	17	22	19	6	18		21	
26	Albania	1	5	7	1	2	1	12	2	10
