= Armenia in the Eurovision Song Contest 2025 =

- Eurovision Song Contest 2025
- Participating broadcaster: Public Television of Armenia (AMPTV)
- Country: Armenia
- Selection process: Depi Evratesil 2025
- Selection date: 16 February 2025

Competing entry
- Song: "Survivor"
- Artist: Parg
- Songwriters: Alex Wilke; Armen Paul; Benjamin Alasu; Eva Voskanian; Jon Aljidi; Joshua Curran; Martin Mooradian; Pargev Vardanian; Peter Boström; Thomas G:son

Placement
- Semi-final result: Qualified (10th, 51 points)
- Final result: 20th, 72 points

Participation chronology

Armenia was represented at the Eurovision Song Contest 2025 with the song "Survivor", written by Alex Wilke, Armen Paul, Benjamin Alasu, Eva Voskanian, Jon Aljidi, Joshua Curran, Martin Mooradian, Pargev Vardanian, Peter Boström, and Thomas G:son, and performed by Vardanian himself under his stage name Parg. The Armenian participating broadcaster, Public Television of Armenia (AMPTV), organised the national final Depi Evratesil 2025 to select its entry for the contest.

Armenia was drawn to compete in the second semi-final of the Eurovision Song Contest which took place on 15 May 2025 and was later selected to perform in position 5. At the end of the show, "Survivor" was announced among the top 10 entries of the second semi-final and hence qualified to compete in the final, marking a fourth consecutive qualification for the country. It was later revealed that Armenia placed tenth out of the sixteen participating countries in the semi-final with 51 points. In the final, Armenia performed in position 18 and placed twentieth out of the 26 participating countries, scoring a total of 72 points.

== Background ==
Prior to the 2025 contest, Public Television of Armenia (AMPTV) had participated in the Eurovision Song Contest representing Armenia sixteen times since its first entry in 2006. Its highest placing in the contest, to this point, had been fourth place, achieved on two occasions: in 2008 with the song "Qélé, Qélé" performed by Sirusho and in 2014 with the song "Not Alone" performed by Aram Mp3. It had, to this point, failed to qualify to the final on three occasions, namely in 2011, 2018, and 2019. AMPTV briefly withdrew from the contest on two occasions: in 2012 due to long-standing tensions with then-host country Azerbaijan, and in 2021 due to social and political crises in the aftermath of the Second Nagorno-Karabakh War. In 2024, "Jako" performed by Ladaniva qualified to the final and ultimately placed eighth.

As part of its duties as participating broadcaster, AMPTV organises the selection of its entry in the Eurovision Song Contest and broadcasts the event in the country. It had used various methods to select its entry in the past, such as internal selections and a live televised national final to choose the performer, song or both to compete at Eurovision. Between 2014 and 2016, and again between 2022 and 2024, the broadcaster internally selected both the artist and the song, while the national final Depi Evratesil was organised in 2017, 2018 and 2020. AMPTV confirmed its intention to participate in the 2025 contest on 30 November 2024, announcing that its entry would again be selected through Depi Evratesil.

== Before Eurovision ==
=== Depi Evratesil 2025 ===
Depi Evratesil 2025 was the fourth edition of Depi Evratesil, the national final organised by AMPTV in order to select its entry for the Eurovision Song Contest. The competition took place on 16 February 2025 at the Karen Demirchyan Sports and Concerts Complex in Yerevan, hosted by Ani Khachikyan and 2014 Armenian entrant Aram Mp3. The show was broadcast on Armenia 1, as well as online via the broadcaster's website 1tv.am and internationally via the Eurovision Song Contest's official YouTube channel.

==== Competing entries ====
On 6 December 2024, AMPTV opened a submission period where artists and composers were able to submit their entries for the competition until 10 January 2025. All entrants were to be citizens or residents of Armenia or of Armenian descent, while songwriters could be of any nationality. At the closing of the window, over 50 entries had been submitted. Twelve finalists were selected by a jury following an audition round and revealed on 6 February 2025, while their songs, originally set to be unveiled on the day of the final, were released on 9 February 2025. Among the selected competing artists was Athena Manoukian, who had been due to represent Armenia in the Eurovision Song Contest 2020 before its cancellation, as well as Anahit Adamyan, who represented Armenia in the Junior Eurovision Song Contest 2016 alongside Mary Vardanyan.

Artist	Song	Songwriter(s)
Altsight	"Dare to Dream"	Sargis Burnazyan
Anahit Adamyan	"Tiny Little Boo"	Boris Adamyan; Nick Egibyan
Anahit Hakobyan and Gasoiia	"Wild"	David Badalyan; Gor Asoyan; Maya Sinanyan (Note: Arpine Martoyan was also named as a songwriter upon the digital release of "Wild".)
Arsen feat. Kamil	"Will You Marry Me?"	Mariam Shahinyan; Vahram Petrosyan
Athena Manoukian	"Daqueenation"	Athena Manoukian; DJ Paco
Flora Bichakhchyan	"Prayer"	Flora Bichakhchyan
Gevorg Harutyunyan	"Hey Man"	Eva Voskanyan; Gevorg Harutyunyan; Lilit Bleyan; Lilit Navasardyan; Nare Navasardyan
Mels	"Losing"	Arthur Armeni; Robert Koloyan; Tokionine
Milena Mirijanyan	"Romantic Net"	Nick Egibyan
Parg	"Survivor"	Alex Wilke; Armen Paul; Benjamin Alasu; Eva Voskanian; Joshua Curran; Martin Mooradian; Pargev Vardanian; Thomas G:son
Sevagir	"Falling"	Em Kalmukhyan
Simon	"Ay paparey bye" (Այ պապարեյ)	Lilit Navasardyan; Nare Navasardyan

==== Final ====
The final took place on 16 February 2025. The winner, "Survivor" performed by Parg, was selected based on the combination of votes from an international jury (1/3), a national jury (1/3) and a televote (1/3). Both juries consisted of seven members who distributed their points following the same pattern used in the Eurovision Song Contest, i.e. 12, 10 and 8–1 points to their ten favourites; the international jury consisted of Alexandra Redde-Amiel, Felix Bergsson, Julian Gutierrez, Natia Mshvenieradze, Nicoline Refsing, Sergio Jaén and Stefano Karakocci, while the national jury consisted of Anush Ter-Ghukasyan, Aram Sukiasyan, Artur Yezekyan, David Babakhanyan, David Tserunyan, Hovhannes Movsisyan and Tigran Virabyan. In addition to the competing entries, the guest performers included Maléna, who won the Junior Eurovision Song Contest 2021 for Armenia, with "Flashing Lights", host Aram Mp3 with "Not Alone", and Brunette, who represented Armenia in the Eurovision Song Contest 2023, with "Future Lover", "No Energy" and "Superstar Illness".

Final – 16 February 2025
R/O	Artist	Song	Jury		Televote		Total	Place
R/O	Artist	Song	Intl.	National	Votes	Points	Total	Place
1	Parg	"Survivor"	62	68	7,087	84	214	1
2	Sevagir	"Falling"	15	20	553	0	35	12
3	Anahit Adamyan	"Tiny Little Boo"	32	29	2,271	35	96	5
4	Mels	"Losing"	25	38	2,006	28	91	6
5	Simon	"Ay paparey bye"	76	72	4,337	49	197	2
6	Flora Bichakhchyan	"Prayer"	32	22	1,697	21	75	8
7	Gevorg Harutyunyan	"Hey Man"	20	16	2,850	42	78	7
8	Altsight	"Dare to Dream"	29	12	263	0	41	11
9	Anahit Hakobyan and Gasoiia	"Wild"	25	34	4,969	56	115	4
10	Arsen feat. Kamil	"Will You Marry Me?"	11	24	905	7	42	9
11	Milena Mirijanyan	"Romantic Net"	19	9	1,302	14	42	9
12	Athena Manoukian	"Daqueenation"	60	62	5,062	70	192	3

== At Eurovision ==
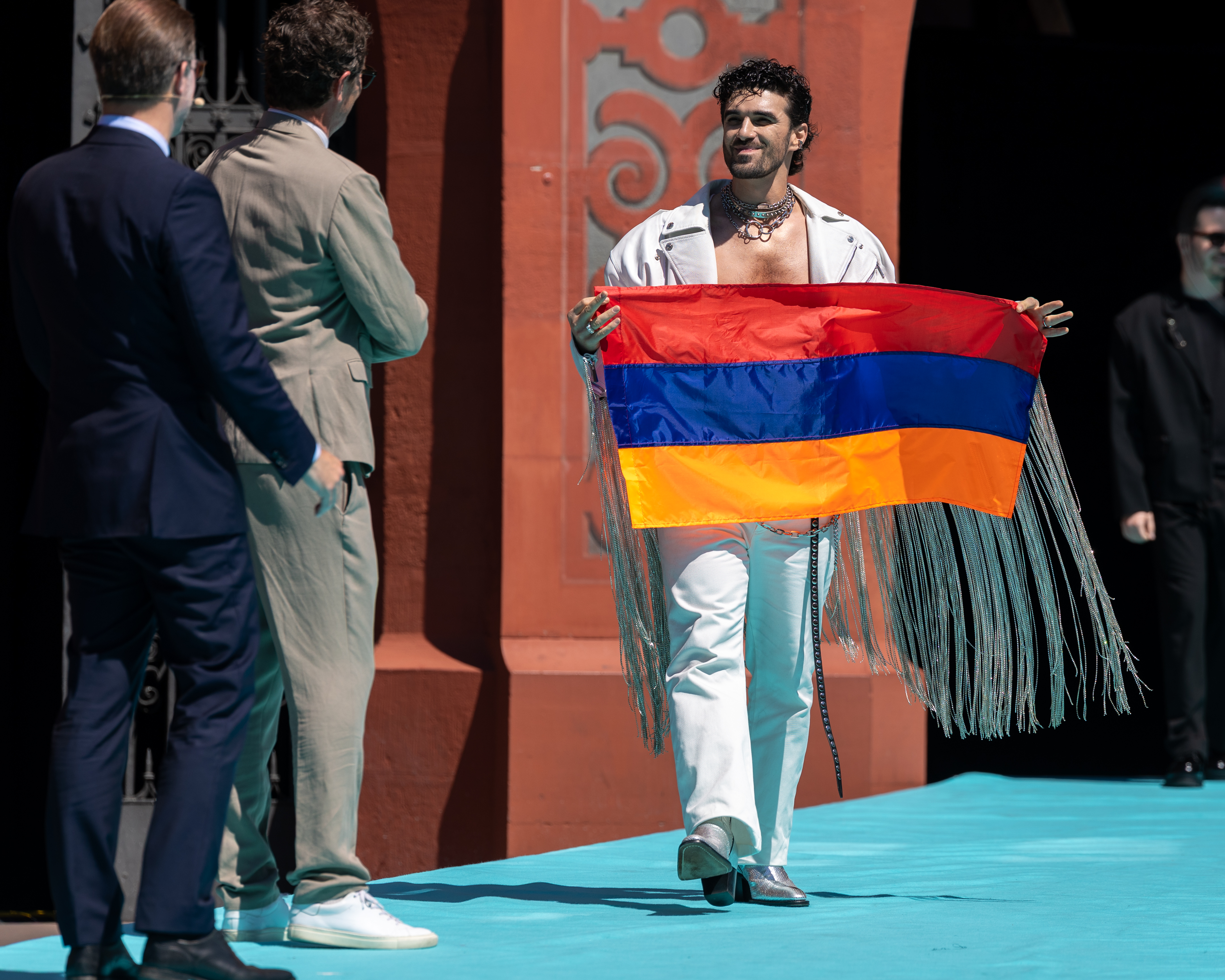
Parg during the opening ceremony.

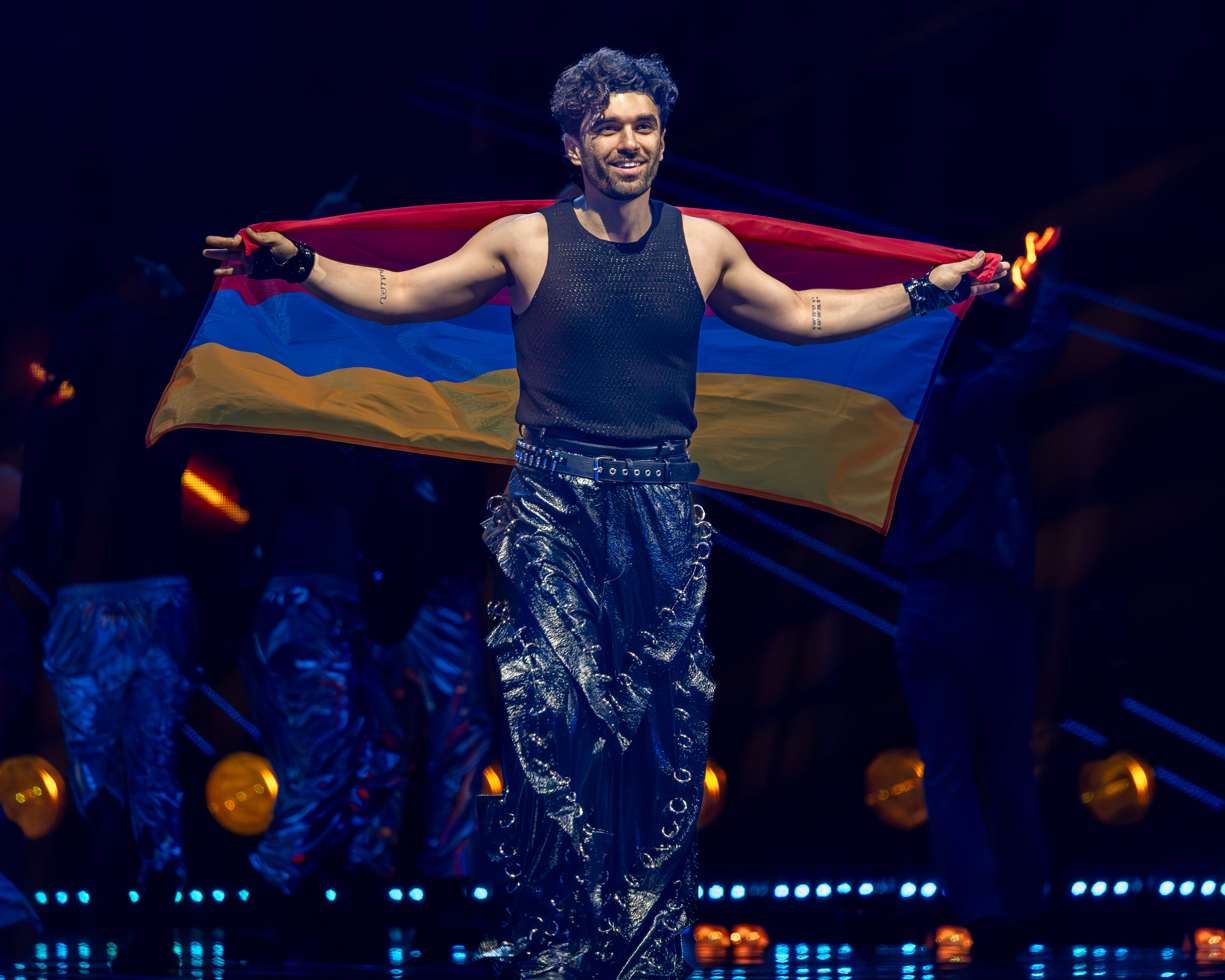
Parg during the flag parade of the final on 17 May 2025.

The Eurovision Song Contest 2025 took place at the St. Jakobshalle in Basel, Switzerland, and consisted of two semi-finals held on the respective dates of 13 and 15 May and the final on 17 May 2025. All nations with the exceptions of the host country and the "Big Five" (France, Germany, Italy, Spain and the United Kingdom) were required to qualify from one of two semi-finals in order to compete in the final; the top ten countries from each semi-final progressed to the final. On 28 January 2025, an allocation draw was held to determine which of the two semi-finals, as well as which half of the show, each country would perform in; the EBU split up the competing countries into different pots based on voting patterns from previous contests, with countries with favourable voting histories put into the same pot. Armenia was scheduled for the first half of the second semi-final. The shows' producers then decided the running order for the semi-finals; Armenia was set to perform in position 5.

=== Voting ===
==== Points awarded to Armenia ====
Points awarded to Armenia (Semi-final 2)
Score	Televote
12 points	Georgia; Israel
10 points	
8 points	France; Greece
7 points	
6 points	
5 points	Lithuania
4 points	
3 points	Czechia
2 points	
1 point	Latvia; Malta; Serbia

Points awarded to Armenia (Final)
Score	Televote	Jury
12 points	Georgia	Malta
10 points		France
8 points	France	
7 points		
6 points	Israel	
5 points		Israel
4 points		Latvia
3 points		Georgia; Greece
2 points	Cyprus; Greece	Serbia
1 point		Denmark; Ireland; Montenegro

==== Points awarded by Armenia ====
Points awarded by Armenia (Semi-final 2)
Score	Televote
12 points	Greece
10 points	Georgia
8 points	Austria
7 points	Malta
6 points	Finland
5 points	Czech Republic
4 points	Latvia
3 points	Denmark
2 points	Israel
1 point	Lithuania

Points awarded by Armenia (Final)
Score	Televote	Jury
12 points	Estonia	France
10 points	France	Finland
8 points	Greece	Austria
7 points	Austria	Switzerland
6 points	Sweden	Sweden
5 points	Germany	Malta
4 points	Norway	Ukraine
3 points	Albania	Netherlands
2 points	Netherlands	Estonia
1 point	Finland	Latvia

==== Detailed voting results ====
Each participating broadcaster assembles a five-member jury panel consisting of music industry professionals who are citizens of the country they represent. Each jury, and individual jury member, is required to meet a strict set of criteria regarding professional background, as well as diversity in gender and age. No member of a national jury was permitted to be related in any way to any of the competing acts in such a way that they cannot vote impartially and independently. The individual rankings of each jury member as well as the nation's televoting results were released shortly after the grand final.

The following members comprised the Armenian jury:

- Arthur Manukyan
- Simon Hovhannisyan
- Kristina Avagimyan
- Lilit Navasardyan
- Lilit Osipyan

Detailed voting results from Armenia (Semi-final 2)
R/O	Country	Televote	
R/O	Country	Rank	Points
01	Australia	14	
02	Montenegro	12	
03	Ireland	11	
04	Latvia	7	4
05	Armenia		
06	Austria	3	8
07	Greece	1	12
08	Lithuania	10	1
09	Malta	4	7
10	Georgia	2	10
11	Denmark	8	3
12	Czechia	6	5
13	Luxembourg	13	
14	Israel	9	2
15	Serbia	15	
16	Finland	5	6

Detailed voting results from Armenia (Final)
R/O	Country	Jury							Televote	
R/O	Country	Juror A	Juror B	Juror C	Juror D	Juror E	Rank	Points	Rank	Points
01	Norway	16	19	14	24	14	18		7	4
02	Luxembourg	24	24	23	23	22	24		19	
03	Estonia	8	4	6	21	17	9	2	1	12
04	Israel	25	25	21	22	25	25		11	
05	Lithuania	18	14	7	19	10	14		14	
06	Spain	14	18	16	18	16	17		20	
07	Ukraine	7	5	9	9	8	7	4	25	
08	United Kingdom	22	13	15	8	9	13		24	
09	Austria	4	3	3	3	4	3	8	4	7
10	Iceland	23	20	24	25	18	23		23	
11	Latvia	11	8	13	7	7	10	1	16	
12	Netherlands	5	11	8	6	19	8	3	9	2
13	Finland	2	2	2	2	2	2	10	10	1
14	Italy	13	12	12	14	5	11		13	
15	Poland	15	23	17	17	20	21		17	
16	Germany	12	9	11	12	13	12		6	5
17	Greece	19	10	20	13	11	15		3	8
18	Armenia									
19	Switzerland	3	21	4	5	3	4	7	18	
20	Malta	10	7	5	10	6	6	5	12	
21	Portugal	9	17	19	20	15	16		15	
22	Denmark	17	15	18	15	21	19		22	
23	Sweden	6	6	10	4	12	5	6	5	6
24	France	1	1	1	1	1	1	12	2	10
25	San Marino	21	22	22	11	24	20		21	
26	Albania	20	16	25	16	23	22		8	3
