= Go-Jo =

Australian singer-songwriter (born 1995)

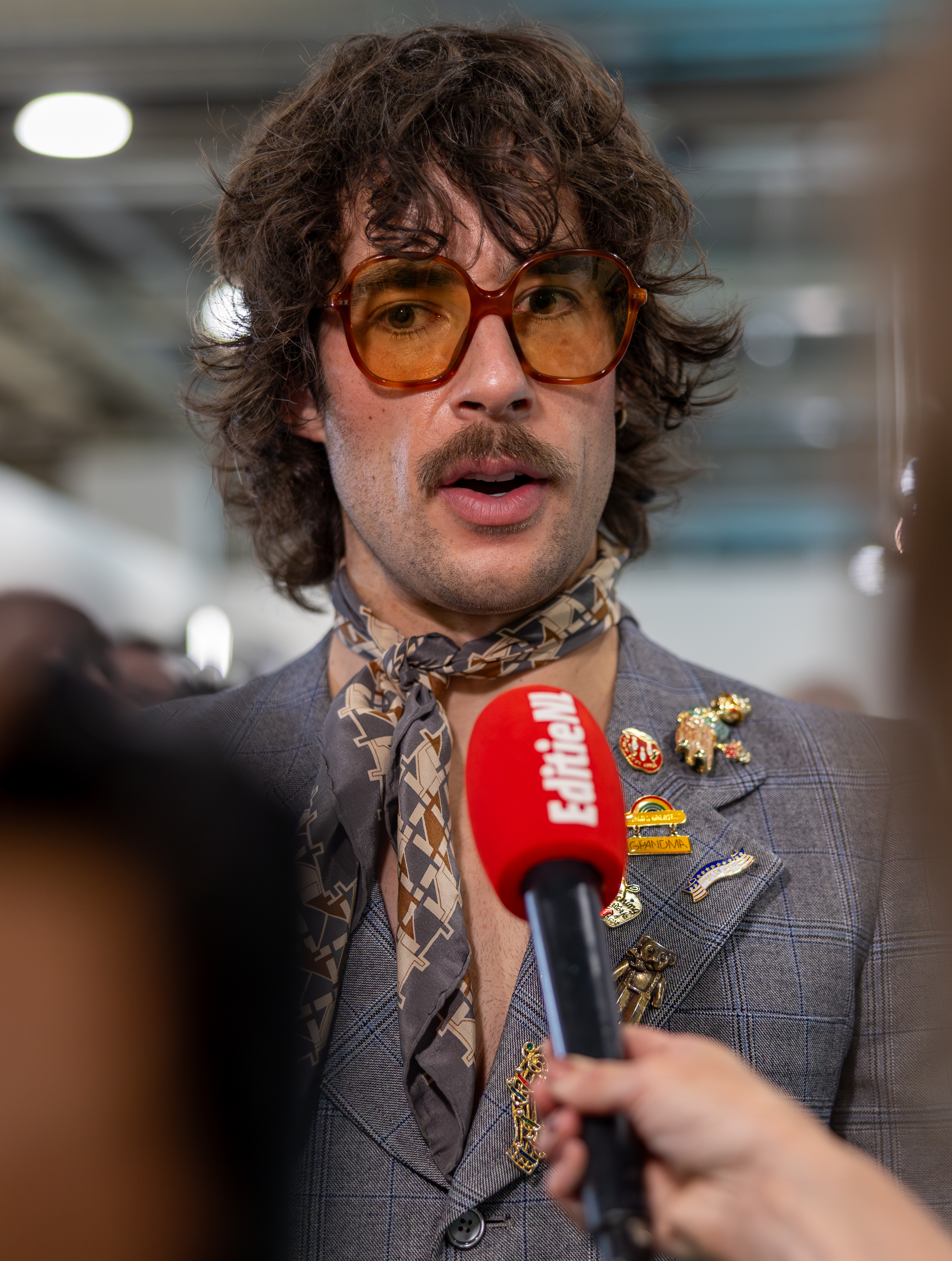
- Go-Jo interviewed at the 2025 Eurovision

Background information
- Born: Marty Joe Zambotto; November 23, 1995 (age 30); Manjimup, Western Australia, Australia
- Genre: Pop
- Occupations: Singer; songwriter; record producer
- Instrument: Vocals
- Years active: 2016–present

Marty Joe Zambotto (born 23 November 1995), known professionally as Go-Jo, is an Australian singer, songwriter, and record producer. He is best known for his song "Mrs. Hollywood" and his participation for Australia in the Eurovision Song Contest 2025 with the song "Milkshake Man".

== Biography ==
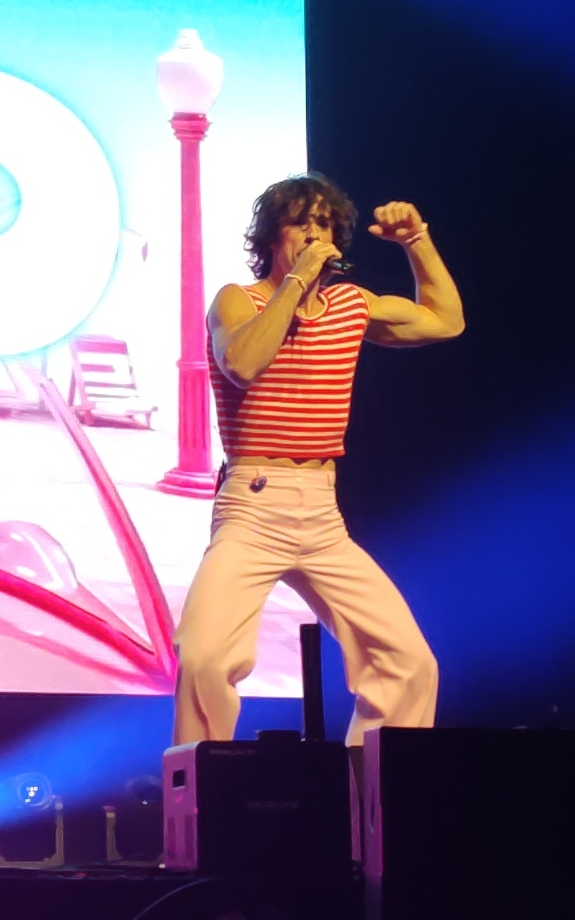
Zambotto performing at the 2025 Eurovision in Concert preparty

Zambotto grew up on a remote, self-sustaining estate just outside of Manjimup, Western Australia, which helped to develop his musical style and artistic identity.

The property was not connected to electricity and so to gain electricity they would use solar panels that were mounted on a car chassis and connected to twelve recycled car batteries and they would move the panels multiple times during the day to maximise their output. He has also commented that "...for our food... we had to, like grow vegetables..." and they also collected rain water from the gutters of their house and used it for drinking water. Zambotto has also commented that it was very rare when the TV would be on in their house and he discovered new songs through watching a lot of the music video television program Rage as well as through So Fresh compilations.

He has a twin sister and four brothers and his father is French, making Zambotto a dual national of Australia and France. His mother was a rock musician and the lead singer of a local rock act.

He received his first guitar at the age of 14 after his mother got him an electric guitar from ToyWorld and he began by covering songs from Green Day and heavy metal. At the age of 19 he was introduced to writing songs and music production and he has commented that, that was when "...everything changed. Before that, I hadn't really thought about it—it's funny to think that my subconscious must have perceived songs as just something that instantly existed. It wasn't until my best friend from my hometown showed me a beat he made and broke down each section for me. That was it—my mind was instantly rewired, like Peter Parker's when he was bitten by a spider in Spiderman. I could literally feel my DNA constructing a whole new universe with that explanation." He initially began writing, producing and mixing songs for other artists until it was later suggested to him by a song writer that he was writing a song with that he should begin singing on the tracks himself.

Throughout his upbringing Zambotto played Australian rules football at a high level and he moved to Perth where he competed at the semi-professional level for the East Perth Royals in the West Australian Football League as a teenager. Whilst in Perth he was also producing music for other artists and then he decided to give up AFL and he moved to Sydney to pursue music full-time. The idea for his stage name came from when his mother used to watch Zambotto on the sidelines of running races and she used to yell "Go, Jo!", with the "Jo" referring to his middle name, Joe.

Zambotto is known for his guitar-centric original songs and covers. He released his first song in 2016 and his cover of the Goo Goo Dolls' song "Iris" has received over 3 million streams on Spotify. A video of him performing his song "Mrs. Hollywood" at Bondi Beach has been viewed over six million times, with the song reaching one billion views across all video platforms. He has also performed as an opening act for the Jonas Brothers, Milky Chance and Tash Sultana.

On 25 February 2025, SBS announced that Zambotto would represent Australia in the Eurovision Song Contest 2025 in Basel with the song "Milkshake Man". They competed on 15 May 2025, opening the second semifinal while failing to qualify for the grand final.

At the Eurovision Song Contest 2026, Go-Jo performed an interval act alongside hosts Michael Ostrowski and Victoria Swarovski, differentiating Australia and Austria.

Go-Jo's debut album, The Go-Jo Variety Show was released on 26 June 2026.

== Discography ==
=== Albums ===
List of albums, with selected details
Title	Details	Chart positions
Title	Details	AUS
The Go-Jo Variety Show	Released: 26 June 2026; Label: Chugg Music; Format: CD, LP, digital	48

=== Charted singles ===
Title	Year	Chart positions			
Title	Year	AUS Indie	LTU	SWE Heat.	UK DL.
"Mrs. Hollywood"	2023	18	—	—	—
"Milkshake Man"	2025	—	30	16	61
"—" denotes a recording that did not chart or was not released in that territory.

== Awards and nominations ==
Year	Award	Category	Nominee(s)	Result	Ref.
2025	Eurovision Awards	Non-Qualifying Show-Stopper	Himself	Won	

Awards and achievements
Preceded by Electric Fields with "One Milkali (One Blood)"	Australia in the Eurovision Song Contest; 2025	Succeeded by Delta Goodrem with "Eclipse"
