= Milkshake Man =

2025 single by Go-Jo

Single by Go-Jo

from the album The Go-Jo Variety Show
- Released: 25 February 2025
- Genre: Synth-pop
- Length: 2:52
- Label: Chugg Music; Rix Records
- Songwriters: Marty Zambotto; Amy Sheppard; George Sheppard; Jason Bovino
- Producers: Jason Bovino; George Sheppard; Marty Zambotto

Go-Jo singles chronology
"Cry About" (2024)	"Milkshake Man" (2025)	"Appetite" (2025)

Music video
- "Milkshake Man" on YouTube

Eurovision Song Contest 2025 entry
- Country: Australia
- Artist: Go-Jo
- Language: English

Finals performance
- Semi-final result: 11th
- Semi-final points: 41

Entry chronology
- ◄ "One Milkali (One Blood)" (2024)
- "Eclipse" (2026) ►

Official performance video
- "Milkshake Man" (second semi-final) on YouTube

"Milkshake Man" is a song by Australian singer and songwriter Go-Jo. It was written by Go-Jo alongside Amy Sheppard, George Sheppard, and Jason Bovino. The song was released on 25 February 2025 and represented Australia in the Eurovision Song Contest 2025. It entered the charts in Sweden, Lithuania, and Iceland.

== Background and composition ==
Milkshake Man was written by Go-Jo alongside Amy Sheppard, George Sheppard, and Jason Bovino, all current or former members of the band Sheppard, which competed in the first edition of Eurovision – Australia Decides in 2019 with "On My Way". The song, characterised by synth pop sounds, aims to be a "motivational push" for the listener, encouraging them to discover "the most colourful version of themselves and feel confident". In addition to its positive message, the lyrics play on subtle double entendres, suggesting more daring and provocative nuances behind the playful and light-hearted facade. The song contains some lyrics in French, which Go-Jo said was included due to his French nationality. "Milkshake Man" samples "Greensleeves", which is a chime commonly used by ice cream vans in various countries.

The writing process began when Go-Jo went to Brisbane for a writing camp for two days with Sheppard and Jason Bovino and they wrote around ten songs which Go-Jo described as "...one of the funnest sessions we've ever done". The bridge for Milkshake Man was taken from a second song that had been written during this time and then added to Milkshake Man and this also gave the song an impact with the breakdown that follows the bridge. Go-Jo has commented that the ideas for Milkshake Man "...came to me when I was on the couch, I was just saying things, the original line started with "I'm in love with the Milkshake man...". To gain a deep voice when recording the lowest parts of the vocals in Milkshake Man Go-Jo stayed up extra late so that his voice would be "more croaky".

== Music video ==
The music video for Milkshake Man, directed by Josh Harris, was made available to coincide with the single's release through Go-Jo's YouTube channel. In the video, the singer, along with two women, is busy making milkshakes inside a traditional ice cream truck, while the atmosphere is charged with a festive energy and strobe effects.

== Promotion ==
To promote "Milkshake Man" before the Eurovision Song Contest 2025 Go-Jo spent eight weeks in Europe and travelled to fifteen countries leading up to the Song Contest in May. During this time Go-Jo performed the song at the Amsterdam, London and Madrid Eurovision pre-parties. It was first announced that he will be performing at Eurovision in Concert 2025 held at AFAS Live Arena in Amsterdam on 5 April 2025. He then participated in the London Eurovision Party 2025 on 13 April 2025 held at Here at Outernet. and then at PrePartyES 2025 on 19 April 2025 held at Sala La Riviera in Madrid. Following the Eurovision pre-parties, Go-Jo further promoted his participation in Italy, Estonia, and Latvia.

The song was also played by either Sheppard themselves or with a guest performance of Go-Jo himself during Sheppard's European Tour 2025.

== Eurovision Song Contest ==
=== Internal selection ===
On 25 February 2025, public broadcaster SBS announced that it had internally selected Go-Jo with the song "Milkshake Man" to represent Australia at the Eurovision Song Contest 2025 in Basel. The single was made available digitally from the same day.

=== Preparation ===
Whilst staying in a hotel room in Estonia three weeks prior to Eurovision 2025, Go-Jo was rehearsing his vocals for the Milkshake Man whilst listening to the song on headphones and due to the song playing in his headphones he had been unable to hear people who had been knocking on the door of his hotel room in response to his singing. Then later on after he had finished singing, three police arrived at the door of his room whilst he was in a live stream with other Eurovision 2025 artists, Sissal, Kyle Alessandro and Klavdia. The police briefly spoke to Go-Jo in relation to the singing he had been doing earlier and then he returned to the live stream and spoke to the other Eurovision artists about what had happened.

=== At Eurovision ===
The Eurovision Song Contest 2025 took place at St. Jakobshalle in Basel, Switzerland, and consisted of two semi-finals held on the respective dates of 13 and 15 May and the final on 17 May 2025. During the allocation draw held on 28 January 2025, Australia was drawn to compete in the second semi-final, performing in the first half of the show. Go-Jo was later drawn to open the second semi-final. Australia failed to qualify for the grand final.

== Track listing ==
Digital download/streaming

1. "Milkshake Man" – 3:04

Digital download/streaming – Jolyon Petch remix

1. "Milkshake Man" (Jolyon Petch Remix Edit) – 2:42
2. "Milkshake Man" (Jolyon Petch Remix) – 3:32

== Charts ==
Chart performance for "Milkshake Man"
Chart (2025)	Peak position
Iceland (Tónlistinn)	40
Lithuania (AGATA)	30
Sweden Heatseeker (Sverigetopplistan)	16
UK Indie Breakers (OCC)	19
UK Singles Downloads (Official Charts)	61
UK Singles Sales (OCC)	64

== Release history ==
Release dates and formats for "Milkshake Man"
Region	Date	Format(s)	Version	Label	Ref.
Various	25 February 2025	Digital download; streaming	Original	Chugg Music; Rix Records	
Various	2 May 2025	Digital download; streaming	Jolyon Petch remix	Chugg Music; Rix Records	
