= Iceland in the Eurovision Song Contest 2025 =

- Eurovision Song Contest 2025
- Participating broadcaster: Ríkisútvarpið (RÚV)
- Country: Iceland
- Selection process: Söngvakeppnin 2025
- Selection date: 22 February 2025

Competing entry
- Song: "Róa"
- Artist: Væb
- Songwriters: Gunnar Björn Gunnarsson; Matthías Davíð Matthíasson; Hálfdán Helgi Matthíasson; Ingi Þór Garðarsson

Placement
- Semi-final result: Qualified (6th, 97 points)
- Final result: 25th, 33 points

Participation chronology

Iceland was represented at the Eurovision Song Contest 2025 with the song "Róa", written by Gunnar Björn Gunnarsson, Hálfdán Helgi Matthíasson, Ingi Þór Garðarsson, and Matthías Davíð Matthíasson, and performed by Hálfdán and Matthías as Væb. The Icelandic participating broadcaster, Ríkisútvarpið (RÚV), organised the national final Söngvakeppnin 2025 in order to select its entry for the contest.

== Background ==
Prior to the 2025 contest, Ríkisútvarpið (RÚV) had participated in the Eurovision Song Contest representing Iceland forty times since its first entry in 1986. Its best placing in the contest to this point was second, which it achieved on two occasions: in 1999 with the song "All Out of Luck" performed by Selma and in 2009 with the song "Is It True?" performed by Yohanna. It also reached two more top-5 positions: in 1990 with the song "Eitt lag enn" performed by Stjórnin and in 2021 with the song "10 Years" performed by Daði og Gagnamagnið, ending fourth on both occasions. Since the introduction of semi-finals in 2004, it had failed to qualify to the final nine times, including in 2024, when the song "Scared of Heights" performed by Hera Björk placed last in the first semi-final.

As part of its duties as participating broadcaster, RÚV organises the selection of its entry in the Eurovision Song Contest and broadcasts the event in the country. From 2006 to 2020 and again since 2022, it selected its entry through Söngvakeppnin, a televised national competition. Initially, RÚV was supposed to decide on its participation in the 2025 contest on 5 September 2024. However, Rúnar Freyr Gíslason, Iceland's head of delegation, stated that RÚV postponed its decision. A week later, RÚV confirmed its intention to participate in the contest, subsequently announcing that its entry would again be selected through Söngvakeppnin.

== Before Eurovision ==
=== Söngvakeppnin 2025 ===
Söngvakeppnin 2025 is the national final organised by RÚV in order to select its entry for the Eurovision Song Contest 2025. It consists of two semi-finals on 8 and 15 February 2025 and a final on 22 February at RVK Studios located in northern Reykjavík. The shows are presented by Benedikt Valsson, Fannar Sveinsson, and Guðrún Dís Emilsdóttir. The semi-final qualifiers are determined by televoting, while a combination of seven international juries and public votes will be used to determine the results of the final. For the first time since 2013, there was no superfinal round in the final.

==== Competing entries ====
On 20 September 2024, RÚV opened the period for interested songwriters to submit their entries, lasting until 13 October. At the closing of the submission window, 110 entries had been received. The selected entries were taken into consideration by the contest's advisory selection committee, made up of representatives from the Icelandic Association of Composers and Lyricists, the Union of Icelandic Musicians, and RÚV. The ten selected entries were revealed on 17 January 2025 in the programme Lögin í Söngvakeppninni.

Prior to the event, Icelandic online newspaper DV reported that the song "Róa" by Væb was accused of resembling the song "HaTunat HaShana" by Israeli singers Itay Levi and Eyal Golan. A video was then posted on the online platform TikTok comparing the two songs. The duo denied the allegations, and the Söngvakeppnin board of directors sought advice from the Composers Rights Society of Iceland (STEF) to determine the similarity of the two songs. RÚV later concluded that the song in question did not exhibit sufficient substantive similarity to constitute plagiarism.

Artist	Song		Songwriter(s)
Artist	Icelandic title	English title	Songwriter(s)
Ágúst	"Eins og þú"	"Like You"	Ágúst Þór Brynjarsson; Hákon Guðni Hjartarson; Halldór Gunnar Pálsson
Bára Katrín	"Rísum upp"	"Rise Above"	Heiðar Kristjánsson; Lára Ómarsdóttir; Seinunn Ása Þorvaldsdóttir; Valgeir Magnússon
Bia	"Norðurljós"	"Northern Lights"	Beatriz Aleixo; Jóhannes Ágúst; Jón Arnór Styrmisson; Kolbeinn Egill Þrastarson; Kristrún Jóhannesdóttir
Birgo	"Ég flýg í storminn"	"Stormchaser"	Birgitta Ólafsdóttir; Helga Þórdís Guðmundsdóttir; Jonas Gladnikoff; Shawn Myers
Bjarni Arason	"Aðeins lengur"	—N/a	Björn Björnsson; Jóhann Helgason
Dagur Sig	"Flugdrekar"	"Carousel"	Andreas Lindbergh; Einar Lövdahl; Joy Deb; Linnea Deb; Thorsteinn Einarsson
Júlí and Dísa	"Eldur"	"Fire"	Andri Þór Jónsson; Birgir Steinn Stefánsson; Júlí Heiðar Halldórsson; Ragnar Már Jónsson
Stebbi Jak	"Frelsið mitt"	"Set Me Free"	Alda B. Lilliendahl Ólafsdóttir; Michael James Down; Primož Poglajen; Stefán Jakobsson; Will Taylor
Tinna	"Þrá"	"Words"	Guðný Ósk Karlsdóttir; Rob Price; Tinna Óðinsdóttir
Væb	"Róa"	—N/a	Hálfdán Helgi Matthíasson; Ingi Þór Garðarsson; Matthías Davíð Matthíasson

==== Semi-finals ====
Two semi-finals took place on 8 and 15 February 2025. Five entries performed in each, with three qualifying for the final. In addition to the performances of the competing entries, a number of guest performances were also featured during the two shows. The first semi-final was opened by Aron Can performing his songs "Monní" and "Poppstirni", while the second semi-final was opened by Yohanna (who represented Iceland in 2009) performing "Ne partez pas sans moi" by Celine Dion and her Eurovision entry "Is It True?". Helgi Björnsson and GDRN performed "Think About Things", the intended entry for Iceland in 2020, alongside the presenters.

Semi-final 1 – 8 February 2025
R/O	Artist	Song	Votes	Place
1	Stebbi Jak	"Frelsið mitt"	8,853	3
2	Birgo	"Ég flýg í storminn"	5,089	4
3	Ágúst	"Eins og þú"	10,069	2
4	Bia	"Norðurljós"	4,945	5
5	Væb	"Róa"	12,649	1

Semi-final 2 – 15 February 2025
R/O	Artist	Song	Votes	Place
1	Dagur Sig	"Flugdrekar"	7,400	4
2	Júlí and Dísa	"Eldur"	9,469	2
3	Bára Katrín	"Rísum upp"	6,218	5
4	Bjarni Arason	"Aðeins lengur"	9,323	3
5	Tinna	"Þrá"	9,846	1

==== Final ====
The final took place on 22 February 2025 and featured the six qualifiers from the semi-finals. While in the semi-finals all competing entries are required to be performed in Icelandic, in the final they have to be presented in the language they would be performed in at the Eurovision Song Contest: Væb and Bjarni Arason opted for the Icelandic version, while the other four entrants opted for the English one. In addition to the competing entries, Herra Hnetusmjör opened the show, while Hera Björk (who represented Iceland in 2010 and 2024), and Käärijä (who represented Finland in 2023) together with Swedish electronic duo Hooja performed as interval acts.

For the first time since 2012, there was no superfinal round in the final. The winner, "Róa" performed by Væb, was determined by votes from a seven-member international jury panel (50%) and public voting (50%). The international jury panel that voted consisted of Sietse Bakker (executive producer of the Eurovision Song Contest 2021 in Rotterdam, Netherlands), Saba (who represented Denmark in 2024), Ersin Parlak (Turkish music agent, head of press for the Sammarinese Eurovision delegation), Maria Sur (Ukrainian singer), Peter Fenner (British Eurovision expert), Niamh Kavanagh (who won Eurovision for Ireland in 1993 and again represented Ireland in 2010), and Damir Kedžo (who was selected to represent Croatia in 2020).

Final – 22 February 2025
R/O	Artist	Song	Jury	Televote		Total	Place
R/O	Artist	Song	Jury	Votes	Points	Total	Place
1	Ágúst	"Like You"	45	9,104	23	68	6
2	Bjarni Arason	"Aðeins lengur"	44	15,266	39	83	4
3	Júlí and Dísa	"Fire"	63	29,010	74	137	3
4	Væb	"Róa"	74	36,535	93	167	1
5	Tinna	"Words"	53	8,839	22	75	5
6	Stebbi Jak	"Set Me Free"	57	33,202	85	142	2

Detailed international jury votes
R/O	Song	S. Bakker	Saba	E. Parlak	M. Sur	P. Fenner	N. Kavanagh	D. Kedžo	Total
1	"Like You"	7	5	5	6	7	7	8	45
2	"Aðeins lengur"	6	6	6	5	10	5	6	44
3	"Fire"	10	10	10	8	8	12	5	63
4	"Róa"	8	12	12	10	12	10	10	74
5	"Words"	5	7	8	12	6	8	7	53
6	"Set Me Free"	12	8	7	7	5	6	12	57

==== Official album ====
Cover art of the official compilation album

Söngvakeppnin 2025 is the official compilation album of the contest. It was compiled by RÚV and was digitally released by Alda Music under the former's exclusive license on 17 January 2025. The album features both the Icelandic and English versions of the entries.

Weekly chart performance for Söngvakeppnin 2025
Chart (2025)	Peak position
Icelandic Albums (Tónlistinn)	4

== At Eurovision ==
The Eurovision Song Contest 2025 took place at St. Jakobshalle in Basel, Switzerland, and consisted of two semi-finals to be held on the respective dates of 13 and 15 May and the final on 17 May 2025. During the allocation draw held on 28 January 2025, Iceland was drawn to compete in the first semi-final, performing in the first half of the show. Iceland was then scheduled by the producers of the contest to open the first semi-final, performing first.

Iceland qualified for the Grand Final, finishing 6th out of 15 participants with 97 points.

In the Grand Final, Iceland were 10th in the running order, after eventual winner Austria and before Latvia. Iceland received no points from any of the juries, and received 33 points in the televote. In the televote, VÆB received 10 points from Denmark, 6 points from Finland, 5 points from Estonia and Sweden, 3 points from Norway, and 1 point from Austria, Croatia, Germany and Slovenia. They finished 25th out of 26 participants.

=== Voting ===
==== Points awarded to Iceland ====
Points awarded to Iceland (Semi-final 1)
Score	Televote
12 points	Sweden
10 points	Netherlands
8 points	Norway; Rest of the World
7 points	Croatia; Cyprus; Estonia
6 points	Poland
5 points	Albania; Belgium; Slovenia; Spain
4 points	Italy; Switzerland
3 points	
2 points	Portugal; Ukraine
1 point	

Points awarded to Iceland (Final)
Score	Televote	Jury
12 points		
10 points	Denmark	
8 points		
7 points		
6 points	Finland	
5 points	Estonia; Sweden	
4 points		
3 points	Norway	
2 points		
1 point	Austria; Croatia; Germany; Slovenia	

==== Points awarded by Iceland ====
Points awarded by Iceland (Semi-final 1)
Score	Televote
12 points	Sweden
10 points	Norway
8 points	Netherlands
7 points	Poland
6 points	Estonia
5 points	Belgium
4 points	Ukraine
3 points	San Marino
2 points	Albania
1 point	Portugal

Points awarded by Iceland (Final)
Score	Televote	Jury
12 points	Poland	Sweden
10 points	Sweden	Netherlands
8 points	Norway	Austria
7 points	Estonia	Switzerland
6 points	Netherlands	Norway
5 points	Finland	United Kingdom
4 points	Israel	France
3 points	Austria	Estonia
2 points	Denmark	Italy
1 point	Germany	Finland

==== Detailed voting results ====
Each participating broadcaster assembles a five-member jury panel consisting of music industry professionals who are citizens of the country they represent. Each jury, and individual jury member, is required to meet a strict set of criteria regarding professional background, as well as diversity in gender and age. No member of a national jury was permitted to be related in any way to any of the competing acts in such a way that they cannot vote impartially and independently. The individual rankings of each jury member as well as the nation's televoting results were released shortly after the grand final.

The following members comprised the Icelandic jury:

- Andri Þór Jónsson
- Bjarni Arason
- Sindri Ástmarsson
- Anita Rós Þorsteinsdóttir
- Hulda Geirsdóttir

Detailed voting results from Iceland (Semi-final 1)
R/O	Country	Televote	
R/O	Country	Rank	Points
01	Iceland		
02	Poland	4	7
03	Slovenia	13	
04	Estonia	5	6
05	Ukraine	7	4
06	Sweden	1	12
07	Portugal	10	1
08	Norway	2	10
09	Belgium	6	5
10	Azerbaijan	14	
11	San Marino	8	3
12	Albania	9	2
13	Netherlands	3	8
14	Croatia	12	
15	Cyprus	11	

Detailed voting results from Iceland (Final)
R/O	Country	Jury							Televote	
R/O	Country	Juror A	Juror B	Juror C	Juror D	Juror E	Rank	Points	Rank	Points
01	Norway	7	7	13	3	10	5	6	3	8
02	Luxembourg	16	20	19	12	13	19		22	
03	Estonia	9	6	10	9	7	8	3	4	7
04	Israel	15	19	23	8	11	16		7	4
05	Lithuania	13	24	20	18	24	23		12	
06	Spain	17	12	5	17	17	14		15	
07	Ukraine	22	22	21	15	21	25		16	
08	United Kingdom	3	18	25	7	5	6	5	18	
09	Austria	1	1	3	11	19	3	8	8	3
10	Iceland									
11	Latvia	24	10	16	24	25	20		14	
12	Netherlands	4	3	1	2	3	2	10	5	6
13	Finland	20	16	6	16	4	10	1	6	5
14	Italy	6	23	7	6	12	9	2	11	
15	Poland	25	9	22	4	20	13		1	12
16	Germany	10	13	15	22	18	18		10	1
17	Greece	14	15	18	23	22	21		21	
18	Armenia	21	11	11	20	15	17		25	
19	Switzerland	12	4	8	5	2	4	7	17	
20	Malta	5	14	9	21	14	12		23	
21	Portugal	19	25	14	25	16	22		24	
22	Denmark	8	8	17	19	6	11		9	2
23	Sweden	2	2	2	1	1	1	12	2	10
24	France	18	5	4	10	8	7	4	13	
25	San Marino	11	17	12	14	9	15		20	
26	Albania	23	21	24	13	23	24		19	
