= Italy in the Eurovision Song Contest 2025 =

- Eurovision Song Contest 2025
- Participating broadcaster: Radiotelevisione italiana (RAI)
- Country: Italy
- Selection process: Selection among Sanremo Music Festival 2025 entries
- Announcement date: 22 February 2025

Competing entry
- Song: "Volevo essere un duro"
- Artist: Lucio Corsi
- Songwriters: Lucio Corsi; Tommaso Ottomano

Placement
- Final result: 5th, 256 points

Participation chronology

Italy was represented at the Eurovision Song Contest 2025 with the song "Volevo essere un duro", written by Lucio Corsi and Tommaso Ottomano, and performed by Corsi himself. The Italian participating broadcaster, Radiotelevisione italiana (RAI), used the Sanremo Music Festival 2025 to select its entry, with "Balorda nostalgia" performed by Olly emerging as the winner. However, Olly declined the opportunity to represent Italy in the contest, with RAI appointing runner-up Corsi as its entrant.

As a member of the "Big Five", Italy automatically qualifies to compete in the final of the Eurovision Song Contest.

== Background ==
Prior to the 2025 contest, Radiotelevisione italiana (RAI) had participated in the Eurovision Song Contest representing Italy forty-eight times since its first entry at the inaugural contest in 1956. Since then, it has won the contest on three occasions: in 1964 with the song "Non ho l'età" performed by Gigliola Cinquetti, in 1990 with "Insieme: 1992" by Toto Cutugno, and in 2021 with "Zitti e buoni" by Måneskin. RAI has withdrawn from the contest a number of times, with its most recent absence spanning from 1998 until 2010. It made its return in 2011, with its entry "Madness of Love" performed by Raphael Gualazzi, placing second—its highest result, to that point, since its victory in 1990. A number of top 10 placements followed in subsequent editions, including its third victory in 2021. In 2024, it placed seventh with "La noia" performed by Angelina Mango.

As part of its duties as participating broadcaster, RAI organises the selection of its entry in the Eurovision Song Contest and broadcasts the event in the country. Between 2011 and 2013 and since 2015, RAI has regularly used the Sanremo Music Festival to select its entrant to the contest, at first through an intermediate stage of internal selection among the contestants, and after 2014 (when a full internal selection took place), the winner of the festival has always earned the right of first refusal to represent Italy in the Eurovision Song Contest.

== Before Eurovision ==
=== Sanremo Music Festival 2025 ===
RAI organised the Sanremo Music Festival 2025, the 75th edition of the event, between 11 and 15 February 2025. On 20 August 2024, the broadcaster published the rules of the competition, confirming that the winner of the festival's Big Artists section would earn the right to represent Italy in the Eurovision Song Contest.

29 artists competed in the Big Artists section over the course of five consecutive nights, selected by the artistic director Carlo Conti by direct invitation and from public submissions, and their names were announced on 1 December 2024. Three former Italian Eurovision entrants were among the competing artists: Massimo Ranieri (1971 and 1973), Francesca Michielin (2016), and Francesco Gabbani (2017), as well as Achille Lauro, who represented San Marino in 2022. Additionally, Noemi's entry was co-written by Mahmood and Blanco, both of whom represented Italy in 2022 (the former having previously competed in 2019). Blanco also co-wrote Giorgia and Irama's entries.

==== Final ====
The final of the festival took place on 15 February 2025. All of the artists performed their songs one final time, with a combination of public televoting (34%), radio jury voting (33%) and press jury voting (33%) being summed up to the results obtained in the previous nights to determine five qualifiers for the superfinal round. The same system then selected the winner, Olly with the song "Balorda nostalgia". In the winner's press conference the following morning, Olly stated that he has yet to decide on his Eurovision participation, with RAI granting him until 23 February to make a decision. On 22 February, Olly confirmed that he would not represent Italy in the contest, due to scheduling conflicts with his concert tour in May. RAI subsequently announced that it had appointed the runner-up, Lucio Corsi with "Volevo essere un duro", as its entrant.

Superfinal – 15 February 2025
| R/O | Artist | Song | Provisional ranking | Second round rankings | | | Total score | Final ranking |
| R/O | Artist | Song | Provisional ranking | Radio jury | Press jury | Televote score | Total score | Final ranking |
|---|---|---|---|---|---|---|---|---|
| 1 | Fedez | "Battito" | 5 | 5 | 4 | 20.51% | 17.67% | 4 |
| 2 | Simone Cristicchi | "Quando sarai piccola" | 4 | 4 | 5 | 6.13% | 14.78% | 5 |
| 3 | Brunori Sas | "L'albero delle noci" | 1 | 3 | 3 | 16.61% | 20.32% | 3 |
| 4 | Lucio Corsi | "Volevo essere un duro" | 3 | 1 | 1 | 25.70% | 23.39% | 2 |
| 5 | Olly | "Balorda nostalgia" | 2 | 2 | 2 | 31.05% | 23.84% | 1 |

== At Eurovision ==
=== Voting ===
==== Points awarded to Italy ====
Points awarded to Italy (Final)
| Score | Televote | Jury |
|---|---|---|
| 12 points | Slovenia | Croatia; Georgia; Portugal; San Marino; Slovenia; Switzerland |
| 10 points | Albania; Austria | Azerbaijan; Lithuania |
| 8 points | Malta; Portugal; Switzerland | Denmark; Poland; Ukraine |
| 7 points | Estonia; Ukraine | |
| 6 points | Croatia; Lithuania | France |
| 5 points | | Belgium; Germany |
| 4 points | | Estonia; Greece; Malta; Spain |
| 3 points | France; San Marino | Cyprus; Czechia; Israel |
| 2 points | Germany; Latvia; Netherlands | Iceland |
| 1 point | Belgium; Montenegro; Sweden | |

==== Points awarded by Italy ====
Points awarded by Italy (Semi-final 1)
| Score | Televote |
|---|---|
| 12 points | San Marino |
| 10 points | Albania |
| 8 points | Estonia |
| 7 points | Ukraine |
| 6 points | Sweden |
| 5 points | Netherlands |
| 4 points | Iceland |
| 3 points | Poland |
| 2 points | Norway |
| 1 point | Portugal |

Points awarded by Italy (Final)
| Score | Televote | Jury |
|---|---|---|
| 12 points | San Marino | United Kingdom |
| 10 points | Albania | Estonia |
| 8 points | Israel | Germany |
| 7 points | Estonia | Denmark |
| 6 points | Ukraine | San Marino |
| 5 points | Sweden | Malta |
| 4 points | Austria | Switzerland |
| 3 points | Poland | Albania |
| 2 points | Greece | Ukraine |
| 1 point | Norway | Finland |

==== Detailed voting results ====
Each participating broadcaster assembles a five-member jury panel consisting of music industry professionals who are citizens of the country they represent. Each jury, and individual jury member, is required to meet a strict set of criteria regarding professional background, as well as diversity in gender and age. No member of a national jury was permitted to be related in any way to any of the competing acts in such a way that they cannot vote impartially and independently. The individual rankings of each jury member as well as the nation's televoting results were released shortly after the grand final.

The following members comprised the Italian jury:

- Andrea Settembre
- Diego Calvetti
- Mattia Marzi
- Giulia Ausani
- Manola Moslehi

Detailed voting results from Italy (Semi-final 1)
| R/O | Country | Televote | | |
| R/O | Country | Percentage | Rank | Points |
|---|---|---|---|---|
| 01 | Iceland | 2.77% | 7 | 4 |
| 02 | Poland | 2.61% | 8 | 3 |
| 03 | Slovenia | 1.23% | 11 | |
| 04 | Estonia | 7.46% | 3 | 8 |
| 05 | Ukraine | 5.46% | 4 | 7 |
| 06 | Sweden | 3.00% | 5 | 6 |
| 07 | Portugal | 1.52% | 10 | 1 |
| 08 | Norway | 2.27% | 9 | 2 |
| 09 | Belgium | 0.96% | 13 | |
| 10 | Azerbaijan | 0.86% | 15 | |
| 11 | San Marino | 54.65% | 1 | 12 |
| 12 | Albania | 12.43% | 2 | 10 |
| 13 | Netherlands | 2.88% | 6 | 5 |
| 14 | Croatia | 0.97% | 12 | |
| 15 | Cyprus | 0.92% | 14 | |

Detailed voting results from Italy (Final)
| R/O | Country | Jury | | | | | | | Televote | | |
| R/O | Country | Juror A | Juror B | Juror C | Juror D | Juror E | Rank | Points | Percentage | Rank | Points |
|---|---|---|---|---|---|---|---|---|---|---|---|
| 01 | Norway | 19 | 23 | 17 | 19 | 25 | 24 | | 1.90% | 10 | 1 |
| 02 | Luxembourg | 24 | 15 | 11 | 13 | 17 | 20 | | 0.99% | 19 | |
| 03 | Estonia | 2 | 3 | 2 | 3 | 9 | 2 | 10 | 6.18% | 4 | 7 |
| 04 | Israel | 17 | 9 | 8 | 25 | 16 | 17 | | 11.44% | 3 | 8 |
| 05 | Lithuania | 21 | 5 | 5 | 24 | 21 | 11 | | 0.95% | 20 | |
| 06 | Spain | 16 | 25 | 18 | 17 | 19 | 23 | | 1.51% | 13 | |
| 07 | Ukraine | 12 | 4 | 7 | 14 | 12 | 9 | 2 | 5.00% | 5 | 6 |
| 08 | United Kingdom | 5 | 2 | 1 | 4 | 2 | 1 | 12 | 0.45% | 24 | |
| 09 | Austria | 23 | 21 | 25 | 21 | 22 | 25 | | 2.18% | 7 | 4 |
| 10 | Iceland | 15 | 22 | 16 | 10 | 14 | 19 | | 1.49% | 14 | |
| 11 | Latvia | 25 | 14 | 24 | 9 | 23 | 21 | | 1.08% | 17 | |
| 12 | Netherlands | 13 | 19 | 14 | 8 | 6 | 15 | | 1.77% | 11 | |
| 13 | Finland | 14 | 24 | 3 | 7 | 24 | 10 | 1 | 1.01% | 18 | |
| 14 | Italy | | | | | | | | | | |
| 15 | Poland | 18 | 17 | 19 | 11 | 18 | 22 | | 2.15% | 8 | 3 |
| 16 | Germany | 1 | 1 | 12 | 20 | 3 | 3 | 8 | 1.53% | 12 | |
| 17 | Greece | 9 | 16 | 23 | 15 | 10 | 18 | | 1.90% | 9 | 2 |
| 18 | Armenia | 20 | 10 | 6 | 23 | 20 | 16 | | 0.85% | 22 | |
| 19 | Switzerland | 4 | 11 | 15 | 12 | 5 | 7 | 4 | 0.72% | 23 | |
| 20 | Malta | 10 | 20 | 20 | 2 | 7 | 6 | 5 | 0.89% | 21 | |
| 21 | Portugal | 11 | 13 | 4 | 22 | 11 | 12 | | 1.14% | 16 | |
| 22 | Denmark | 3 | 7 | 13 | 16 | 1 | 4 | 7 | 0.41% | 25 | |
| 23 | Sweden | 8 | 12 | 22 | 5 | 13 | 13 | | 2.58% | 6 | 5 |
| 24 | France | 6 | 18 | 9 | 18 | 8 | 14 | | 1.20% | 15 | |
| 25 | San Marino | 7 | 6 | 10 | 6 | 4 | 5 | 6 | 34.16% | 1 | 12 |
| 26 | Albania | 22 | 8 | 21 | 1 | 15 | 8 | 3 | 16.52% | 2 | 10 |
