= Adonxs =

Slovak singer (born 1995)

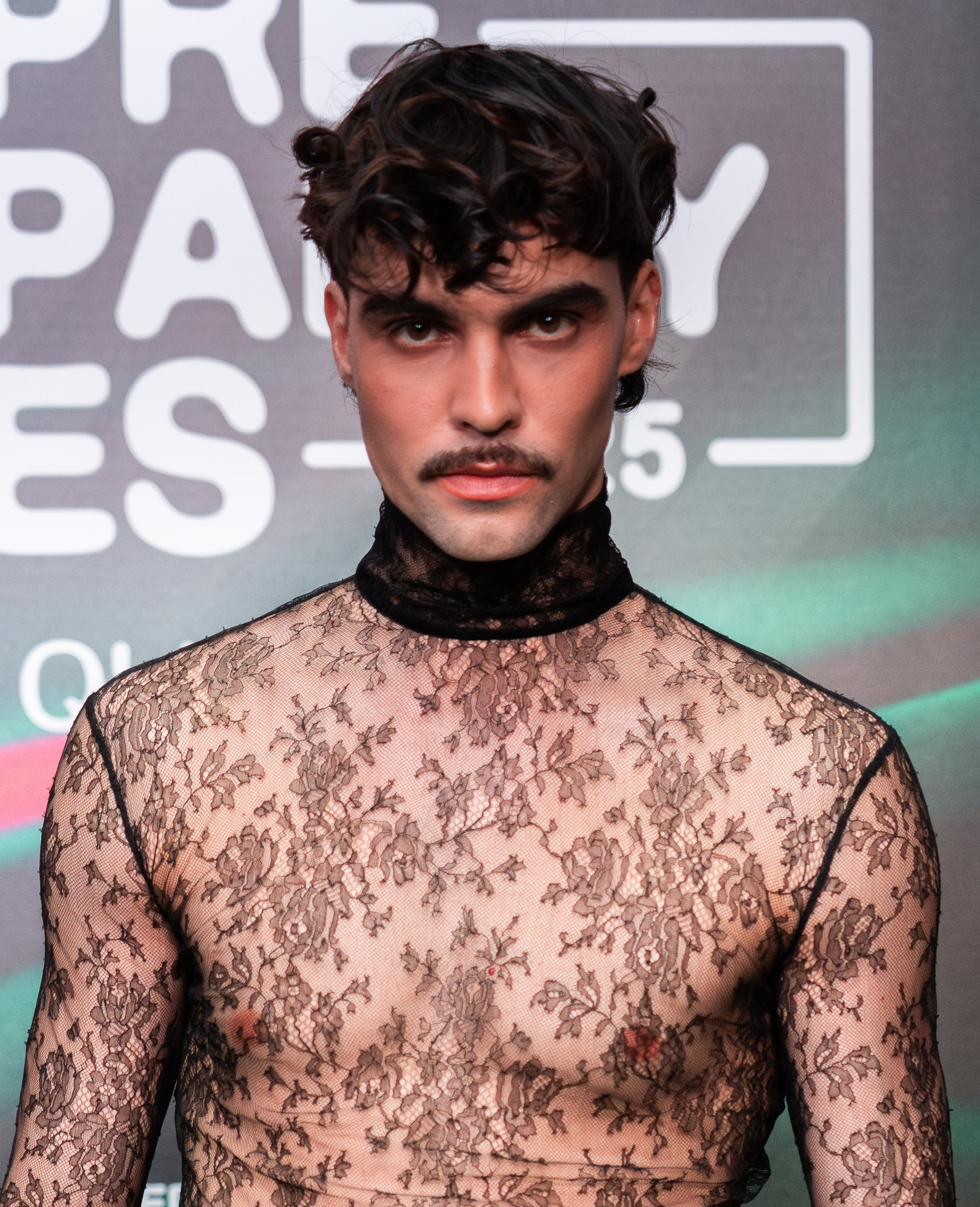
- Adonxs in 2025

Background information
- Born: Adam Pavlovčin; 13 September 1995 (age 31); Myjava, Slovakia
- Genres: Pop; baroque pop
- Occupations: Singer; songwriter
- Instrument: Vocals
- Years active: 2015–present
- Label: Warner
- Formerly of: Pace

Adam Pavlovčin (Note: British English: /ˈpʌvlɒvtʃɪn/ PUV-lov-chin, Slovak: [ˈpaʋlɔwtʂin], Czech: [ˈpavloftʃɪn].) (born 13 September 1995), known professionally as Adonxs (/əˈdɒnɪs/ ə-DON-iss; stylised in all caps), is a Slovak singer, best known as the lead singer of the London-based alternative band Pace. He released his debut solo studio album Age of Adonxs in 2022, earning him numerous accolades including Album of the Year, Best Male Artist or Best New Artist in Slovakia. He represented Czechia in the Eurovision Song Contest 2025 with the song "Kiss Kiss Goodbye", but failed to qualify for the Grand Final.

== Early life ==
Born Adam Pavlovčin in Myjava and raised in Senica, Adonxs took an interest in dancing and singing at an early age, inspired by his older sister. Following in her footsteps, he joined a junior dance crew, took singing lessons and began learning the piano. However, in his teenage years, he experienced a significant voice change associated with puberty, which caused him to lose his vocal range, with his voice dropping from tenor to basso profondo, the lowest bass. As a result, he quit singing.

Focusing on dancing instead, he performed with professional dance crews and went on to win the Slovak Championship in the IDO street dance disciplines five times in both junior and adult categories. When he was fifteen, he moved away from his family to Bratislava to attend C.S. Lewis Bilingual High School and took acting classes at an academy located in the New Scene theater. At 16, he signed with a modeling agency.

Subsequently, he rediscovered singing and moved to Prague to be classically trained by renowned opera singer Hana Peckova, whom he credits with expanding his bass vocal range up into his pre-teen tenor. He made a living as a freelance artist in Prague for a year before moving to London to pursue a career in music.

He earned his bachelor's degree in Songwriting and Creative Musicianship at the British and Irish Modern Music Institute in London, United Kingdom, graduating with first class honours.

Struggling to pay for tuition and living expenses while pursuing a degree, he took on various jobs, including working as a server at a gay bar, to make ends meet. In an interview with Cosmopolitan, he said: "Often times I would finish my night shift at the bar at 3 a.m. and start my singing class at 9 a.m." Adonxs, who came out as gay to his parents two weeks after "falling madly in love" with a boy at 18, has described his university years in London as the time of "complete liberation" and "self discovery", with a profound impact on his songwriting, on developing his style and stage persona.

At the age of 18, Adonxs wrote his first song "Speechless Boy" and released a low budget music video that served as his public coming out.

== Career ==
=== Music ===
==== 2015–2020: Lead singer of Pace ====
While still in high school, Adonxs formed the "genre-bending" music group PACE with his classmate, now film music composer Adrián Čermák. After moving to London, the duo were joined by two other musicians, a guitarist from Monaco and a drummer from Greece.

In early 2018, the multicultural formation released their debut EP titled Keeper, an alternative, predominantly baroque pop record that incorporates elements of symphony orchestra, while its lyricism speaks of Adonxs as a "man trapped in his desires and visions". A year later, PACE released the single "Hunt Me Down", followed by "Fallen" in 2020. They went on to play London's venues, British festivals, Pride parades, and were an opening act for British singer Grace Carter before their remaining scheduled performances were canceled due to the COVID-19 pandemic.

Following the pandemic restrictions on live music venues in the United Kingdom, Adonxs moved back to Prague, Czechia to embark on a solo career in 2021.

==== 2021: Winner of SuperStar ====
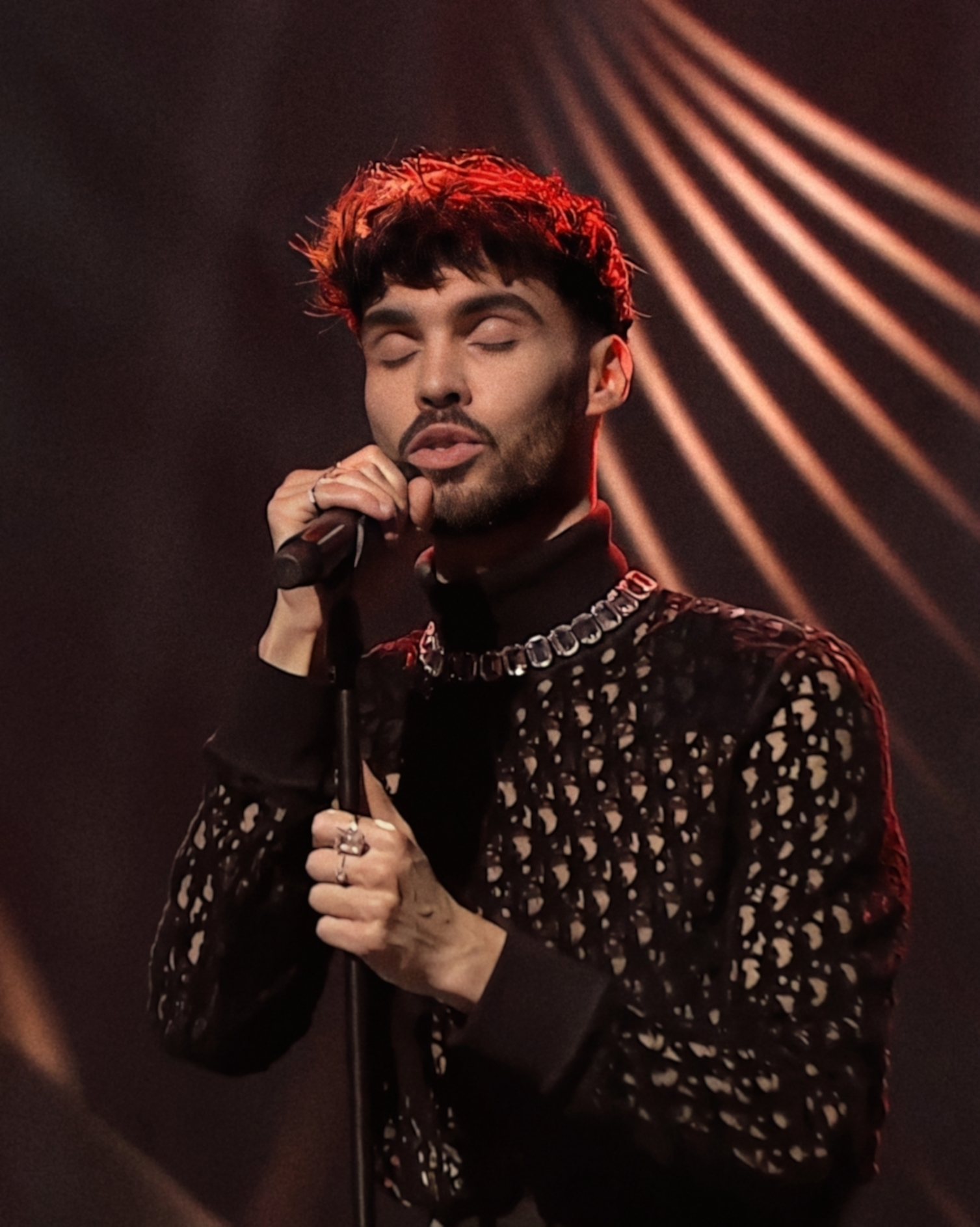
Adonxs performing in 2021

In 2021, Adonxs rose to prominence in his native country and Czechia after winning SuperStar, the seventh season of the joint Czech-Slovak version of Idols. Approached by producers to go on the show, an invitation he declined multiple times in the past, Adonxs stirred controversy with his performances in gender nonconforming outfits (including a translucent dress), to which he responded with "Clothes have no gender". He is the first openly queer winner of the joint singing competition and has described his victory as a "huge step forward" for the Czech and Slovak society. In an interview with ELLE, which pointed out his popularity as a queer artist in a conservative society, Adonxs reflected on the impact of his success: "I believe my victory has helped pave the way for other queer entertainers, actors, or politicians to come out and not be afraid to be their authentic, queer selves."

==== 2022–present: Solo career ====
Following the win, he signed with Warner and began writing and recording his debut album at Lavagance Studios with producers Oliver Fillner, Marek Rakovicky and Tom Lobb. In January, he received a nomination for Best New Artist at the 2021 Ruka Hore Awards, despite not having officially released any solo material yet. In Slovakia, Forbes honored him in Forbes 30 Under 30.

On 20 May, he released his debut solo single "Moving On" under the mononymous stage name Adonxs (the gender-fluid 'x' is pronounced /ɪ/, as in Adonis). The alter ego Adonxs refers to a Greek mythological figure, the Greek god of beauty and desire Adonis, who, though a symbol of masculinity, was feminized in Ancient Greek literature, and depicted as sexually ambiguous, androgynous. Adonxs came up with the concept of his alter ego during his studies in London to liberate himself on stage and overcome his then "tremendous" fear of performing in front of audience. The song reflects on closing the door on his past toxic, stagnant relationship, and celebrates entering a new, liberated era. Prior to release, he world premiered the song with a live performance on Let's Dance on 24 April. In the music video for "Moving On", Adonxs is wearing a custom skintight garment adorned with hand-sewn crystals by Preciosa, a look he previously teased on Let's Dance. The debut solo single marked his first number one on the SK Top 50 Chart.

On 4 June, he premiered an unreleased duet version of "Moving On" with Celeste Buckingham. On 11 June, as the only Slovak artist in the lineup, Adonxs played at Lovestream Festival headlined by Dua Lipa, where he premiered his upcoming singles "Game" and "Cold Summer". On 19 August, Adonxs released his second single "Game", which he had announced as the "most mainstream song on the album". The song marked his second number one on the SK Top 50 Chart, where it reigned atop for eight consecutive weeks. The accompanying music video featuring an authentic Adonxs Barbie doll was described as "slightly creepy", "kinky" and "very queer", while Adonxs explained that the doll play analogy in the video depicts the parallel between manipulation in romantic relationships and the way the entertainment industry treats a new artist. The video received a nomination at the 2023 Berlin Music Video Awards. On 18 October, he released his third single "Cold Summer", a piano ballad. His debut solo album Age of Adonxs was released in November 2022. Musicserver rated it as the best album of 2022 in Slovakia. In early 2023, he received two Evropa 2 Music Awards for Best Male Artist and Best New Artist, as well as a nomination for Best Song with "Moving On". At the 2022 Ruka Hore Awards, he earned a nomination for Artist of the Year, Album of the Year, and received the Europa 2 Song of the Year award. In the Czech Republic, the album Age of Adonxs was prenominated for the Anděl Award for the best Slovak album of 2022.

In May 2023, Adonxs was announced to perform at the Sziget Festival in Budapest on 13 August. On 8 July, he performed at the Pohoda festival. On 28 July, he released his fourth single, "No Common Measure". On 22 November, he released "Overthinker", stylized as "OVRTHNKR" for the single version, as the fifth single from the album. In the music video, Adonxs raises awareness on the Adonis complex, a term used in psychology to describe the "anxiety and insecurity experienced by boys and men about their appearance or body images", which can lead to body dysmorphic disorder. In 2024, Adonxs was nominated for the 2023 Crystal Wing Award in the pop music category. He released his first song in Slovak language, "Sám", on 15 March.

In December 2024, Czech Television announced that it had internally selected Adonxs to represent Czechia in the Eurovision Song Contest 2025, which would be held in Basel, Switzerland. His native country, Slovakia, has not participated in the contest since 2012. On 4 February 2025, Adonxs premiered the acoustic version of the song "Kiss Kiss Goodbye" during the first semi-final of Malta Eurovision Song Contest 2025, while its studio version was released on 7 March.

=== Dancing, modeling, acting ===
Apart from his music career, Adonxs is a professional dancer specializing in street dance, lyrical jazz, Latin dance. He is a five-time Slovak Champion in the IDO street dance disciplines, both in junior and adult categories. He was a member of the RDS Company, performed with the likes of Robbie Williams, Nicole Scherzinger or Leona Lewis, and trained with choreographers including Keone Madrid, Camillo Lauricella and Ian Eastwood.

Adonxs began modeling professionally at age 16. As a runway model, he walked for Alexander McQueen in Milan, as well as in London Fashion Week, and has been featured in campaigns for fashion designers that reject gender stereotypes of masculinity and femininity. He has garnered attention for supporting upcycling and sustainability. In 2022, he has become the face of Adidas Originals in Czechia. In August 2022, Adonxs hosted the 2022 Elite Model Look World Final.

He stars in the music video for "Euphoria" by NobodyListen, and also appears in the video for "The Riddle" by French singer Silly Boy Blue and in "24/7" by German artist MELINA. He plays the role of Bobby, one of the Kit Kat Club boys, in Joe Masteroff's jazz musical Cabaret, and the role of a heron in BURKICOM's Island! that reflects on environmental issues.

In November 2022, he finished second in the Slovak version of Your Face Sounds Familiar.

== Activism ==
Adonxs is the face of the award-winning ad campaign Every Love Is Love that features scenes of him kissing a man before turning to the camera, paraphrasing 1 Corinthians 13:4-7, a biblical text about love frequently read during wedding ceremonies. The Constitution of the Slovak Republic bans same-sex marriage and civil unions. "If I'd seen an ad like this in Slovakia as a little boy, I'm sure it would've had a very positive effect on my growing up." Speaking in late 2021, Adonxs said he had never considered himself an activist, but "my actions made me one".

In addition to the campaign, Adonxs has called for an official change of the definition of the word "love" (láska) in the Slovak dictionary, to make it inclusive of all sexual and gender identities. The current edition of the dictionary defines love as "an affection of an individual of one gender for an individual of another gender". In comparison, the Merriam-Webster dictionary of English language defines love (noun) as "a feeling of strong or constant affection for a person". The initiative has yielded a result as the linguistic scientists who authored the dictionary agreed to a change of the definition.

In March 2022, he participated in Artists for Ukraine, an initiative to raise funds for NGOs that provide humanitarian aid and shelter for refugees fleeing the Russian invasion of Ukraine, a neighboring country of his native Slovakia.

Adonxs performed at Pride parades in Brighton, Bratislava, and Prague. On 14 October, Adonxs performed at a protest march in memory of two queer victims of the 2022 terrorist attack outside an LGBT bar in Bratislava, Slovakia, carried out by a "radicalized" teenager with anti-LGBT and antisemitic beliefs. Addressing the crowd, Adonxs urged the public to "sow love, empathy and humility".

In early 2023, Adonxs was recognized for his LGBTQ+ activism with the Cena Inakosti Award.

== Artistry ==
Adonxs is a natural basso profondo, the deepest bass, while possessing a vocal range that extends up into tenor, which gives him a distinctive timbre in the upper register. He has been working on his voice with an opera singer for over a decade. His vocals have been described as "haunting", "deeply soulful", "heart-wrenching", "breathtaking", the timbre of his voice as "silky", "recognizable".

His songwriting style is narrative, following themes of self-love, lust, confusion, attachment, heartache, moving on from the past, or loneliness. Composing all of his songs on the piano, he considers the songwriting process a therapeutic tool and "medicine" for a broken heart.

=== Influences ===
Adonxs grew up listening to Queen, Depeche Mode, Elton John, Seal, Prince, and has cited Aurora, Sevdaliza, Josef Salvat, Sufjan Stevens, London Grammar, Lorde, Dua Lipa, Birdy, Florence + the Machine as some of his musical influences, while mentioning Woodkid as the key inspiration in his career beginnings.

=== Performance style ===
Elle dubbed Adonxs "the queer king", while Musicserver compared him to James Blake and Woodkid. He has garnered attention for his fashion style, widely described by media outlets as "eccentric". In an interview with Esquire, Adonxs defined his style as "London queer pop culture influenced". He described his trademark androgynous silhouette as having "broad shoulders, high waist, and legs for days", and has cited Damiano David, Sevdaliza, Prince, Freddie Mercury, and David Bowie as some of his influences in onstage fashion. He is known for his pre-show rituals such as painting his nails for good luck.

== Personal life ==
His sister Radka is an actress and singer based in Prague, Czechia. His mother is visual artist Monika Sabo and his stepfather CPT Marián Sabo is a paramedic. He is estranged from his biological father.

Adonxs is a fan of RuPaul's Drag Race.

He lives in Prague.

Adorerxs is the official name of the fandom and loyal fans of Adonxs.

== Discography ==
=== Studio albums ===
| Title | Details | Peak chart positions |
| Title | Details | SVK |
|---|---|---|
| Keeper | Released: 31 January 2018; Label: AIC; Format: CD, digital download, streaming | — |
| SuperStar 2021 | Released: 14 January 2021; Label: Warner; Format: CD, digital download, streaming | — |
| Age of Adonxs | Released: 11 November 2022; Label: Warner; Format: CD, LP, digital download, streaming | 88 |
| Death of a Pop Star | Release date: 30 October 2026; Label: Warner; Format: Digital download, streaming | — |
"—" denotes an album that did not chart or was not released in that territory.

=== Extended plays ===
| Title | Details |
|---|---|
| Acoustic Sessions | Released: 2 May 2025; Label: Warner; Format: Digital download, streaming |
| 31 | Released: 30 October 2026; Label: Warner; Format: Digital download, streaming |

=== Singles ===
==== As lead artist ====
| Title | Year | Peak chart positions | | | Album or EP |
| Title | Year | SVK Air. | CZE Air. | LTU | Album or EP |
|---|---|---|---|---|---|
| "Moving On" | 2022 | 31 | 15 | — | Age of Adonxs |
| "Game" | 2022 | 9 | 74 | — | Age of Adonxs |
| "Cold Summer" | 2022 | — (Note: "Cold Summer" did not enter the Rádio – Top 100 chart, but peaked at number 28 on the Slovak Local Rádio Top 50 chart.) | — | — | Age of Adonxs |
| "No Common Measure" | 2023 | 37 | 20 | — | Non-album single |
| "Overthinkr" | 2023 | — | — | — | Age of Adonxs |
| "Sám" | 2024 | 28 | — | — | 31 |
| "Intergalactic Rodeo" | 2024 | 63 | — | — | Non-album single |
| "Kiss Kiss Goodbye" | 2025 | 34 | — | 92 | Death of a Pop Star |
| "Wasted" | 2025 | — (Note: "Wasted" did not enter the Rádio – Top 100 chart, but peaked at number 40 on the Slovak Local Rádio Top 50 chart.) | — | — | Death of a Pop Star |
| "Perfume" | 2025 | — (Note: "Perfume" did not enter the Rádio – Top 100 chart, but peaked at number 28 on the Slovak Local Rádio Top 50 chart.) | 9 | — | Death of a Pop Star |
| "Rituál" (with Emma Drobná) | 2026 | 9 | — | — | 31 |
| "Cherry on Your Cake" | 2026 | 20 | 18 | — | Death of a Pop Star |
"—" denotes a recording that did not chart or was not released in that territory.

==== As part of Pace ====
| Title | Year | Album or EP |
|---|---|---|
| "Hunt Me Down" | 2019 | Non-album singles |
| "Fallen" | 2020 | Non-album singles |

== Filmography ==
=== Music videos ===
| Year | Title | Role | Artist |
|---|---|---|---|
| 2019 | "24/7" | man | MELINA |
| 2021 | "The Riddle" | man | Silly Boy Blue |
| 2021 | "Euphoria" | main character | NobodyListen |

=== Television ===
| Year | Title | Episode |
|---|---|---|
| 2012 | The Voice Česko Slovensko | series 1, episode 2, 6 |
| 2021 | SuperStar | series 7, episode 5, 8, 12 – 16 |
| 2022 | Snídaně s Novou | episode 20. 12. |
| 2022 | Teleráno | episode 21. 12. |
| 2022 | TALK! | episode 11. 1. |
| 2022 | Reflex | episode 16. 2. |
| 2022 | Chart Show | series 7, episode 6 |
| 2022 | Krištáľové krídlo | 25th edition |
| 2022 | Život ve hvězdách | episode 30. 4. |
| 2022 | Let's Dance | series 7, episode 8 |
| 2022 | Neskoro večer | episode 28. 5. |
| 2022 | Social Awards Slovakia | 3rd edition |
| 2022 | Tvoja tvár znie povedome | 7th series |

== Tours ==
Headlining

- Adonxs On Tour (2022)

== Awards and nominations ==
| Year | Award | Category | Work | Result | Ref. |
|---|---|---|---|---|---|
| 2021 | Ruka Hore Awards | Best New Artist | Himself | Runner-up | |
| 2022 | Forbes 30 Under 30 | Music | Himself | Included | |
| 2022 | Social Awards Slovakia | Social Award for Music | Himself | Runner-up | |
| 2022 | Evropa 2 Music Awards | Best Male Artist | Himself | Won | |
| 2022 | Evropa 2 Music Awards | Best New Artist | Himself | Won | |
| 2022 | Evropa 2 Music Awards | Song of the Year | "Moving On" | Runner-up | |
| 2022 | Anděl Awards | Best Slovak Album | Age of Adonxs | Nominated | |
| 2022 | Cena inakosti | Recognition for LGBTQ+ activism | Himself | Won | |
| 2022 | Ruka Hore Awards | Artist of the Year | Himself | Nominated | |
| 2022 | Ruka Hore Awards | Album of the Year | Age of Adonxs | Nominated | |
| 2022 | Ruka Hore Awards | Evropa 2 Song of the Year | "Game" | Won | |
| 2024 | Crystal Wing Awards | Award for Pop Music | Himself | Nominated | |
| 2024 | Berlin Music Video Awards | Best Performer | Himself | Second place | |
| 2025 | Berlin Music Video Awards | Best Performer | "Kiss Kiss Goodbye" | Nominated | |
| 2025 | Eurovision Awards | Non-Qualifying Show-Stopper | | Nominated | |

== Dancing results ==
=== Slovak Championship ===
| Season | Age division | IDO Street Dance discipline | Place |
|---|---|---|---|
| 2005 | C | Disco Dance formation | 2 |
| 2006 | C | Disco Dance solo male | 3 |
| 2006 | C | Disco Dance formation | 2 |
| 2007 | J | Disco Dance formation | 1 |
| 2007 | J | Disco Dance formation | 1 |
| 2009 | J | Disco Dance duo | 2 |
| 2009 | A1 | Disco Dance group | 1 |
| 2010 | A1 | Disco Dance group | 1 |
| 2010 | A1 | Disco Dance formation | 1 |
| 2010 | A1 | Street Dance Show group | 2 |

=== World Championship ===
| Season | Age division | IDO Street Dance discipline | Place |
|---|---|---|---|
| 2005 | C | Disco Dance formation | 3 |

=== Slovak Cup ===
| Season | Age division | IDO Street Dance discipline | Place |
|---|---|---|---|
| 2007 | J | Disco Dance solo male | 1 |
| 2008 | J | Disco Dance solo male | 2 |
| 2009 | J | Disco Dance duo | 3 |

- J = junior
- A = adult

== See also ==
- List of Idols winners

== Notes ==
Awards and achievements
| Preceded by Aiko with "Pedestal" | Czech Republic in the Eurovision Song Contest; 2025 | Succeeded by Daniel Zizka with "Crossroads" |
