= Radka Pavlovčinová =

Slovak actress

- Born: 1 February 1989 (age 36); Senica, Czechoslovakia
- Education: Jaroslav Ježek Conservatory
- Occupations: Actress; singer; dancer
- Years active: 2006–present
- Known for: Robin Hood
- Relatives: Adonxs (brother)

Radka Pavlovčinová (Czech: [ˈratka ˈpavloftʃɪnovaː], Slovak: [ˈratka ˈpaʋlɔwtʂinɔʋaː]; born 1 February 1989) is a Slovak actress, singer and television presenter. She received two nominations for the Thalia Award for her performance in Robin Hood in 2010, as well as in Bratři naděje in 2022.

== Early life ==
Radka Pavlovčinová was born on 1 February 1989, in Senica, Czechoslovakia (now Slovakia). She was introduced to performing arts in early childhood and began dancing at 3. At the age of nine, she became the world champion in IDO's disco dance disciplines. When she was fifteen years old, she moved to Prague, Czech Republic, where she graduated from the Jaroslav Ježek Conservatory. She did not return to Slovakia and choose to pursue an acting career in the Czech Republic.

== Career ==
=== Acting ===
Pavlovčinová has never pursued an acting career in her native country. In the Czech Republic, she has been praised for speaking Czech without a Slovak accent, a significant advantage over other Slovak actresses working in the Czech film industry.

She made her film debut as a teenager in 2006 in the role of Karla in the comedy film Rafťáci, followed by a role in the television series Ulice and a role in the film Kdo hledá, najde.

She landed her first leading role as a ballerina in the series The First Step, making use of her experience as a professional dancer. Since then, she has starred in numerous television series such as Cesty domů, Lajna, Hvězdy nad hlavou, as well as in the American comedy series Miracle Workers, starring Daniel Radcliffe and Steve Buscemi. In 2019, she starred in the romantic comedy film Přes prsty.

As a theatre actress, she has been involved with Háta Theater, Minor Theater, or Kalich Theater.

In 2010, she portrayed a ballerina in Kanye West's 35-minute-long musical film Runaway. In 2011, Pavlovčinová received her first Thalia Award nomination for her portrayal of the witch in Robin Hood. In the same year, she portrayed Esmeralda in Quasimodo.

In 2021, she starred in the comedy plays Pouic Pouic and Cactus Flower. In September 2022, she received her second nomination for the Thalia Award for her performance in Bratři naděje. In 2023, she portrayed the lover in LP’s music video for "One Like You". In 2024, she appeared with her brother Adonxs on RTVS’s Milujem Slovensko.

=== Television ===
In 2024, Pavlovčinová became a television presenter on OK TV.

=== Music ===
Apart from her acting career, she is the lead singer of the funk group Drama Queens, performing with Dušan Marek, musician and former lead singer of the Czech rock band Support Lesbiens. She performed with the Cuban salsa band Caribe in the past.

Since June 2022, he has toured with singer Ewa Farna as both a dancer and vocalist.

=== Activism ===
Pavlovčinová is a co-founder of Kulturní sféra (Cultural Sphere), an organization that aims to help artists and other professionals in the performing arts industry who have struggled financially following the COVID-19 pandemic restrictions. On their behalf, she successfully negotiated with the Czech Ministry of Culture and the Ministry of Finance to implement legislative changes in the financial assistance programs introduced by the government.

She has been involved with UNICEF in providing humanitarian aid for war refugees amid Russia's invasion of Ukraine, a neighboring country of her native Slovakia.

== Personal life ==
Pavlovčinová practices yoga and meditation and is known for leading a healthy lifestyle. She has a tattoo on her face next to her left eye. Her brother, who is six years younger, is singer, dancer and model Adonxs. Her mother is the critically acclaimed visual artist Monika Sabo. She does not keep in touch with her biological father.

She resides in Prague, Czech Republic.

== Filmography ==
Year	Title	Role
2006	Rafťáci	Karla
2006	Ulice	ballerina
2007	Kto hledá, najde	
2009	První krok	
2010	Runway	ballerina
2010	Cesty domů	drug addict Monika
2014	PříBěh	
2018	Kája+Mat+Ema+Tika 1	
2018	Tátové na tahu	
2019	Přes prsty	
2019	Miracle Workers	
2020	Kája+Mat+Ema+Tika 2	
2021	Co ste hasiči	
2021	Hvězdy nad hlavou	
2021	Lajna	

=== Music videos ===
Year	Title	Role	Artist
2010	"Runway"	ballerina	Kanye West
2014	"Adam Reborn"	snake	Stroy
2023	"One Like You"	lover	LP
