= Overthinking (disambiguation) =

Overthinking refers to thinking about a situation or topic to an excessive amount or, in a simpler way, to think about (something) too much or for too long.

Overthinking may also refer to:

- Overthinking with Kat & June, 2018 web series
- Overthinking, 2018 EP by Shy Martin
- "Overthinking", song by Hands Like Houses from Anon
- "Overthinking", song by Mabel from About Last Night..., 2022
- "Over Thinker", song by Relient K from Two Lefts Don't Make a Right...but Three Do
- "Overthinker", song by Adonxs from Age of Adonxs, 2022
