= Red band (disambiguation) =

Red band is a rating card in the Motion Picture Association film rating system.

Red band or Red Band may also refer to:

- Red (band), American Christian rock band
- Red Band, Israeli puppetry comedy musical band
- a brand of Cloetta, Swedish confectionery company

== See also ==
- Red Band Society
