= Daniel Žižka =

Czech musical artist (born 2003)

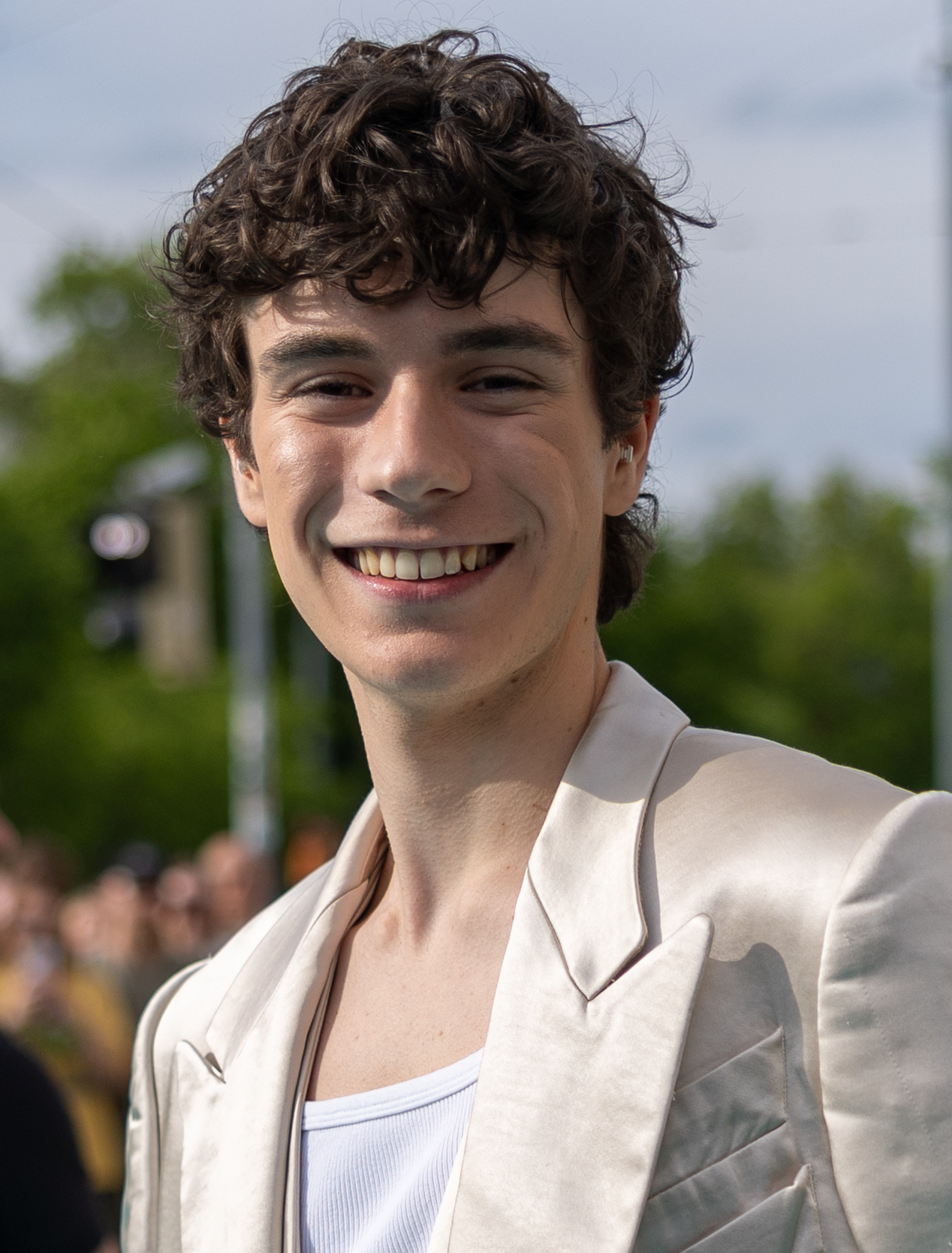
- Žižka in 2026

Background information
- Also known as: Daniell (2019-2023)
- Born: 20 January 2003 (age 23); Prague, Czech Republic
- Genres: Indie pop, pop
- Occupations: Singer; songwriter; actor
- Instrument: Vocals
- Years active: 2019–present

Daniel Žižka (born 20 January 2003) is a Czech singer-songwriter and actor. He represented the Czech Republic in the Eurovision Song Contest 2026 with the song "Crossroads".

== Early life ==
Žižka was born on 20 January 2003 in Prague. Since the age of 10, he has been writing songs and he has commented that "I decided I wanted to pursue music professionally when I was about fifteen, after I wrote my first song — once I was satisfied enough with it to have it professionally recorded... I've been writing songs since I was 10, though. I've always known I wanted to be an artist, and around sixth grade, I decided I wanted to study at the Jaroslav Ježek Conservatory. But I was also drawn to theater, and I wondered how I would manage it. In the end, I decided to combine the two and study musical theatre."

Since the age of 15, he has been undergoing vocal training and he participates in daily lessons to maintain his voice and in January 2026, he was studying popular singing and composition at the J. Ježek Conservatory in Prague.

== Career ==
Žižka's indie pop and pop/soul debut EP is due to be released towards the end of August 2026 with singles to be released in the lead up to the EP being released. The EP was also performed live for the first time in Prague, in January 2026.

Žižka has also acted in various roles on television, like Jakub Ledvina in Taneční, and has worked as a vocal coach.

=== Eurovision ===
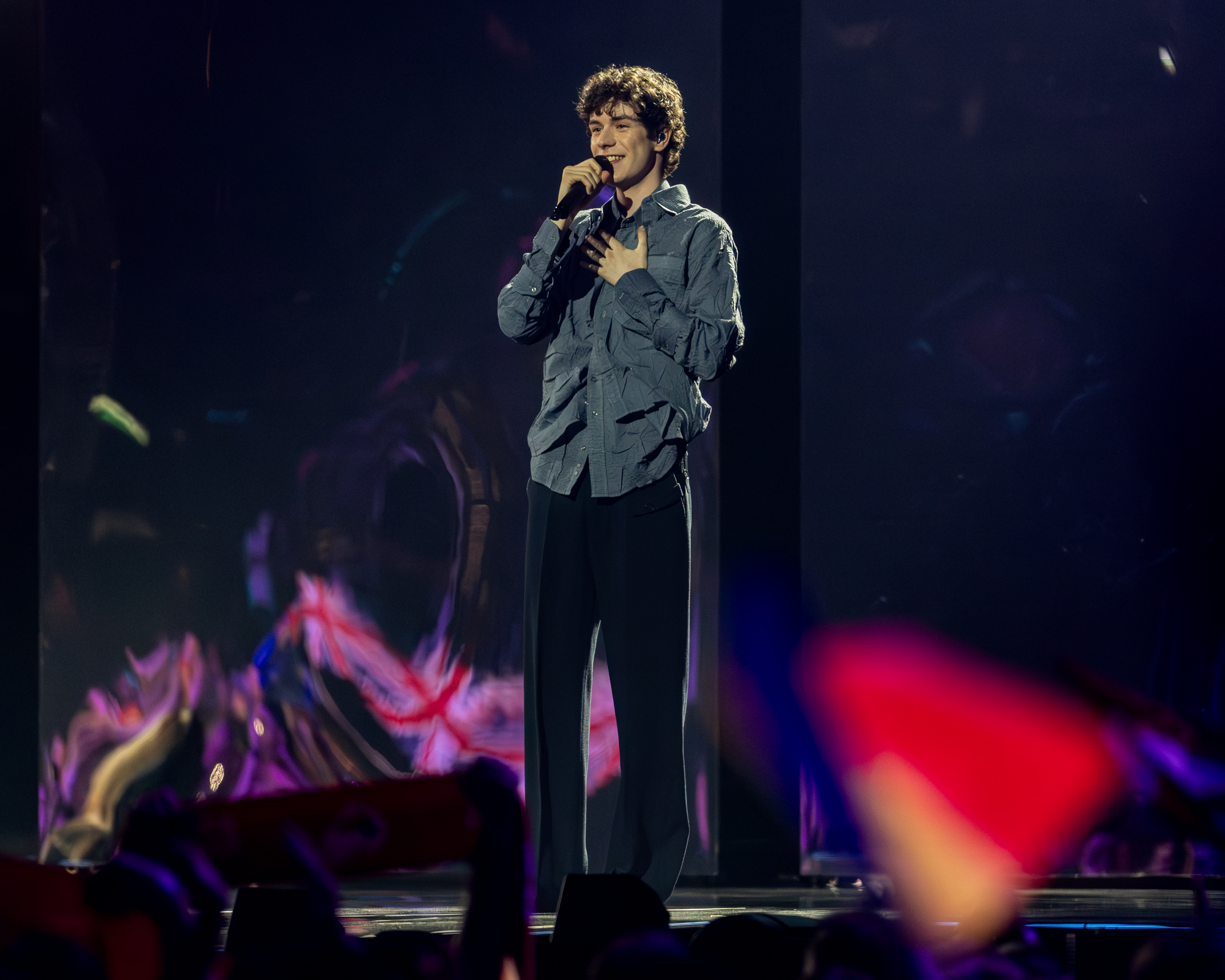
Žižka at the Eurovision 2026 Second Semi-Final in Vienna

On 11 March 2026, Žižka was announced as the Czech representative for the Eurovision Song Contest 2026 with the song "Crossroads" and the song was released along with a music video. The selection of Žižka and the song, written together with Viliam Béreš, was determined by the combination of votes from an international jury of music professionals from three countries following an audition round at the Czech Television studios. The songwriting process for "Crossroads" took approximately a year and a half and after this period it took a further six months to produce the song.

"Crossroads" explores the idea of what happens when a person is standing "...at an imaginary crossroads and must choose a further path"; this theme is reflected in the stage performance which builds on ideas of reflection, illusion, and fragmentation. The staging is directed by Ruy Okamura, who also directed the music video for "Crossroads", and it includes four large movable mirror panels which create constantly changing perspectives on stage, symbolising the different paths and possible outcomes of one's decisions. The repeated reflections of the singer further emphasise the song's introspective atmosphere and the uncertainty tied to moments of choice. When asked "What are you seeing in these mirrors?" Žižka responded, "a lot of... choices, many possible realities, maybe something that can feel overwhelming. You don't know which way to go, many options in life".

After participating in the second semi-final on 14 May 2026, he qualified for the final on 16 May. At the end of the final, he placed 16th out of 25 participants, with 113 points: 104 points from the juries and 9 from the televoting. His performance in the final was affected by several technical issues: and although the Czech delegation submitted a request to perform again, they were denied to do so.

== Discography ==
Credits taken from Apple Music.

=== Extended plays ===
List of studio albums, with selected details
Title	Details
Chaos	Release date: 20 November 2026; Label: Self-released; Formats: Digital download, streaming

=== Singles ===
Title	Year	Album
"Wrong"	2019	Non-album singles
"Go On"	2020	Non-album singles
"Airplane"	2020	Non-album singles
"Aim"	2021	Non-album singles
"Pierrot" (with Barbora Mochowa)	2023	Non-album singles
"Talk"	2024	Non-album singles
"23:23"	2025	Chaos
"Never Felt Like Less"	2025	Chaos
"Crossroads"	2026	Chaos
"Since We've Changed"	2026	Chaos

Awards and achievements
Preceded by Adonxs with "Kiss Kiss Goodbye"	Czech Republic in the Eurovision Song Contest; 2026	Succeeded by TBD
