= Czech Republic in the Eurovision Song Contest 2025 =

- Eurovision Song Contest 2025
- Participating broadcaster: Czech Television (ČT)
- Country: Czech Republic
- Selection process: Internal selection
- Announcement date: Artist: 11 December 2024; Song: 7 March 2025

Competing entry
- Song: "Kiss Kiss Goodbye"
- Artist: Adonxs
- Songwriters: Adam Pavlovčin; Adriano Lopes da Silva; George Masters-Clark; Inés Coulon; Lorenzo Calvo; Michaela Charvátová; Ronald Janeček

Placement
- Semi-final result: Failed to qualify (12th)

Participation chronology

The Czech Republic, presented as Czechia, was represented at the Eurovision Song Contest 2025 with the song "Kiss Kiss Goodbye", written by Adam Pavlovčin, Adriano Lopes da Silva, George Masters-Clark, Inés Coulon, Lorenzo Calvo, Michaela Charvátová, and Ronald Janeček, and performed by Pavlovčin under his stage name Adonxs. The Czech participating broadcaster, Czech Television (ČT), internally selected its entry for the contest.

Czechia was drawn to compete in the second semi-final of the Eurovision Song Contest which took place on 15 May 2025. Performing during the show in position 12, "Kiss Kiss Goodbye" was not announced among the top 10 entries of the second semi-final and therefore did not qualify to compete in the final. It was later revealed that Czechia placed 12th out of the 16 participating countries in the semi-final, with 29 points.

== Background ==
Prior to the 2025 contest, Czech Television (ČT) had participated in the Eurovision Song Contest representing the Czech Republic, presented as Czechia since 2023, twelve times since its first entry in 2007. Its best result in the contest was sixth, achieved in 2018 with the song "Lie to Me" performed by Mikolas Josef. It competed in the contest on three consecutive occasions between 2007 and 2009 without qualifying to the final, after which ČT withdrew between 2010 and 2014, citing low viewing figures and poor results as reasons for its absence. Since returning to the contest in 2015, the Czech Republic has thus far managed to qualify for the final on five occasions. In 2024, "Pedestal" performed by Aiko failed to qualify for the final.

As part of its duties as participating broadcaster, ČT organises the selection of its entry in the Eurovision Song Contest and broadcasts the event in the country. The broadcaster had used both national finals and internal selections to select its entries in the past. Between 2018 and 2024, with the exception of 2021 when the entry was internally selected, it had used the national final format ESCZ (formerly titled Eurovision Song CZ) as its selection method for the contest. On 6 September 2024, ČT confirmed its intention to participate in the 2025 contest; plans regarding the selection were announced on 9 September 2024, with its entry to be selected internally.

== Before Eurovision ==
=== Internal selection ===
Upon confirming its participation in the contest on 6 September 2024, ČT opened a submission window for interested artists and composers lasting until 30 September 2024. At least one of the performers was required to be based in the Czech Republic for an entry to qualify to compete, while songwriters could be of any nationality; for the first time, applying composers were not required to indicate a performer for their song, who would be selected afterwards.

On 11 December 2024, ČT announced that Slovak singer Adam Pavlovčin, under the stage name Adonxs, would represent Czechia in Basel, while the song "Kiss Kiss Goodbye" was announced as the Czech entry on 31 January 2025. Adonxs and the song were selected in various rounds by a ten-member international jury consisting of music professionals and former Eurovision entrants, a demoscopic jury consisting of 900 members from three countries, and a focus group. An acoustic version of the song was presented to the public on 4 February 2025 during the first semi-final of the 2025 Maltese national final, while its studio cut was released on 7 March alongside an accompanying music video.

== At Eurovision ==
The Eurovision Song Contest 2025 will take place at St. Jakobshalle in Basel, Switzerland, and will consist of two semi-finals to be held on the respective dates of 13 and 15 May and the final on 17 May 2025. During the allocation draw held on 28 January 2025, the Czech Republic was drawn to compete in the second semi-final, performing in the second half of the show. Adonxs was later drawn to perform 12th, after Denmark's Sissal and before Luxembourg's Laura Thorn. Adonxs did not make it through to the final.

=== Voting ===
==== Points awarded to Czechia ====
Points awarded to Czechia (Semi-final 2)
| Points | Televote |
|---|---|
| 12 points | |
| 10 points | |
| 8 points | Rest of the World |
| 7 points | |
| 6 points | |
| 5 points | Armenia; Austria; Luxembourg |
| 4 points | |
| 3 points | Georgia; Israel |
| 2 points | |
| 1 point | |

==== Points awarded by Czechia ====
Points awarded by Czechia (Semi-final 2)
| Points | Televote |
|---|---|
| 12 points | Israel |
| 10 points | Latvia |
| 8 points | Lithuania |
| 7 points | Finland |
| 6 points | Austria |
| 5 points | Denmark |
| 4 points | Greece |
| 3 points | Armenia |
| 2 points | Malta |
| 1 point | Australia |

Points awarded by Czechia (Final)
| Points | Televote | Jury |
|---|---|---|
| 12 points | Ukraine | Germany |
| 10 points | Israel | United Kingdom |
| 8 points | Poland | France |
| 7 points | Sweden | Netherlands |
| 6 points | Estonia | Norway |
| 5 points | Albania | Lithuania |
| 4 points | Austria | Portugal |
| 3 points | Finland | Italy |
| 2 points | Norway | Malta |
| 1 point | Germany | Denmark |

==== Detailed voting results ====
Each participating broadcaster assembles a five-member jury panel consisting of music industry professionals who are citizens of the country they represent. Each jury, and individual jury member, is required to meet a strict set of criteria regarding professional background, as well as diversity in gender and age. No member of a national jury was permitted to be related in any way to any of the competing acts in such a way that they cannot vote impartially and independently. The individual rankings of each jury member as well as the nation's televoting results were released shortly after the grand final.

The following members comprised the Czech jury:

- Adam Řičica
- Miroslav Helcl
- Petr Kotvald
- Alexandra Langošová
- Anna Vašátková

Detailed voting results from Czechia (Semi-final 2)
| R/O | Country | Televote | |
| R/O | Country | Rank | Points |
|---|---|---|---|
| 01 | Australia | 10 | 1 |
| 02 | Montenegro | 13 | |
| 03 | Ireland | 12 | |
| 04 | Latvia | 2 | 10 |
| 05 | Armenia | 8 | 3 |
| 06 | Austria | 5 | 6 |
| 07 | Greece | 7 | 4 |
| 08 | Lithuania | 3 | 8 |
| 09 | Malta | 9 | 2 |
| 10 | Georgia | 15 | |
| 11 | Denmark | 6 | 5 |
| 12 | Czechia | | |
| 13 | Luxembourg | 11 | |
| 14 | Israel | 1 | 12 |
| 15 | Serbia | 14 | |
| 16 | Finland | 4 | 7 |

Detailed voting results from Czechia (Final)
| R/O | Country | Jury | | | | | | | Televote | |
| R/O | Country | Juror A | Juror B | Juror C | Juror D | Juror E | Rank | Points | Rank | Points |
|---|---|---|---|---|---|---|---|---|---|---|
| 01 | Norway | 21 | 17 | 17 | 1 | 2 | 5 | 6 | 9 | 2 |
| 02 | Luxembourg | 16 | 9 | 15 | 9 | 17 | 19 | | 23 | |
| 03 | Estonia | 14 | 15 | 8 | 17 | 8 | 18 | | 5 | 6 |
| 04 | Israel | 11 | 13 | 14 | 12 | 4 | 14 | | 2 | 10 |
| 05 | Lithuania | 3 | 12 | 4 | 11 | 6 | 6 | 5 | 14 | |
| 06 | Spain | 22 | 11 | 20 | 10 | 18 | 21 | | 21 | |
| 07 | Ukraine | 19 | 22 | 21 | 19 | 19 | 23 | | 1 | 12 |
| 08 | United Kingdom | 1 | 10 | 3 | 13 | 5 | 2 | 10 | 26 | |
| 09 | Austria | 13 | 18 | 25 | 24 | 14 | 22 | | 7 | 4 |
| 10 | Iceland | 23 | 24 | 23 | 6 | 23 | 20 | | 12 | |
| 11 | Latvia | 4 | 8 | 6 | 23 | 21 | 11 | | 13 | |
| 12 | Netherlands | 20 | 1 | 10 | 2 | 22 | 4 | 7 | 18 | |
| 13 | Finland | 10 | 23 | 9 | 7 | 20 | 17 | | 8 | 3 |
| 14 | Italy | 2 | 14 | 5 | 14 | 13 | 8 | 3 | 15 | |
| 15 | Poland | 25 | 19 | 24 | 16 | 24 | 24 | | 3 | 8 |
| 16 | Germany | 5 | 20 | 1 | 3 | 7 | 1 | 12 | 10 | 1 |
| 17 | Greece | 17 | 5 | 18 | 15 | 11 | 16 | | 11 | |
| 18 | Armenia | 18 | 2 | 19 | 25 | 12 | 13 | | 16 | |
| 19 | Switzerland | 8 | 4 | 7 | 22 | 15 | 12 | | 20 | |
| 20 | Malta | 9 | 7 | 16 | 5 | 9 | 9 | 2 | 19 | |
| 21 | Portugal | 6 | 6 | 2 | 20 | 10 | 7 | 4 | 25 | |
| 22 | Denmark | 12 | 26 | 13 | 18 | 1 | 10 | 1 | 22 | |
| 23 | Sweden | 15 | 21 | 11 | 4 | 16 | 15 | | 4 | 7 |
| 24 | France | 7 | 3 | 12 | 8 | 3 | 3 | 8 | 17 | |
| 25 | San Marino | 26 | 25 | 26 | 26 | 26 | 26 | | 24 | |
| 26 | Albania | 24 | 16 | 22 | 21 | 25 | 25 | | 6 | 5 |
