= Israel in the Eurovision Song Contest 2025 =

- Eurovision Song Contest 2025
- Participating broadcaster: Israeli Public Broadcasting Corporation (IPBC/Kan)
- Country: Israel
- Selection process: Artist: HaKokhav HaBa L'Eirovizion; Song: Internal selection
- Selection date: Artist: 22 January 2025; Song: 9 March 2025

Competing entry
- Song: "New Day Will Rise"
- Artist: Yuval Raphael
- Songwriter: Keren Peles

Placement
- Semi-final result: Qualified (1st, 203 points)
- Final result: 2nd, 357 points

Participation chronology

Israel was represented at the Eurovision Song Contest 2025 with the song "New Day Will Rise", written by Keren Peles and performed by Yuval Raphael. The Israeli participating broadcaster, the Israeli Public Broadcasting Corporation (IPBC/Kan), selected Raphael as its representative through the show HaKokhav HaBa L'Eirovizion, in collaboration with commercial broadcaster Keshet and Tedy Productions, while the song "New Day Will Rise" was chosen internally. As with the previous year, Israel's participation was the subject of controversy due to the Gaza war.

Israel was drawn to compete in the second semi-final of the Eurovision Song Contest which took place on 15 May 2025. Performing during the show in position 14, Israel was announced among the top 10 entries of the second semi-final and therefore qualified to compete in the final on 17 May. It was later revealed that Israel placed first out of the 16 participating countries in the semi-final with 203 points. In the final, Israel performed in position 4 and placed second out of the 26 participating countries, scoring 357 points.

== Background ==
Prior to the 2025 contest, the Israel Broadcasting Authority (IBA) until 2017, and the Israeli Public Broadcasting Corporation (IPBC/Kan) since 2018, had participated in the Eurovision Song Contest representing Israel forty-six times since the IBA's first entry in 1973. They had won the contest on four occasions: in 1978 with the song "A-Ba-Ni-Bi" by Izhar Cohen and the Alphabeta, in 1979 with the song "Hallelujah" by Milk and Honey, in 1998 with the song "Diva" by Dana International, and in 2018 with the song "Toy" by Netta. Since the introduction of semi-finals in 2004, they had, to this point, managed to qualify to the final 13 times, achieving, besides its 2018 victory, five top ten results, most recently in 2024 with "Hurricane" by Eden Golan placing fifth.

As part of its duties as participating broadcaster, Kan selects an entry to represent Israel in the Eurovision Song Contest and broadcasts the event in the country. Kan confirmed its intention to participate in the 2025 contest on 31 May 2024, announcing on 23 July that its representative would continue to be selected through the reality singing competition HaKokhav HaBa (Rising Star).

== Before Eurovision ==
=== HaKokhav HaBa L'Eirovizion ===
The artist who would represent Israel in the Eurovision Song Contest 2025 was selected through the reality singing competition HaKokhav HaBa L'Eirovizion (transl. The Next Star for Eurovision), produced by Tedy Productions and Keshet Media Group, and broadcast on Keshet 12 as well as online via mako.co.il. The shows took place at the Neve Ilan Communications Center in Neve Ilan, and were hosted by Assi Azar and Rotem Sela. The judging panel for the competition was composed of Assaf Amdursky, Keren Peles, Shiri Maimon (who represented Israel in 2005), Ran Danker, Itay Levi and Eden Hason. Nasrin Kadri and Static joined as guest judges.

Preliminary casting rounds began in late July 2024 and ended in early October. Qualifiers from the preliminary casting phase proceeded to the auditions proper, which began filming on 10 October.

==== Auditions ====
Candidates were required to get a score of at least 70% of the votes from the judges and the studio audience in order to advance.

Audition 1 – 10 November 2024
R/O	Artist	Song	Jury votes						Score	Result
R/O	Artist	Song	A. A.	E. H.	K. P.	I. L.	R. D.	S. M.	Score	Result
1	Nati Livian	"I Wanna Dance with Somebody (Who Loves Me)"	Yes	Yes	Yes	Yes	Yes	Yes	93%	Advanced
2	Kler	"Love on the Brain"	Yes	Yes	Yes	Yes	Yes	Yes	96%	Advanced
3	Renana Boaziza	"Nigmar"	No	Yes	Yes	Yes	Yes	Yes (Note: Maimon was absent during this performance, so Ness and Stilla voted in her place.)	82%	Advanced
4	Tali Kuper	"Lose Control"	No	Yes	Yes	Yes	No	Yes	66%	Eliminated
5	Ido Malka	"Psikhopat" (Note: Original song)	Yes	Yes	Yes	Yes	Yes	Yes	94%	Advanced
6	Daniel Wais	"Ani Gitara"	Yes	Yes	Yes	Yes	Yes	Yes	97%	Advanced

Audition 2 – 16 November 2024
R/O	Artist	Song	Jury votes						Score	Result
R/O	Artist	Song	A. A.	E. H.	K. P.	I. L.	R. D.	S. M.	Score	Result
1	Perfylove Mongoza	"Drivers License"	Yes	Yes	Yes	Yes	Yes	Yes	92%	Advanced
2	Ilay Katz	"Aba"	No	Yes	Yes	Yes	Yes	Yes	86%	Advanced
3	Nelly Mira Rubin	"(You Make Me Feel Like) A Natural Woman"	Yes	No	Yes	Yes	No	No	62%	Eliminated
4	Hili Goren	"Im Mechar Ani Met"	Yes	Yes	Yes	Yes	Yes	Yes	89%	Advanced
5	Ronen Binder	"Careless Whisper"	No	Yes	Yes	Yes	Yes	Yes	78%	Advanced
6	Alma Maimon de Razon	"October Sky"	Yes	Yes	Yes	Yes	Yes	Yes	94%	Advanced

Audition 3 – 17 November 2024
R/O	Artist	Song	Jury votes						Score	Result
R/O	Artist	Song	A. A.	E. H.	K. P.	I. L.	R. D.	S. M.	Score	Result
1	Aviad Klein	"When We Were Young"	Yes	Yes	Yes	Yes	Yes	Yes	96%	Advanced
2	Amit Sade	"Scars to Your Beautiful"	Yes	Yes	Yes	Yes	Yes	Yes	96%	Advanced
3	Mika Veltman	"Lose Control"	No	No	Yes	No	Yes	Yes	52%	Eliminated
4	Tamir Vaknin	"Ir Namel"	No	Yes	Yes	Yes	Yes	Yes	81%	Advanced
5	Red Band and Moran Aharoni	"Human"	No	Yes	Yes	Yes	Yes	Yes	82%	Advanced

Audition 4 – 19 November 2024
R/O	Artist	Song	Jury votes						Score	Result
R/O	Artist	Song	A. A.	E. H.	K. P.	I. L.	R. D.	S. M.	Score	Result
1	Dolev Mendelbaum	"Jealous"	Yes	Yes	Yes	Yes	Yes	Yes	85%	Advanced
2	Ester Guedj	"Voilà"	No	Yes	Yes	Yes	Yes	Yes	86%	Advanced
3	Nir Abdu	"Nishba"	No	Yes	Yes	Yes	Yes	Yes	80%	Advanced
4	Liel Yeshaya	"Tel Aviv BaLaila"	No	Yes	No	Yes	No	No	42%	Eliminated
5	Yuval Raphael	"Anyone"	Yes	Yes	Yes	Yes	Yes	Yes	98%	Advanced

Audition 5 – 23 November 2024
R/O	Artist	Song	Jury votes						Score	Result
R/O	Artist	Song	A. A.	E. H.	K. P.	I. L.	R. D.	S. M.	Score	Result
1	Elyakir Keren	"HaGorel HaZe"	Yes	Yes	Yes	Yes	Yes	Yes	95%	Advanced
2	Linoy Bismuth	"Mech Lech Yalda"	No	No	Yes	Yes	Yes	No	57%	Eliminated
3	Harel Cohen	"Lose Control"	No	Yes	Yes	Yes	Yes	Yes	87%	Advanced
4	Ori Saban	"Shiri Dikaon"	No	Yes	Yes	Yes	Yes	Yes	86%	Advanced
5	Ofir Harush	"Out Here on My Own"	Yes	Yes	Yes	Yes	No	No	74%	Advanced
6	Valerie Hamaty	"Roch Yam"	Yes	Yes	Yes	Yes	Yes	Yes	93%	Advanced

Audition 6 – 24 November 2024
R/O	Artist	Song	Jury votes						Score	Result
R/O	Artist	Song	A. A.	E. H.	K. P.	I. L.	R. D.	S. M.	Score	Result
1	Noam Chen	"Don't Look Back in Anger"	Yes	Yes	Yes	Yes	Yes	Yes	88%	Advanced
2	Niv Dagan	"When I Was Your Man"	No	Yes	Yes	Yes	Yes	Yes	86%	Advanced
3	Noa Lasri	"Homot Chimar"	No	Yes	Yes	Yes	Yes	Yes	84%	Advanced
4	Mandi Horvitz	"Bridge Over Troubled Water"	No	Yes	Yes	Yes	Yes	No	64%	Eliminated
5	Ester Aweke	"No One"	No	Yes	Yes	Yes	Yes	Yes	84%	Advanced
6	Yuval Gold	"HaYa Nechamed"	Yes	Yes	Yes	Yes	Yes	Yes	96%	Advanced

Audition 7 – 26 November 2024
R/O	Artist	Song	Jury votes						Score	Result
R/O	Artist	Song	A. A.	E. H.	K. P.	I. L.	R. D.	S. M.	Score	Result
1	Debbi James	"Ain't Nobody"	No	Yes	Yes	No	Yes	Yes	70%	Advanced
2	Udi Schneider	"Bad Romance"	Yes	Yes	Yes	Yes	Yes	Yes	88%	Advanced
3	Roy Elbaz	"BaPerek HaBa"	No	Yes	Yes	Yes	Yes	Yes	77%	Advanced
4	Yasmin Shimoni	"Hopelessly Devoted to You"	No	Yes	No	Yes	No	Yes	64%	Eliminated
5	Natalie Zafar	"HaYiti Lech"	Yes	Yes	Yes	Yes	Yes	Yes	94%	Advanced

Audition 8 – 30 November 2024
R/O	Artist	Song	Jury votes						Score	Result
R/O	Artist	Song	A. A.	E. H.	K. P.	I. L.	R. D.	S. M.	Score	Result
1	Noa Fineman	"Arcade"	No	Yes	Yes	Yes	No	Yes	72%	Advanced
2	Ido Amdor	"Stone Cold"	Yes	Yes	Yes	Yes	Yes	Yes	91%	Advanced
3	Shira Knopp	"Lo LePachad Klal"	Yes	No	No	Yes	Yes	Yes	64%	Saved
4	Roy Berger	"Cosmic Girl"	Yes	Yes	Yes	Yes	Yes	Yes	87%	Advanced
5	Natan Zarka	"ShuShanim Atzuvot"	No	Yes	Yes	No	Yes	Yes	69%	Eliminated
6	Hamsa	"Rakdi"	No	Yes	Yes	Yes	Yes	Yes	74%	Advanced

Audition 9 – 1 December 2024
R/O	Artist	Song	Jury votes						Score	Result
R/O	Artist	Song	A. A.	E. H.	K. P.	I. L.	R. D.	S. M.	Score	Result
1	Eliad Peretz	"Roch Yam"	Yes	Yes	Yes	Yes	Yes	Yes	86%	Advanced
2	Itay Paz	"Knocking on Heaven's Door"	Yes	Yes	Yes	Yes	No	Yes	79%	Advanced
3	Odel Partush	"Yom Acharon"	No	Yes	No	No	Yes	Yes	57%	Eliminated
4	Noa Danay	"Russian Roulette"	Yes	Yes	Yes	Yes	No	No	74%	Advanced
5	Shahaf Belash	"Shki'ot Adomot"	Yes	Yes	Yes	No	Yes	Yes	82%	Advanced
6	Noam Levy	"HaGula"	Yes	Yes	Yes	Yes	Yes	Yes	89%	Advanced

Audition 10 – 3 December 2024
R/O	Artist	Song	Jury votes						Score	Result
R/O	Artist	Song	A. A.	E. H.	K. P.	I. L.	R. D.	S. M.	Score	Result
1	Orel Dahari	"Gibur"	Yes	No	Yes	Yes	No	Yes	70%	Advanced
2	Milly Dor	"Wildflower"	No	No	No	No	Yes	Yes	56%	Eliminated
3	Harel Koresh	"Yom Rodef Yom"	Yes	Yes	Yes	Yes	Yes	No	81%	Advanced
4	Avichai Malka	"Lailot VeKlalot"	No	Yes	Yes	Yes	No	Yes	74%	Advanced
5	Lia Gerber	"Cuz I Love You"	No	Yes	No	Yes	Yes	Yes	70%	Advanced
6	Benny Elbaz	"Mon amour"	No	Yes	Yes	Yes	Yes	Yes	78%	Withdrew (Note: Elbaz announced his withdrawal from the competition on 13 December.)

Audition 11 – 7 December 2024
R/O	Artist	Song	Jury votes						Score	Result
R/O	Artist	Song	A. A.	E. H.	K. P.	I. L.	R. D.	S. M.	Score	Result
1	Hodaya Tarkin	"Ben Adam"	Yes	Yes	No	Yes	Yes	Yes	83%	Advanced
2	Leshem Sharvit	"Moledet"	Yes	Yes	Yes	No	Yes	Yes	84%	Advanced
3	Hadas Cohen	"Nothing's Gonna Change My Love for You"	No	Yes	Yes	Yes	Yes	Yes	84%	Advanced
4	Nadav Cohen	"HaVichor HaBeishan Al Psanter"	No	Yes	Yes	No	No	Yes	60%	Eliminated
5	Hili Meshayev	"One Night Only"	No	Yes	Yes	Yes	No	Yes	70%	Advanced
6	Ron Buchnik	"Shkufim"	Yes	Yes	Yes	Yes	Yes	Yes	95%	Advanced

Audition 12 – 8 December 2024
R/O	Artist	Song	Jury votes						Score	Result
R/O	Artist	Song	A. A.	E. H.	K. P.	I. L.	R. D.	S. M.	Score	Result
1	Agam David Chai	"As the World Caves In"	Yes	Yes	Yes	Yes	Yes	Yes	91%	Advanced
2	Ben Ganon	"Ve'at"	Yes	Yes	Yes	Yes	No	Yes	80%	Advanced
3	Tanya Lauren	"Another Love"	No	No	Yes	Yes	No	Yes	48%	Eliminated
4	Ran Peretz	"HaBalada L'Machachot"	Yes	Yes	Yes	Yes	Yes	Yes	81%	Advanced
5	Ofir Levy	"Baybi HaShir HaBa Mukdash Lech"	No	Yes	Yes	Yes	Yes	Yes	82%	Advanced
6	Roni Jorno	"Mon amour"	Yes	Yes	Yes	Yes	Yes	Yes	90%	Advanced

Audition 13 – 10 December 2024
R/O	Artist	Song	Jury votes						Score	Result
R/O	Artist	Song	A. A.	E. H.	K. P.	I. L.	R. D.	S. M.	Score	Result
1	Ilay Avidani	"Amsterdam"	No	Yes	Yes	Yes	Yes	Yes	85%	Advanced
2	Anna Timofei	"My Heart Will Go On"	No	No	Yes	Yes	No	—N/a	48%	Eliminated
3	Siel Zeituna	"Stone Cold"	No	Yes	Yes	Yes	Yes	Yes	76%	Advanced
4	Yarden Azulay	"Eifo Hait"	Yes	Yes	Yes	Yes	No	Yes	71%	Advanced
5	Ohav Givati	"Medabrim 'Alai"	Yes	Yes	Yes	Yes	No	Yes	74%	Advanced
6	Corinne Gamliel	"Einaim"	Yes	Yes	Yes	Yes	Yes	Yes	93%	Advanced

Audition 14 – 11 December 2024
R/O	Artist	Song	Jury votes						Score	Result
R/O	Artist	Song	A. A.	E. H.	K. P.	I. L.	R. D.	S. M.	Score	Result
1	David Abbo	"Lailot VeKlalot"	Yes	Yes	Yes	Yes	No	Yes	80%	Advanced
2	Achinoam Moyal	"Hi Tom"	No	Yes	Yes	Yes	Yes	Yes	82%	Advanced
3	Roy Cohen	"Ein Medina L'Ahava"	No	Yes	No	Yes	No	Yes	57%	Eliminated
4	Liel Eldadi	"Milim SheHayati Omer Rak Lech"	No	Yes	Yes	Yes	Yes	No	74%	Advanced
5	Daniel Malhi	"Lechzor Elav BaLaila"	Yes	Yes	Yes	No	Yes	Yes	78%	Advanced
6	Avichai Ohana	"Katavti Milim"	Yes	Yes	Yes	Yes	Yes	Yes	91%	Advanced

==== Shortlisting round ====
From the 66 advanced candidates, the judges picked 21 to proceed in a non-televised shortlisting round. Those candidates were: Kler, Yuval Raphael, Ori Saban, Ido Malka, Natalie Zafar, Renana Boaziza, Daniel Wais, Yuval Gold, Udi Schneider, Amit Sade, Alma Maimon de Razon, Dolev Mendelbaum, Valerie Hamaty, Hamsa, Nati Livian, Itay Paz, Perfylove Mongoza, Aviad Klein, Ilay Avidani, Shira Knopp, and Red Band and Moran Aharoni.

==== Top 21 round ====
In the top 21 round, the votes of the judges and an audience determine one or two contestants to be eliminated from each show. In each of the first three shows, the artist to be eliminated was the one getting the lowest overall score. In the fourth and fifth shows, the artists were coupled to perform duets, with the eliminee selected between the lowest scoring duo in the fifth show. In the sixth, seventh, fifteenth and sixteenth shows, the artists were paired in duels, with the winners directly qualifying to the next round; the judges then selected one or two eliminee per show among the others. In the eighth, ninth and tenth shows, each contestant performed a duet with a surprise guest artist. The lowest scoring contestant across both the eleventh and twelfth shows combined was eliminated. In the thirteenth and fourteenth shows, the judges decided which of the bottom two scoring contestants to be eliminated.

Top 21 round – Show 1 – 14 December 2024
R/O	Artist	Song	Jury votes						Score	Result
R/O	Artist	Song	A.A.	E.H.	K.P.	I.L.	R.D.	S.M.	Score	Result
1	Kler	"Valerie"	No	Yes	Yes	Yes	Yes	Yes	84%	Advanced
2	Yuval Raphael	"All I Ask"	Yes	Yes	Yes	Yes	Yes	Yes	95%	Advanced
3	Ori Saban	"LaTet VeLaKakhat"	No	Yes	Yes	Yes	No	Yes	71%	Advanced
4	Ido Malka	"This Love"	No	Yes	Yes	Yes	Yes	Yes	84%	Advanced
5	Natalie Zafar	"Mechaka"	Yes	Yes	No	Yes	Yes	Yes	78%	Advanced
6	Renana Boaziza	"Yekhafim"	No	No	No	Yes	No	Yes	46%	Eliminated
7	Daniel Wais	"Imagine"	Yes	Yes	Yes	Yes	Yes	Yes	94%	Advanced

Top 21 round – Show 2 – 15 December 2024
R/O	Artist	Song	Jury votes						Score	Result
R/O	Artist	Song	A.A.	E.H.	K.P.	I.L.	R.D.	S.M.	Score	Result
1	Yuval Gold	"Beautiful Things"	No	Yes	Yes	Yes	Yes	Yes	83%	Advanced
2	Amit Sade	"Unfaithful"	No	Yes	Yes	Yes	No	Yes	70%	Advanced
3	Udi Schneider	"Ela"	Yes	No	No	Yes	Yes	Yes	62%	Advanced
4	Alma Maimon de Razon	"Not Going Anywhere"	No	Yes	Yes	Yes	Yes	Yes	87%	Advanced
5	Hamsa	"Gibor Shel Ima"	No	Yes	Yes	No	No	No	53%	Eliminated
6	Dolev Mendelbaum	"Lovely"	No	Yes	Yes	Yes	Yes	Yes	87%	Advanced
7	Valerie Hamaty	"VeAni Kore Lech"	Yes	Yes	Yes	Yes	Yes	Yes	93%	Advanced

Top 21 round – Show 3 – 17 December 2024
R/O	Artist	Song	Jury votes						Score	Result
R/O	Artist	Song	A.A.	E.H.	K.P.	I.L.	R.D.	S.M.	Score	Result
1	Nati Livian	"Someone You Loved"	No	Yes	Yes	Yes	No	Yes	77%	Advanced
2	Perfylove Mongoza	"Lift Me Up"	Yes	Yes	Yes	No	Yes	Yes	84%	Advanced
3	Itay Paz	"Chom Yoli Ogost"	Yes	Yes	Yes	Yes	Yes	Yes	85%	Advanced
4	Aviad Klein	"Bruises"	Yes	Yes	Yes	Yes	No	Yes	77%	Advanced
5	Shira Knopp	"Eleanor Rigby"	Yes	Yes	Yes	Yes	No	Yes	70%	Eliminated
6	Ilay Avidani	"If I Ain't Got You"	No	Yes	Yes	Yes	No	Yes	76%	Advanced
7	Red Band and Moran Aharoni	"It's So Hard" (Note: English-language version of "HaIm LiHayot Bech Me'ohav")	Yes	Yes	Yes	Yes	Yes	Yes	93%	Advanced

Top 18 round – Show 4 – 21 December 2024
R/O	Artist	Song	Jury votes						Score	Result
R/O	Artist	Song	A.A.	E.H.	K.P.	I.L.	R.D.	S.M.	Score	Result
1	Kler	"Stay"	Yes	Yes	Yes	Yes	Yes	Yes	94%	Advanced
1	Nati Livian	"Stay"	Yes	Yes	Yes	Yes	Yes	Yes	94%	Advanced
2	Udi Schneider	"Ahava"	No	Yes	Yes	No	Yes	Yes	68%	Advanced
2	Yuval Gold	"Ahava"	No	Yes	Yes	No	Yes	Yes	68%	Advanced
3	Red Band and Moran Aharoni	"I See Red"	Yes	Yes	Yes	Yes	Yes	Yes	91%	Advanced
3	Amit Sade	"I See Red"	Yes	Yes	Yes	Yes	Yes	Yes	91%	Advanced
4	Ori Saban	"Simanei HaZman"	Yes	No	Yes	No	Yes	Yes	63%	Eliminated
4	Ilay Avidani	"Simanei HaZman"	Yes	No	Yes	No	Yes	Yes	63%	Saved
5	Valerie Hamaty	"Hurricane"	Yes	Yes	Yes	Yes	Yes	Yes	95%	Advanced
5	Daniel Wais	"Hurricane"	Yes	Yes	Yes	Yes	Yes	Yes	95%	Advanced

Top 18 round – Show 5 – 22 December 2024
R/O	Artist	Song	Jury votes						Score	Result
R/O	Artist	Song	A.A.	E.H.	K.P.	I.L.	R.D.	S.M.	Score	Result
1	Alma Maimon de Razon	"Please Please Please"	Yes	Yes	Yes	No	Yes	No	62%	Saved
1	Dolev Mendelbaum	"Please Please Please"	Yes	Yes	Yes	No	Yes	No	62%	Saved
2	Perfylove Mongoza	"Can't Help Falling in Love"	No	Yes	Yes	No	Yes	Yes	74%	Advanced
2	Itay Paz	"Can't Help Falling in Love"	No	Yes	Yes	No	Yes	Yes	74%	Advanced
3	Natalie Zafar	"You Are the Reason"	Yes	Yes	Yes	Yes	No	Yes	84%	Advanced
3	Aviad Klein	"You Are the Reason"	Yes	Yes	Yes	Yes	No	Yes	84%	Advanced
4	Yuval Raphael	"Die with a Smile"	Yes	No	Yes	Yes	Yes	Yes	83%	Advanced
4	Ido Malka	"Die with a Smile"	Yes	No	Yes	Yes	Yes	Yes	83%	Advanced

Top 17 round – Show 6 – 26 December 2024
Duel	R/O	Artist	Song	Jury votes						Score	Result
Duel	R/O	Artist	Song	A.A.	E.H.	K.P.	I.L.	R.D.	S.M.	Score	Result
I	1	Dolev Mendelbaum	"That's Life"	Yes	Yes	Yes	Yes	Yes	Yes	92%	Advanced
I	2	Ilay Avidani	"HaNani Kan"	No	Yes	Yes	Yes	Yes	Yes	84%	Saved
II	3	Kler	"Hurt"	Yes	No	Yes	Yes	Yes	No	72%	Eliminated
II	4	Ido Malka	"Shum Dvar Lo Yifga Bi"	No	Yes	Yes	Yes	Yes	Yes	77%	Advanced
III	5	Nati Livian	"Nothing's Gonna Change My Love for You"	No	Yes	Yes	No	Yes	Yes	76%	Advanced
III	6	Perfylove Mongoza	"Out Here on My Own"	No	Yes	No	No	No	No	45%	Eliminated
III	7	Itay Paz	"Ha'isha She'iti"	No	No	Yes	No	Yes	Yes	58%	Advanced
IV	8	Yuval Raphael	"Tzipor Medaber"	Yes	Yes	Yes	Yes	Yes	Yes	94%	Saved
IV	9	Daniel Wais	"Yaled HaShadeh"	Yes	Yes	Yes	Yes	Yes	Yes	95%	Advanced

Top 17 round – Show 7 – 28 December 2024
Duel	R/O	Artist	Song	Jury votes						Score	Result
Duel	R/O	Artist	Song	A.A.	E.H.	K.P.	I.L./N.K.	R.D.	S.M.	Score	Result
I	1	Natalie Zafar	"Total Eclipse of the Heart"	Yes	Yes	No	Yes	Yes	Yes	85%	Saved
I	2	Udi Schneider	"Shvil HaBricha"	Yes	Yes	Yes	Yes	Yes	Yes	91%	Advanced
II	3	Red Band and Moran Aharoni	"One"	Yes	Yes	Yes	No	No	Yes	67%	Saved
II	4	Valerie Hamaty	"Desert Rose"	No	Yes	Yes	Yes	Yes	Yes	74%	Advanced
III	5	Amit Sade	"Kach Oti"	Yes	Yes	No	Yes	No	Yes	71%	Advanced
III	6	Aviad Klein	"Iris"	No	Yes	Yes	Yes	No	No	56%	Eliminated
IV	7	Alma Maimon de Razon	"Goodbye Yellow Brick Road"	Yes	No	Yes	No	Yes	No	55%	Saved
IV	8	Yuval Gold	"Le'olam Beikvot HaShemesh"	Yes	Yes	Yes	Yes	Yes	Yes	90%	Advanced

Top 14 round – Show 8 – 29 December 2024
R/O	Artist	Guest artist	Song	Jury votes						Score	Result
R/O	Artist	Guest artist	Song	A.A.	E.H.	K.P.	I.L.	R.D.	S.M.	Score	Result
1	Yuval Raphael	Eden Golan	"Feeling Good"	No	Yes	Yes	Yes	Yes	Yes	86%	Advanced
2	Dolev Mendelbaum	Liran Danino	"Ma Ata Rotza Memani"	Yes	Yes	Yes	No	Yes	Yes	82%	Advanced
3	Itay Paz	Roni Daloomi	"Itay"	No	Yes	Yes	No	Yes	Yes	62%	Eliminated
4	Udi Schneider	Arik Sinai	"Kshe'at Atzuva"	No	No	Yes	Yes	Yes	Yes	72%	Advanced
5	Yuval Gold	Sheri and Adar Gold	"Neged Haroch"	Yes	Yes	Yes	Yes	Yes	Yes	90%	Advanced

Top 14 round – Show 9 – 31 December 2024
R/O	Artist	Guest artist	Song	Jury votes						Score	Result
R/O	Artist	Guest artist	Song	A.A.	E.H.	K.P.	I.L.	R.D.	S.M.	Score	Result
1	Nati Livian	Danny Robas	"Ahavat Ne'orai"	No	Yes	Yes	Yes	Yes	Yes	86%	Advanced
2	Ido Malka	Omri Glickman	"Ani Lo Mafsik Lehitragesh Mimech"	Yes	No	Yes	No	No	Yes	62%	Advanced
3	Daniel Wais	Miri Mesika	"Uf Gozal"	Yes	Yes	Yes	No	Yes	Yes	81%	Advanced
4	Ilay Avidani	Eliad Nachum	"Grenade"	No	No	Yes	Yes	No	No	52%	Eliminated
5	Valerie Hamaty	Eden Hason	"Kshehalev Boche"	Yes	—N/a	Yes	Yes	Yes	Yes	90%	Advanced

Top 14 round – Show 10 – 2 January 2025
R/O	Artist	Guest artist	Song	Jury votes						Score	Result
R/O	Artist	Guest artist	Song	A.A.	E.H.	K.P.	I.L.	R.D.	S.M.	Score	Result
1	Alma Maimon de Razon	Eliana Tidhar and Lee Biran	"Tamid Yechaku Lecha"	Yes	Yes	Yes	Yes	Yes	Yes	96%	Advanced
2	Natalie Zafar	Narkis	"Atalef Iver"	Yes	Yes	No	Yes	No	No	60%	Eliminated
3	Amit Sade	Or Cohen	"Ahuvati Kvar Lo Ro'ah Oti"	Yes	Yes	Yes	Yes	No	No	70%	Advanced
4	Red Band and Moran Aharoni	Shiri Maimon	"Chandelier"	Yes	No	Yes	Yes	Yes	—N/a	75%	Advanced

Top 11 round – Show 11–12 – 4–5 January 2025
R/O	Artist	Song	Jury votes						Score	Result
R/O	Artist	Song	A.A.	E.H.	K.P.	I.L./S	R.D.	S.M.	Score	Result
1	Dolev Mendelbaum	"Beggin'"	No	Yes	Yes	Yes	Yes	Yes	84%	Advanced
2	Daniel Wais	"Fix You"	Yes	Yes	Yes	Yes	No	Yes	80%	Advanced
3	Alma Maimon de Razon	"Umbrella"	No	Yes	Yes	No	No	Yes	50%	Eliminated
4	Ido Malka	"Mi Ata"	Yes	Yes	Yes	No	Yes	Yes	97% (Note: Static awarded a bonus 10%)	Advanced
5	Valerie Hamaty	"Unicorn"	Yes	Yes	Yes	Yes	Yes	Yes	88%	Advanced
6	Nati Livian	"Mirrors"	Yes	Yes	No	Yes	No	No	57%	Advanced
7	Yuval Raphael	"Mon amour"	No	Yes	Yes	Yes	Yes	Yes	94%	Advanced
8	Udi Schneider	"Kol Kach Mukar"	No	No	Yes	Yes	Yes	Yes	62%	Advanced
9	Amit Sade	"Wings"	Yes	Yes	No	Yes	No	Yes	68%	Advanced
10	Yuval Gold	"Love Runs Out"	No	No	No	Yes	No	Yes	57%	Advanced
11	Red Band and Moran Aharoni	"We Parted Ways" (Note: English-language version of "Nifradnu Kach")	Yes	Yes	Yes	Yes	Yes	Yes	89%	Advanced

Top 10 round – Show 13 – 7 January 2025
R/O	Artist	Song	Jury votes						Score	Result
R/O	Artist	Song	A.A.	E.H.	K.P.	I.L.	R.D.	S.M.	Score	Result
1	Yuval Gold	"Kashe Li Lo LeHitragesh"	Yes	Yes	Yes	Yes	Yes	Yes	91%	Advanced
2	Red Band and Moran Aharoni	"Hurricane"	No	Yes	Yes	Yes	Yes	Yes	82%	Saved
3	Dolev Mendelbaum	"Bring You Home"	Yes	Yes	Yes	Yes	Yes	Yes	92%	Advanced
4	Udi Schneider	"Sheleg Basharav"	Yes	Yes	Yes	Yes	Yes	Yes	79%	Eliminated
5	Yuval Raphael	"Hi Yoda'at"	No	Yes	Yes	Yes	Yes	Yes	85%	Advanced

Top 10 round – Show 14 – 11 January 2025
R/O	Artist	Song	Jury votes						Score	Result
R/O	Artist	Song	A.A.	E.H.	K.P.	I.L.	R.D.	S.M.	Score	Result
1	Ido Malka	"Emtsa HaLayla BaKfar"	Yes	Yes	Yes	Yes	Yes	Yes	93%	Advanced
2	Valerie Hamaty	"Bdidut"	Yes	No	Yes	No	Yes	Yes	64%	Saved
3	Amit Sade	"Now That You're Gone"	Yes	Yes	Yes	Yes	Yes	Yes	92%	Advanced
4	Nati Livian	"Lailot VeKlalot"	Yes	No	Yes	Yes	Yes	No	71%	Eliminated
5	Daniel Wais	"Rak SheLo Tipol HaRu'akh"	Yes	Yes	Yes	Yes	Yes	Yes	92%	Advanced

Top 8 round – Show 15 – 12 January 2025
Duel	R/O	Artist	Song	Jury votes						Score	Result
Duel	R/O	Artist	Song	A.A.	E.H.	K.P.	I.L.	R.D.	S.M.	Score	Result
I	1	Dolev Mendelbaum	"Toxic"	Yes	Yes	Yes	Yes	Yes	Yes	86%	Saved
I	2	Yuval Raphael	"Talking to the Moon"	Yes	Yes	Yes	Yes	Yes	Yes	96%	Advanced
II	3	Red Band and Moran Aharoni	"Hallelujah"	Yes	Yes	Yes	Yes	No	Yes	82%	Advanced
II	4	Yuval Gold	"Wake Me Up When September Ends"	Yes	No	No	Yes	Yes	Yes	71%	Saved
III	5	Amit Sade	"Skyfall"	Yes	Yes	No	No	No	Yes	60%	Eliminated
III	6	Daniel Wais	"Rise Up"	No	No	Yes	Yes	Yes	Yes	65%	Advanced
IV	7	Ido Malka	"Story of My Life"	No	Yes	No	Yes	Yes	Yes	75%	Eliminated
IV	8	Valerie Hamaty	"Rise Like a Phoenix"	Yes	Yes	Yes	Yes	Yes	Yes	83%	Advanced

==== Quarterfinal ====
In the quarterfinal, which featured Rita as a guest act and had the contestants performing her songs, the artists were paired in duels with the winners directly qualifying to the next round; the judges then determined which contestant to eliminate from the losers of each duel.

Quarterfinal – 14 January 2025
Duel	R/O	Artist	Song	Jury votes						Score	Result
Duel	R/O	Artist	Song	A.A.	E.H.	K.P.	I.L.	R.D.	S.M.	Score	Result
I	1	Red Band and Moran Aharoni	"To Cry" (Note: English-language version of "Livkot")	Yes	Yes	Yes	Yes	Yes	Yes	88%	Saved
I	2	Dolev Mendelbaum	"Shir Ahuvat HaSapan"	Yes	Yes	Yes	Yes	Yes	Yes	89%	Advanced
II	3	Yuval Gold	"Mekhaka"	No	Yes	Yes	No	Yes	Yes	72%	Eliminated
II	4	Daniel Wais	"Gara Mul HaMayim"	No	Yes	Yes	Yes	Yes	Yes	81% (Note: Rita awarded an extra 5%)	Advanced
III	5	Valerie Hamaty	"Makhol Metoraf"	No	No	Yes	No	Yes	Yes	63%	Saved
III	6	Yuval Raphael	"Ani Khaya Li MiYom LeYom"	Yes	Yes	Yes	Yes	Yes	Yes	95%	Advanced

==== Semi-final ====
In the semi-final, the votes of the judges and the audience determined a qualifier to the final. Afterwards, the scores were reset and an additional round took place, in which the judges individually awarded 12, 10, 8, and 7 points for the remaining four acts. The three acts that received the highest accumulated score from the judges and the studio audience proceeded to the final.

Semi-final – Round 1 – 18 January 2025
R/O	Artist	Song	Jury votes						Score	Result
R/O	Artist	Song	A. A.	E. H.	K. P.	I. L.	R. D.	S. M.	Score	Result
1	Red Band and Moran Aharoni	"Just Let Me In" (Note: English-language version of "Etslekh BaOlam")	Yes	Yes	Yes	Yes	Yes	Yes	92%	Advanced
2	Daniel Wais	"What About Us"	Yes	No	Yes	No	Yes	No	56%	Advanced
3	Valerie Hamaty	"Khomot Khemar"	Yes	Yes	Yes	Yes	Yes	Yes	87%	Advanced
4	Dolev Mendelbaum	"Creep"	No	No	No	Yes	Yes	Yes	66%	Advanced
5	Yuval Raphael	"Warrior"	Yes	Yes	Yes	Yes	Yes	Yes	98%	Finalist

Semi-final – Round 2 – 18 January 2025
Artist	Jury							Audience	Total	Result
Artist	A.A.	E.H.	K.P.	I.L.	R.D.	S.M.	Total	Audience	Total	Result
Daniel Wais	10	7	10	7	12	7	53	Unknown (Note: The total scores for the first three positions were announced as 97, 88 and 80, but it was not disclosed to which artist each referred.)		Advanced
Dolev Mendelbaum	7	10	7	8	8	8	48	29	77	Eliminated
Red Band and Moran Aharoni	8	12	8	10	7	10	55	Unknown		Advanced
Valerie Hamaty	12	8	12	12	10	12	66	Unknown		Advanced

==== Final ====
The final was held on 22 January 2025 and was divided into a first round, eliminating one finalist, and a superfinal among the remaining three artists, determining the winner. On 21 January, a special broadcast was aired featuring performances by guest artists and the finalists, each of whom announced which song they would perform in the first round of the final. A public vote, held via the Mako and Kan apps and determining 30% of the results of the first round, was opened after the performances in the first round of the final. In the superfinal, a 50/50 combination of jury and public votes selected Yuval Raphael as the winner.

Final – 22 January 2025
R/O	Artist	Song	Jury votes							Result
R/O	Artist	Song	A.A.	E.H.	K.P.	I.L.	R.D.	S.M.	Total	Result
1	Daniel Wais	"Let It Be"	12	10	12	10	12	12	68	Eliminated
2	Red Band and Moran Aharoni	"Be Still My Love" (Note: English-language version of "Hi Shketa")	10	12	12	12	10	12	68	Advanced
3	Valerie Hamaty	"Kshe'at Atzuva"	12	12	12	12	12	12	72	Advanced
4	Yuval Raphael	"Dancing Queen"	12	12	12	12	12	12	72	Advanced

Superfinal – 22 January 2025
R/O	Artist	Song	Jury							Viewers	Total	Place
R/O	Artist	Song	A.A.	E.H.	K.P.	I.L.	R.D.	S.M.	Total	Viewers	Total	Place
1	Red Band and Moran Aharoni	"Purple Rain"	10	8	8	10	8	10	54	38	92	3
2	Yuval Raphael	"Writing's on the Wall"	12	12	12	12	10	12	70	87	157	1
3	Valerie Hamaty	"Imagine"	8	10	10	8	12	8	56	55	111	2

=== Song selection ===
The song that Yuval Raphael performed in the contest was internally selected by a professional committee, which consisted of Barak Itzkovitz (director of Kan's music stations), Tal Argaman and Maya Druckman (DJs and music editors at Kan 88), Sharon Drix (Kan's culture and entertainment director); Tali Katz (Kan's culture and entertainment editor-in-chief), Tamira Yardeni (owner of Tedy Productions), and Yoav Tzafir (editor-in-chief of HaKokhav HaBa and Israeli head of delegation at Eurovision). On 30 December 2024, Kan and Keshet opened a window for specially selected songwriters to submit their entries until 2 February 2025; submissions were required to include at least two lines of lyric in Hebrew. Raphael also had the option to submit her own entry. 54 submissions were received at the closing of the deadline. The selected song, titled "New Day Will Rise" and written by Keren Peles, was presented on 9 March during a special broadcast on Kan 11, aired from the Yitzhak Rabin Center in Tel Aviv and hosted by Hila Korach.

=== Calls for exclusion ===
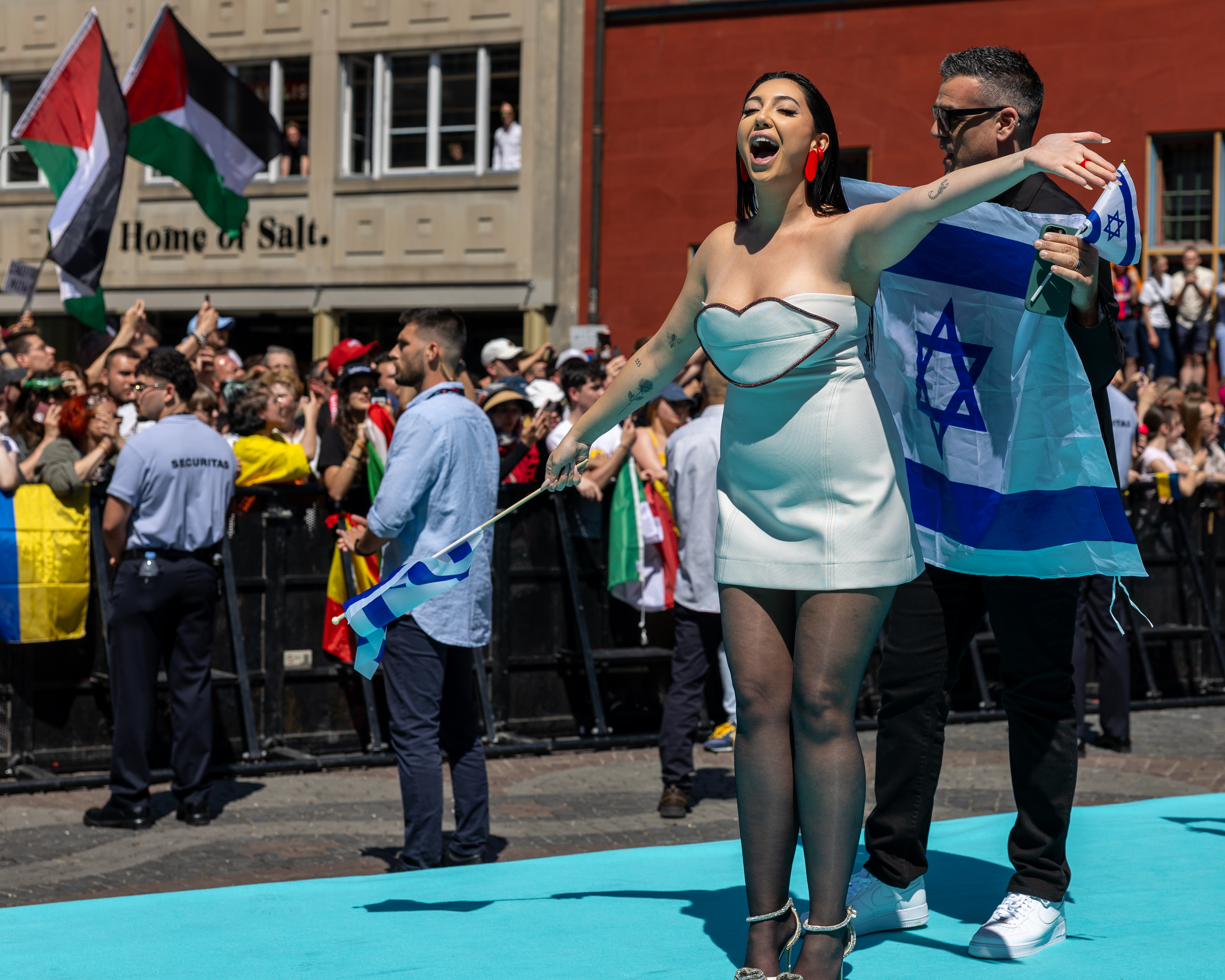
Yuval Raphael on the "Turquoise Carpet" with pro-Palestinian demonstrations in the background, 11 May 2025

Due to the continuing Gaza war, calls were made for the exclusion of Israel, albeit at a smaller scale compared to those that occurred in the run-up to and during the 2024 contest. Nonetheless, demonstrations against Israel's conduct in the war and its participation in the contest took place. The Slovenian broadcaster RTVSLO submitted a demand for the EBU to exclude Israel in December 2024. RTVSLO had also considered withdrawing from the contest and censorship of Israel's performance if Israel were not excluded. The Finnish broadcaster Yle received a petition signed by over 500 Finnish artists in March 2025, demanding that the broadcaster boycotts the contest if Israel were allowed to compete; among the signatories were Eija Ahvo, Eero Ritala, and Sara Melleri. Later that month, José Pablo López, chairman of the Spanish broadcaster RTVE, stated he would put the issue of Israel's participation to a vote in the broadcaster's board of directors in March. RTVE ultimately decided on 11 April that it would request a debate within the EBU regarding Kan's participation, citing "concerns raised by various civil society groups in Spain regarding the situation in Gaza". That same day, the EBU responded to RTVE's letter, acknowledging "concerns and deeply held views around the current conflict in the Middle East" but reiterating that all EBU members are eligible to compete. By the end of April, Flemish Belgian broadcaster VRT likewise joined in calling for a debate on Israel's participation.

A week prior to the start of the contest, a group named "Artists for Palestine UK" released a petition, signed by 72 artists who were involved in previous editions, calling for Israel's exclusion; signatories included Salvador Sobral, winner of the 2017 contest, and Charlie McGettigan, co-winner of the 1994 contest. Around the same time, the National Union of Journalists called on Irish broadcaster RTÉ to demand for Israel's exclusion; RTÉ's director-general Kevin Bakhurst responded by stating that the broadcaster would also request a debate on Israel's participation within the EBU, a request that was acknowledged by the EBU after a meeting with Bakhurst, who stated, "There is a commitment from the EBU to have a wider discussion amongst members in due course". Responding to an op-ed by 18 Norwegian artists calling for Israel's exclusion, broadcaster NRK stated that it would not seek a boycott. In Iceland, 30 former Eurovision entrants signed a petition calling for Israel's exclusion; foreign minister Þorgerður Katrín Gunnarsdóttir said that it was "in the hands of the EBU".

The "Turquoise Carpet" event, held on 11 May 2025 in the host city Basel, was targeted by pro-Palestinian demonstrators aiming to protest Israel's participation. One protester "drew a finger across his throat as if he were threatening to slit Raphael's", which Israeli media outlets interpreted as a death threat. Kan later filed a complaint with the Basel police.

== At Eurovision ==
The Eurovision Song Contest 2025 took place at St. Jakobshalle in Basel, Switzerland, and consisted of two semi-finals held on the respective dates of 13 and 15 May and the final on 17 May 2025. All nations with the exceptions of the host country and the "Big Five" (France, Germany, Italy, Spain and the United Kingdom) were required to qualify from one of two semi-finals in order to compete in the final; the top ten countries from each semi-final progresses to the final. On 28 January 2025, an allocation draw was held to determine which of the two semi-finals, as well as which half of the show, each country would perform in; the EBU split up the competing countries into different pots based on voting patterns from previous contests, with countries with favourable voting histories put into the same pot. Israel was scheduled for the second half of the second semi-final. The shows' producers then decided the running order for the semi-finals; Israel was set to perform in position 14.

=== Performance ===
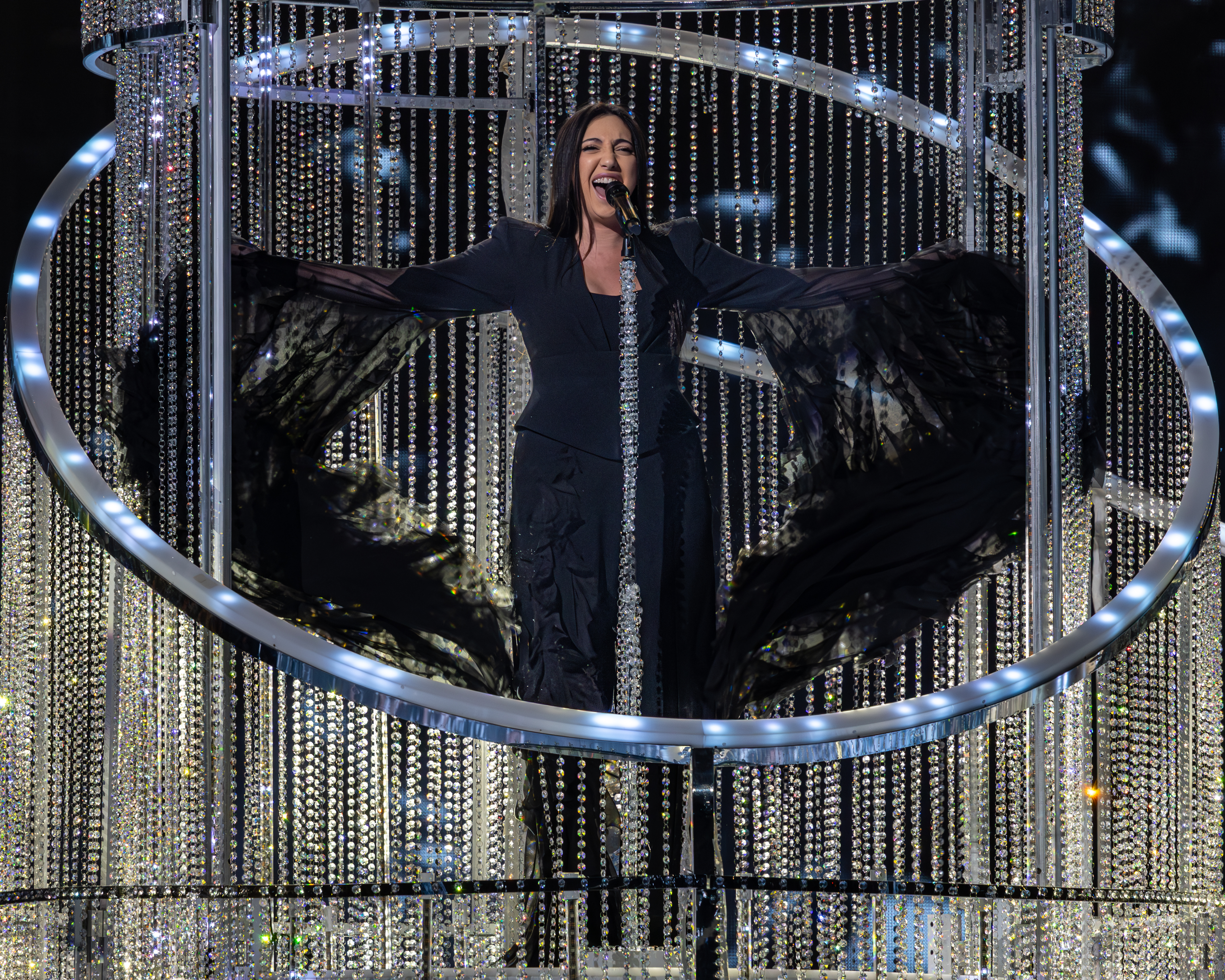
Yuval Raphael at a dress rehearsal for the final

Yuval Raphael took part in technical rehearsals on 6 and 9 May, followed by dress rehearsals on 14 and 15 May. The staging of her performance of "New Day Will Rise" was directed by Shai Bondar, Yuval Cohen, and Yoav Tzafir. The set was a 5.5 m (18 ft) chandelier, with stairs which Raphael climbed during the performance; it is described as a nod to a 1901 photo of Theodor Herzl overlooking the Rhine River from a hotel balcony in Basel.

=== Semi-final ===
Israel performed in position 14, following the entry from Luxembourg and before the entry from Serbia. At the end of the show, the country was announced as a qualifier for the final by winning the semi with 203 points.

=== Final ===
Following the semi-final, Israel drew "producer's choice" for the final, meaning that the country would perform in the half decided by the contest's producers. Israel was set to perform in position 4, following the entry from Estonia and before the entry from Lithuania. Raphael once again took part in dress rehearsals on 16 and 17 May before the final, including the jury final where the professional juries cast their final votes before the live show on 17 May. She performed a repeat of her semi-final performance during the final on 17 May. Israel placed second in the final, scoring 357 points: 297 points from the public televoting and 60 points from the juries. Israel placed first in the public vote.

=== Voting ===
==== Points awarded to Israel ====
Points awarded to Israel (Semi-final 2)
Score	Televote
12 points	Australia; Austria; Czechia; Denmark; Finland; France; Germany; Greece; Ireland; Luxembourg; Malta; Rest of the World; United Kingdom
10 points	Georgia; Latvia; Lithuania
8 points	Montenegro
7 points	Serbia
6 points	
5 points	
4 points	
3 points	
2 points	Armenia
1 point	

Points awarded to Israel (Final)
Score	Televote	Jury
12 points	Australia; Azerbaijan; Belgium; France; Germany; Luxembourg; Netherlands; Portugal; Rest of the World; Spain; Sweden; Switzerland; United Kingdom	Azerbaijan
10 points	Cyprus; Czechia; Finland; Ireland; Norway; San Marino	
8 points	Denmark; Italy	
7 points	Albania; Austria; Georgia; Greece; Latvia; Montenegro	France; Ireland
6 points	Slovenia	Croatia
5 points	Malta	Albania; Cyprus; Netherlands
4 points	Iceland	
3 points	Lithuania	Denmark; Germany
2 points	Estonia; Serbia	Finland; Ukraine
1 point	Ukraine	Georgia; Greece; Luxembourg

==== Points awarded by Israel ====
Points awarded by Israel (Semi-final 2)
Score	Televote
12 points	Armenia
10 points	Luxembourg
8 points	Greece
7 points	Georgia
6 points	Austria
5 points	Malta
4 points	Latvia
3 points	Czechia
2 points	Finland
1 point	Denmark

Points awarded by Israel (Final)
Score	Televote	Jury
12 points	Ukraine	Greece
10 points	Estonia	Germany
8 points	Austria	Malta
7 points	Greece	Latvia
6 points	Armenia	Austria
5 points	Germany	Armenia
4 points	France	Ukraine
3 points	Luxembourg	Italy
2 points	Sweden	Luxembourg
1 point	Finland	Poland

==== Detailed voting results ====
Each participating broadcaster assembles a five-member jury panel consisting of music industry professionals who are citizens of the country they represent Each jury, and individual jury member, is required to meet a strict set of criteria regarding professional background, as well as diversity in gender and age. No member of a national jury was permitted to be related in any way to any of the competing acts in such a way that they cannot vote impartially and independently. The individual rankings of each jury member as well as the nation's televoting results were released shortly after the grand final.

The following members comprised the Israeli jury:

- Asher Asi Tal
- Saar Gamzo
- Yonatan Roe'h
- Avia Farchi
- Noga Klein

Detailed voting results from Israel (Semi-final 2)
R/O	Country	Televote	
R/O	Country	Rank	Points
01	Australia	11	
02	Montenegro	15	
03	Ireland	14	
04	Latvia	7	4
05	Armenia	1	12
06	Austria	5	6
07	Greece	3	8
08	Lithuania	13	
09	Malta	6	5
10	Georgia	4	7
11	Denmark	10	1
12	Czechia	8	3
13	Luxembourg	2	10
14	Israel		
15	Serbia	12	
16	Finland	9	2

Detailed voting results from Israel (Final)
R/O	Country	Jury							Televote	
R/O	Country	Juror 1	Juror 2	Juror 3	Juror 4	Juror 5	Rank	Points	Rank	Points
01	Norway	23	25	23	17	17	23		20	
02	Luxembourg	16	7	7	16	7	9	2	8	3
03	Estonia	18	10	8	20	20	14		2	10
04	Israel									
05	Lithuania	6	14	11	18	10	12		22	
06	Spain	19	23	25	24	21	25		23	
07	Ukraine	10	6	3	13	15	7	4	1	12
08	United Kingdom	22	20	18	21	12	22		21	
09	Austria	4	8	10	1	23	5	6	3	8
10	Iceland	24	24	24	15	25	24		25	
11	Latvia	7	5	4	7	6	4	7	12	
12	Netherlands	20	17	22	6	16	15		11	
13	Finland	8	21	19	10	24	16		10	1
14	Italy	5	9	17	19	4	8	3	15	
15	Poland	11	11	12	9	8	10	1	17	
16	Germany	1	4	1	2	2	2	10	6	5
17	Greece	2	1	2	3	1	1	12	4	7
18	Armenia	9	3	5	11	5	6	5	5	6
19	Switzerland	17	15	16	4	13	11		16	
20	Malta	3	2	6	5	3	3	8	14	
21	Portugal	15	22	21	22	11	21		24	
22	Denmark	21	18	13	23	9	18		18	
23	Sweden	12	16	9	8	22	13		9	2
24	France	13	19	20	14	19	20		7	4
25	San Marino	25	12	14	25	14	19		19	
26	Albania	14	13	15	12	18	17		13	

== After Eurovision ==
Following the contest, RTVE and VRT announced that they would request an audit on the televoting results in their countries, both of which gave their 12 points to Israel, with the former stating that other countries "would be joining them"; VRT additionally called for "full transparency" on the EBU's part, and that it would reconsider its participation in future editions, noting that the contest is "increasingly at odds with the original standards and values of the event, as well as those of public broadcasting." RÚV and Walloon Belgian broadcaster RTBF issued statements in support of the decision. Finnish broadcaster Yle stated it would ask the EBU to rework the televoting system "to avoid its abuse", but it would not emphasise Israel's role in the results; Norwegian broadcaster NRK later came out in support of a review of the voting system. Dutch broadcasters AVROTROS and NPO also joined calls for a wider discussion among EBU members regarding Israel's participation. RTÉ later joined RTVE and VRT in requesting an audit on the televoting results, with the Irish televote having awarded 10 points to Israel.

On 19 May 2025, Eurovision News Spotlight, a fact-checking and open-source intelligence initiative by the EBU, published an investigation which found evidence that the Israel Government Advertising Agency conducted a cross-platform advertising campaign on Google platforms and utilised official state social media accounts to encourage public support for Israel's entry in the contest, and provided instructions on how voters could cast all 20 of their allowed votes for Israel. As part of the investigation, Eurovision News Spotlight analysed a YouTube account created on 20 April, under the username @Vote4NewDayWillRise. Between 6 and 16 May, the account published 89 videos, which collectively garnered over 8.3 million views. The analysis, conducted using open-source tools, found no evidence that artificial intelligence was used for the advertisements, suggesting that Raphael was personally involved in the creation of the promotional videos. The Israeli government had previously admitted to attempting to boost the public vote for the Israeli entry through a promotional campaign during the 2024 contest.

Israel's participation and result was also a topic of discussion in European political fields. The Spanish newspaper El País pointed to mobilisation campaigns by the Israeli government and several European far-right affiliated media outlets as a factor in Israel's high televoting score. Some Belgian members of parliament (MPs) also mentioned an influence campaign by Israeli authorities and questioned the country's participation, while MPs from the Spanish left-wing alliance Sumar registered a proposal to demand a reform in the contest and the removal of Israel from it. Spanish prime minister Pedro Sánchez also called for Israel to be excluded following the contest, saying that "double standards" were being applied by excluding Russia following its 2022 invasion of Ukraine, but not Israel due to its conduct in the Gaza war. The European Commission's coordinator on combating antisemitism, Katharina von Schnurbein, alleged that conspiracy theories had been spread accusing "Jews or the Mossad" for securing Israel second place in the event.
