= Adonxs On Tour =

2022 concert tour by Adonxs

ADONXS On Tour
- Tour by Adonxs
- Location: Slovakia; Czech Republic
- Associated album: Age of Adonxs
- Start date: 16 November 2022
- End date: 7 December 2022
- Legs: 2
- No. of shows: 6
- Supporting acts: Maella

Adonxs On Tour is the first concert tour by Slovak singer-songwriter Adonxs, in support of his debut solo studio album, Age of Adonxs, which was released on November 11, 2022. The tour consists of six announced dates in Slovakia and the Czech Republic, starting on November 16, 2022, in Trenčín, Slovakia, and finishing on December 7, 2022, in Prague, Czech Republic.

== Background and development ==
On September 29, 2022, Adoxns announced through his social media accounts that he would embark on a concert tour across Slovakia and Czechia in support of his debut solo studio album. On October 30, 2022, he announced the album title, Age of Adonxs. The album was officially released six days prior to the start of the tour, on November 11, 2022.

Czech singer Maella opened for Adonxs in all shows of the tour. Adoxns performed all the songs from his debut album, including "Two Romeos", a song he previously performed at a solidarity rally in October 2022 in memory of two queer victims of the 2022 terrorist attack outside an LGBT bar in Bratislava, Slovakia.

In celebration of the launch of the debut album, Adonxs invited his two producers on stage of the Bratislava concert, and painted the compact disc with a blue nail polish that he is known for using in his pre-show ritual for good luck.

== Set list ==
Songs performed during Adonxs On Tour:

- "A Night of a Million Strangers"
- "Moving On"
- "Hold Back the River"
- "Cold Summer"
- "Your Town"
- "Two Romeos"
- "Foreplay"
- "Game"
- "Skin"
- "Drivers License"
- "Overthinker"
- "Snow Moon"
- "Final Round"
- "It's a Sin"

== Tour dates ==
List of concerts, showing date, city, country, venue and opening act(s)
Date	City	Venue	Opening act
Slovakia
November 16, 2022	Trenčín	Piano Club	Maella
November 17, 2022	Košice	Kulturpark	Maella
November 19, 2022	Bratislava	Majestic Music Club	Maella
Czechia
November 23, 2022	Brno	První patro	Maella
November 24, 2022	Ostrava	Barrak	Maella
December 7, 2022	Prague	Palác Akropolis	Maella
