= Valerie Hamaty =

Israeli singer and actress

Valerie Hamaty فالري حماتي ואלרי חמאתי
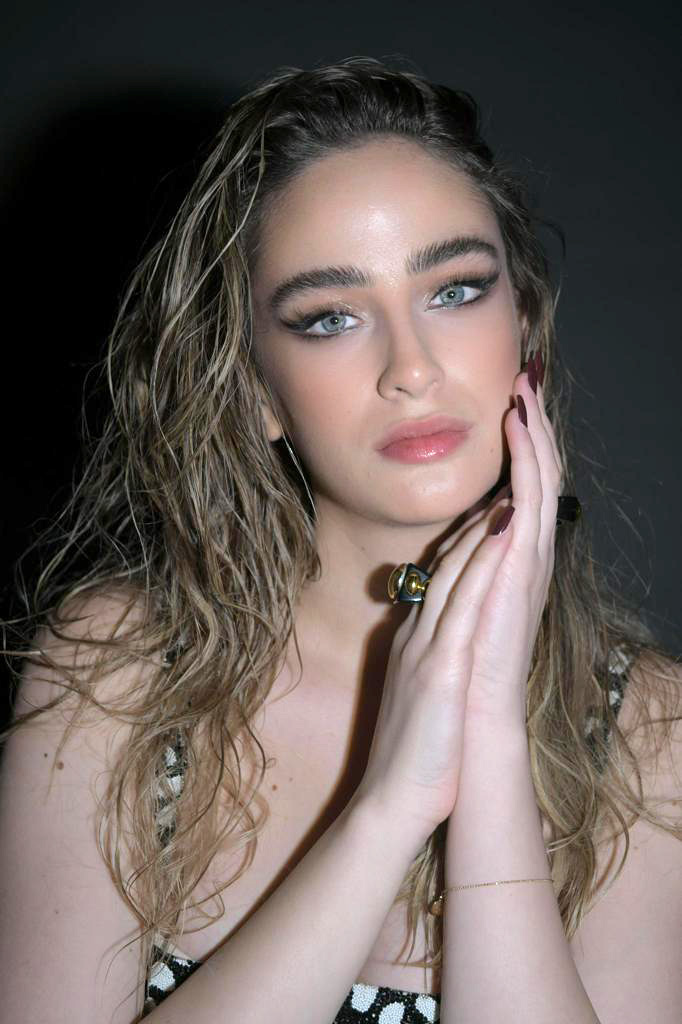
- Hamaty in 2021

Background information
- Born: September 28, 1999 (age 26); Tel Aviv, Israel
- Genres: Mizrahi music; arabic music
- Occupations: Singer; songwriter; actress
- Instruments: Vocals; flute; clarinet
- Years active: 2021–present
- Label: D-Music

Valerie Hamaty (Arabic: فالري حماتي, Hebrew: ואלרי חמאתי; born September 28, 1999) is an Arab Israeli singer, songwriter and actress. She finished in second place in the eighth and eleventh seasons of the singing competition HaKokhav HaBa.

== Biography ==
Hamaty was born and raised in Jaffa, Tel Aviv, to an Arab Christian Orthodox family. Her father, Tony, owns a tapas bar and pizzeria in Jaffa. Her mother, Raymond, is a tax consultant. Hamaty attended Collège des Frères de Jaffa, and later Ironi Dalet High School in Tel Aviv, majoring in biology and chemistry.

At the age of seven, she joined the orchestra of the Orthodox Christian Scout Association, playing the flute and clarinet. At the age of ten, she was accepted to the Israeli dance troupe Mayumana, performing with them for two years.

After graduating from high school, she began studying at Rimon School of Jazz and Contemporary Music in Ramat HaSharon, where she completed a two-year course, and among other things, won third place in the Shirimon competition.

== Career ==
In the summer of 2021, Hamaty competed in the eighth season of the musical reality show HaKokhav HaBa on Keshet 12, and came in second place (after the winner Tamir Grinberg). During her participation in the show, she performed well-known songs in Arabic, Hebrew, and English. On October 2021, she released her debut single after the show, "Kakha Levater", along with an accompanying music video. That same month, she was a guest performer at a concert of Enrico Macias.

In May 2022, she performed at the torch-lighting ceremony on Mount Herzl. On July 10, 2022, she released her fourth single, "Albi". In October 2022, she released the single "Ala Bali", which reached number four on the Media Forest weekly chart. She played Tirtza Atar in the play "Od Hozer HaNigun" at Habima Theatre. Also in October 2022, she participated in the television special Tribute to Dana International, which aired to mark the 20th anniversary of the Israel Gay Youth (IGY) and the musical career of Israeli singer and trans icon Dana International, in which she performed "Saida Sultana".

Starting in January 2023, she plays Manar in the youth series "Madrasa" by Sayed Kashua, which tells the story of the students and staff of a bilingual Jewish-Arab school in Jerusalem. She also sings the theme song of the series. In addition, since the same year, Hamaty plays Yasmine Dhaud in the youth series "Thalatha" which aired on Nickelodeon. On February 5, she released the single "Laila". On June 26, she released the single "Hayim". On August 30, she released the single "Kmo Meshuga", a collaboration with Osher Biton. On September 4, she released the single "Ma'aruf".

In 2024, she participated in the third season of the show "Rokdim Im Kokhavim" on Keshet. On March 17, the song "Mishala", was released in collaboration with singer Ivri Lider. On June 30, Hamaty released the single "Shome'a". Hamaty is expected to star in the series "Tahrir" on Yes. In November 2024, she returned to HaKokhav HaBa for its 11th season with the goal of representing Israel in the Eurovision Song Contest 2025 in Basel, Switzerland, eventually finishing second behind Yuval Raphael.

== Discography ==
- Shuftak (2021)
- Kakha Levater (2021)
- Mangina (2022)
- Ana Mallet (2022)
- Yeladim Shel HaHayim (2022)
- Halvai (2022)
- Albi (2022)
- Ala Bali (2022)
- Madrasa (2023)
- Laila (2023)
- Hayim (2023)
- Kmo Meshuga (2023)
- Ma'aruf (2023)
- Mishala (2024)
- Habaitak (2024)
- Shome'a (2024)
