= OK TV (Czech TV channel) =

Czech television channel

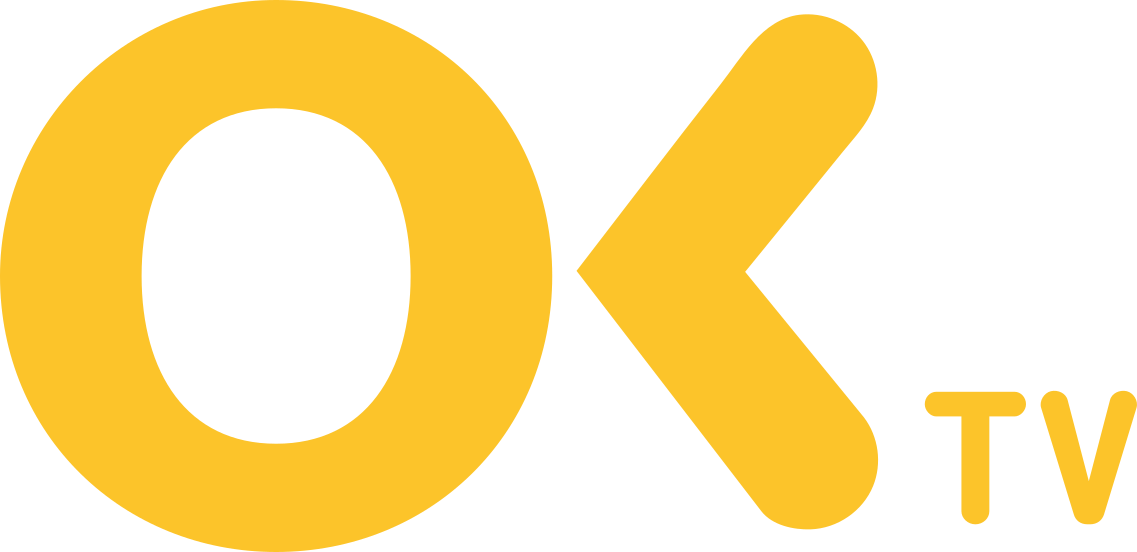
- Country: Czech Republic
- Broadcast area: Czech Republic
- Headquarters: Prague

Programming
- Language: Czech

History
- Launched: 16 May 2024
- Closed: 1 December 2025

Links
- Website: oktv.cz (closed)

OK TV was a Czech television channel, launched in 2024. It started broadcast on 16 May 2024. It was described as entertainment-lifestyle and music television. It focused on positive programming without violence and without reports focused on war conflicts or other negative events.

== History ==
OK TV was owned by OK TV Music Television Company. It received license to broadcast in December 2023 and started preparing launch for May 2024. New channel was introduced to public on 7 May 2024. It introduced 20 programs of its own production and main faces of the channel that include Šárka Vaňková, Alice Bendová, Pavel Anděl, Martin Dejdar, Aleš Cibulka, Miloš Knor or Eva Decastelo. Launch of the new channel was set for 16 May 2024. Management of the channel announced plans to get 2% share of the market.

Channel started broadcast on 16 May 2024. The main distribution channels was all-area DVB-T2 multiplex 24 of the Digital Broadcasting company. OK TV has signed a contract with five operator companies: SledováníTV, PODA, Lepší.TV, Antik Telekom and Grape SC. OK TV is discussing terms with Vodafone.

Due to a dispute between CEO Jan Hloch and TV founders Jana and Artur Kaiser, OK TV stopped broadcasting just after midnight between 15 and 16 November, 2024. Founders of the station declared their intention to resume broadcasting with a new license. Broadcast resumed on 12 December 2024.

On 16 October 2025, OK TV suspended its DVB-T2 terrestrial broadcasting. The Council for Radio and Television Broadcasting (RRTV) granted the station a 90-day grace period to resume operations (an extension from the standard 30 days). On 4 November 2025, the channel's internet stream went offline, rendering OK TV unavailable across all pay-TV providers. The station was removed from DVB-T2 multiplex 24 on 2 December 2025 after its temporary pause notice was replaced with a black screen.

Broadcasting never resumed and the station's licenses officially expired on 16 January 2026, based on a formal surrender notice delivered to the RRTV on 19 January 2026.

== Programming ==
Programs introduced during start of broadcast:

- OK Start
- Jeden na jednoho
- Co Čech, to professor
- Face to face
- Kartotéka Martina Hrdinky
- Andělská noc
- Hvězdy manéže
- VIP Koktejl
- S Alicí v kuchyni
- Holky na tahu
- Sejdeme se u Cibulky
- Talk show Miloše Knora
- Naplno
- Káraoke
- Škola hrou
- Tety Květy
