= Red Band =

Israeli puppetry comedy musical band

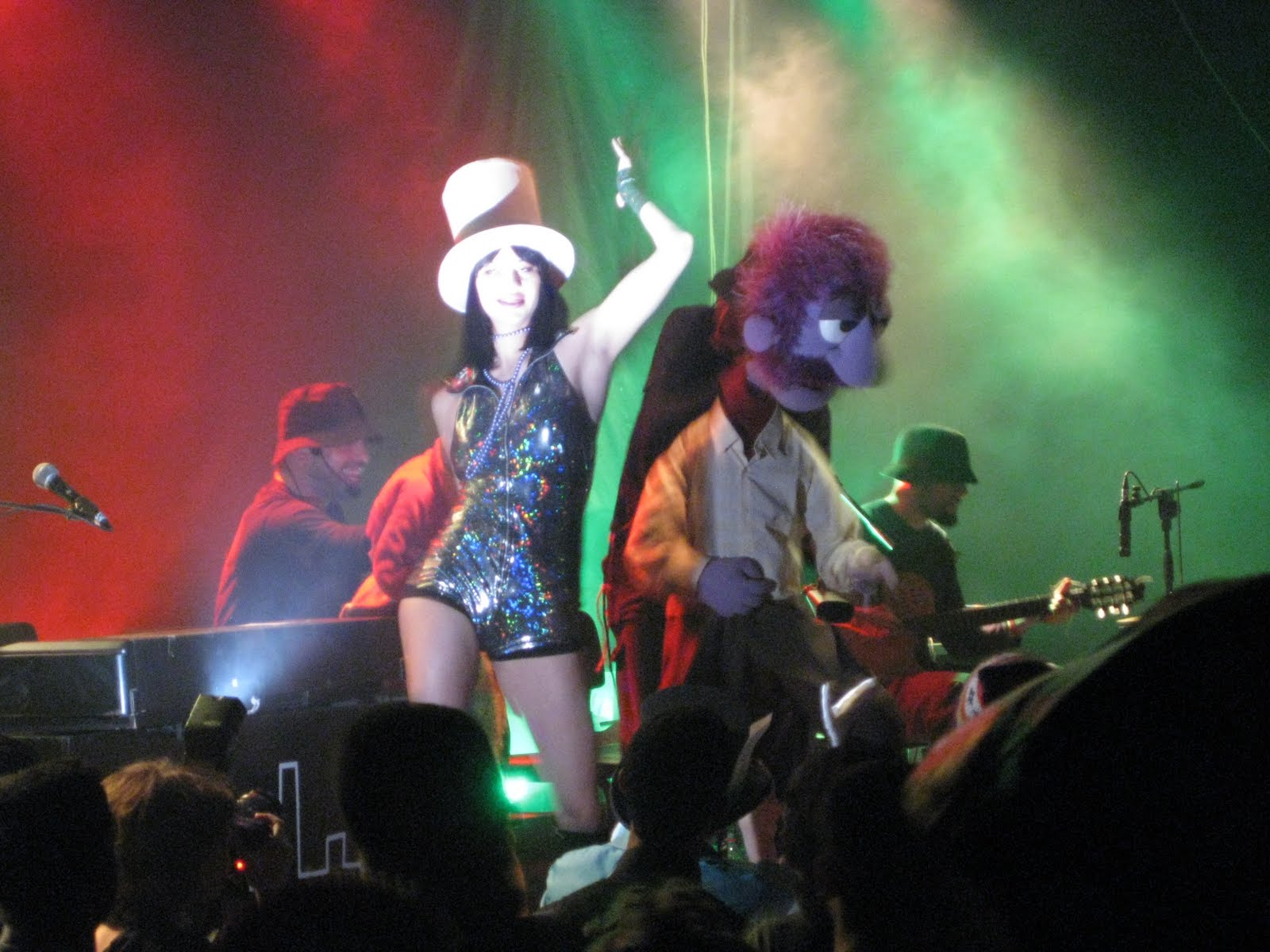
Red Band at a special Purim show at the Comfort Club, Tel Aviv, 2010

Red Band (Hebrew: רד בנד, romanized: Red Band) is an Israeli puppetry comedy musical band, founded by Ari Pepper, Micha Doman and Ami Wiesel. It started as a street show with the name in English language, "The Puppet Folk Revival" in 2005. Since then it also the base of the TV show with the same name, Red Band (2008–2011) and TV program The Red and Dvir Show (three seasons, 2013–2016, on Channel 13).

Ari Pepper operates Red Auerbach, "the most successful fictional Israeli star".

In 2009 in won the Israeli Television Academy award in the comedy series category.

The band supporting Moran Aharoni covering the song "Purple Rain" were the runner-up in the competition to represent Israel in the Eurovision Song Contest 2025.
