= Crossroads (Daniel Žižka song) =

2026 song by Daniel Zizka

Single by Daniel Zizka
- Released: 11 March 2026
- Genre: Indie pop
- Length: 3:00
- Songwriters: Daniel Žižka; Viliam Béreš

Daniel Zizka singles chronology
"Never Felt Like Less" (2025)	"Crossroads" (2026)

Music video
- "Crossroads" on YouTube

Eurovision Song Contest 2026 entry
- Country: Czech Republic
- Artist: Daniel Zizka
- Language: English
- Composers: Viliam Béreš; Daniel Žižka
- Lyricists: Viliam Béreš; Daniel Žižka

Finals performance
- Semi-final result: 9th
- Semi-final points: 142
- Final result: 16th
- Final points: 113

Entry chronology
- ◄ "Kiss Kiss Goodbye" (2025)

"Crossroads" is a song by Czech singer-songwriter Daniel Žižka. It was released on 11 March 2026 and represented the Czech Republic in the Eurovision Song Contest 2026 in Vienna, Austria.

== Background and composition ==
The song was written by Daniel Žižka and Czech composer Viliam Béreš. According to Žižka, the writing process took approximately two years, and the song explores themes of uncertainty and choosing one's path in life.

Musically, "Crossroads" combines indie pop and alternative pop influences with atmospheric production and emotional vocal delivery.

== Eurovision Song Contest ==
On 11 March 2026, Czech broadcaster Czech Television announced that Daniel Žižka had been internally selected to represent Czechia in the Eurovision Song Contest 2026 with the song "Crossroads".

The song competed in the second semi-final of the contest held in Vienna. It qualified for the grand final, where it finished in 16th place with 113 points.

The song received positive reactions from Eurovision fans and critics, particularly for Žižka's live vocals and atmospheric staging. However, Daniel's performance in the final was affected by several technical issues: and although the Czech delegation submitted a request to perform again, they were denied to do so.
