= Age of Adonxs =

2022 album by Adonxs

Studio album by Adonxs
- Released: 11 November 2022
- Recorded: January–November 2022
- Studio: Lavagance Studios
- Genre: Pop
- Length: 28:16
- Label: Warner
- Producer: Oliver Fillner

Singles from Age of Adonxs
- 1. "Moving On" Released: 15 May 2022; 2. "Game" Released: 19 August 2022; 3. "Cold Summer" Released: 18 October 2022; 4. "OVRTHNKR" Released: 22 November 2023

Age of Adonxs (stylized in all caps) is the debut solo studio album by Slovak singer Adonxs, released on 11 November 2022 via Warner. The album marks his first body of work since his 2018 EP Keeper released with his alt-pop band Pace. The album was preceded by four singles, two of which topped the SK Top 50 Chart. It has been pre-nominated for the 2022 Anděl Award for Best Slovak Album.

== Background ==
Following his 2021 win in SuperStar, Adonxs signed with Warner and began writing and recording his solo material with producer Oliver Fillner. Recording took place at the Lavagance Studios in Bratislava, Slovakia, from January to November 2022. In early January, Adonxs recorded four songs from the album, including "Moving On", which would become the lead single.

== Promotion and release ==
=== Singles ===
Age of Adonxs was supported by four singles, two of which topped the SK Top 50 Chart. The debut solo single "Moving On" marked his first number one on the chart. The second single "Game" marked his second number one on the SK Top 50 Chart, where it reigned atop for eight consecutive weeks. The third single "Cold Summer" was released on 18 October 2022. The album was officially released on 11 November 2022. Musicserver rated it as the best album of 2022 in Slovakia. It received nominations at the 2022 Ruka Hore Awards as well as the 2022 Anděl Awards. On 22 November 2022, "Overthinker" was released as the fourth single from the album.

=== Tour ===
Five days following the album release, Adonxs embarked on the Adonxs On Tour. It covered Slovakia and the Czech Republic with six dates. It commenced on 16 November 2022, in Trenčín, Slovakia, and concluded on 7 December 2022, in Prague, Czech Republic. Czech singer Maella supported him as an opening act on all tour dates.

== Awards and nominations ==
Year	Award	Category	Result
2022	Anděl Awards	Best Slovak Album	Prenominated
2022	Ruka Hore Awards	Album of the Year	Nominated

== Track listing ==
Credits adapted from the album's liner notes.

Age of Adonxs track listing
No.	Title	Writer(s)	Length
1.	"A Night of a Million Strangers"	Adonxs; Oliver Fillner	2:54
2.	"Moving On"	Adonxs; Oliver Fillner; Tom Löbb	3:05
3.	"Final Round"	Adonxs; Oliver Fillner; Marek Rakovicky; Tom Löbb	3:05
4.	"Your Town"	Adonxs; Oliver Fillner	3:06
5.	"Foreplay"	Adonxs; Oliver Fillner	0:44
6.	"Game"	Adonxs; Oliver Fillner	2:48
7.	"Two Romeos"	Adonxs; Oliver Fillner; Marek Rakovicky	3:22
8.	"Snow Moon"	Adonxs; Oliver Fillner; Tom Löbb; Marek Rakovicky	3:16
9.	"Cold Summer"	Adonxs; Oliver Fillner	2:44
10.	"Overthinker"	Adonxs; Oliver Fillner; Marek Rakovicky	2:35
Total length:			28:16

== Charts ==
Weekly chart performance for Age of Adonxs
Chart (2022)	Peak position
Slovak Albums (ČNS IFPI)	88
