= Kiss Kiss Goodbye =

2025 single by Adonxs

Single by Adonxs

from the album Death of a Pop Star
- Released: 7 March 2025
- Length: 2:57
- Label: Warner
- Composers: Adam Pavlovčin; George Masters-Clark; Lorenzo Calvo; Ronald Janeček
- Lyricists: Adam Pavlovčin; Adriano Lopes da Silva; Ines Coulon; Michaela Charvátová

Adonxs singles chronology
"Intergalactic Rodeo" (2024)	"Kiss Kiss Goodbye" (2025)	"Wasted" (2025)

Music videos
- "Kiss Kiss Goodbye" on YouTube "Kiss Kiss Goodbye" (acoustic version) on YouTube

Eurovision Song Contest 2025 entry
- Country: Czech Republic
- Artist: Adonxs
- Language: English
- Composers: Adam Pavlovčin; George Masters-Clark; Lorenzo Calvo; Ronald Janeček
- Lyricists: Adam Pavlovčin; Adriano Lopes da Silva; Ines Coulon; Michaela Charvátová

Finals performance
- Semi-final result: 12th
- Semi-final points: 29

Entry chronology
- ◄ "Pedestal" (2024)
- "Crossroads" (2026) ►

Official performance video
- "Kiss Kiss Goodbye" (second semi-final) on YouTube

"Kiss Kiss Goodbye" is a song by Slovak singer-songwriter Adonxs. It was written by Adonxs, George Masters-Clark, Ines Coulon, Lorenzo Calvo, Michaela Charvátová and Ronald Janeček. The acoustic version was first presented on 4 February 2025 while the studio version was released on 7 March. It represented Czechia in the Eurovision Song Contest 2025.

== Eurovision Song Contest ==
=== Internal selection ===
On 11 December 2024, ČT announced that Adonxs, would represent Czechia in Basel, while the song "Kiss Kiss Goodbye" was announced as the Czech entry on 31 January 2025. Adonxs and the song were selected in various rounds by a ten-member international jury consisting of music professionals and former Eurovision entrants, a demoscopic jury consisting of 900 members from three countries, and a focus group. An acoustic version of the song was presented to the public on 4 February 2025 during the first semi-final of the 2025 Maltese national final, while its studio version was released on 7 March.

=== At Eurovision ===
The Eurovision Song Contest 2025 took place at St. Jakobshalle in Basel, Switzerland, and consisted of two semi-finals held on the respective dates of 13 and 15 May and the final on 17 May 2025. During the allocation draw held on 28 January 2025, the Czech Republic was drawn to compete in the second semi-final, performing in the second half of the show. Adonxs was later drawn to perform 12th, after Denmark's Sissal and before Luxembourg's Laura Thorn. The Czech Republic did not qualify for the final.

For its Eurovision performance, the staging was led by the creative director and lighting designer Matyáš Vorda and camera director Vít Bělohradský, the same team behind Czechia's Eurovision stagings since 2022. František Čech was also appointed as the stage choreographer.

== Track listing ==
Digital download/streaming

1. "Kiss Kiss Goodbye" – 2:56

Digital download/streaming

1. "Kiss Kiss Goodbye" (Sunkissed remix) – 2:56

== Charts ==
Chart performance for "Kiss Kiss Goodbye"
Chart (2025)	Peak position
Lithuania (AGATA)	92
Slovakia Airplay (ČNS IFPI)	34

== Release history ==
Release dates and formats for "Kiss Kiss Goodbye"
Region	Date	Format(s)	Version	Label	Ref.
Various	7 March 2025	Digital download; streaming	Original	Warner	
Various	25 July 2025	Digital download; streaming	Sunkissed remix	Warner	
