= International Dance Organization =

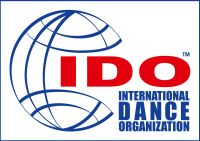
- Founded: 18.09.1981
- Type: Dance sport
- VAT ID no.: CVR 27 02 52 93
- Purpose: Dance sport, Competitions, Festivals, Education
- Headquarters: Slagelse, Denmark
- Location: Slagelse, Denmark
- Region served: Worldwide
- Members: over 90 worldwide
- Official languages: English
- Key people: President: Prof Velibor Srdic Senior Vice President: Fiona Johnson; Executive Secretary: Kirsten Dan Jensen Vice presidents: Bonnie Dyer Klaus Höllbacher Aleena Tan Edilio Pagano Trajce Petkovski Hana Svehlova
- Website: https://www.ido-dance.com/

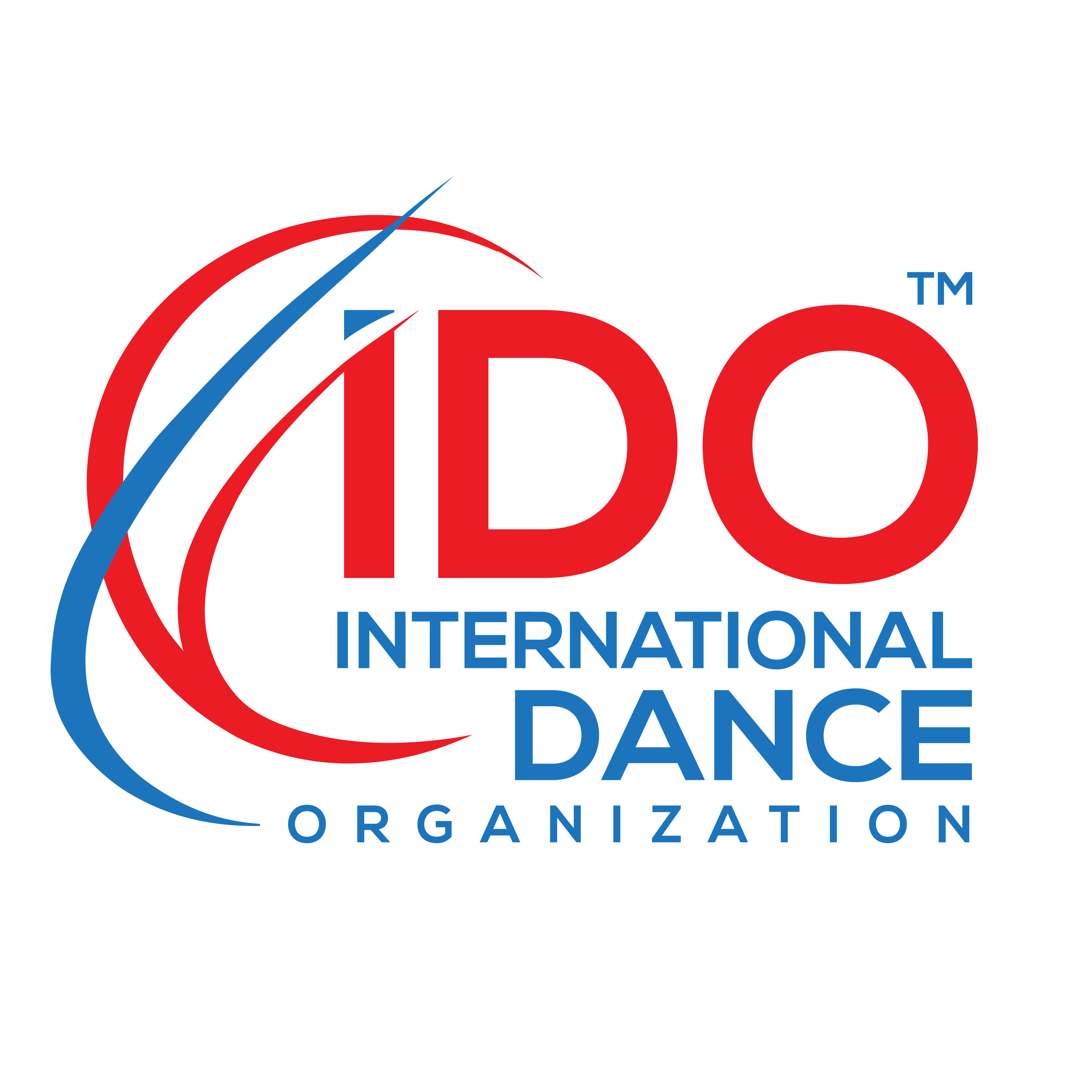
Official IDO Logo

The International Dance Organization (IDO) is an official, independent, politically neutral, non-profit world dance and dance sport federation, registered in Slagelse, Denmark. It governs competitions and activities in performing arts, street dance/urban disciplines, and couple dances. Members of the IDO are national dance federations, and only non-profit organizations are eligible for membership.

The IDO organizes a wide range of international competitions, including World and Continental Championships across multiple dance disciplines. Some of its major events run for more than a week and include World Championships in Show Dance, Tap Dance, Ballet, Modern & Contemporary Dance, Jazz Dance, and Street Dance styles, hosted annually in various countries.

== History ==
IDO was founded on September 18, 1981, by four countries: France, Gibraltar, Italy and Switzerland. The founder and first General Secretary was Moreno Polidori from Italy.

Leading the IDO:

- IDO General Secretary Moreno Polidori, Italy (1981 – 1998)

Since 1998 the IDO is headed by the IDO President:

- Nils Hakan Carlzon, Sweden (1998 – 2008)
- Bill Fowler, USA (2008 – 2011)
- Jörn Storbraten, Norway (2011 – 2014)
- Michael Wendt, Germany (2014 - 2021)
- Prof. Dr. Velibor Srdic (2021 - 2022 acting president)
- Prof. Dr. Velibor Srdic (2022 - today)

== Structure ==
The IDO Executive Presidium (EPM) runs the daily business and consists of the President, the Senior Vice President and the Executive Secretary. The IDO Presidium consists of the EPM and 6 Vice Presidents with specific duties.

Nils Hakon Carlzon, Bill Fowler and Michael Wendt have been honoured as Honorary Lifetime Presidents.

The election of the Presidium takes place in a staggered system according to which the President, the Senior Vice President, the Executive Secretary/Treasurer and two (2) Vice Presidents (A, B) are elected in year 1, the four other Vice Presidents (C, D, E, F) are elected in year 3, each for a term of four (4) years. The three Department Directors, Performing Arts, Street Dance and Couple Dance, are elected every three years at their Annual Department Meeting (ADM) and also serve on the Presidium. Same for the elected chairpersons of the Continental Conferences.

The AGA is also responsible for all changes in the statutes and by-laws. The ADMs are responsible for the Dance Sport rules, which are ratified by the AGA. To enable the experts in each specific field to discuss their department matters at the level where the dancers are, IDO has installed the following committees and departments:

- Adjudication committee
- Disciplinary committee
- Education committee
- Couple Dance department
- Performing Arts department
- Street Dance department

=== Worldwide memberships and structure ===
IDO has more than 90 member nations and contacts on all six continents, representing more than 250,000 dancers worldwide. To ensure growth and focus on existing intercontinental and new countries worldwide, the IDO has installed ambassadors to develop the IDO idea and structure. For example in

- Asia / Asia-Pacific - Michael Wendt, Germany,
- The Americas - Bonnie Dyer, Canada.
- Iberian peninsula - Seamus Byrne, Gibraltar

Besides running competitions and festivals, IDO established its Hall of Fame to honour dance celebrities, dancers and dance enthusiasts who have made significant contributions to IDO’s Dance World.

IDO also follows the anti-doping requirements requested.

IDO is affiliated to TAFISA and EUSA.

== Dance disciplines and competitions ==
Each year the IDO organizes World, Continental and Regional championships and cups in the IDO dance disciplines.

=== Age divisions ===
- Mini Kids
- Children
- Junior I
- Junior II
- Adults
- Adult 2
- Seniors

=== Categories ===
- Solo female
- Solo male
- Duo
- Couples
- Trio (Tap Dance only)
- Group/Team (3-7 dancers)
- Formation (8-24 dancers)

=== Dance styles ===
PERFORMING ARTS DISCIPLINES

- Acrobatic Dance
- Ballet/Pointe
- Belly Dance/Oriental
- Bollywood
- Flamenco
- Folklore Dance
- Jazz Dance
- Modern Dance and Contemporary Dance
- Performing Arts Improvisation
- Show Dance
- Tap Dance
- Productions

STREET DANCE DISCIPLINES

- Breaking
- Popping
- Hip Hop
- Hip Hop Battles
- Disco Dance
- Disco Dance Freestyle
- Disco Dance Show
- Disco Slow
- Street Dance Show
- Productions

COUPLE DANCE DISCIPLINES

- Argentine Tango (Tango, Milonga, Tango Vals and Tango Fantasia)
- Bachata
- Caribbean Dances (Salsa, Merengue, Bachata)
- Caribbean Show
- Couple Dance Formations
- Hustle/Disco-Swing/Disco-Fox
- Jitterbug
- Latin Show
- Latin Style
- Merengue
- Salsa
- Salsa Rueda de Casino
- Synchro Dance
- West Coast Swing
- Productions
