= Arno Krabman =

Dutch songwriter and producer

- Born: 19 March 1982 (age 43); Leeuwarden, Netherlands
- Origin: Wijdemeren, Netherlands
- Genres: Dutch pop music
- Occupations: Songwriter; producer; session musician
- Instrument: Guitar
- Years active: 2005–present
- Website: www.gravelandstudio.com

Arno Krabman (Dutch pronunciation: [ˈɑrnoː ˈkrɑpmɑn]; born 19 March 1982) is a Dutch songwriter and producer. He is known for his work with, among others, Suzan & Freek, Snelle, S10 and Claude, and has had over thirty-five Dutch Single Top 100 hits as a songwriter. His repertoire consists mainly of Dutch-language pop songs.

== Early life and education ==
Krabman was born on 19 March 1982 in Leeuwarden, Friesland. He studied Music and Technology at the Utrecht School of the Arts in Hilversum. During his studies, he worked as a session musician. Brendan O'Brien and Max Martin have been cited as Krabman's main artistic influences.

== Career ==
Krabman's first release as a songwriter was the single "Jou" by Maud Mulder in 2005. In 2006, he first entered the Dutch Single Top 100 and Dutch Top 40 with the song "Ik wacht al zo lang" by Lange Frans & Baas B. Krabman has since been prominently involved in the production of the studio albums Drive (2013) by Anneke van Giersbergen, In mijn bloed (2017) by Roxeanne Hazes, Gedeeld door ons (2019) and Dromen in kleur (2021) by Suzan & Freek, and Lars (2021) by Snelle. He also created the soundtrack for the Dutch drama series The Spectacular, which was released in early 2022.

Krabman has scored number-one hits in the Netherlands with the singles "Als het avond is" (2019) by Suzan & Freek, "Blijven slapen" (2021) by Snelle & Maan, and "De diepte" (2022) by S10. The song "Nu wij niet meer praten" (2020) by Jaap Reesema & Pommelien Thijs reached number one in both the Netherlands and Belgium.

In 2018, Krabman was a member of the Dutch jury for the Eurovision Song Contest 2018. In 2021, the song "De diepte", which Krabman had co-written with S10, was internally selected by the Dutch broadcaster AVROTROS to represent the Netherlands in the Eurovision Song Contest 2022. By finishing in second place in the first semi-final on 10 May 2022, it became the first Dutch-language entry to reach the final of the Eurovision Song Contest since the introduction of the semi-finals in 2004. In the final on 14 May 2022, the entry finished in 11th place with 171 points. Claude represented the Netherlands in the Eurovision Song Contest 2025 with the song "C'est la vie", which was co-written by Krabman.

== Personal life ==
Krabman is in a relationship with Nienke de Jong, who was the lead singer of the metal band Autumn from 1999 to 2008. They own a recording studio in Wijdemeren, North Holland, located between the villages Kortenhoef and 's-Graveland.

== Songwriting discography ==
=== Charting singles ===
Title	Year	Peak chart positions				Co-written with
Title	Year	NLD (100)	NLD (40)	BEL (FL)	DEU	Co-written with
"Ik wacht al zo lang" (Lange Frans and Baas B feat. Brutus & Tim)	2006	16	18	—	—	Tim Akkerman, Frans Frederiks, Thijs Frederiks, Bart Zeilstra
"Leen mijn ogen" (Jeroen van der Boom)	2011	19	—	—	—	Han Kooreneef
"Dat het nooit meer ophoudt" (Jeroen van der Boom)	2011	7	—	—	—	Han Kooreneef
"Mistakes I've Made" (Eelke Kleijn)	2014	49	33	—	—	Adam Argyle, David Etherington, Eelke Kleijn, Karen Poole
"Find You" (Topic feat. Jake Reese)	2016	—	—	—	57	Jaap Reesema, Jona Selle, Tobias Topic, Joren van der Voort, Matthias Zürkler
"Break My Habits" (Topic)	2017	—	—	—	58	Patrik Jean, Jona Selle, Tobias Topic
"Leef" (André Hazes Jr.)	2015	93	—	3	—	Edwin van Hoevelaak, Koen Jansen, Chiel Ottink
"Als het avond is" (Suzan & Freek)	2019	3	1	4	—	Léon Palmen, Freek Rikkerink, Suzan Stortelder
"Blauwe dag" (Suzan & Freek)	2019	5	4	5	—	Koen Jansen, Freek Rikkerink, Suzan Stortelder
"Mag ik daar even stil bij staan" (Suzan & Freek)	2019	55	—	—	—	Léon Palmen, Freek Rikkerink, Suzan Stortelder
"Deze is voor mij" (Suzan & Freek)	2019	46	19	27	—	Niels Geusebroek, Léon Palmen, Freek Rikkerink, Suzan Stortelder
"Weg van jou" (Suzan & Freek)	2020	20	12	21	—	Léon Palmen, Freek Rikkerink, Suzan Stortelder
"Kleur" (Snelle)	2020	4	7	32	—	Lars Bos, Daan Ligtvoet
"De overkant" (Suzan & Freek and Snelle)	2020	6	2	11	—	Lars Bos, Léon Palmen, Freek Rikkerink, Suzan Stortelder
"In de schuur" (Snelle and Ronnie Flex)	2020	10	12	—	—	Sander de Bie, Lars Bos, Ronell Plasschaert, Delano Ruitenbach
"Nu wij niet meer praten" (Jaap Reesema and Pommelien Thijs)	2020	2	1	1	—	Jaap Reesema, Joren van der Voort
"Papa heeft weer wat gelezen" (Snelle and Thomas Acda)	2020	53	39	—	—	Thomas Acda, Lars Bos
"Als ik je weer zie" (Acda & De Munnik, Maan and Typhoon)	2021	5	6	—	—	Thomas Acda, Paul de Munnik, Glenn de Randamie, Maan de Steenwinkel
"Blijven slapen" (Snelle and Maan)	2021	1	1	10	—	Okke Punt, Delano Ruitenbach, Maan de Steenwinkel, Lars Bos
"Goud" (Suzan & Freek)	2021	4	2	17	—	Léon Palmen, Freek Rikkerink, Suzan Stortelder
"Zonder jas naar buiten" (Snelle)	2021	45	—	—	—	Sander de Bie, Lars Bos, Okke Punt
"Frans Duits" (Donnie and Frans Duijts)	2021	10	19	—	—	Billy Dans, Donny Ellerström, Dennis Foekens
"Alles komt goed" (Jaap Reesema)	2021	31	21	15	—	Jaap Reesema, Joren van der Voort
"Alles" (Miss Montreal)	2021	64	33	—	—	Sanne Hans, Léon Palmen, Freek Rikkerink, Suzan Stortelder
"Onderweg naar later" (Suzan & Freek)	2021	8	10	36	—	Léon Palmen, Freek Rikkerink, Suzan Stortelder
"Dromen in kleur" (Suzan & Freek)	2021	21	15	27	—	John Ewbank, Léon Palmen, Freek Rikkerink, Suzan Stortelder
"Voor je van me houdt" (Jaap Reesema)	2021	77	30	43	—	Jaap Reesema, Joren van der Voort
"In m'n bloed" (Snelle)	2021	22	14	—	—	Sander de Bie, Lars Bos, Okke Punt
"De diepte" (S10)	2022	1	1	4	—	Stien den Hollander
"Honderd keer" (Suzan & Freek)	2022	12	3	48	—	Léon Palmen, Freek Rikkerink, Suzan Stortelder
"How Love Works" (Milow)	2022	—	—	30	—	Martin Gallop, Jonathan Vandenbroeck
"Kwijt" (Suzan & Freek)	2022	12	5	48	—	Martijn Konijnenburg, Léon Palmen, Freek Rikkerink, Suzan Stortelder
"Ladada (Mon dernier mot)" (Claude)	2022	1	1	—	—	Claude Kiambe, Joren van der Voort
"Stiekem" (Maan and Goldband)	2022	1	2	2	—	Milo Driessen, Karel Gerlach, Wieger Hoogendorp, Boaz Kok, Maan de Steenwinkel
"Slapeloosheid" (Suzan & Freek)	2023	9	7	7	—	Martijn Konijnenburg, Léon Palmen, Freek Rikkerink, Suzan Stortelder
"Layla" (Claude)	2023	11	8	—	—	Claude Kiambe, Joren van der Voort
"Nooit meer regen" (Suzan & Freek)	2023	29	18	20	—	Martijn Konijnenburg, Léon Palmen, Freek Rikkerink, Suzan Stortelder
"Vas-y (Ga maar)" (Suzan & Freek and Claude)	2023	8	5	44	—	Claude Kiambe, Freek Rikkerink, Suzan Stortelder, Joren van der Voort
"De helft van mij" (Suzan & Freek)	2023	46	—	15	—	Léon Palmen, Freek Rikkerink, Suzan Stortelder
"Écoutez-moi" (Claude)	2024	32	14	—	—	Claude Kiambe, Joren van der Voort
"Je t'aime" (Claude and Zoë Tauran)	2024	44	28	—	—	Diederik van Elsas, Brahim Fouradi, Claude Kiambe, Zoë Tauran, Joren van der Voort, Carlos Vrolijk

=== Eurovision Song Contest entries ===
Year	Country	Song	Artist	Co-written with	Semi-final		Final	
Year	Country	Song	Artist	Co-written with	Place	Points	Place	Points
2022	Netherlands	"De diepte"	S10	Stien den Hollander	2	221	11	171
2025	Netherlands	"C'est la vie"	Claude	Claude Kiambe, Léon Paul Palmen, Joren van der Voort	3	121	12	175

=== Eesti Laul entries ===
Year	Song	Artist	Co-written with
2017	"Everything but You"	Carl-Philip	Carl-Philip Madis, Carola Madis, Noah McNamara, Léon Palmen, Jaap Reesema
