= List of best-selling singles in the Netherlands =

The following is a list of the best-selling singles in the Netherlands. Depends on the measurement, list is divided by claimed sales and official certifications from NVPI, which certification system operates since 1978.

== List of best-selling singles ==
=== By claimed sales ===
Year	Artist	Title	Sales
1997	Elton John	"Candle in the Wind 1997"	600,000
1969	Johnny Hoes	"Och Was Ik Maar"	450,000
1978	Boney M	"Rivers of Babylon"	400,000
1977	Vader Abraham	"'t Smurfenlied"	400,000
2003	Jamai Loman	"Step Right Up"	300,000
1982	Doe Maar	"De Bom"	250,000
1977	Boney M	"Ma Baker"	250,000
1994	Marco Borsato	"Dromen Zijn Bedrog"	250,000
1965	Nini Rosso	"Il Silenzio"	250,000
1958	Schriebl & Hupperts	"Schnee-Walzer"	250,000
1960	The Blue Diamonds	"Ramona"	250,000
1978	John Travolta & Olivia Newton-John	"You're the One That I Want"	200,000
1990	Sinéad O'Connor	"Nothing Compares 2 U"	170,000
1997	Wes	"Alane"	170,000
1977	Eddy Ouwens	"I Remember Elvis Presley (The King Is Dead)"	160,000
1960	Elvis Presley	"It's Now or Never"	160,000
1976	ABBA	"Dancing Queen"	150,000
1970	D.C. Lewis	"Mijn Gebed"	135,000
1969	Percy Sledge	"My Special Prayer"	130,000
1976	BZN	"Mon Amour"	130,000
1989	Dave A. Stewart ft. Candy Dulfer	"Lily Was Here"	125,000
1968	Barry Ryan	"Eloise"	100,000
1976	Dillinger	"Cokane in My Brain"	100,000
1967	De Heikrekels	"Jij Bent Voor Mij Alleen"	100,000
1977	Donna Summer	"I Feel Love"	100,000
1968	Egbert Douwe	"Kom Uit De Bedstee Mijn Liefste"	100,000
1966	Frank Sinatra	"Strangers in the Night"	100,000
1970	Gilbert O'Sullivan	"Nothing Rhymed"	100,000
1968	Heintje	"Ich bau' Dir ein Schloß"	100,000
1967	Heintje	"Mamma"	100,000
1976	Julie Covington	"Don't Cry for Me Argentina"	100,000
1965	Nancy Sinatra	"These Boots Are Made for Walkin'"	100,000
1966	The Monkees	"I'm a Believer"	100,000
1972	Mouth and MacNeal	"Hello-A"	100,000
1978	Patrick Hernandez	"Born to Be Alive"	100,000
1970	Peter Maffay	"Du"	100,000
1967	Procol Harum	"A Whiter Shade of Pale"	100,000
1971	Rod McKuen	"Soldiers Who Want to be Heroes"	100,000
1971	Rod McKuen	"Without A Worry in the World"	100,000
1967	The Beatles	"Hello, Goodbye"	100,000
1968	The Beatles	"Hey Jude"	100,000
1965	The Rolling Stones	"(I Can't Get No) Satisfaction"	100,000
1969	Wilma	"80 Rode Rozen"	100,000
1968	Wim Sonneveld	"De Kat Van Ome Willem"	100,000

=== Highest certified singles ===
As of 2023
Year	Artist	Title	Sales	Certified sales
1997	Elton John	"Candle in the Wind 1997"	450,000	6× Platinum
2019	Emma Heesters with Rolf Sanchez	"Pa Olvidarte"	320,000	4× Platinum^{‡}
2019	Kris Kross Amsterdam with Maan, Tabitha featuring Bizzey	"Hij Is van mij"	320,000	4× Platinum^{‡}
2019	Kris Kross Amsterdam with Kraantje Pappie and Tabitha	"Moment"	320,000	4× Platinum^{‡}
2021	Kris Kross Amsterdam with Antoon and Sigourney K	"Vluchtstrook"	320,000	4× Platinum^{‡}
2018	Frenna & Lil' Kleine	"Verleden tijd"	320,000	4× Platinum^{‡}
2021	Donnie & René Froger	"Bon Gepakt"	240,000	3× Platinum^{‡}
2021	FLEMMING	"Amsterdam"	240,000	3× Platinum^{‡}
2021	Goldband	"Noodgeval"	240,000	3× Platinum^{‡}
2003	Jamai Loman	"Step Right Up"	240,000	4× Platinum
2019	Lil Nas X	"Old Town Road"	240,000	3× Platinum^{‡}
1994	Marco Borsato	"Dromen Zijn Bedrog"	225,000	3× Platinum
1994	Van Dik Hout	"Stil In Mij"	225,000	3× Platinum^{‡}
2015	Kenny B	"Parijs"	210,000	6× Platinum^{‡}
2015	Mike Posner	"I Took a Pill in Ibiza"	180,000	6× Platinum^{‡}
2018	Aya Nakamura	"Djadja"	160,000	2× Platinum^{‡}
2021	Donnie & Frans Duijts	"Frans Duits"	160,000	2× Platinum
2022	Claude	"Ladada (Mon dernier mot)"	160,000	2× Platinum
2021	FLEMMING	"Automatisch"	160,000	2× Platinum^{‡}
2020	Kris Kross Amsterdam with Tino Martin and Emma Heesters	"Loop niet weg"	160,000	2× Platinum^{‡}
2021	Kris Kross Amsterdam, Donnie & Tino Martin	"Vanavond (Uit M’n Bol)"	160,000	2× Platinum^{‡}
2022	Libianca	"People"	160,000	2× Platinum
2018	Frenna, Jonna Fraser, Emms & Idaly	"Louboutin"	150,000	2× Platinum

== Notes ==
- ^{‡}Certification include on-demand audio and video streams and track sale equivalent

== See also ==
- List of best-selling singles
- List of best-selling singles by country
- Music of the Netherlands
- NVPI
