= Stiekem =

2022 single by Maan

Single by Maan featuring Goldband

from the album Leven
- Language: Dutch
- Released: 4 November 2022
- Genre: Synth-pop
- Length: 3:23
- Label: 8ball Music
- Songwriters: Arno Krabman; Boaz Kok; Karel Gerlach; Maan de Steenwinkel; Milo Dreissen; Wieger Hoogendoorp
- Producers: Wieger Hoogendoorp; Arno Krabman

Maan singles chronology
"Sowieso overhoop" (2022)	"Stiekem" (2022)	"Paranoia" (2024)

Goldband singles chronology
"Noodgeval" (2021)	"Stiekem" (2022)	"Rommel" (2023)

"Stiekem" (lit. 'Secretly') is a song by Dutch musician Maan featuring Dutch group Goldband. It was released on 4 November 2022 and would also appear on a reissue of Maan's second studio album Leven.

The synth-pop song was released after Maan publicised her relationship with Goldband member Karel Gerlach, themes which were explored in the music video. It peaked at number two on the Dutch Top 40 for nine weeks. It also won Song of the Year and Video of the Year at the 2023 Edison Awards.

In May 2023, the Dutch Top 40 announced that "Stiekem" was the biggest Dutch-language hit song of all time, surpassing Gers Pardoel's "Ik neem je mee" (2011).

== Background ==
In August 2022, Maan was a surprise onstage guest during Goldband's performance at the Lowlands festival in Biddinghuizen. Soon after, Goldband member Karel Gerlach confirmed that he was dating Maan, confirming rumours that had persisted in the media for months.

Maan was a fan of Goldband and wanted to do a song with them even before her relationship with Gerlach. About whether or not the song is specifically about their relationship, she said, "I also find things like this quite private and up to yourself to figure it out and discover it. The song is of course about a kind of early love and not even necessarily about us at first, but in general that the start of a relationship is such a super fun period. But it's special that something like that connects us forever, for sure."

In March 2023, "Stiekem" won Song of the Year and Video of the Year at the Edison Awards.

== Commercial performance ==
The song was quickly named Alarmschijf by Qmusic and a 3FM Megahit by NPO 3FM.

In November 2022, "Stiekem" debuted at No. 13 on the Dutch Top 40, making it the highest entry of the week. The next week, it jumped up eleven spots to No. 2, making it Maan's fourth top-two hit. It would spend nine weeks at number two in 2022 and 2023, being blocked from the top spot by David Guetta and Bebe Rexha's "I'm Good (Blue)", as well as Claude's "Ladada (Mon dernier mot)", making it the song with the third-most weeks ever at No. 2.

In May 2023, the Dutch Top 40 announced that "Stiekem" became the biggest Dutch-language hit single in chart history, overtaking Gers Padoel's "Ik neem je mee" (2011). It accomplished this without ever reaching No. 1 for a single week. It remained on the chart for 32 weeks in total.

== Reception ==
In 2023, "Stiekem" was the highest entry in the Netherlands' annual Top 2000 songs of all time poll hosted by NPO Radio 2, debuting at No. 180. As a result, the station honoured Maan and Goldband with the NPO Radio 2 Top 2000 Award.

== Music video ==
The music video for "Stiekem", directed by Véras Fawaz, was released on the same day as the song. Maan plays a fictional celebrity named Mary Jane and is followed to her house by a gang of photographers, including the Goldband members. Karel Gerlach's character is invited into the house, where he is blindfolded and struck with a hammer. This is seen by other photographers, who also attempt to access Maan before being beaten up.

== Charts ==
=== Weekly charts ===
Weekly chart performance for "Stiekem"
Chart (2022–23)	Peak position
Belgium (Ultratop 50 Flanders)	2
Netherlands (Dutch Top 40)	2
Netherlands (Single Top 100)	1

=== Yearly charts ===
Year-end chart performance for "Stiekem"
Chart (2022)	Position
Netherlands (Dutch Top 40)	59
Netherlands (Single Top 100)	73

Chart (2023)	Position
Belgium (Ultratop 50 Flanders)	6
Netherlands (Dutch Top 40)	5
Netherlands (Single Top 100)	2
