= Netherlands in the Eurovision Song Contest 2025 =

- Eurovision Song Contest 2025
- Participating broadcaster: AVROTROS
- Country: Netherlands
- Selection process: Internal selection
- Announcement date: Artist: 19 December 2024; Song: 27 February 2025

Competing entry
- Song: "C'est la vie"
- Artist: Claude
- Songwriters: Arno Krabman; Claude Kiambe; Joren van der Voort; Léon Paul Palmen

Placement
- Semi-final result: Qualified (3rd, 121 points)
- Final result: 12th, 175 points

Participation chronology

The Netherlands was represented at the Eurovision Song Contest 2025 with the song "C'est la vie", written by Arno Krabman, Claude Kiambe, Joren van der Voort, and Léon Paul Palmen, and performed by Claude himself. The Dutch participating broadcaster, AVROTROS, internally selected its entry for the contest. Claude's appointment as the Dutch representative was announced on 19 December 2024, while the song, "C'est la vie", was presented to the public on 27 February 2025.

The Netherlands was drawn to compete in the first semi-final of the Eurovision Song Contest which took place on 13 May 2025. Performing during the show in position 13, "C'est la vie" was announced among the top 10 entries of the first semi-final and therefore qualified to compete in the final on 17 May. It was later revealed that the Netherlands placed third out of the 17 participating countries in the semi-final with 121 points. In the final, the Netherlands performed in position 12 and placed twelfth out of the 26 participating countries, scoring 175 points. This would be the final time AVROTROS was responsible for the Dutch participation in the contest as they would boycott the 2026 contest due to the continued Gaza war and Israel's participation.

== Background ==
Prior to the 2025 contest, AVROTROS and its predecessor national broadcasters had participated in the Eurovision Song Contest representing the Netherlands sixty-four times since NTS's debut in the inaugural contest in 1956. Since then, they had won the event five times: in 1957 with the song "Net als toen" performed by Corry Brokken, in 1959 with the song "'n Beetje" by Teddy Scholten, in 1969 as one of four countries to tie for first place with "De troubadour" by Lenny Kuhr, in 1975 with "Ding-a-dong" by the group Teach-In, and in 2019 with "Arcade" by Duncan Laurence. Following the introduction of semi-finals for the 2004 contest, they had featured in nine finals. They ended last on five occasions, most recently in the second semi-final of the 2011 contest. In 2024, "Europapa" by Joost Klein placed second in its semi-final and qualified for the final, but was disqualified due to a backstage incident involving Klein and a production staff member. This incident was subsequently investigated by Swedish prosecutors, who later dropped the case after concluding that no criminal conduct could be proven.

As part of its duties as participating broadcaster, AVROTROS organises the selection of its entry in the Eurovision Song Contest and broadcasts the event in the country. The broadcaster has used various methods to select the Dutch entry in the past, such as the Nationaal Songfestival, a live televised national final to choose the performer, song or both to compete at Eurovision. Internal selections have also been held on occasion, including every year since 2013. On 23 October 2024, AVROTROS confirmed its participation in the 2025 contest, announcing that it would continue to internally select its entry after Klein declined its offer to represent the Netherlands for a second consecutive time.

== Before Eurovision ==
=== Internal selection ===
A submission period was opened by AVROTROS on 23 October 2024 where artists and composers were able to submit their entries until 22 November 2024. Artists had to be affiliated with a record company or label and have recent stage experience, while songwriters were not required to indicate a performer for their song, who would be selected afterwards; however, precedence would be given to complete submissions. Each artist and songwriter was able to submit a maximum of three songs. 331 submissions were received by the broadcaster at the closing of the deadline, and among the artists involved included former Dutch Eurovision entrants Gerard Joling (1988), Anouk (2013) and Douwe Bob (2016).

On 19 December 2024, AVROTROS announced that it had selected Claude to represent the Netherlands at the 2025 contest. The selection of Claude as the Dutch representative was carried out by a committee consisting of singers Jacqueline Govaert and Jaap Reesema, radio DJs Carolien Borgers, Hila Noorzai and Sander Lantinga, and television host and author Cornald Maas, following a final audition round featuring a shortlist of six acts, including singers Judith van Hirtum and Paul Morris, that took place on 9 December 2024. During an interview on the NPO 1 talk show Eva the same day the artist announcement occurred, Claude revealed that his Eurovision song was written by himself together with Arno Krabman, Joren van der Voort and Léon Paul Palmen. The song, titled "C'est la vie", was released on 27 February 2025 but was leaked online in its entirety the day prior to the reveal.

== At Eurovision ==
The Eurovision Song Contest 2025 took place at St. Jakobshalle in Basel, Switzerland, and consisted of two semi-finals held on the respective dates of 13 and 15 May and the final on 17 May 2025. All nations with the exceptions of the host country and the "Big Five" (France, Germany, Italy, Spain and the United Kingdom) were required to qualify from one of two semi-finals in order to compete in the final; the top ten countries from each semi-final progress to the final. On 28 January 2025, an allocation draw was held to determine which of the two semi-finals, as well as which half of the show, each country would perform in; the European Broadcasting Union (EBU) split up the competing countries into different pots based on voting patterns from previous contests, with countries with favourable voting histories put into the same pot. The Netherlands was drawn to compete in the first semi-final, performing in the second half of the show. The shows' producers then decided the running order for the semi-finals; the Netherlands was set to perform in position 13.

In the Netherlands, all the shows were broadcast on NPO 1, with commentary provided by Cornald Maas, and the final on NPO Radio 2, with commentary by Carolien Borgers. NPO also broadcast the contest internationally on BVN.

=== Semi-final ===
The Netherlands performed in position 13, following the entry from Albania and before the entry from Croatia. At the end of the show, the country was announced as a qualifier for the final. It was later revealed that it had placed third out of 16 countries in the semi-final, receiving 121 points.

Following the semi-final, the Netherlands drew "producer's choice" for the final, meaning that the country would perform in the half decided by the contest's producers. The Netherlands was set to perform in position 12, following the entry from Latvia and before the entry from Finland.

=== Final ===
Claude once again took part in dress rehearsals on 16 and 17 May before the final, including the jury final where the professional juries cast their final votes before the live show. He performed a repeat of their semi-final performance during the final on 17 May. The Netherlands placed twelfth in the final, scoring 175 points: 42 points from the televoting and 133 points from the juries.

=== Voting ===
Below is a breakdown of points awarded to and by the Netherlands in the first semi-final and in the final. Voting during the three shows involved each country awarding sets of points from 1–8, 10 and 12: one from their professional jury and the other from televoting in the final vote, while the semi-final vote was based entirely on the vote of the public. The Dutch jury consisted of Dennis van Leeuwen, Frits Ritmeester, Ronald de Bas, Gaia Aikman, Quinty Mesiedjan. Over the course of the contest, the Netherlands awarded its 12 points to Poland in the first semi-final, and to Austria (jury) and Israel (televote) in the final.

AVROTROS appointed Chantal Janzen, who had previously co-hosted the 2021 contest, as its spokesperson to announce the Dutch jury's votes in the final.

==== Points awarded to Netherlands ====
Points awarded to Netherlands (Semi-final 1)
Score	Televote
12 points	Belgium; Switzerland
10 points	Cyprus; Estonia; Norway; Portugal
8 points	Iceland; Sweden
7 points	Albania
6 points	Slovenia; Ukraine
5 points	Italy
4 points	Poland
3 points	Azerbaijan; Croatia; San Marino (Note: San Marino uses a jury in the semi-finals.); Spain
2 points	
1 point	Rest of the World

Points awarded to Netherlands (Final)
Score	Televote	Jury
12 points		
10 points		Iceland; Ireland; Poland; Spain
8 points		Cyprus; Greece; Lithuania; Sweden
7 points		Czechia; Georgia; Luxembourg
6 points	Greece; Iceland	Switzerland
5 points	Belgium; Norway	Norway; Portugal
4 points	Estonia	Slovenia
3 points	Austria; Portugal	Albania; Armenia; Azerbaijan; Belgium; France
2 points	Armenia; San Marino; Sweden	Austria; Montenegro
1 point	Albania; Cyprus; Lithuania; Switzerland	Estonia

==== Points awarded by Netherlands ====
Points awarded by Netherlands (Semi-final 1)
Score	Televote
12 points	Poland
10 points	Iceland
8 points	Ukraine
7 points	Sweden
6 points	Estonia
5 points	Belgium
4 points	Albania
3 points	Portugal
2 points	Norway
1 point	Croatia

Points awarded by Netherlands (Final)
Score	Televote	Jury
12 points	Israel	Austria
10 points	Poland	Switzerland
8 points	Estonia	Sweden
7 points	Sweden	Portugal
6 points	Finland	Luxembourg
5 points	Greece	Israel
4 points	Ukraine	Lithuania
3 points	Austria	Latvia
2 points	Italy	France
1 point	Germany	Albania

==== Detailed voting results ====
Each participating broadcaster assembles a five-member jury panel consisting of music industry professionals who are citizens of the country they represent. Each jury, and individual jury member, is required to meet a strict set of criteria regarding professional background, as well as diversity in gender and age. No member of a national jury was permitted to be related in any way to any of the competing acts in such a way that they cannot vote impartially and independently. The individual rankings of each jury member as well as the nation's televoting results were released shortly after the grand final.

The following members comprised the Dutch jury:

- Dennis van Leeuwen
- Frits Ritmeester
- Ronald de Bas
- Gaia Aikman
- Quinty Misiedjan

Detailed voting results from Netherlands (Semi-final 1)
R/O	Country	Televote	
R/O	Country	Rank	Points
01	Iceland	2	10
02	Poland	1	12
03	Slovenia	11	
04	Estonia	5	6
05	Ukraine	3	8
06	Sweden	4	7
07	Portugal	8	3
08	Norway	9	2
09	Belgium	6	5
10	Azerbaijan	14	
11	San Marino	12	
12	Albania	7	4
13	Netherlands		
14	Croatia	10	1
15	Cyprus	13	

Detailed voting results from Netherlands (Final)
R/O	Country	Jury							Televote	
R/O	Country	Juror A	Juror B	Juror C	Juror D	Juror E	Rank	Points	Rank	Points
01	Norway	11	22	5	19	8	14		20	
02	Luxembourg	5	6	3	4	13	5	6	21	
03	Estonia	10	13	8	18	20	17		3	8
04	Israel	1	21	6	21	10	6	5	1	12
05	Lithuania	12	25	15	6	2	7	4	13	
06	Spain	20	19	16	17	9	19		18	
07	Ukraine	19	9	18	25	21	20		7	4
08	United Kingdom	7	10	10	14	16	16		24	
09	Austria	4	8	1	1	1	1	12	8	3
10	Iceland	13	17	4	12	14	15		15	
11	Latvia	14	5	20	5	12	8	3	14	
12	Netherlands									
13	Finland	24	23	25	20	24	25		5	6
14	Italy	6	11	7	9	18	11		9	2
15	Poland	15	16	19	8	4	13		2	10
16	Germany	16	4	9	11	17	12		10	1
17	Greece	21	15	12	10	11	18		6	5
18	Armenia	18	24	23	22	22	23		19	
19	Switzerland	2	3	13	3	5	2	10	16	
20	Malta	23	20	17	24	23	22		23	
21	Portugal	8	2	14	2	6	4	7	17	
22	Denmark	22	14	21	15	19	21		22	
23	Sweden	3	1	2	13	15	3	8	4	7
24	France	9	12	11	7	7	9	2	12	
25	San Marino	25	18	22	23	25	24		25	
26	Albania	17	7	24	16	3	10	1	11	
