= List of best-selling albums in the Netherlands =

The following is a list of the best-selling albums in the Netherlands.

== List of albums ==
Year	Artist	Album	Certifications	Shipments/Sales
1982	Michael Jackson	Thriller	8× Platinum	2,000,000
1978	John Travolta & Olivia Newton-John	Grease	—	1,000,000
1976	Eagles	Hotel California	Platinum	800,000
1972	Ennio Morricone	Once Upon a Time in the West	Platinum	800,000
1970	Simon & Garfunkel	Bridge over Troubled Water	—	750,000
1994	André Rieu	Strauss & Co	7× Platinum	700,000
1997	Marco Borsato	De waarheid	6× Platinum	700,000
1977	Bee Gees Various artists	Saturday Night Fever	Platinum	650,000
1996	Celine Dion	Falling into You	6× Platinum	600,000
1993	Mariah Carey	Music Box	6× Platinum	600,000
1974	Robert Long	Vroeger of later	5× Platinum	600,000
1992	Whitney Houston / Various artists	The Bodyguard	Platinum	600,000
1995	Marco Borsato	Als geen ander	4× Platinum	530,000
1976	ABBA	Arrival	Gold	500,000
1975	ABBA	The Best of ABBA	—	500,000
2011	Adele	21	4× Platinum	500,000
1997	Celine Dion	Let's Talk About Love	5× Platinum	500,000
1998	Marco Borsato	De bestemming	5× Platinum	500,000
1977	Meat Loaf	Bat Out of Hell	Platinum	500,000
1987	Michael Jackson	Bad	Platinum	500,000
1997	Shania Twain	Come On Over	5× Platinum	500,000
1991	Queen	Greatest Hits II	5× Platinum	500,000
1985	Dire Straits	Brothers in Arms	Platinum	470,387
1992	Golden Earring	The Naked Truth	3× Platinum	450,000
1972	Thijs Van Leer	Introspection	—	450,000
2002	Norah Jones	Come Away with Me	2× Platinum	415,000
1978	Dire Straits	Dire Straits	Platinum	407,633
1995	Andrea Bocelli	Bocelli	2× Platinum	400,000
1997	Anouk	Together Alone	4× Platinum	400,000
1995	Alanis Morissette	Jagged Little Pill	4× Platinum	400,000
1992	Eric Clapton	Unplugged	4× Platinum	400,000
1998	Ilse DeLange	World of Hurt	5× Platinum	400,000
2005	Katie Melua	Piece by Piece	2× Platinum	400,000
2000	Marco Borsato	Luid en duidelijk	4× Platinum	400,000
1989	Phil Collins	...But Seriously	2× Platinum	400,000

== See also ==
- NVPI
- List of best-selling albums
  - List of best-selling albums by country
- List of best-selling singles in the Netherlands
