= Dit was het nieuws =

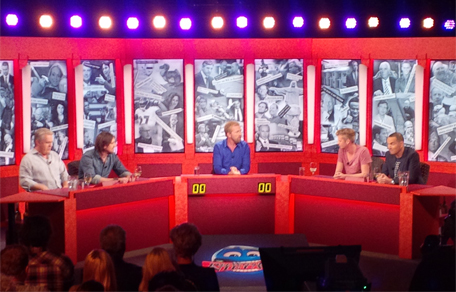
- From left to right Thomas Acda, Mattie Valk, Harm Edens, Wietze de Jager, Raoul Heertje.
- Genre: Current affairs, satire
- Based on: Have I Got News for You
- Presented by: Harm Edens
- Starring: Peter Pannekoek (2017–present) (Note: In the fall of 2021 and 2025, Pannekoek was occupied with preparing to present that year's Oudejaarsconference (New Year's Conference) on NPO 1. In 2021, he was replaced by Patrick Laureij and Daniël Arends (alternating). In 2025, each episode featured a different duo taking place at his table.); Jan Jaap van der Wal (2001–2010, 2017–present); Raoul Heertje (1996–2014); Thomas Acda (1996–2000, 2011–2014); Peter Heerschop (2000); Marc-Marie Huijbregts (2000); Martijn Koning (2015); Daniël Arends (2015, 2021); Patrick Laureij (2021)
- Country of origin: Netherlands
- Original language: Dutch
- No. of seasons: 51
- No. of episodes: 326

Production
- Running time: ±45 minutes
- Production companies: Hat Trick Productions; AVROTROS (2017–present); TROS (1996–2009); RTL (2010–2015)

Original release
- Network: NPO 1 (AVROTROS, 2017–present); NPO 2 (TROS, 1996–2006); NPO 1 (TROS, 2006–2009)
- Release: 28 June 1996 – present
- Network: RTL 4
- Release: 5 June 2010 – 10 October 2015

Dit was het nieuws (Dutch pronunciation: [ˈdɪt ʋɑs ət ˈnius]; Dutch for "This was the news") is a Dutch television panel show, produced by AVROTROS and broadcast on NPO 1, wherein two teams give a satirical account of the previous week's news. The program has the form of a game show in which two teams, each with a team leader and weekly guest, compete against each other. The scoring is not serious; after the first round, for instance, the score is always 4-4.

== History ==
Dit was het nieuws is based on the BBC television program Have I Got News for You. On 28 June 1996, the first episode of Dit was het nieuws was aired by broadcasting station TROS on the Nederland 2 channel. The team leaders were Thomas Acda and Raoul Heertje, and the show was hosted by Harm Edens.

Initially, the program garnered the same bleak impression that many failed attempts of satirical television in the Netherlands had given in the past. However, thanks to the members' council of TROS, the program had the chance to become a successful variation of the British show.

The core of the show's cast remained the same until the sixth season (2000), when Thomas Acda left the show in order to pursue a singing career with Paul de Munnik (Acda en De Munnik). The seventh season was a special season about the European Football Championship, and comedian Peter Heerschop replaced Acda as one of the permanent team leaders. For the next season, comedian Marc-Marie Huijbregts replaced Peter Heerschop as team leader. Huijbregts' successor was young comedian Jan Jaap van der Wal, who served as team captain for a decade.

Even though the show had been increasing in ratings and was becoming more popular, TROS decided to discontinue the program in 2009. While other public networks had expressed interest in the program, the network manager of Nederland 1, Marcel Peek, believed that the program should end. He thought that the guests were not always good enough and that too few episodes were made per year. On 19 December, after thirteen years and over 150 episodes, the last episode aired. In December 2009, RTL Boulevard announced that commercial broadcaster RTL was interested in the program, and there were talks about the continuation of the show by RTL. On 5 June 2010 eventually, RTL broadcast a single test episode that was dedicated to the Dutch general election. As a result of its success, RTL started broadcasting new episodes as of 20 May 2011. Since Van der Wal was busy working on other shows, Thomas Acda resumed his role as a team captain. In 2014, Raoul Heertje and Thomas Acda decided to leave Dit was het nieuws. They were replaced by comedians Martijn Koning and Daniël Arends.

In 2017, the show returned to the AVROTROS, broadcast on NPO 1, with team captains Jan Jaap van der Wal and Peter Pannekoek.
