= Peter Pannekoek =

Dutch comedian

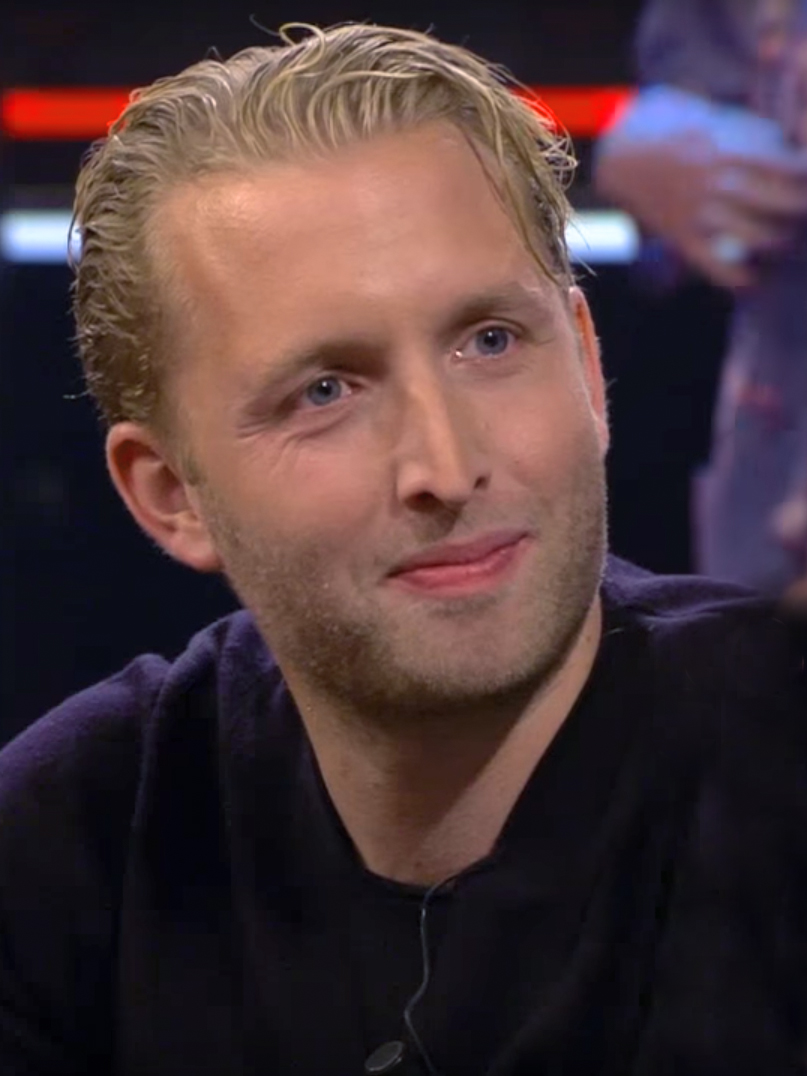
- Peter Pannekoek in 2017.
- Born: 30 June 1986 (age 40); Hilversum, Netherlands
- Parent(s): Jop Pannekoek; Katleen Warners

Comedy career
- Years active: 2006 - present
- Genres: Comedian presenter

Peter Pannekoek (born 30 June 1986) is a Dutch comedian and presenter. He is best known for his participation in the Dutch version of the Comedy Central Roast and for his role as team captain in the television program Dit was het nieuws.

== Biography ==
Peter Pannekoek was born on 30 June 1986 in Hilversum. His father Jop Pannekoek (1943 – 2003) was a director of television programs, including the television programs of the duo Van Kooten en De Bie. His mother Kathleen Warners (1954) was former Head of Entertainment at the public broadcaster VARA and is currently a film reviewer for the weekly Saar Magazine. After primary school, he went to the Comenius College in Hilversum, where he also obtained his diploma.

=== Career ===
In 2006, his career as a comedian began, after he won the Amsterdam Kleinkunst Festival Comedy Concours. In 2007 he joined the comedy company Comedytrain. From 2014 to 2016 Peter Pannekoek had a weekly column in the talk show De Wereld Draait Door, where he ended the week in a humorous way.

In 2015, Pannekoek made his theatre debut with the performance Zacht van binnen. In 2016, he was seen in the Comedy Central Roast of Gordon. Later he became a regular face at the Roast. In 2017, he participated in the Roast of Giel Beelen. In 2018, he participated in the Comedy Central Roast again, this time the Roast of Johnny de Mol. He also wrote columns for the radio program Spijkers met Koppen and has been team captain in the satirical television program Dit was het nieuws, the Dutch version of Have I Got News For You, since 2017.

Peter Pannekoek in De Wereld Draait Door about his show Later was alles beter (2018).

In 2018, Pannekoek collaborated on the satirical sketch program Klikbeet. That same year, his show Later was alles beter premiered. The show received a lot of praise and good reviews. In 2019, the tour of the show was extended and the show received the Neerlands Hoop, the award for best cabaret show. Later that year, he was team captain in the BNNVARA television program Sterke verhalen, the Dutch version of Would I Lie To You?.

In 2021, Peter Pannekoek was allowed to do the oudejaarsconference. Due to the corona pandemic, his conference was recorded twice, one version with an audience and one version without an audience. The conference was broadcast on December 31, 2021, by BNNVARA and reached more than 4 million viewers.

Since 2022, Peter Pannekoek has been touring with his show DNA, which received many positive reviews. In December 2022, he took part in the Comedy Central Roast of Famke Louise.

From 2023 to 2024, Pannekoek was the presenter of the program Waarom gaan we niet vaker?. In the program, he tries to convince people to go to the theater and promotes various theater performances. Since 2024 is Waarom gaan we niet vaker? a section in the talk show Eva by journalist Eva Jinek and Peter visits her every month to promote a theatre performance.

In 2025, Peter Pannekoek will give the oudejaarsconference for broadcaster BNNVARA for the second time.

== Theater performances ==
- Zacht van binnen (2015 – 2017)
- Later was alles beter (2018 – 2020)
- DNA (2022 – 2024)

== Television ==
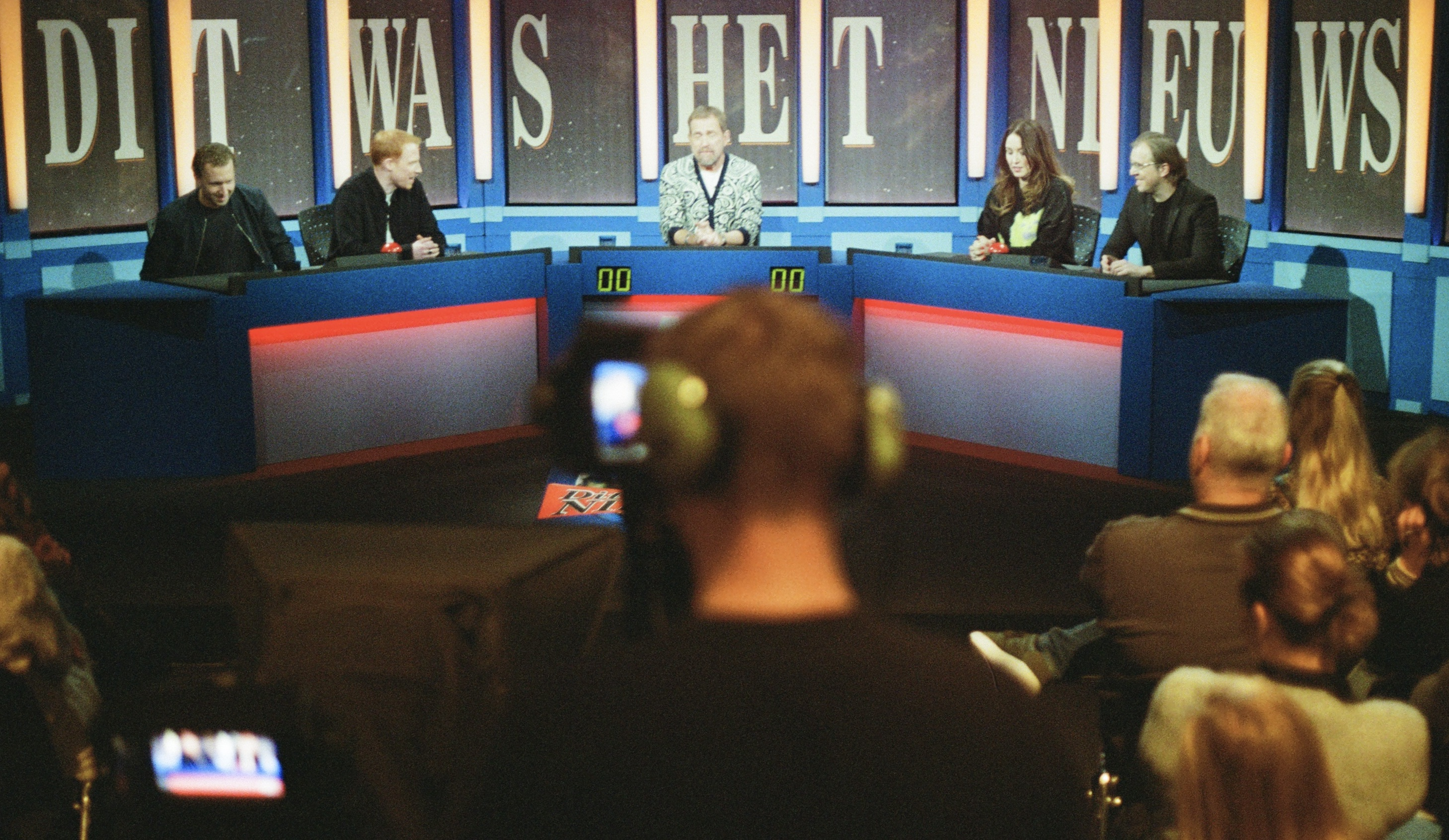
Peter Pannekoek (first from left) as team captain in Dit was het nieuws (2023).

- VARA: De Wereld Draait Door (2014 – 2016)
- Comedy Central: Comedy Central Roast of Gordon (2016)
- AVROTROS: Dit was het nieuws (2017 – present)
- Comedy Central: Comedy Central Roast of Giel Beelen (2017)
- NTR: Klikbeet (2018 - 2020)
- Comedy Central: Comedy Central Roast of Johnny de Mol (2018)
- BNNVARA: Sterke verhalen (2019)
- BNNVARA: Avond van de Filmmuziek (2019)
- BNNVARA: Oudejaarsconference Nieuw Bloed (2021)
- NTR: Het Sinterklaasjournaal (2022)
- Comedy Central: Comedy Central Roast of Famke Louise (2022)
- AVROTROS: Waarom gaan we niet vaker? (2023 – 2024)
- AVROTROS: Gouden Televizier-Ring Gala 2023 (2023)
- AVROTROS: Eva (2024 – present)
- AVROTROS: Gouden Televizier-Ring Gala 2024 (2024)

== Radio ==
- VARA: Spijkers met Koppen (2016 – 2017)

== Prizes ==
- Neerlands Hoop (2019)
- Poelifinario (2023)
