= Thomas Acda =

Dutch singer, actor and comedian

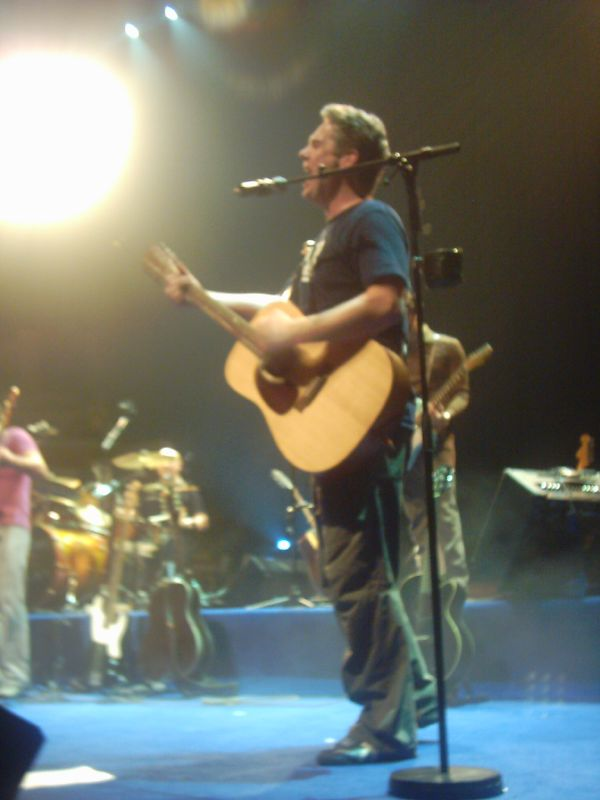

Background information
- Born: 6 March 1967 (age 58); Amsterdam, Netherlands
- Occupation(s): Singer, actor
- Years active: 1993–present
- Labels: Universal Music Group
- Formerly of: Acda en De Munnik

Thomas Acda (born Amsterdam, 6 March 1967) is a Dutch singer, actor and comedian, known as a member of the duo Acda en De Munnik.

Acda grew up in De Rijp. After graduating high school at havo level, Acda started the theater school, but soon switched to the Kleinkunstacademie in Amsterdam. There he met Paul de Munnik. They finished school in 1993 with a joint project for which they were awarded the Pisuisse-prize. After that they split up and went their own way.

In 1995, Acda en De Munnik came together again to make a theater show with the name Zwerf'On. The show was a success, and they were asked to put the songs from the show on CD. From that moment on, Acda en the Munnik were involved in both music and theater productions.

Acda was active on several projects. He was in the band Herman en Ik. He played in the television show In voor en tegenspoed. He was in the comedy redaction of the show Spijkers (later: Kopspijkers). Together with comedians Raoul Heertje and Harm Edens he was member of the panel in Dit was het nieuws (the Dutch version of Have I Got News for You) for several seasons.

From 1997 on he played in several films, All stars, The missing link and Lek. For the soundtrack of the movie All Stars, the song Als Het Vuur Gedoofd Is from Acda en de Munnik was used. The film was a success in the Netherlands, so the VARA decided to turn it into a series, in which Acda starred as goalkeeper Willem. Every episode started with the song "Groen als gras" from Acda en De Munnik.

== Filmography ==
- In Het Belang Van De Staat, 1997
- All Stars, 1997
- Fl. 19,99, 1998
- Madelief: Krassen in het Tafelblad, 1998
- Missing Link
- Lek, 2000
- In Oranje, 2004
- De Scheepsjongens van Bontekoe, 2007
- Alles is liefde, 2007
- Lover of Loser, 2009
- Penoza (season 1),2010
- All Stars 2: Old Stars (2011)
- Flikken Maastricht, (2010–2013)
- De Zevende Hemel (2016)
