= C'est la vie (Claude song) =

2025 song by Claude

Single by Claude

from the EP The Singles Collection
- Language: French; English
- English title: "That's Life"
- Released: 27 February 2025
- Recorded: November 2024
- Genre: Dance-pop
- Length: 2:40
- Label: Cloud 9
- Songwriters: Arno Krabman; Claude Kiambe; Joren van der Voort; Léon Paul Palmen
- Producers: Arno Krabman; Joren van der Voort

Claude singles chronology
"Je t'aime" (2024)	"C'est la vie" (2025)	"Amour" (2025)

Music video
- "C'est la vie" on YouTube

Eurovision Song Contest 2025 entry
- Country: Netherlands
- Artist: Claude
- Languages: French, English
- Composers: Arno Krabman; Claude Kiambe; Joren van der Voort; Léon Paul Palmen
- Lyricists: Arno Krabman; Claude Kiambe; Joren van der Voort; Léon Paul Palmen

Finals performance
- Semi-final result: 3rd
- Semi-final points: 121
- Final result: 12th
- Final points: 175

Entry chronology
- ◄ "Europapa" (2024)

"C'est la vie" (French pronunciation: [s‿ɛ la vi]; transl. "That's life") is a song by Congolese-born Dutch singer-songwriter Claude. Described as a tribute to one's parents, the song was released on 27 February 2025 through Cloud 9. It was written by Claude, together with Arno Krabman, Joren van der Voort, and Léon Paul Palmen. The song represented the Netherlands in the Eurovision Song Contest 2025. It reached number one on the Dutch Top 40.

== Background and composition ==
"C'est la vie" was written and composed by Claude, Arno Krabman, Joren van der Voort, and Léon Paul Palmen, with the latter two producing the song. Claude described the song as a tribute to a parent, specifically his mother. He explained, "From my childhood through my youth, she taught me to find the positive in life’s experiences, even during setbacks." Reflecting on the song's message, he added, "Even when things seem dark, it’s important to focus on the brighter side. This is the message I aim to convey—life isn’t always easy; it has its ups, downs, and twists, but 'C’est la vie'!"

== Eurovision Song Contest 2025 ==
=== Internal selection ===
The Netherlands' broadcaster for the Eurovision Song Contest, AVROTROS, announced its intention to participate in the Eurovision Song Contest 2025 on 23 October 2024, confirming an internal selection after the 2024 Dutch representative Joost Klein declined its offer to represent the Netherlands for a second consecutive time.

On 19 December 2024, AVROTROS announced that it had selected Claude to represent the Netherlands at the 2025 contest. The selection of Claude as the Dutch representative was carried out by a committee consisting of singers Jacqueline Govaert and Jaap Reesema, radio DJs Carolien Borgers, Hila Noorzai and Sander Lantinga, and television host and author Cornald Maas, following a final audition round featuring a shortlist of six acts, including singers Judith van Hirtum and Paul Morris, that took place on 9 December 2024.

=== At Eurovision ===
The Eurovision Song Contest 2025 took place at St. Jakobshalle in Basel, Switzerland, and consisted of two semi-finals held on the respective dates of 13 and 15 May and the final on 17 May 2025. During the allocation draw held on 28 January 2025, the Netherlands was drawn to compete in the first semi-final, performing in the second half of the show. Claude was later drawn to perform 13th, ahead of Albania's Shkodra Elektronike and before Croatia's Marko Bošnjak.

For its Eurovision performance, the staging is being led by the creative director Pim Brassien and lighting designer Henk-Jan van Beek. Emma Evelein was also appointed as the choreographer. The song qualified for the grand final.

Claude performed a repeat of his performance in the grand final on 17 May, with the song performed 12th, after Latvia's Tautumeitas and before Finland's Erika Vikman.

== Track listing ==
Digital download/streaming

1. "C'est la vie" – 2:40

7-inch vinyl

1. "C'est la vie" – 2:40
2. "C'est la vie (Instrumental)" – 2:36

== Awards and nominations ==
Awards and nominations for "C'est la vie"
Year	Award	Category	Result	Ref.
2025	OUTmusic Award	Eurovision Song of the Year	Third place	

== Charts ==
=== Weekly charts ===
Weekly chart performance for "C'est la vie"
Chart (2025)	Peak position
Austria (Ö3 Austria Top 40)	63
Belgium (Ultratop 50 Flanders)	49
Finland (Suomen virallinen lista)	44
Iceland (Tónlistinn)	13
Greece International (IFPI)	14
Lithuania (AGATA)	13
Netherlands (Dutch Top 40)	1
Netherlands (Single Top 100)	2
Norway (VG-lista)	67
Sweden (Sverigetopplistan)	53
Switzerland (Schweizer Hitparade)	23
UK Indie Breakers (OCC)	17
UK Singles Downloads (Official Charts)	52
UK Singles Sales (OCC)	55

=== Year-end charts ===
Year-end chart performance for "C'est la vie"
Chart (2025)	Position
Netherlands (Dutch Top 40)	23
Netherlands (Single Top 100)	43

== Certifications ==
Certifications for "C'est la vie"
Region	Certification	Certified units/sales
Netherlands (NVPI)	Gold	46,500^{‡}
^{‡} Sales+streaming figures based on certification alone.

== Release history ==
Release dates and formats for "C'est la vie"
Region	Date	Format(s)	Version	Label	Ref.
Various	27 February 2025	Digital download; streaming	Original	Cloud 9	
Italy	7 March 2025	Radio airplay	Original	Warner Music Italy	
Various	11 April 2025	7"	Original; instrumental	Cloud 9	
