= Raoul Heertje =

Dutch comedian (born 1963)

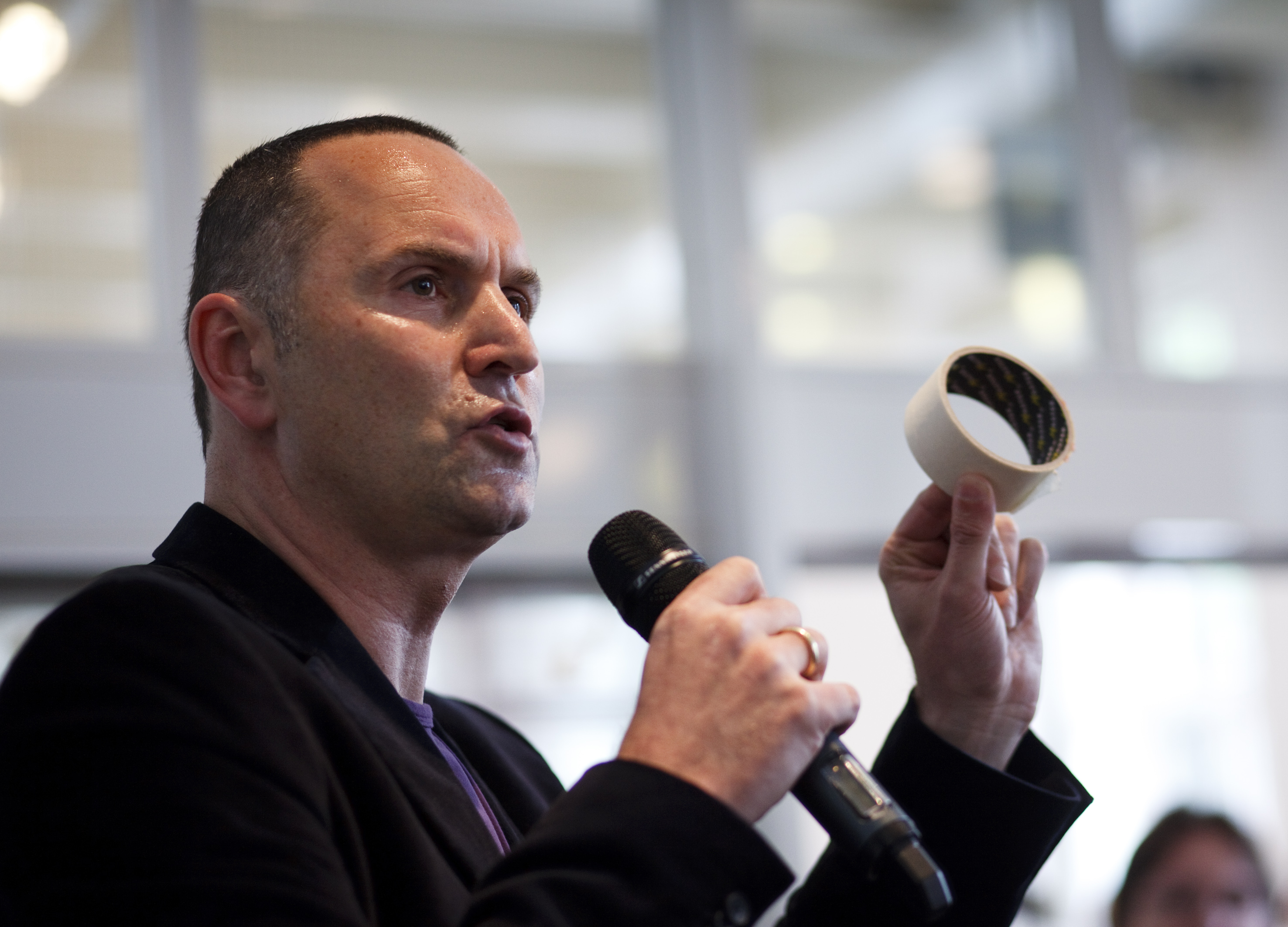
- Raoul Heertje in 2010
- Born: Raoul Louis Heertje; 11 March 1963 (age 63); Bussum, Netherlands

Comedy career
- Years active: 1990–present
- Medium: Stand-up, television

Raoul Louis Heertje (Dutch pronunciation: [raːˈʋul ˈɦeːrtɕə, raːˈʔul -]; born 11 March 1963) is a Dutch comedian. Being Jewish himself, his comedy performances include Jewish humour.

== Biography ==
From 1983 till 1984 Heertje studied International Relations and Theatre Studies at the Hebrew University of Jerusalem. After that he studied in Birmingham till 1986.

He appeared on the TV shows of Ruby Wax, Clive James, Jeremy Clarkson and in the British satirical programme Have I Got News for You (on series 9) in 1995. A year later he became a panelist in the successful Dutch version of the same show: Dit was het nieuws.

Raoul, and his brother Eric, founded comedyclub Toomler and Comedytrain, the stand-up comedy collective that introduced stand-up comedy in the Netherlands in the year 1990. In 2007 he is one of the members of The Amsterdam Underground Comedy Collective.

Heertje also wrote columns for Het Parool.

His father is the economist Arnold Heertje.

== Comedytrain ==
In 1990, Raoul founded Comedytrain (combination of "Comedy" + "Training"), which was the first stand-up comedy collective in the Netherlands. With Comedy Club Toomler as its home theater, Comedytrain acted as a training ground for new comedians, providing a space for them to practice and exchange feedback with peers.

Notable members of Comedytrain include Hans Teeuwen, Theo Maassen, Najib Amhali, Hans Sibbel, Thomas Acda, Ronald Goedemondt, Jan Jaap van der Wal, and Sanne Wallis de Vries.

As of 2026, Comedytrain is still active; it accepts new members and hosts events such as a weekly Open Mic.
