= Triffic Films =

Triffic Films was a British animation company, based in Stony Stratford, a constituent town of Milton Keynes, Buckinghamshire, England.

Productions of note include I Am Not an Animal, 2DTV and various title sequences including Two Fat Ladies, The Catherine Tate Show and Have I Got News for You.

In November 2009, the company was merged into Baby Cow Productions, an independent comedy production company based in London.
