= Have I Got News for You =

British television panel show

- Also known as: HIGNFY; Have I Got a Little Bit More News for You; Have I Got a Bit More News for You; Have I Got Old News for You; Have I Got a Bit More Old News for You
- Genre: Comedy panel game; Political satire
- Created by: Jimmy Mulville
- Presented by: Angus Deayton; Guest presenters
- Starring: Ian Hislop; Paul Merton
- Theme music composer: Big George
- Country of origin: United Kingdom
- Original language: English
- No. of series: 72
- No. of episodes: 668 (list of episodes)

Production
- Production locations: The London Studios (1990–2017); Elstree Studios (2018–2019); Riverside Studios (2020–)
- Running time: 29 minutes; 42 minutes (extended)
- Production company: Hat Trick Productions

Original release
- Network: BBC Two
- Release: 28 September 1990 – 2 June 2000
- Network: BBC One
- Release: 20 October 2000 – present

Have I Got News for You (HIGNFY) is a British television panel show, produced by Hat Trick Productions for the BBC, which premiered on 28 September 1990. It focuses on two teams, one captained by Ian Hislop and one by Paul Merton, plus a guest panellist on each answering questions on various news stories on the week prior to an episode's broadcast. The programme's format focuses more on the topical discussions on the subject of the news stories related to questions, and the satirical humour derived from these by the teams. This style of presentation had a profound impact on panel shows in British TV comedy, making it one of the genre's key standard-bearers.

The programme aired on BBC Two for its first ten years, before moving to BBC One in 2000. Until 2002, it was hosted by Angus Deayton, who was sacked following reports in national newspapers of several scandals about his private life. Since then, it has been hosted by a different celebrity each week; many of them add their own comedy. While the standard episodes are broadcast on Fridays, since 2003 extended versions of each episode, initially titled Have I Got a Little Bit More News for You and later simply Have I Got a Bit More News for You, have been broadcast, originally on the following Saturdays on BBC Two, and later moved to the Mondays of the following week on BBC One. The Monday repeats of Series 70 were standard 29-minute episodes until Programme 6, since when both broadcasts were extended to around 34 minutes in duration. Repeats of older episodes are named Have I Got Old News for You or Have I Got a Bit More Old News for You. As of 2026, only episodes from series 66 onwards are available on BBC iPlayer.

A series is broadcast roughly over the second and fourth quarter of each year, and the programme has gained widespread acclaim for its contribution to British television and comedy. It has received multiple awards at the British Comedy Awards including Best New Comedy Programme in 1991, Best Entertainment Series in 1992, Best Comedy Gameshow in 1999 and the Lifetime Achievement Award in 2011. It also received the 2016 BAFTA Television Award for Comedy and Comedy Entertainment Programme.

== History ==
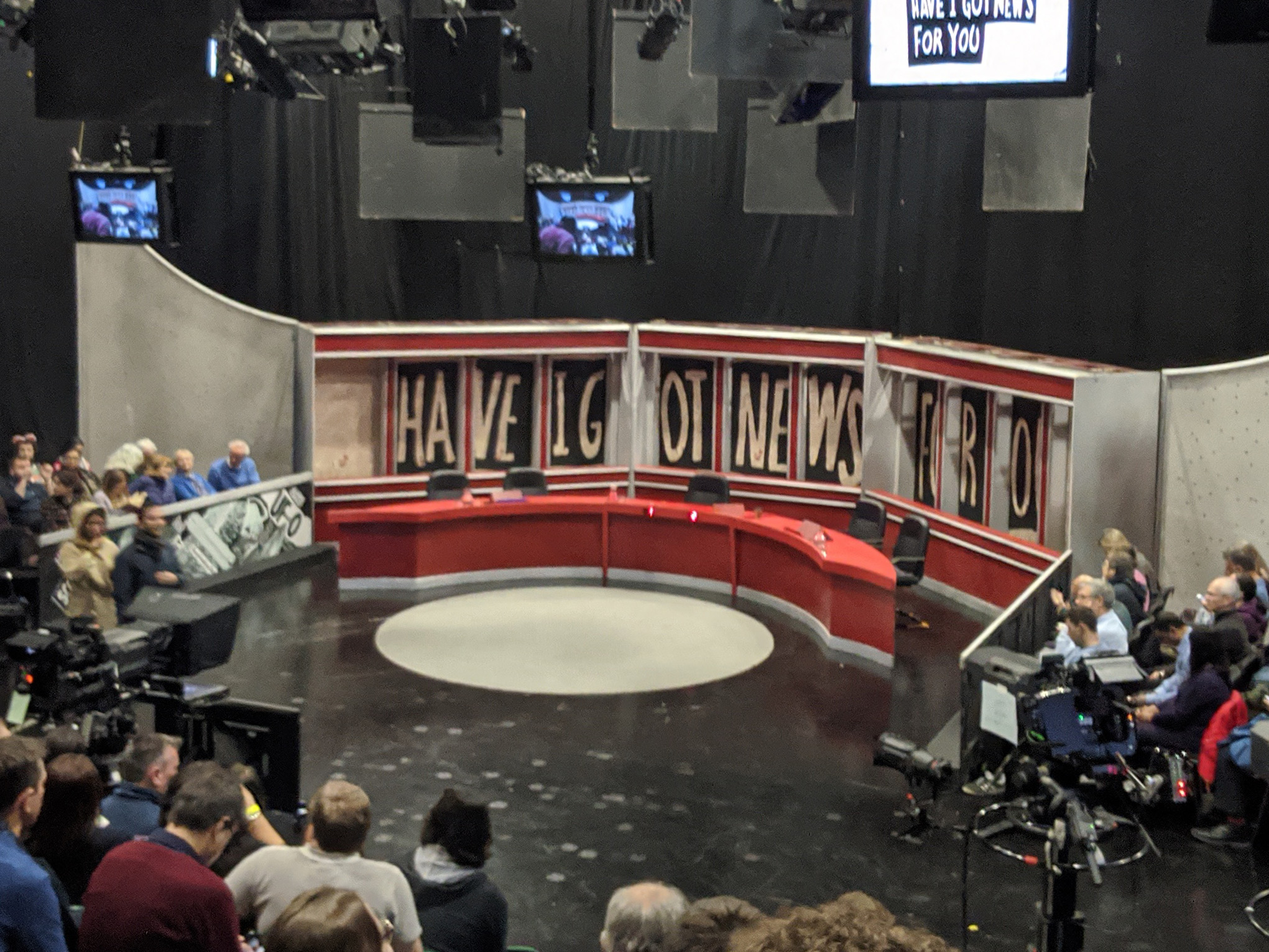
The Have I Got News for You studio

Have I Got News for You was initially conceived as a pilot for the BBC called John Lloyd's Newsround. The BBC had commissioned Hat Trick Productions to make a television show which was like a more topical version of Hat Trick's Whose Line Is It Anyway? (developed by future Mock the Week creators Dan Patterson and Mark Leveson), but it was decided that the show would follow a template more in keeping with Radio 4's The News Quiz. Hat Trick hired a producer with a track record in radio comedy, John Lloyd, and filmed a pilot with a title which aped long-running Children's BBC programme John Craven's Newsround.

After filming the pilot, John Lloyd decided not to proceed as chairman, and the job fell to comedian Angus Deayton, after try-outs with future News Quiz host Sandi Toksvig and a pre-fame Chris Evans in the main role. The team captains – Ian Hislop, editor of Private Eye and a staff writer for Spitting Image, and Paul Merton, comedian and Whose Line Is It Anyway? cast member – returned from the pilot.

Since its first broadcast on 28 September 1990, the BBC has commissioned two series each year, the number of episodes being divided between the Spring series, broadcast from April to June, and the Autumn series, shown from October to December. The Autumn series takes a week's break to make room for the Children in Need special. For the first ten years of its existence, the programme was shown on BBC Two. Hislop has been the longest-serving member of the three on the programme since its premiere. He has not missed a single episode. Merton took a break during the 11th series in 1996, saying he had become "very tired" of the show and thought it had become "stuck in a rut". In his absence, his role was assigned to a guest team captain each episode, with Merton himself returning for one episode as a guest on Hislop's team. Merton returned for the following series as team captain, deeming that his absence had given the programme the "shot in the arm" it needed and that it had been "better ever since". (Note: The Very Best of Have I Got News for You (2002): DVD commentary)

By 2000, the BBC made a decision to relocate its late evening news bulletin from nine o'clock to ten o'clock, after ITV moved their long-running ten o'clock bulletin to eleven o'clock. The resulting move caused a gap in its schedule that needed filling; Have I Got News for You was moved to BBC One and given access to a broader audience in October that year. In 2002, Deayton was caught using illegal drugs and soliciting sex with a prostitute – a fact that he was ridiculed for on the programme, after it became headlines – putting his private life under scrutiny by news media outlets. Further scandal effectively forced the BBC to terminate Deayton's contract with them two episodes into the programme's 24th series.

At short notice, Merton hosted the first episode after Deayton's departure, with a series of guest hosts appearing for the remainder of the series, including Anne Robinson, Boris Johnson, and Jeremy Clarkson. Despite an initial search for a permanent successor to Deayton, having a different guest host each week proved successful, with average audience figures increasing from 6 million to 7 million, leading to it becoming a permanent feature in the programme's format in June 2003.

Between 1990 and its spring series in 2018, the programme was recorded at The London Studios, the former home of London Weekend Television; it briefly was recorded at BBC Television Centre for a 2001 Election special, the Friday after the elections were completed. From the 2018 autumn series, recording was conducted at Elstree Studios, although the onset of the COVID-19 pandemic in the United Kingdom in 2020 impacted production of series during that time. The spring series saw Hislop, Merton, and the celebrities for each episode filming episodes virtually from their own homes, against a superimposed CGI recreation of the studio.

The 2020 autumn, 2021 spring, and 2021 autumn series were filmed at Riverside Studios in London under safety measures to prevent the spread of infection, which included socially distancing panellists and host with screens while on set. Initially audience numbers were reduced – half those attending each recording being allowed in the studio, and the other half watching the recording in the studio's cinema – but upon the British government implementing a second lockdown, all remaining episodes in the series were recorded with a virtual audience. After the easing of restrictions filming continued to take place at Riverside Studios.

== Format ==
Episodes are usually set to around 30 minutes in length and are edited from the footage taken from a longer recording session the day before an episode is broadcast. The time frame given is used to allow the programme to retain the topical elements that an episode will feature, while allowing for any potentially defamatory material to be cut by the BBC's team of lawyers to avoid legal issues. The focus on each episode is on four panellists – the show's two regulars, and two guests – split between two teams, answering questions related to topical items in the news that occurred within the previous week, but the format often forgoes this aspect and the scoring system in favour of the panellists' witty exchanges, jokes, and satirical discussions on the question's relevant news item.

Each episode consists of a general format that is largely unchanged since the programme first premiered. All begin with an introduction by the host, who gives out a set of satirical, fictional comedic news stories that are often accompanied with a photograph or video clip from news programmes or general public recordings to provide the joke, followed by introductions of the episode's guest panellists. After this, the episode focuses on four rounds that generally follow the same arrangement:

- Round 1 – dubbed "The Bigger News Stories of the Week" – begins after the introductions and sees each team being shown a collection of video clips – all featuring no sounds – consisting of news reports, archive footage and dramatised scenes, and must detail the news story that they have relevance to. The item in question tends to be a major news story, and avoids any notable pieces that consist of tragic events such as terrorist attacks that would be deemed offensive to use for comedic purposes. The round usually includes additional questions and sometimes a bonus round for comedic purposes. On some occasions the round has had some deviations in arrangement, such as a team being given a series of audio clips with no pictures and identifying the news item it was focused on.
- Round 2 focuses on discussions and questions on other news items. Between 1990 and 2004, the questions focused on newspaper headlines that panellists had to identify the story it was linked to. After 2004, the round focused on images that would be revealed to panellists in different manners, which they had to reveal the story about – in this arrangement, the programme frequently made use of props and graphic effects to reveal such images, with the round being labelled per the manner the picture was revealed, and include: "Jigsaw of News" – image revealed in jigsaw pieces; the "One-Armed Bandit of News" – picture revealed on slot machine reels, with the host pulling a lever to spin them; and the "Strengthometer of News" – host uses a mallet to hit a high striker pad, with the meter stopping at an image that is then enlarged.
- Round 3 focuses on panellists given four personalities, characters and/or objects, in which they must define the link that connects three of these, and point out the item that is the odd one out in this regard. The number of "odd one outs" that are given in the round vary depending on what production staff arrange, but usually consist of a single question.
- Round 4 focuses on a headline from newspapers and a guest publication, in which a choice selection of words is blanked out, and the panellists must suggest what these could be. More often than not, the panellists never give the right answer, and the round is mainly focused on what comedic line could be spun from the headline, based on what words are left visible. For example, a comedian could fill in the blank for the following – "Church may be forced to sell _____" – with something that would be considered highly unlikely and bizarre to read about.

After the rounds are completed, the host then gives out the scores, denoting which team is the winner. If time permits, the episode may feature a bonus round called the "Caption Competition", in which panellists are given a single or two pictures to make amusing captions to. The episode always concludes with the host making an additional set of satirical, fictional comedic news stories, accompanied by a picture to provide the joke; in rare cases, a video clip is used.

A repeat with a running time of 40 minutes, titled Have I Got a Bit More News for You, is aired on the following Monday, which features additional content not shown in the original episode, often including scenes and outtakes made during the recording which are shown before the opening titles or after the end credits. This practice ended with series 70 in October 2025.

=== Participants ===
The format of Have I Got News for You is derived from the comedy that can be generated by each guest that participates in the programme, whether as a panellist or as a host. Although the show features a variety of comedians, it has also included politicians, television personalities, actors and news media personalities, several of whom have appeared more than once. Alexander Armstrong has appeared most often as guest host, while Andy Hamilton has appeared most often as a guest panellist.

On rare occasions, the programme has had a participant cancel or otherwise be unable to appear. Production staff try to find a replacement, but this is often challenging at short notice. For an episode in 1993, nobody could find a suitable replacement for Roy Hattersley (then an MP, having recently stepped down as Deputy Leader of the Labour Party) after he pulled out at the last minute; he had cancelled on two prior occasions. He was replaced by a tub of lard; the programme's host compared Hattersley to the tub of lard, claiming that "they possessed the same qualities and were liable to give similar performances". It was credited as "The Rt. Hon Tub of Lard MP".

In 2019, panellist Johnny Mercer stated Ian Hislop was paid £20,000 per episode. Guests are paid varying amounts to appear on the show. Jacob Rees-Mogg's Parliamentary register of interests showed him earning £1,500 for a claimed four hours' work, while Nick Clegg was paid £15,000 to host an episode.

=== Theme tune ===
The show's theme tune was composed by session musician and radio DJ, Big George "on a train on the way to the recording studio" and was recorded in ten minutes. It replaced at short notice one written for initial planned host, John Lloyd.

== Criticism, controversy and litigation ==
Throughout its broadcast history, Have I Got News for You has drawn considerable criticism from guests, politicians and viewers about its content, sometimes ending in court.

- In 1994, an episode included a joke about Ian and Kevin Maxwell, who were awaiting trial. The joke purported to be about a crackdown by the BBC on references to the Maxwells, before ending on the line "these two heartless, scheming bastards". The nature of the joke became the subject of a case in the High Court against the BBC and Hat Trick Productions, which found both guilty of contempt of court and fined each of them £10,000.
- In January 1998, BBC Worldwide and Hat Trick Productions successfully defended a libel case brought by Conservative MP Rupert Allason, after a book based on the autumn series, titled Have I Got 1997 for You, contained a remark about the politician being "a conniving little shit".
- In November 1998, producers ridiculed a BBC edict restricting reporting about Peter Mandelson by mocking it throughout filming of an episode that was broadcast without any elements being edited out. The edict was put in place when Mandelson phoned the BBC and PCC after being to the "outed" by Matthew Parris on BBC Newsnight. The programme continued to ridicule, ignore and flout the reporting edict – alongside several other shows – before the BBC relaxed it two years later.
- In April 2003, three-time guest panellist Stephen Fry announced that he was boycotting the show following the sacking of Angus Deayton. Fry described Deayton's disposal as "greasy, miserable, British and pathetic".
- In November 2007, Ann Widdecombe criticised the programme for the involvement of Jimmy Carr as Hislop's teammate, vowing not to appear again after admitting she nearly "walked out" because of the comedian's risqué material during recording.
- The following week, Will Self, a frequent guest, announced he would not return. His reasons focused on the programme becoming more "like any other pseudo-panel contest, where funny fellows sit behind desks cracking jokes", criticising the BBC for cutting a joke he made despite the fact it was well-received by the audience.
- In April 2013, the programme received more than 100 complaints for an episode that involved discussions on a news article on Scottish independence. The focus of the complaints was on comments deemed to promote anti-Scottish sentiment, made by Hislop and by guest host Ray Winstone, who joked that the Scottish economy relied chiefly on exporting "oil, whisky, tartan and tramps" and encouraged the audience to vote for "...them to bugger off".
- In April 2018, producers received backlash from several female comedians over the lack of gender equality, following comments made by Hislop and Merton during an interview for the Radio Times, in regard to how production staff approached several prominent women for the role of guest host.
- In May 2019, the BBC had to postpone an episode as it featured Heidi Allen, then leader of the political party Change UK, who was standing in that month's European elections; it was broadcast the following month.
- In September 2026, the BBC upheld complaints about an episode from the previous November, in which host Katherine Ryan likened Victoria Beckham to a "cunt". Ryan's joke was removed from the BBC iPlayer.

== Home media ==
The series has seen many releases on VHS and DVD, mainly consisting of straight-to-video compilations from other seasons. They were all released by Hat Trick through Video Collection International/2Entertain, under licence from the BBC.

- Have I Got News for You, Volume 1 (1993) was a compilation that contained clips from the first five series plus the complete 1992 election night special. It was also released on Video CD.
- Have I Got Unbroadcastable News for You (1995) consisted of a special straight-to-video episode of the series featuring guests Eddie Izzard, Richard Wilson, and a surprise appearance from Germaine Greer.
- Classic Battles & Bust-Ups (1996) featured three full-length episodes featuring the Tub of Lard, Paula Yates and Germaine Greer, among others.
- Have I Got News for You: The Official Pirate Video (1997) was another special straight-to-video episode, featuring guests Martin Clunes and Neil Morrissey. (Note: Hat Trick Productions: VHS VC6587.)
- The Very Best of Have I Got News for You (2002) was a compilation release of highlights from the first 12 years of the show, from the beginning up until the episode made after Deayton hit the tabloids. The main feature is three hours long, with the DVD release also containing many extras, including, among other things, a running commentary of the main feature by Merton and Hislop. Other extra content featured includes a clip of Terry Wogan on fellow Hat Trick series Room 101 nominating the programme as one of his pet hates, alongside interviews with political figures (taken from the Channel 4 Politics Awards) revealing their opinions on the series.
- Have I Got News for You: The Best of the Guest Presenters (2003) is another compilation release. The main feature included several episodes from the series, including a half-hour cut of Boris Johnson's first guest-hosted episode. Episodes with Martin Clunes, William Hague and Bruce Forsyth as chairman were also included, as well as a compilation of clips taken from other editions from the first two series with guest hosts (with only the episode hosted by Liza Tarbuck not represented). The DVD release also included a bonus disc, "The Full Boris", which showed a far longer cut of the same episode (lasting slightly under 60 minutes), alongside several other extra features, including a discussion between Paul Merton and Boris Johnson regarding Johnson's appearance as presenter, filmed during his appearance as the celebrity guest on Room 101.
- Have I Got News for You: The Best of the Guest Presenters Vol. 2 (2005) is nearer in content to the first "Best of" DVD compilation than its direct predecessor, consisting of four 45-minute compilations of the Autumn 2003, Spring 2004, Autumn 2004 and Spring 2005 series. The bonus disc contains an 80-minute uncut version of Boris Johnson's second guest-hosted episode, alongside a bonus mini-feature called "The A to Z of HIGNFY". On it, each letter is used to stand for a different term or name often associated with the show, each highlighted by various example clips – except for the "problem letters" of X, Y and Z, which just lead into a selection of random outtakes. This feature also includes some behind-the-scenes content, with Marcus Brigstocke guiding the viewer around the studio and backstage, on a recording night.

== Internet spin-offs ==
During the late 1990s, the website haveigotnewsforyou.com, run in association with Freeserve, featured interactive versions of the show's games, including the missing words round and the caption competition, offering prizes.

Have I Got News for You started broadcasting a video podcast, The Inevitable Internet Spin-off, on 13 April 2007. It was initially planned to run for six series, from series 33 to 38, taking it to the end of 2009.

From the beginning of Series 37, an internet feature, Have I Got News for You, News... for You, was introduced. A short programme featuring typical opening and closing sequences (without the presence of a live audience) as well as other short sketches, it was presented by Alexander Armstrong, and ran fortnightly, bridging the gap between series 37 and 38.

On 1 October 2009, the last "webisode" episode was made available via both the BBC iPlayer and YouTube.

== Other shows based on the Have I Got News for You format ==
Shows based on the Have I Got News for You format are broadcast in other countries:

- American weekly radio show Wait Wait... Don't Tell Me! was started in 1998 on public radio network NPR. Based in Chicago, the show follows a similar format, but with three individual panellists competing to win. They play some of the same games including fill in the missing headline, however many TV games have to be excluded due to their visual nature. Frequently the same stories are covered on both Wait Wait and Have I Got News for You. Differences include: listeners calling in to win mini games, and a celebrity interview and quiz in the middle of the show. Wait Wait is more closely related to The News Quiz which is also the inspiration for Have I Got News for You.
- Comedian Roy Wood Jr. began hosting an American version of the show for CNN in September 2024. It was initially commissioned for a ten-episode run, with Amber Ruffin and Michael Ian Black as team captains. Black had previously served as a team captain for a pilot episode produced by NBC on 20 November 2009, with host Sam Seder and opposing team captain Greg Giraldo. Two other pilot versions of the show had been made in the US prior to its CNN run, commissioned by cable channels Bravo and TBS.
- Dutch comedian Raoul Heertje appeared on the original Have I Got News for You in May 1995. A year later he became team captain in the newly launched Dutch version of the show: Dit was het nieuws ("This was the news"). On 19 December 2009, the last episode was broadcast. RTL ran new episodes between June 2010 and October 2015; in December 2017, the show returned to the public broadcaster AVROTROS. Harm Edens has been host since its launch in 1996. Peter Pannekoek and Jan Jaap van der Wal are current team captains.
- The Finnish version called Uutisvuoto ("newsleak") was broadcast for 20 years, 1998–2018 on Yle TV1, and was one of the most popular TV shows, and also the continuously longest running TV entertainment show, in Finland. In 2019, the show continued on MTV3 with its original host Peter Nyman.
- The Estonian version, called Teletaip ("TV uptake"), was first aired in 2000 on ETV; seven series were produced. Its two main hosts were the comedian Tarmo Leinatamm and former MEP Indrek Tarand.
- The Swedish version called Snacka om nyheter ("Talk about news") was broadcast from 1995 to 2003 and 2008 to 2009.
- The Norwegian version called Nytt på nytt ("The news anew") started on NRK in 1999, and is still broadcast as of June 2025. It also became the most popular show on Norwegian TV in 2017.

== See also ==
- Triffic Films, creators of the original opening animation
