= Goldband =

Dutch pop trio

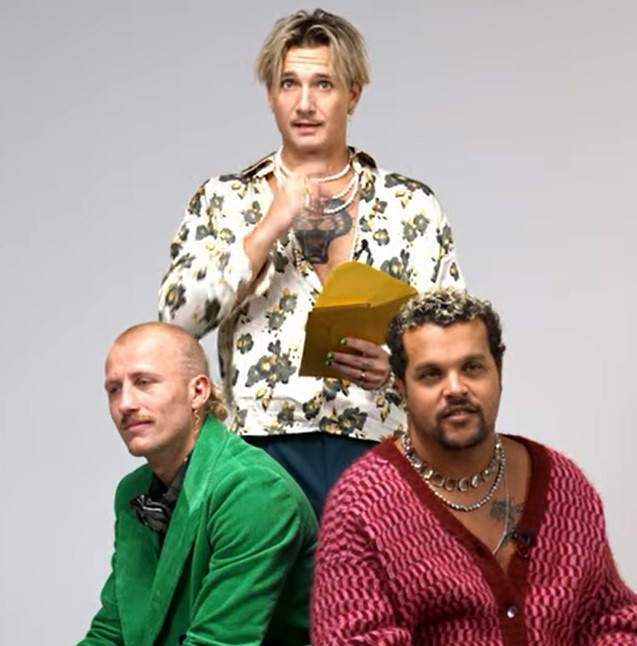
- Goldband in 2022

Background information
- Origin: The Hague, the Netherlands
- Genres: Pop; nederpop; house
- Years active: 2019–present
- Label: Platen in Platina
- Members: Boaz Kok; Karel Gerlach; Milo Driessen
- Website: goldband.wtf

Goldband is a Dutch pop trio from The Hague. The group was founded in 2019 and consists of members Boaz Kok, Karel Gerlach, and Milo Driessen in collaboration with music producer Wieger Hoogendorp.

== History ==
Gerlach studied music production and produced mainly techno music. After this, he continued with Driessen and transformed the music into the pop music of which the group later became known. Kok was the last to join the group. The name of the pop group comes from the eponymous brand of stucco plaster and thus refers to the industry in which the fathers of the band members work and in which the band members worked, as plasterers.

On 19 June 2020 Goldband was named 3FM Talent in the categories 'best group' and 'best album', for their album Betaalbare Romantiek ('Affordable Romance'). In 2022, the band gave a performance at Lowlands festival, which was considered by visitors and reviewers to be one of the best performances at that year's edition. After the performance, their songs "Witte Was" ('White Laundry') and "Noodgeval" ('Emergency'), two earlier singles of the group, entered the Dutch Single Top 100, and "Noodgeval" entered the Dutch Top 40 as well. In addition, "Noodgeval" ended up in the NPO Radio 2 Top 2000 in 2022. It came in at number 55, making it the highest new entry on the list that year. "Noodgeval" also became a hit in Flanders, with a listing in the Ultratop 50. With this, the band had their first radio hit. The album Betaalbare Romantiek also rose after their performance in the Dutch Album Top 100 and entered the Flemish Ultratop 200 Albums again. In November 2022, the band released a new song with the singer Maan titled "Stiekem". This song was named Alarmschijf at Qmusic and Megahit at NPO 3FM.

On 20 January 2023 Goldband reached the news for possible open use of cocaine during a concert on stage. Driessen responded to the issue on television programme Khalid & Sophie and said that he thought the media reacted narrow-minded. He agreed that the action was not sensible and he advised against drug use but also said that people have been using mind-altering drugs for centuries and that it was not surprising he did that now. He went on to say that it was precisely the attention of the media that exaggerated it by saying that young people saw him taking the drug, while he was only with adults at the party.

In 2023, the group received the Buma Cultuur Pop Award (Popprijs) 2022 during Eurosonic Noorderslag in Groningen. In the same year, they gave a performance at Pinkpop and at Zwarte Cross.

== Discography ==
=== Albums ===
- Van Roulette naar Doublet (2020)
- Betaalbare Romantiek (2021)
- Samen Tegen Elkaar (2024)

=== Extended plays ===
- Dun Smeren Geld Verdienen (2019)
- Rommel (2023)

=== Singles ===
- "Uber Uber" (2019)
- "Mijn Stad" (2019)
- "De Wereld" (2020)
- "Ja Ja Nee Nee" (2020)
- "Dit Is Voor Jou" (2020)
- "Tweede Kamer" (with Sophie Straat, 2021)
- "De Langste Nacht" (2021)
- "Noodgeval" (2021)
- "Kinderwens" (2021)
- "Psycho" (2022)
- "Stiekem" (with Maan, 2022)
- "You & Me" (2024)
- "Sex" (2024)

== Awards and nominations ==
=== Berlin Music Video Awards ===
The Berlin Music Video Awards is an international festival that promotes the art of music videos.

| Year | Nominated Work | Award | Result | Ref. |
|---|---|---|---|---|
| 2025 | You & Me | Best Narrative | Nominated | |
