= Acda en De Munnik =

Dutch cabaret and musical duo

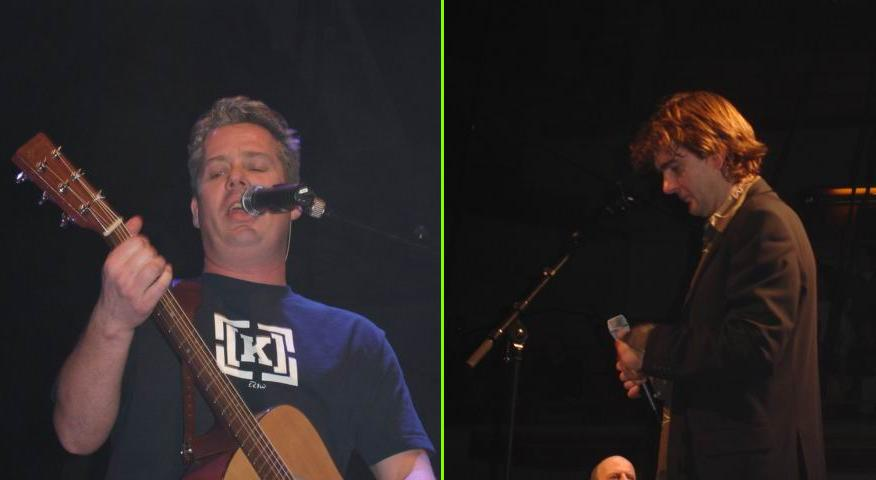
- Thomas Acda (left) and Paul de Munnik (right)

Background information
- Origin: Amsterdam, Netherlands
- Genres: Pop
- Years active: 1995–2015, 2023–present
- Labels: Columbia, S.m.a.r.t, Sony
- Spinoffs: De Poema's
- Members: Thomas Acda; Paul de Munnik
- Website: http://www.acdaendemunnik.nl/

Acda en De Munnik (Dutch pronunciation: [ˈɑɡdaː ʔɛn də ˈmʏnɪk]) is a Dutch cabaret and musical duo from Amsterdam, consisting of Thomas Acda and Paul de Munnik.

The duo's first three albums, which produced some of their most popular songs such as "Als het vuur gedood is", "Niet of nooit geweest" and "Het regent zonnestralen", originated as music for their stage productions. In the late 1990s, the duo formed the supergroup De Poema's with fellow Dutch band Van Dik Hout. In 2004, the duo released the rock opera Ren Lenny Ren, which they starred in.

The duo disbanded in 2015 before returning in 2023 with six sold-out reunion concerts at the Ziggo Dome.

== History ==
Thomas Acda and Paul de Munnik met at the Kleinkunstacademie in Amsterdam in 1989. In 1991, they made their first theater program together, Waarom zweeg Sam? (lit. 'Why was Sam silent?'). Then in 1993, their graduation production Spectacle Coupé won the Pisuisse Prize, which was given annually by the Akademie voor Kleinkunst to a student for the best production. At the same time, they played in a band named "Herman & Ik" with members such as David Middelhoff and Sander Donkers. Acda would leave the group to do theater full-time. Their first professional show was Zwerf' On in 1995.

In 1997, they released their self-titled debut album. Some of the songs came from their cabaret theater program. The singles from it such as "Als het vuur gedood is", "Lopen tot de zon komt" and "Mooi liedje" did not chart upon release but have since become nationally beloved, placing well on the annual Top 2000.

Their second album Naar Huis was released in 1998 and contained songs from the theater program Life is What Happens to You While You're Busy Making Other Plans. The lead single, "Niet of nooit geweest", became their first hit, reaching No. 2 on the Dutch Top 40 and Dutch Single Top 100. The third single from the album, "Het regent zonnestralen", was written as a sequel to "Als het vuur gedood is", telling the story of Herman who was presumed to have been dead at the end of that song. While it did not chart on the Dutch Top 40 during its release, it has since become the duo's most popular and beloved song, always being their highest song on the Top 2000.

In 1999, the duo formed the supergroup De Poema's with the Dutch pop group Van Dik Hout. Their debut single "Mijn houten hart" was a top 10 hit. Then, Acda & De Munnik returned to cabaret, with the show It's only cabaret but I like it, and its 2000 associated third studio album Hier zijn. In 2001, the De Poema's song "Ze maakt het verschil" reached No. 1 on the Dutch Top 40.

Their fourth album Groeten uit Maaiveld was released in 2002, and it was their first album that was not associated with a theater program of theirs. In 2004, they released their fifth album, Liedjes van Lenny. The material from these two albums led to the rock opera Ren Lenny Ren, which was released in 2004 and starred Dutch actress Carice van Houten but was also panned by critics. In 2005, the group released a greatest hits album Adem. They went inactive before returning in 2007, newly signed to Universal Music Group. Their fifth album Nachtmuziek was certified Gold by the NVPI after just two weeks of sales.

On 4 March 2014, Acda en De Munnik announced on the TV program De Wereld Draait Door that they were breaking up after one final farewell tour. Their last show took place on 30 March 2015 at the Royal Theater Carré in Amsterdam. Paul de Munnik initiated the split, wanting to see what he could do on his own. Acda mostly stuck to acting during the breakup.

In 2021, the group was featured on the Maan and Typhoon song "Als ik je weer zien", but they were not credited as Acda en De Munnik, instead as individual solo members, Thomas Acda and Paul de Munnik.

On 23 March 2023, Acda en De Munnik announced their reunion on Qmusic, and released the song "Morgen wordt fantastich", their first new song in almost a decade. They sold out six reunion concerts at the Ziggo Dome in Amsterdam, on 26–28 October and 14–16 December. That year, they released their first new album in 11 years, AEDM. In November and December 2023, BNNVARA aired a six-part docuseries, Acda en De Munnik: Woorden van een ander, about how the duo reunited. In June 2024, the duo played the Pinkpop Festival for the first time. On 1 September 2024, the duo gave a free surprise concert at the Vondelpark in Amsterdam. From 7 to 10 November, the duo sold out four concerts at the Rotterdam Ahoy.

== Members ==
- Thomas Acda – vocals, guitar (1995–2015, 2023–present)
- Paul de Munnik – vocals, keyboards (1995–2015, 2023–present)

=== Live members ===
- David Middelhoff – bass guitar, guitar (1995–2015, 2023–present)
- JB Meijers – guitar, keyboards (2002–2015, 2023–present)
- Dave van Beek – drums (2002–2015, 2023–present)
- Angelo de Rijke – guitar (2013–2015, 2023–present)
- Patrick van Herrikhuyzen – keyboards (2023–present)

=== Former live members ===
- Diederik van Vleuten – keyboards (1995–2002)
- Kasper van Kooten – drums (1995–2002)

== Albums ==
=== Studio albums ===
- 1997 Acda en De Munnik
- 1998 Naar Huis
- 2000 Hier Zijn
- 2002 Groeten uit Maaiveld — the first album that was produced without first performing the songs in the theatre.
- 2004 Liedjes van Lenny — together with Groeten uit Maaiveld, the basis of the rock opera Ren Lenny Ren.
- 2007 Nachtmuziek
- 2009 Jouw Leven Lang Bij Mij
- 2012 ’t Heerst
- 2023 AEDM

=== Other releases ===
- 1997 Zwerf ’On
- 1999 Op Voorraad Live
- 2001 Live met het Metropole Orkest
- 2002 Trilogie
- 2005 Adem — compilation of greatest hits.

== Singles ==
List of singles, with selected chart positions
Title	Year	Peak chart positions		Album
Title	Year	NLD Dutch Top 40	NLD Single Top 100	Album
"Als het vuur gedoofd is"	1997	—	—	Acda en De Munnik
"Drie keer vallen"	1997	—	—	Acda en De Munnik
"Het geeft niet"	1997	—	—	Acda en De Munnik
"Niet of nooit geweest"	1998	2	2	Naar huis
"Laat me slapen"	1998	22	31	Naar huis
"Het regent zonnestralen"	1998	tip3	40	Naar huis
"Ol'55 (Asfalt voor mij alleen...)"	1999	tip13	84	Live in de Orangerie
"Schoolplein"/"Kees"	1999	tip5	53	Live in de Orangerie
"De kapitein deel II"	2000	24	16	Hier zijn
"Verkeerd verbonden"	2000	tip2	73	Hier zijn
"Brussel moeten heten"	2001	—	98	Live met het Metropole Orkest
"Ren Lenny ren"	2002	17	11	Groeten uit maaiveld
"Groeten uit maaiveld"	2002	10	7	Groeten uit maaiveld
"Mis ik mij"	2003	30	51	Groeten uit maaiveld
"Vandaag ben ik gaan lopen"	2004	40	28	In Oranje
"'t Is stil (Aan de overkant)"	2004	11	2	
"Totdat ik jou"	2004	36	23	Liedjes van Lenny
"(Noem me) Oud verdriet"	2004	—	67	Liedjes van Lenny
"Jaren ver van hier"	2005	tip5	19	Adem
"Waar was je dan"	2006	tip13	16	Adem
"Dan leef ik toch nog een keer"	2007	21	17	Nachtmuziek
"Heel veel lieve mensen"	2008	—	61	Nachtmuziek
"Eva"	2009	—	4	Jouw leven lang bij mij
"Ik blijf jouw leven lang bij mij"	2009	—	33	Jouw leven lang bij mij
"Woorden van een ander"	2011	tip2	8	't Heerst
"Voetstuk staan"	2012	tip3	18	't Heerst
"Draaien"	2013	tip3	93	Alle Singles
"Morgen wordt fantastisch"	2023	10	20	AEDM
"Tussendoor"	2023	tip6	—	AEDM
"CD van mij" (with Ronnie Flex)	2026	25	18	Non-album single

== See also ==
- Music of the Netherlands
