= Jan Jaap van der Wal =

Dutch stand-up comedian and television presenter (born 1979)

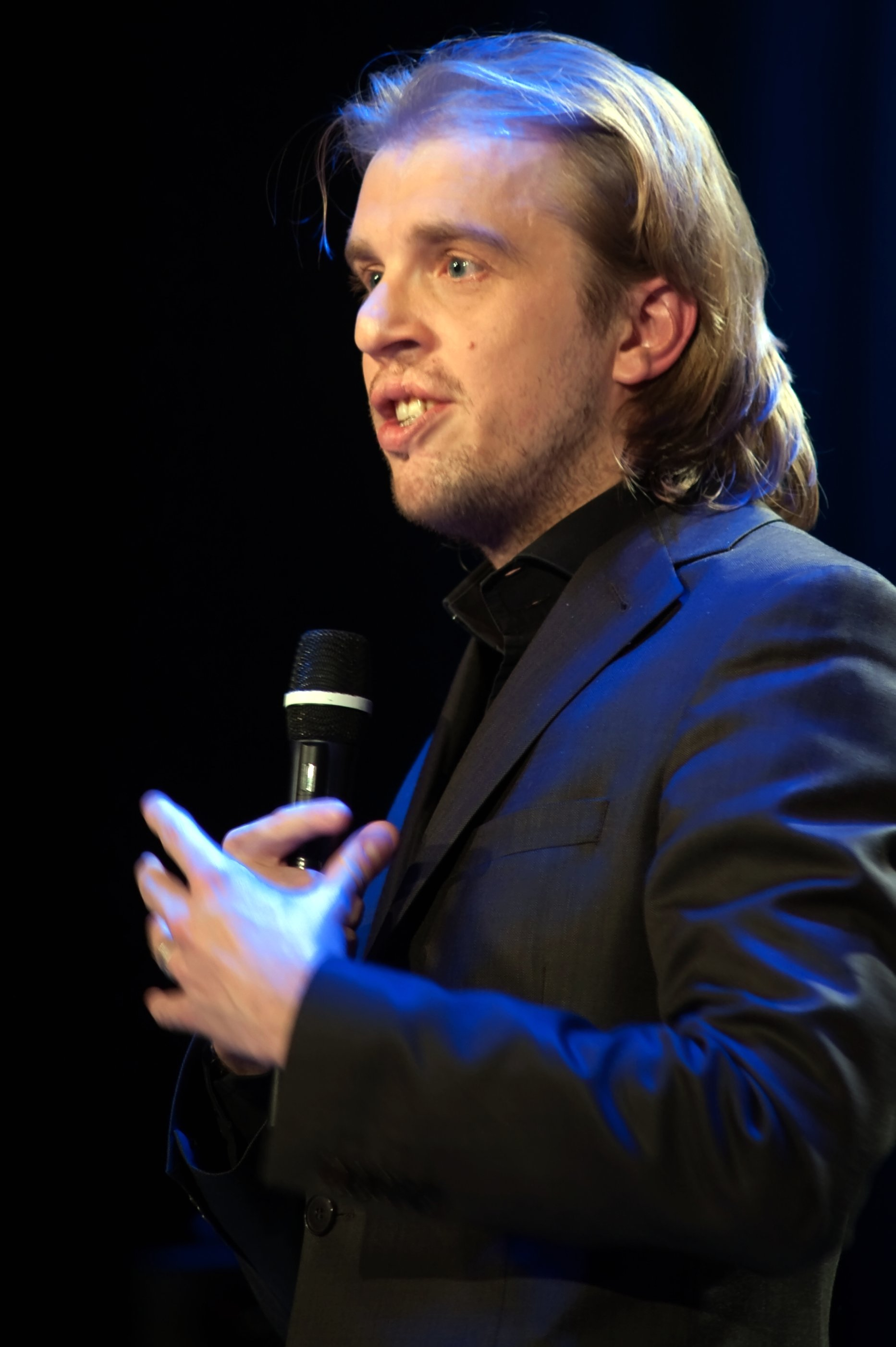
- van der Wal in 2010
- Born: 1 November 1979 (age 46); Leeuwarden, Netherlands
- Occupations: Television presenter; comedian; cabaret performer

Jan Jaap van der Wal (born 1 November 1979) is a Dutch stand-up comedian, cabaret performer and television presenter. He is known both in the Netherlands and in Flanders, Belgium for his television appearances and theatre shows.

== Career ==
=== Television ===
He is known as team captain in Dit was het nieuws, the Dutch adaptation of the BBC show Have I Got News for You, and as one of the jury members of the Belgian quiz show De Slimste Mens ter Wereld. Van der Wal was also a contestant in the De Slimste Mens ter Wereld in 2016 and in 2025.

In Belgium, Van der Wal presented the satirical news show De ideale wereld for four years. He previously appeared as sidekick in the show. He succeeded Otto-Jan Ham as presenter and Ella Leyers succeeded him as presenter of the show. In 2023, he presented the late night show Jan Jaap op zondag. The show ended after disappointing viewing figures.

Van der Wal did an oudejaarsconference in 2007 and in 2009, respectively titled Onderbewust and Lekker hard lachen met oliebollen. He had appearances in the talk shows RTL Late Night and Café Corsari.

=== Cabaret ===
Van der Wal is cabaret performer in the Netherlands and in Belgium. He performed multiple comedy and carabet shows, including Dystopia (2014), De Nieuwe Belg (2015) and Mijn vlakke land (2024, 2025). In some of his shows he talks about the differences and similarities between both countries.

=== Film ===
In 2014, he starred in the film The Happy Sad Route (and a Comedian) in which he travels through former Yugoslavia. The film was directed by Linda Hakeboom and won the best film award at the 2014 Friars Club Comedy Film Festival.

== Personal life ==
Van der Wal lives in Antwerpen, Belgium. Actress Eva Duijvestein and Van der Wal met each other in 2006 and they married in 2010. They have a son, born in 2017.

He has a cleft lip.

== Selected filmography (in the Netherlands) ==
The filmography below lists appearances on Dutch television.

=== As team captain ===
- Dit was het nieuws

=== As contestant / guest ===
- College Tour (2007)
- 5 jaar later (2014)

== Selected filmography (in Belgium) ==
The filmography below lists appearances on Belgian television.

=== As presenter ===
- De ideale wereld
- Jan Jaap op zondag

=== As jury member ===
- De Slimste Mens ter Wereld (2017 – present)

=== As contestant / guest ===
- De Slimste Mens ter Wereld (2016, 2025)
