= Van Dik Hout =

Dutch pop group

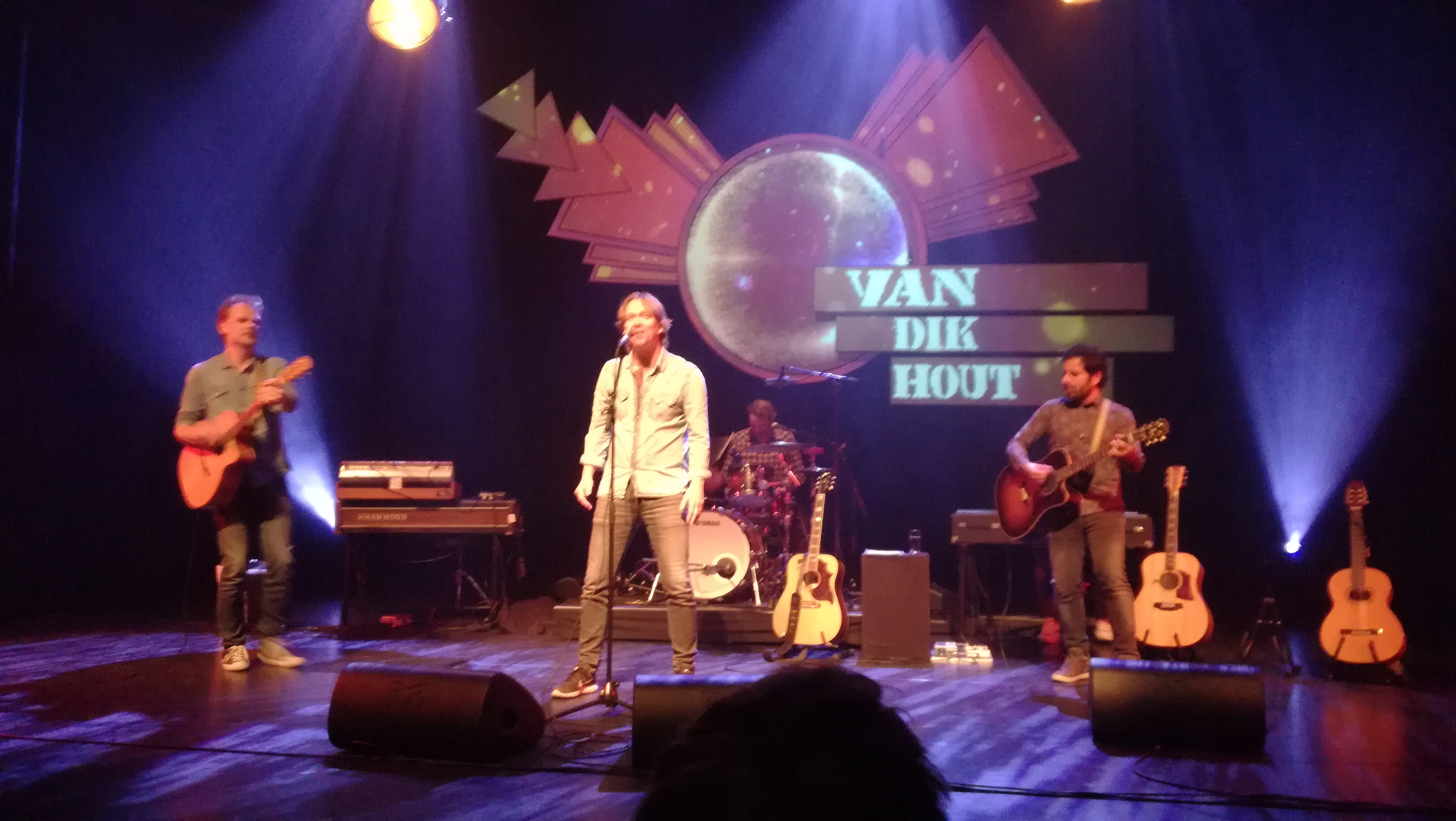

Background information
- Origin: Den Helder, Netherlands
- Genres: Nederpop
- Years active: late 1980s–present
- Spinoffs: De Poema's
- Website: vandikhout.nl

Van Dik Hout are a Dutch pop group from Den Helder in the north of the Netherlands. They formed in the late 1980s as a school band, but moved later to Amsterdam where they rechristened themselves into Van Dik Hout.

The band's biggest hit was 'Stil in mij' (Silent inside of me) in 1994 from their first album 'Van Dik Hout', which became platinum in The Netherlands. With this hit, the band also won a MTV Local Hero Award and a Zilveren Harp, a Dutch musical award.

In the early 2000s, they partnered with Dutch duo Acda en de Munnik to form the band De Poema's, under which name they had a number one hit in 2001 with Zij maakt het verschil (She makes the difference).

The band's name (literally "Of thick wood") is a play on the Dutch saying "Van dik hout zaagt men planken", literally "Planks get sawn from thick wood". In Dutch it translates to "The hard work has been done, albeit not very neatly". It can also mean "without much nuance".

== Members ==
- Martin Buitenhuis – vocals
- Benjamin Kribben – bass guitar, backing vocals
- Dave Rensmaag – guitar
- Sandro Assorgia – guitar, piano, backing vocals
- Louis de Wit (1988–2018) – drums
- Oscar Kraal (2018–2021†) – drums
- Ferry Kunst (2021–) – drums, backing vocals
- Patrick van Herrikhuyzen – keyboards

== Discography ==
=== Albums ===
- Van Dik Hout (1994) (From Thick Wood)
- Vier weken (1995) (Four Weeks)
- Kopstoot van een vlinder (1997) (Headbutt of a Butterfly)
- Ik jou en jij mij (2000) (You for Me, Me for You)
- Het beste van 1994-2001 (2001) (Best of 1994-2001)
- Vandaag alleen maar winnaars (2002) (Only Winners Today)
- Een handvol zonlicht (2004) (A Handful of Sunlight)
- Alles waar ik nooit aan begon (2007) (Everything I Never Began)
- Live in het Luxor Theater (2008) (Live in the Luxor Theatre)
- Van Dik Hout 15 Jaar (2009) (Van Dik Hout 15 Years)
- Leef! (2011) (Live!)
- Alles wat naar boven drijft (2014) (Everything that floats upwards)
