= Ladada (Mon dernier mot) =

2022 song by Claude

Single by Claude

from the album Parler français
- Language: Dutch; French
- Released: 21 October 2022
- Length: 2:44
- Label: Cloud 9 Music
- Songwriters: Claude Kiambe; Arno Krabman; Joren van der Voort

Claude singles chronology
"Ladada (Mon dernier mot)" (2022)	"Layla" (2023)

Music video
- "Ladada (Mon dernier mot)" on YouTube

"Ladada (Mon dernier mot)" (transl. "Ladada (My last word)") is the debut single by Dutch singer Claude. The song is in both Dutch and French with an English version also being released. It reached number one on the Dutch Top 40 in December 2022 where it remained for six weeks.

== Background ==
The single is a breakup song described by the singer as being "a bit of a middle finger to your ex" and takes inspiration from Stromae.

== Charts ==
=== Weekly charts ===
Weekly chart performance for "Ladada (Mon dernier mot)"
Chart (2022–2023)	Peak position
Belarus Airplay (TopHit)	14
CIS Airplay (TopHit)	23
Kazakhstan Airplay (TopHit)	5
Latvia Airplay (TopHit)	72
Lithuania Airplay (TopHit)	137
Netherlands (Dutch Top 40)	1
Netherlands (Single Top 100)	1
Romania Airplay (TopHit)	31
Russia Airplay (TopHit)	16

=== Monthly charts ===
Monthly chart performance for "Ladada (Mon dernier mot)"
Chart (2023)	Peak position
Belarus Airplay (TopHit)	20
CIS Airplay (TopHit)	40
Kazakhstan Airplay (TopHit)	11
Romania Airplay (TopHit)	44
Russia Airplay (TopHit)	27

=== Year-end charts ===
2022 year-end chart performance for "Ladada (Mon dernier mot)"
Chart (2022)	Position
Netherlands (Dutch Top 40)	67
Netherlands (Single Top 100)	97

2023 year-end chart performance for "Ladada (Mon dernier mot)"
Chart (2023)	Position
Belarus Airplay (TopHit)	78
Kazakhstan Airplay (TopHit)	158
Netherlands (Dutch Top 40)	14
Netherlands (Single Top 100)	5
Romania Airplay (TopHit)	175

== Certifications ==
Certifications and sales for "Ladada (Mon dernier mot)"
Region	Certification	Certified units/sales
Netherlands (NVPI)	Diamond	232,500^{‡}
^{‡} Sales+streaming figures based on certification alone.
