= Claude (singer) =

Congolese-born Dutch singer (born 2003)

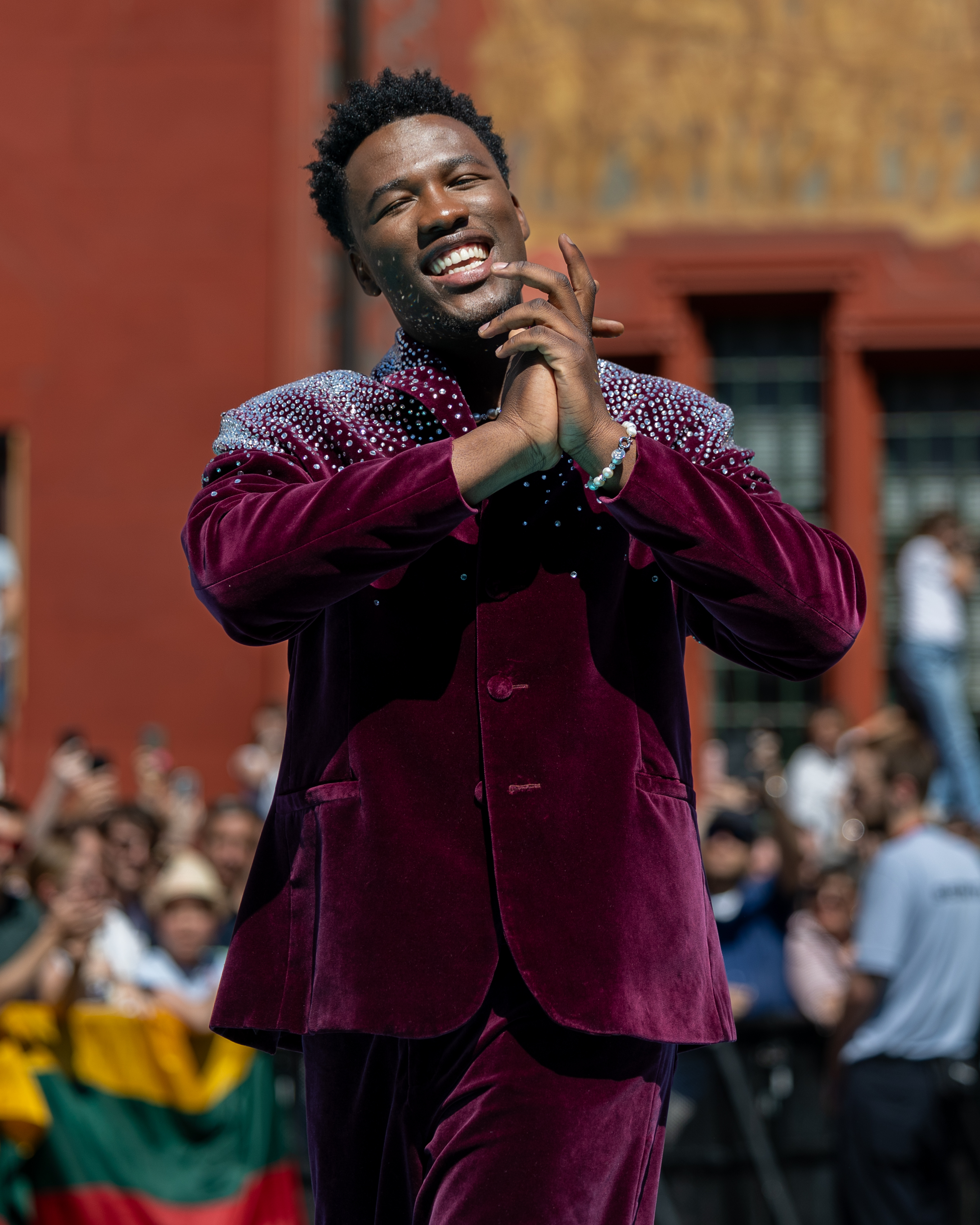
- Claude in 2025

Background information
- Born: Claude Kiambe; 16 September 2003 (age 23); Boma, Democratic Republic of the Congo
- Origin: Enkhuizen, Netherlands
- Genres: Pop; chanson
- Occupations: Singer; songwriter
- Instrument: Vocals
- Years active: 2017–present

Claude Kiambe (born 16 September 2003), known mononymously as Claude (/klaʊd/; Dutch pronunciation: [klʌu̯t]), (Note: Kiambe Dutchified the pronunciation of his first name to avoid association with the word kloot.) is a Congolese-born Dutch singer-songwriter. His debut single "Ladada (Mon dernier mot)" topped the Dutch Singles Chart in 2022, followed by a further four charting singles. His debut album, Parler français, was released in 2024. He represented the Netherlands in the Eurovision Song Contest 2025 with the song "C'est la vie".

== Early life and education ==
Kiambe was born on 16 September 2003 in Boma, Democratic Republic of the Congo. His mother fled to the Netherlands with him and his siblings when he was nine years old, first living in an asylum center in Alkmaar. The family later moved to Enkhuizen, where he obtained his HAVO high school diploma. He later studied hotel management, but discontinued the studies. He speaks Dutch, French and English.

== Career ==
In 2019, Kiambe took part in the eighth season of The Voice Kids, where he was eliminated in the battle stage. The following year, he won the casting show Are You Next?, signing a contract with the record label Cloud 9.

Kiambe released his debut single "Ladada (Mon dernier mot)" in 2022, which topped the Dutch Top 40. The song earned him multiple awards, such as the 3FM Award for Best Newcomer and the Qmusic Artist of the Year award. He has cited Stromae and Lewis Capaldi as inspirations for his music. He was scheduled to open Stromae's 2023 concerts at the Ziggo Dome before they were cancelled due to Stromae's health problems.

On 19 December 2024, Dutch broadcaster AVROTROS announced that Kiambe would be representing the Netherlands in the Eurovision Song Contest 2025. His entry, "C'est la vie", was released on 27 February 2025. In the contest's final, he placed 12th out of 26.

== Discography ==
=== Studio albums ===
Title	Details	Peak chart positions	
Title	Details	NLD	BEL (Fl)
Parler français	Released: 15 November 2024; Label: Cloud 9; Format: CD, LP, digital download, streaming	6	150

=== Extended plays ===
Title	Details
Beste Zangers 2024 (Claude)	Released: 15 November 2024; Label: Inmediate, Cornelis; Format: Digital download, streaming
The Singles Collection	Released: 9 May 2025; Label: Cloud 9; Format: Digital download, streaming

=== Singles ===
Title	Year	Peak chart positions										Certifications	Album or EP
Title	Year	NLD	AUT	BEL (FL)	FIN	ICE	LTU	NOR	SWE	SWI	UK Indie Break.	Certifications	Album or EP
"Ladada (Mon dernier mot)"	2022	1	—	—	—	—	—	—	—	—	—	NVPI: Diamond	Parler français
"Layla (Take Me on Your Way)"	2023	11	—	—	—	—	—	—	—	—	—	NVPI: Platinum	Parler français
"Vas-y (Ga maar)" (with Suzan & Freek)	2023	8	—	44	—	—	—	—	—	—	—	NVPI: Platinum	Parler français
"Écoutez-moi"	2024	32	—	—	—	—	—	—	—	—	—	NVPI: Gold	Parler français
"Parler français"	2024	— (Note: "Parler français" did not enter the Dutch Single Top 100, but peaked at number 27 on the Single Tip chart.)	—	—	—	—	—	—	—	—	—		Parler français
"La pression"	2024	— (Note: "La pression" did not enter the Dutch Single Top 100, but peaked at number one on the Single Tip chart.)	—	—	—	—	—	—	—	—	—		Parler français
"Je t'aime" (with Zoë Tauran)	2024	35	—	—	—	—	—	—	—	—	—		Parler français
"C'est la vie"	2025	2	63	49	44	13	13	67	53	23	17	NVPI: Gold	The Singles Collection
"Amour"	2025	— (Note: "Amour" did not enter the Dutch Single Top 100, but peaked at number seven on the Single Tip chart.)	—	—	—	—	—	—	—	—	—		Non-album singles
"Eb & vloed"	2026	— (Note: "Eb & vloed" did not enter the Dutch Single Top 100, but peaked at number 30 on the Single Tip chart.)	—	—	—	*	—	—	—	—	—		Non-album singles
"Alles wat ik wil"	2026	— (Note: "Alles wat ik wil" did not enter the Dutch Single Top 100, but peaked at number 28 on the Single Tip chart.)	—	—	—	*	—	—	—	—	—		Non-album singles
"—" denotes a recording that did not chart or was not released in that territory. "*" denotes that a chart did not exist at that time.

== Awards and nominations ==
Year	Award	Category	Nominees	Result	Ref.
2023	3FM Awards	Best Newcomer	Himself	Won	
2024	3FM Awards	Best Artist	Himself	Nominated	
2024	3FM Awards	Best Song	"Layla (Take Me on Your Way)"	Won	
2024	3FM Awards	Best Collaboration	"Vas-y (Ga maar)" (with Suzan & Freek)	Won	
2024	Qmusic Top 40 Awards	Best National Artist	Himself	Won	
2024	MTV Europe Music Awards	Best Dutch Act	Himself	Nominated	
2025	3FM Awards	Best Artist	Himself	Nominated	
2025	3FM Awards	Best Album	Parler français	Won	
2025	Eurovision Awards	Music Video	Himself	Nominated	

== Notes ==
Awards and achievements
Preceded by Joost Klein with "Europapa"	Netherlands in the Eurovision Song Contest; 2025	Succeeded by Incumbent
