= Maan (singer) =

Dutch singer (born 1997)

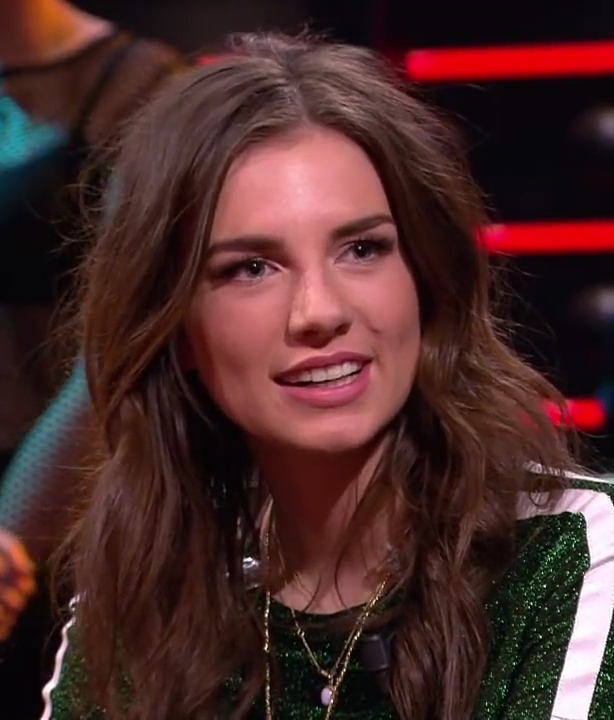
- Maan at De Wereld Draait Door in 2017

Background information
- Born: Maan de Steenwinkel; 10 February 1997 (age 29); Utrecht, Netherlands
- Genre: Pop
- Occupation: Singer
- Years active: 2015–present
- Website: maanofficial.nl

Maan de Steenwinkel (born 10 February 1997), also known mononymously as Maan, is a Dutch singer. She first came to prominence after winning season six of The Voice of Holland. She has subsequently taken part in the Dutch television series De beste zangers van Nederland and in the Dutch version of Dance Dance Dance.

In 2019, de Steenwinkel became the first The Voice of Holland winner to have a number-one single on the Dutch Top 40 with "Hij is Van Mij". In 2023, her song "Stiekem" with Goldband became the biggest Dutch-language hit single of all time, according to the Dutch Top 40.

== Early life ==
De Steenwinkel was born in Utrecht. The family moved to Bergen, North Holland a year later. Her father Siebe de Steenwinkel is a television director for talk show programmes such as Pauw and De Wereld Draait Door and her mother was a handicraft teacher.

She attended Murmellius Gymnasium in Alkmaar.

== Career ==
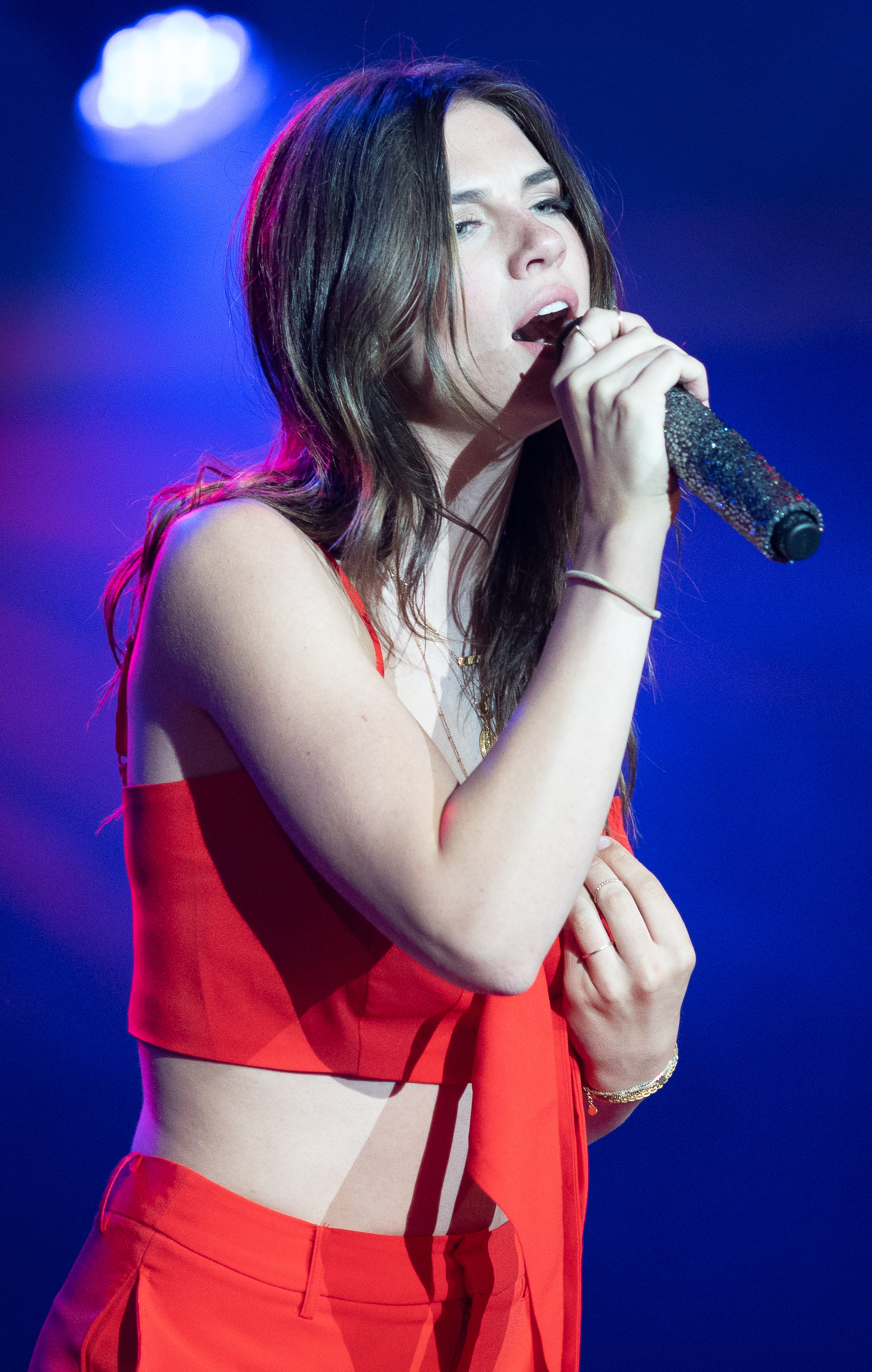
Maan performing in 2018

In 2015, de Steenwinkel auditioned for season six of The Voice of Holland, where she was a member of Team Marco. She performed "The Power of Love" in her blind audition, where all four coaches turned their chairs. On 29 January 2016, de Steenwinkel went on to win the competition. Following her win, she released the single "Perfect World" produced by Hardwell, which was certified gold and peaked within the Top 40 in the Netherlands. Her follow-up single, "Ride It", achieved similar levels of success. In 2016, she voiced Becky the porcupine in the Dutch dub of the animated film Sing.

In 2017, de Steenwinkel became involved with season ten of De beste zangers van Nederland and season three of Dance Dance Dance. In December, de Steenwinkel was performing live at Radio 538 when a nude streaker ambushed the stage, causing her to burst into tears mid-performance. It was later revealed that the station's DJ Frank Dane initiated the prank, which led to controversy.

In February 2019, "Hij is Van Mij", her song with Kris Kross Amsterdam, Bizzey and Tabitha, reached number one on the Dutch Top 40, and Maan became the first The Voice of Holland winner to record a number-one single.

In January 2020, she released her debut album Onverstaanbaar.

In March 2021, Maan had her second number-one single "Blijven slapen", a collaboration with Snelle. In November 2022, she released "Stiekem", a song with the Dutch pop group Goldband, shortly after publicising her relationship with member Karel Gerlach. "Stiekem" spent nine weeks at number two in 2022 and 2023. In May 2023, it became the biggest Dutch-language hit single of all time, according to the Dutch Top 40.

== Personal life ==
Maan was in a relationship with Dutch DJ Tony Junior beginning in 2017 when they met at the Mysteryland festival, but in December 2019, she announced their breakup on Instagram. In August 2022, Goldband's Karel Gerlach announced at Lowlands that he was dating Maan.

== Filmography ==
Year	Title	Role	Notes
2015–16	The Voice of Holland	Herself	Winner
2016	Kerst met de Zandtovenaar	Mary	
2017	De beste zangers van Nederland	Herself	Participant
2017	Dance Dance Dance	Herself	Participant

== Discography ==
=== Studio albums ===
Title	Details	NLD	Certification
Onverstaanbaar	Released: 31 January 2020; Format: CD, Digital download	1	NVPI: Gold
Leven	Released: 14 October 2022; Format: CD, LP, Digital download	11	NVPI: Platinum
Eclips	Released: 6 September 2024; Format: Digital download	—	

=== Extended plays ===
Title	Details	NLD	Certification
AM	Released: 17 November 2017; Format: Digital download	—	
PM	Released: 24 November 2017; Format: Digital download	—	
Waar ga je heen	Released: 26 October 2018; Format: Digital download	15	NVPI: Gold

=== Singles ===
List of singles, with selected Top 100 chart positions
Title	Year	Peak chart positions			Certification	Album
Title	Year	NL 40	NL 100	BEL (FL)	Certification	Album
"Warrior"	2015	—	—	—		
"Halo"	2015	—	—	—		
"Let It Go"	2016	—	—	—		
"I Don't Believe You"	2016	—	—	—		
"New York, New York & Empire State of Mind"	2016	—	—	—		
"Perfect World"	2016	31	25	—	NVPI: Gold	AM/PM
"Ride It"	2016	28	58	—	NVPI: Gold	AM/PM
"DJ" (with Jack $hirak)	2016	59	—	—		AM/PM
"Give You All I Got"	2016	54	—	—		AM/PM
"Someone That I Never Knew"	2017	—	—	—		AM/PM
"Jij bent de liefde"	2017	45	83	—		AM/PM
"Nessun Dorma"	2017	—	—	—		
"Vraag jezelf eens af"	2017	—	—	—		
"They Don't Play Our Love Song Any More"	2017	—	—	—		
"I Won't Give Up"	2017	—	—	—		
"Wereld zonder jou" (with Brace)	2017	—	—	—		
"In Amsterdam" (with Sevn Alias)	2017	52	3	— (Note: "In Amsterdam" did not enter the Tipparade of Flanders, but did enter the Bubbling Under)	NVPI: 2 x Platinum	Picasso (Sevn Alias)
"Almost Had It All"	2017	50	—	—		AM/PM
"Pockets Full of Change"	2017	57	—	—		AM/PM
"Me"	2017	—	—	—		AM/PM
"Another Lonely Christmas"	2017	—	—	—		
"Blijf bij mij" (with Ronnie Flex)	2017	2	1	59	NVPI: Diamond	
"Spijt" (with Jonna Fraser)	2018	32	25	96		Waar Ga Je Heen
"Lief zoals je bent"	2018	16	12	— (Note: "Lief Zoals Je Bent" did not enter the Tipparade of Flanders, but did enter the Bubbling Under)	NVPI: Gold	Waar Ga Je Heen
"Waar ga je heen"	2018	—	100	— (Note: "Waar Ga Je Heen" did not enter the Tipparade of Flanders, but did enter the Bubbling Under)		Waar Ga Je Heen
"Hij is van mij" (with Kris Kross Amsterdam, Bizzey & Tabitha)	2018	1	1	72	NPVI: 4 x Platinum	
"Ik kom eraan"	2019	59	—	—		
"Zo kan het dus ook"	2019	12	7	54	NVPI: Platinum	Onverstaanbaar
"Jij en ik tegen de wereld"	2019	55	68	—		Onverstaanbaar
"Ze huilt maar ze lacht"	2019	3	8	— (Note: "Ze Huilt Maar Ze Lacht" did not enter the Tipparade of Flanders, but did enter the Bubbling Under)	NVPI: Platinum	Onverstaanbaar
"Onverstaanbaar"	2020	—	28	—		Onverstaanbaar
"Als ik ga" (with Sevn Alias)	2020	—	37	—		Onverstaanbaar
"Rode wijn" (with Kraantje Pappie)	2020	23	28	— (Note: "Rode Wijn" did not enter the Tipparade of Flanders, but did enter the Bubbling Under)	NVPI: Platinum	
"Nog even niet"	2020	53	—	—		Onverstaanbaar
"Zo kan het dus ook Part 2"	2020	—	98	75		
"Als ik je weer zie" (with Thomas Acda, Paul de Munnik & Typhoon)	2021	6	5	59	NVPI: Platinum	
"Blijven slapen" (with Snelle)	2021	1	2	10	NVPI: Platinum	Leven
"Niks is heilig"	2021	15	40	—		
"Leven"	2021	15	25	—		Leven
"Naar de maan" (with DJVT)	2022	9	19	—	NVPI: Gold	Leven
"Sowieso overhoop"	2022	39	55	—		Leven
"Stiekem" (with Goldband)	2022	2	1	2	NVPI: Platinum	Leven
"Paranoia"	2024	—	—	—		Eclips
"Rondje van de zaak"	2024	—	—	—		Eclips
"Lilly"	2024	—	—	—		Eclips
"Vermomd entree"	2024	—	—	—		Eclips
"—" denotes releases that did not chart or were not released in that territory.

Awards and achievements
Preceded by O'G3NE	Winner of The Voice of Holland; 2015–2016	Succeeded by Pleun Bierbooms
