= Lithuania in the Eurovision Song Contest 2026 =

- Eurovision Song Contest 2026
- Participating broadcaster: Lithuanian National Radio and Television (LRT)
- Country: Lithuania
- Selection process: Eurovizija.LT 2026
- Selection date: 27 February 2026

Competing entry
- Song: "Sólo quiero más"
- Artist: Lion Ceccah
- Songwriters: Aurimas Galvelis; Tomas Alenčikas

Placement
- Semi-final result: Qualified (8th, 101 points)
- Final result: 22nd, 22 points

Participation chronology

Lithuania was represented at the Eurovision Song Contest 2026 by the song "Sólo quiero más", written by Aurimas Galvelis and Tomas Alenčikas, and performed by Alenčikas under his stage name Lion Ceccah. The Lithuanian participating broadcaster, Lietuvos radijas ir televizija (LRT), organised the national final Eurovizija.LT to select its entry for the contest.

== Background ==
Before to 2026, Lietuvos radijas ir televizija (LRT) had participated in the Eurovision Song Contest representing Lithuania twenty-five times since its debut in 1994. Its best placing was achieved in 2006, with the song "We Are the Winners" performed by LT United, which finished in sixth place in the final. Since the introduction of semi-finals in 2004, LRT has managed to qualify for the final fourteen times. It was represented in 2025 by the song "Tavo akys", performed by alternative rock band Katarsis, who qualified for the final and finished 16th overall with 96 points.

As part of its duties as participating broadcaster, LRT organises the selection of its entry in the Eurovision Song Contest and broadcasts the event in the country. LRT has used a national final to select all of its Eurovision entries, with the exception of its debut entry in 1994. Between 2020 and 2023, the national final format Pabandom iš naujo! was used to select its entry. In 2024, LRT introduced a new format, titled Eurovizija.LT. LRT confirmed its intention to participate in the 2026 contest in July 2025; the following month, the broadcaster started accepting applications for Eurovizija.LT 2026.

== Before Eurovision ==
=== Eurovizija.LT 2026 ===
Eurovizija.LT 2026 was the national final format organized by LRT to select its entry for the Eurovision Song Contest 2026. It was held between 24 January and 27 February 2026 and is hosted by Gabrielė Martirosian, Eglė Kernagytė-Dambrauskė and Rimvydas Černiauskas. The shows were broadcast on LRT televizija and LRT Lituanica, as well as online via the broadcaster's website lrt.lt and official LRT YouTube channel.

==== Format ====
The competition saw 40 entries compete across five semi-finals, held between 24 January and 21 February 2026, and a final on 27 February 2026. A 50/50 combination of jury and public vote determined the ranking in each phase, with the top two entries from each semi-final (out of the eight total) qualifying for the final; the third-place entry advanced to a wildcard round, where only the audience determined one additional finalist. In case of a tie in any of the previous stages, the public ranking would take precedence. The scoring system was the same as used at the Eurovision Song Contest: the top ten entries from both the jury vote and the televote are assigned scores of 1–8, 10, and 12 points. In the semi-finals, viewers could vote via SMS and on the balsuok.lrt.lt voting platform, while in the final, SMS voting was scrapped.

Performances for the semi-finals were pre-recorded, while they were delivered live in the final.

==== Competing entries ====
On 18 August 2025, LRT opened a submission platform for interested artists, lasting until 11 November 2025. Each applicant could only submit one entry. Performers were required to be citizens of the European Union who have a permanent residence permit in Lithuania, while songwriters could be of any nationality, though citizens of countries "hostile to Lithuania" were not allowed to submit entries. The selected artists are able to withdraw until 10 December 2025 and will have to submit the final version of the song to the organizers by 23 December 2025.

On 25 November 2025, the list of the 40 participating artists and songs was released by LRT. Among the selected competing artists was Aistė Pilvelytė, who is participating in the Lithuanian national selection for the 14th time. Black Biceps, Il Senso, Lion Ceccah, Gabija Lokytė (as part of VB Gang), Lolita Zero, Noy and Shwr (formerly known as Shower) also have all competed in previous editions of the Lithuanian national selection and advanced to their respective finals. Paulè also represented Lithuania at the Junior Eurovision Song Contest 2011 as Paulina Skrabytė.

| Artist | Song | Songwriter(s) |
|---|---|---|
| Agata Ray | "Gravity Lies" | Aleksandr Lipnevič; Artiom Riamson; Jevgenij Podskokov |
| Agnė Buškevičiūtė | "Unbound" | Agnė Buškevičiūtė; Celine Alette Pedersen Breivoll; Jonas Holteberg Jensen; Oscar Immanuel Mathisen; Vilius Tumalavičius |
| Aika | "Raga" | Alvydas Mačiulskas; Jekaterina Fiodorova |
| Aistė Pilvelytė | "Tarp žvaigždžių tylos" | Aistė Pilvelytė; Gendrius Jakubėnas; Justas Chachlauskas |
| Akire | "Šiluma" | Erika Elzbergaitė; Justinas Drūtys |
| Atikin | "Deganti žemelė" | Lukas Kemėšis; Nikita Vaitkevičius; Tomas Tamulionis |
| Aurimas Papečkys-Aury | "Tu mano" | Aurimas Papečkys |
| Black Biceps | "Let Me Cook" | Andrzej Jaworski; Jan Vávra; Vitalij Valentinovič |
| Dagna | "Sau meluojam" | Audrius Petrauskas; Dagna Kondratavičiūtė |
| Elizabeth Olshey | "Between" | Elžbieta Oleškevič |
| Emi Acidic | "U Broke Me" | Emilija Balsevičiūtė |
| Freya Alley | "No Kiss Goodbye" | Kamilė Balčytytė; Laurence Hobbs; Max Honsinger |
| Grete | "Parade" | Grėtė Eitmantytė; Sam Cooper |
| Hansanova | "Lumina" | Giedrius Balčiūnas |
| Il Senso | "Brave Enough" | Agnė Daniūnaitė; Deividas Edas Kukta |
| Jokūbas Jankauskas | "Shine" | Jokūbas Jankauskas |
| Juozas Martin | "Atmerk akis" | Juozas Martinkėnas |
| Justė Osh | "Gaisras" | Justė Bubelytė; Liutauras Baltrūnas; Rokas Povilius |
| Ledi Ais | "Mes siekiam žvaigždžių" | Ingrida Tamošaitienė |
| Lion Ceccah | "Sólo quiero más" | Aurimas Galvelis; Tomas Alenčikas |
| Lokytė | "Vilko akių" | Gabija Lokytė; Kasparas Barisas; Vidas Bareikis |
| Lolita Zero | "Salve in meum mundum" | Gytis Ivanauskas; Vitas Vaičiulis |
| Matas Ligeika | "Svetimi" | Matas Ligeika; Gytis Valickas; Normantas Ulevičus; Rokas Jančiauskas |
| Melanija | "The Offering" | Gendrius Jakubėnas; Stasys Šarkiūnas |
| Mėnulio Fazė | "Dabar ir čia" | Vladas Chockevičius |
| More. | "Taip lengvai" | Dovydas Lazdinis; Ema Zdanavičiūtė |
| Noy | "Stand Up" | Leon Somov; Nojus Žebrauskas |
| Nøra Blu | "Hold My Own" | Raigardas Tautkus |
| Patricija Luščynska | "Worth It" | Patricija Luščynska |
| Paulè | "Sako" | Paulina Skrabytė; Viktoras Woop |
| Rug!le | "Ikona Žemaitė" | Rugilė Ulytė |
| Selene Ice | "Nessuno" | Allex Loiudice; Leonardo Valcarenghi; Loris Gregorio; Michele Rivoltini; Tautvydė Pukštytė |
| Shwr | "Contact!" | Dominykas Kazimieras Krulikovskis; Faustas Venckus; Jonas Filmanavičius; Simonas Krukonis; Vainius Indriūnas |
| Siga | "Noriu jo" | Sigita Jonynaitė |
| The Ditties | "Mambo" | Veronika Čičinskaitė-Golovanova |
| Theya LeRoy | "Oblivion" | Tėja Peleckaitė |
| Thomas G | "One Night Lover" | Dovydas Lazdinis; Ema Zdanavičiūtė; Tomas Gailiūnas |
| Valdas Lacko | "Pabandom" | Vladas Chockevičius |
| Vilnius Voices | "Grįšim" | Monika Švilpaitė-Rogoža |
| Walls of Water (Note: Introduced as Jonas Vilimas during the announcement of the participants, he later formed a separate group called Walls of Water.) | "Unshakable" | Jonas Vilimas |

==== Jury members ====
The jury in the semi-finals consisted of five people, with more jury members participating in the final.

Jury members by show
| Jury member | Semi-finals | | | | | Final | Occupation(s) |
| Jury member | 1 | 2 | 3 | 4 | 5 | Final | Occupation(s) |
|---|---|---|---|---|---|---|---|
| Kamilė Gudmonaitė | Yes | Yes | Yes | Yes | Yes | Yes | theater director, singer, member of Kamanių Šilelis |
| Ramūnas Zilnys | No | Yes | Yes | Yes | Yes | Yes | music reviewer, radio host, Eurovision commentator |
| Ieva Narkutė | Yes | Yes | No | Yes | No | Yes | singer-songwriter |
| Vytautas Bikus | Yes | Yes | No | Yes | No | Yes | composer, songwriter of Lithuanian Eurovision entries in 2015 and 2018 |
| Gerūta Griniūtė | No | No | Yes | No | Yes | Yes | radio host, former Eurovision commentator |
| Unė Liandzbergytė | Yes | No | No | No | No | Yes | radio host |
| Kristupas Naraškevičius | No | Yes | No | No | No | Yes | TV and radio host |
| Jievaras Jasinskis | No | No | Yes | No | Yes | No | trombonist, composer, conductor, 2010 Lithuanian representative as part of InCulto |
| Lukas Keraitis | No | No | Yes | No | No | Yes | bass player, member of Abudu |
| Karolis Talutis | Yes | No | No | No | No | No | singer, member of 8 Kambarys |
| Viktoras Diawara | No | No | No | Yes | No | No | singer, guitar player, 2001 and 2006 Lithuanian representative |
| Kamilė Tumelytė | No | No | No | No | Yes | No | singer, radio host |
| Lukas Radzevičius | No | No | No | No | No | Yes | singer, 2025 Lithuanian representative as part of Katarsis |
| Stanislavas Stavickis-Stano | No | No | No | No | No | Yes | singer-songwriter |

==== Semi-finals ====
The five semi-finals of the competition were filmed on 14, 20 and 27 January, 2 and 3 February 2026 at LRT's studios in Vilnius, and were being aired on 24 and 31 January, 7, 14, and 21 February 2026. In each semi-final, 8 of the 40 competing acts performed, with the top two entries progressing to the final, while the third-place finisher advanced to a wildcard round.

Qualifier Wildcard round qualifier

Semi-final 1 – 24 January 2026
| R/O | Artist | Song | Jury | Public vote | | Total | Place |
| R/O | Artist | Song | Jury | Votes | Points | Total | Place |
|---|---|---|---|---|---|---|---|
| 1 | Siga | "Noriu jo" | 4 | 168 | 3 | 7 | 8 |
| 2 | Valdas Lacko | "Pabandom" | 3 | 228 | 4 | 7 | 7 |
| 3 | Elizabeth Olshey | "Between" | 10 | 402 | 5 | 15 | 4 |
| 4 | Noy | "Stand Up" | 6 | 1,032 | 12 | 18 | 2 |
| 5 | Rug!le | "Ikona Žemaitė" | 12 | 771 | 10 | 22 | 1 |
| 6 | Aistė Pilvelytė | "Tarp žvaigždžių tylos" | 7 | 417 | 6 | 13 | 6 |
| 7 | Thomas G | "One Night Lover" | 8 | 456 | 7 | 15 | 3 |
| 8 | The Ditties | "Mambo" | 5 | 547 | 8 | 13 | 5 |

Semi-final 2 – 31 January 2026
| R/O | Artist | Song | Jury | Public vote | | Total | Place |
| R/O | Artist | Song | Jury | Votes | Points | Total | Place |
|---|---|---|---|---|---|---|---|
| 1 | Theya LeRoy | "Oblivion" | 3 | 54 | 3 | 6 | 8 |
| 2 | Vilnius Voices | "Grįšim" | 12 | 2,078 | 10 | 22 | 2 |
| 3 | Mėnulio Fazė | "Dabar ir čia" | 4 | 111 | 4 | 8 | 7 |
| 4 | Grete | "Parade" | 8 | 952 | 7 | 15 | 3 |
| 5 | Atikin | "Deganti žemelė" | 10 | 5,278 | 12 | 22 | 1 |
| 6 | Melanija | "The Offering" | 5 | 320 | 5 | 10 | 6 |
| 7 | Dagna | "Sau meluojam" | 7 | 571 | 6 | 13 | 5 |
| 8 | Agnė Buškevičiūtė | "Unbound" | 6 | 1,244 | 8 | 14 | 4 |

Semi-final 3 – 7 February 2026
| R/O | Artist | Song | Jury | Public vote | | Total | Place |
| R/O | Artist | Song | Jury | Votes | Points | Total | Place |
|---|---|---|---|---|---|---|---|
| 1 | Agata Ray | "Gravity Lies" | 4 | 816 | 7 | 11 | 6 |
| 2 | Juozas Martin | "Atmerk akis" | 7 | 358 | 5 | 12 | 5 |
| 3 | Justė Osh | "Gaisras" | 8 | 399 | 6 | 14 | 4 |
| 4 | Akire | "Šiluma" | 5 | 191 | 4 | 9 | 7 |
| 5 | Ledi Ais | "Mes siekiam žvaigždžių" | 3 | 167 | 3 | 6 | 8 |
| 6 | Aurimas Papečkys-Aury | "Tu mano" | 6 | 899 | 8 | 14 | 3 |
| 7 | Paulè | "Sako" | 12 | 1,103 | 10 | 22 | 2 |
| 8 | Black Biceps | "Let Me Cook" | 10 | 1,510 | 12 | 22 | 1 |

Semi-final 4 – 14 February 2026
| R/O | Artist | Song | Jury | Public vote | | Total | Place |
| R/O | Artist | Song | Jury | Votes | Points | Total | Place |
|---|---|---|---|---|---|---|---|
| 1 | Patricija Luščynska | "Worth It" | 5 | 534 | 7 | 12 | 5 |
| 2 | Selene Ice | "Nessuno" | 4 | 273 | 3 | 7 | 8 |
| 3 | Lion Ceccah | "Sólo quiero más" | 8 | 4,541 | 12 | 20 | 2 |
| 4 | Freya Alley | "No Kiss Goodbye" | 3 | 378 | 4 | 7 | 7 |
| 5 | Emi Acidic | "U Broke Me" | 7 | 494 | 6 | 13 | 4 |
| 6 | More. | "Taip lengvai" | 6 | 423 | 5 | 11 | 6 |
| 7 | Nøra Blu | "Hold My Own" | 10 | 3,966 | 8 | 18 | 3 |
| 8 | Shwr | "Contact!" | 12 | 4,535 | 10 | 22 | 1 |

Semi-final 5 – 21 February 2026
| R/O | Artist | Song | Jury | Public vote | | Total | Place |
| R/O | Artist | Song | Jury | Votes | Points | Total | Place |
|---|---|---|---|---|---|---|---|
| 1 | Hansanova | "Lumina" | 5 | 344 | 3 | 8 | 8 |
| 2 | Lokytė | "Vilko akių" | 3 | 437 | 5 | 8 | 7 |
| 3 | Matas Ligeika | "Svetimi" | 7 | 502 | 7 | 14 | 4 |
| 4 | Il Senso | "Brave Enough" | 6 | 494 | 6 | 12 | 6 |
| 5 | Jokūbas Jankauskas | "Shine" | 4 | 739 | 10 | 14 | 3 |
| 6 | Walls of Water | "Unshakable" | 8 | 712 | 8 | 16 | 2 |
| 7 | Aika | "Raga" | 10 | 422 | 4 | 14 | 5 |
| 8 | Lolita Zero | "Salve in meum mundum" | 12 | 1,102 | 12 | 24 | 1 |

==== Wildcard round ====
After the fifth semi-final, an online wildcard round was organized, in which all contestants who finished third in the semi-finals participated. After a 25-hour voting window, Nøra Blu, who received the most votes, became an additional finalist. The results were announced during the LRT televizija morning show Labas rytas, Lietuva ("Good morning, Lithuania") on 23 February 2026.

Online wildcard round – 21–22 February 2026
| SF | Artist | Song | Votes | Place |
|---|---|---|---|---|
| 1 | Thomas G | "One Night Lover" | 1,861 | 4 |
| 2 | Grete | "Parade" | 8,165 | 2 |
| 3 | Aurimas Papečkys-Aury | "Tu mano" | 1,489 | 5 |
| 4 | Nøra Blu | "Hold My Own" | 13,612 | 1 |
| 5 | Jokūbas Jankauskas | "Shine" | 1,927 | 3 |

==== Final ====
The live final of the competition took place on 27 February 2026 at the Twinsbet Arena in Vilnius. In addition to the performances of the competing entries Katarsis performed their 2025 Lithuanian Eurovision entry "Tavo akys" as the opening act, while Aidan performed the 2026 Maltese Eurovision entry "Bella" and Evgenya Redko performed a medley of her songs as the interval acts. "Sólo quiero más" performed by Lion Ceccah was selected as the winner by a combination of jury (50%) and public votes (50%). Unlike in the last two years, no superfinal was held and in the event of a tie, the public vote was to take precedence. In contrast the semi-finals, the public voting was conducted exclusively online via the balsuok.lrt.lt voting platform.

Final – 27 February 2026
| R/O | Artist | Song | Jury | | Public vote | | Total | Place |
| R/O | Artist | Song | Votes | Points | Votes | Points | Total | Place |
|---|---|---|---|---|---|---|---|---|
| 1 | Rug!le | "Ikona Žemaitė" | 47 | 4 | 1,211 | 3 | 7 | 8 |
| 2 | Walls of Water | "Unshakable" | 28 | 1 | 1,161 | 2 | 3 | 10 |
| 3 | Lion Ceccah | "Sólo quiero más" | 102 | 10 | 38,747 | 12 | 22 | 1 |
| 4 | Nøra Blu | "Hold My Own" | 73 | 7 | 7,012 | 7 | 14 | 3 |
| 5 | Noy | "Stand Up" | 24 | 0 | 493 | 0 | 0 | 11 |
| 6 | Atikin | "Deganti žemelė" | 36 | 2 | 10,501 | 8 | 10 | 6 |
| 7 | Shwr | "Contact!" | 102 | 12 | 15,764 | 10 | 22 | 2 |
| 8 | Vilnius Voices | "Grįšim" | 84 | 8 | 2,716 | 4 | 12 | 5 |
| 9 | Lolita Zero | "Salve in meum mundum" | 60 | 5 | 3,232 | 5 | 10 | 7 |
| 10 | Paulè | "Sako" | 42 | 3 | 1,062 | 1 | 4 | 9 |
| 11 | Black Biceps | "Let Me Cook" | 62 | 6 | 3,892 | 6 | 12 | 4 |

Detailed jury votes
| R/O | Song | Juror | | | | | | | | | | Total | Points |
| R/O | Song | 1 | 2 | 3 | 4 | 5 | 6 | 7 | 8 | 9 | 10 | Total | Points |
|---|---|---|---|---|---|---|---|---|---|---|---|---|---|
| 1 | "Ikona Žemaitė" | 7 | 2 | 3 | 5 | 5 | 5 | 4 | 3 | 7 | 6 | 47 | 4 |
| 2 | "Unshakable" | 4 | 1 | 1 | 2 | 6 | 2 | 2 | 4 | 5 | 1 | 28 | 1 |
| 3 | "Sólo quiero más" | 10 | 11 | 11 | 8 | 10 | 11 | 10 | 11 | 10 | 10 | 102 (Note: Despite "Contact!" and "Sólo quiero más" receiving the same number of points from the jury, "Contact!" was deemed to have finished higher due to receiving more first-place rankings from the jury, with five jury members placing "Contact!" first compared to four who ranked "Sólo quiero más" first) | 10 |
| 4 | "Hold My Own" | 9 | 8 | 6 | 10 | 4 | 9 | 6 | 6 | 6 | 9 | 73 | 7 |
| 5 | "Stand Up" | 3 | 3 | 2 | 4 | 1 | 3 | 1 | 1 | 2 | 4 | 24 | 0 |
| 6 | "Deganti žemelė" | 2 | 5 | 9 | 3 | 3 | 1 | 5 | 2 | 3 | 3 | 36 | 2 |
| 7 | "Contact!" | 11 | 10 | 10 | 11 | 9 | 8 | 11 | 10 | 11 | 11 | 102 | 12 |
| 8 | "Grįšim" | 8 | 9 | 7 | 7 | 11 | 10 | 7 | 9 | 9 | 7 | 84 | 8 |
| 9 | "Salve in meum mundum" | 5 | 4 | 5 | 6 | 7 | 7 | 8 | 8 | 8 | 2 | 60 | 5 |
| 10 | "Sako" | 1 | 6 | 8 | 1 | 8 | 4 | 3 | 5 | 1 | 5 | 42 | 3 |
| 11 | "Let Me Cook" | 6 | 7 | 4 | 9 | 2 | 6 | 9 | 7 | 4 | 8 | 62 | 6 |

==== Controversies ====
Following Atikin's qualification to the final, public controversy emerged regarding the lyrics of his song "Deganti žemelė" and his past professional connections with Russia. Critics pointed to a specific phrase in the song which, according to political commentators, could be interpreted as reflecting narratives associated with Russia's position on the war in Ukraine. The debate intensified on social media, where some users called Atikin's removal from the competition; additional scrutiny arose due to his previous musical activities in Russia prior to 2022, including collaborations with Russian artists and performances held in the country. In response, Atikin stated that the song conveys themes of peace, love, and hope and denied supporting the Russian aggression against Ukraine, emphasizing that his earlier professional ties were non-political and occurred before the full-scale invasion. During the final, Atikin's performance was met with booing by the audience.

During the fourth semi-final, the results presentation was interrupted. Following an approximately eight-minute commercial break, it was stated that the SMS votes had been recalculated after violations of the voting rules were detected. LRT did not specify which participant or participants were involved in the mentioned violations or how this affected the results.

In the wildcard round, each voter was allowed to vote only once; however, cases of system abuse were reported during the voting period. At the end of the voting window, available data indicated that Grete had received 48% of the votes, while Nøra Blu had obtained 36%. Following the removal of invalid votes, the final results showed Nøra Blu as the winner with 50% of the vote. A significant share of votes cast for Grete, including some later deemed invalid, was reported to be associated with social media campaigns encouraging users to vote against Nøra Blu after controversial comments about other contestants were made by the song's author, Raigardas Tautkus.

== At Eurovision ==
The Eurovision Song Contest 2026 took place at the Wiener Stadthalle in Vienna, Austria, and consisted of two semi-finals held on the respective dates of 12 and 14 May and the final on 16 May 2026. All nations with the exceptions of the host country and the "Big Four" (France, Germany, Italy and the United Kingdom) were required to qualify from one of two semi-finals in order to compete for the final; the top ten countries from each semi-final progressed to the final. On 12 January 2026, an allocation draw was held to determine which of the two semi-finals, as well as which half of the show, each country performed in; the European Broadcasting Union (EBU) split up the competing countries into different pots based on voting patterns from previous contests, with countries with favourable voting histories put into the same pot.

=== Semi final ===
Lithuania was allocated for the first semi final, and later, was announced to perform in position twelve during the show. Shortly after, the qualification–announcement segment took place, and, at the end of the segment Lithuania was announced as one of the ten qualifiers, therefore, Lithuania would move on onto the final.

=== Final ===
Lithuania performed in the second half of the final. It placed 22nd overall, 23rd in the jury and 19th in the televote.

=== Voting ===
==== Points awarded to Lithuania ====
Points awarded by Lithuania (Semi-final 1)
| Score | Televote | Jury |
|---|---|---|
| 12 points | | |
| 10 points | | |
| 8 points | | Finland |
| 7 points | | Italy; Portugal |
| 6 points | Estonia; Georgia; Rest of the World | Poland |
| 5 points | Finland; Montenegro; Poland; Sweden | |
| 4 points | | Belgium |
| 3 points | Germany; Moldova; Serbia | Croatia; Estonia; Germany |
| 2 points | Belgium; Portugal; San Marino | Greece; Moldova |
| 1 point | Greece; Italy | Georgia |

Points awarded by Lithuania (Final)
| Score | Televote | Jury |
|---|---|---|
| 12 points | Latvia | |
| 10 points | | |
| 8 points | | Finland |
| 7 points | | |
| 6 points | | |
| 5 points | | |
| 4 points | | |
| 3 points | | |
| 2 points | | Italy |
| 1 point | | |

==== Points awarded by Lithuania ====
Points awarded by Lithuania (Semi-final 1)
| Score | Televote | Jury |
|---|---|---|
| 12 points | Serbia | Poland |
| 10 points | Poland | Israel |
| 8 points | Estonia | Sweden |
| 7 points | Moldova | Portugal |
| 6 points | Finland | Moldova |
| 5 points | Israel | Finland |
| 4 points | Portugal | Estonia |
| 3 points | Croatia | Belgium |
| 2 points | Greece | Greece |
| 1 point | Sweden | Croatia |

Points awarded by Lithuania (Final)
| Score | Televote | Jury |
|---|---|---|
| 12 points | Bulgaria | Bulgaria |
| 10 points | Romania | Poland |
| 8 points | Italy | Israel |
| 7 points | Ukraine | Norway |
| 6 points | Denmark | Sweden |
| 5 points | Moldova | Finland |
| 4 points | Finland | Denmark |
| 3 points | Poland | Moldova |
| 2 points | Australia | Czechia |
| 1 point | Serbia | France |

==== Detailed voting results ====
Each participating broadcaster assembles a seven-member jury panel consisting of music industry professionals who are citizens of the country they represent and two of which have to be between 18 and 25 years old. Each jury, and individual jury member, is required to meet a strict set of criteria regarding professional background, as well as diversity in gender and age. No member of a national jury was permitted to be related in any way to any of the competing acts in such a way that they cannot vote impartially and independently. The individual rankings of each jury member as well as the nation's televoting results were released shortly after the grand final.

The following members comprised the Lithuanian jury:

- Benas Kukenys
- Darius Dapkus
- Marijanas Staniulėnas
- Rokas Jančiauskas
- Justė Komskytė Vaiciekiūtė
- Kamilė Tumelytė
- Paulina Skrabytė

Detailed voting results from Lithuania (Semi-final 1)
| R/O | Country | Jury | | | | | | | | | Televote | |
| R/O | Country | Juror A | Juror B | Juror C | Juror D | Juror E | Juror F | Juror G | Rank | Points | Rank | Points |
|---|---|---|---|---|---|---|---|---|---|---|---|---|
| 01 | Moldova | 6 | 2 | 9 | 4 | 3 | 9 | 11 | 5 | 6 | 4 | 7 |
| 02 | Sweden | 7 | 3 | 5 | 3 | 2 | 7 | 10 | 3 | 8 | 10 | 1 |
| 03 | Croatia | 3 | 6 | 10 | 8 | 11 | 10 | 12 | 10 | 1 | 8 | 3 |
| 04 | Greece | 9 | 13 | 2 | 9 | 10 | 5 | 13 | 9 | 2 | 9 | 2 |
| 05 | Portugal | 4 | 10 | 8 | 7 | 9 | 3 | 2 | 4 | 7 | 7 | 4 |
| 06 | Georgia | 11 | 14 | 14 | 14 | 14 | 14 | 14 | 14 | | 14 | |
| 07 | Finland | 13 | 7 | 3 | 6 | 6 | 4 | 5 | 6 | 5 | 5 | 6 |
| 08 | Montenegro | 12 | 11 | 12 | 12 | 8 | 11 | 7 | 12 | | 12 | |
| 09 | Estonia | 8 | 8 | 4 | 10 | 4 | 12 | 3 | 7 | 4 | 3 | 8 |
| 10 | Israel | 2 | 5 | 7 | 2 | 5 | 1 | 8 | 2 | 10 | 6 | 5 |
| 11 | Belgium | 10 | 4 | 11 | 5 | 7 | 6 | 6 | 8 | 3 | 11 | |
| 12 | Lithuania | | | | | | | | | | | |
| 13 | San Marino | 14 | 9 | 13 | 13 | 12 | 8 | 9 | 13 | | 13 | |
| 14 | Poland | 1 | 1 | 1 | 1 | 1 | 2 | 1 | 1 | 12 | 2 | 10 |
| 15 | Serbia | 5 | 12 | 6 | 11 | 13 | 13 | 4 | 11 | | 1 | 12 |

Detailed voting results from Lithuania (Final)
| R/O | Country | Jury | | | | | | | | | Televote | |
| R/O | Country | Juror A | Juror B | Juror C | Juror D | Juror E | Juror F | Juror G | Rank | Points | Rank | Points |
|---|---|---|---|---|---|---|---|---|---|---|---|---|
| 01 | Denmark | 1 | 1 | 18 | 17 | 9 | 22 | 11 | 7 | 4 | 5 | 6 |
| 02 | Germany | 19 | 22 | 16 | 21 | 19 | 17 | 19 | 23 | | 24 | |
| 03 | Israel | 7 | 2 | 2 | 8 | 4 | 5 | 10 | 3 | 8 | 13 | |
| 04 | Belgium | 21 | 19 | 5 | 15 | 12 | 6 | 12 | 15 | | 22 | |
| 05 | Albania | 24 | 23 | 11 | 20 | 20 | 21 | 13 | 22 | | 19 | |
| 06 | Greece | 9 | 4 | 17 | 11 | 11 | 23 | 7 | 12 | | 14 | |
| 07 | Ukraine | 4 | 12 | 10 | 12 | 21 | 14 | 6 | 11 | | 4 | 7 |
| 08 | Australia | 16 | 7 | 12 | 7 | 10 | 15 | 18 | 16 | | 9 | 2 |
| 09 | Serbia | 14 | 24 | 15 | 16 | 8 | 20 | 21 | 19 | | 10 | 1 |
| 10 | Malta | 6 | 16 | 19 | 19 | 15 | 10 | 5 | 14 | | 16 | |
| 11 | Czechia | 10 | 10 | 14 | 10 | 13 | 7 | 2 | 9 | 2 | 15 | |
| 12 | Bulgaria | 22 | 5 | 13 | 1 | 1 | 1 | 1 | 1 | 12 | 1 | 12 |
| 13 | Croatia | 11 | 20 | 4 | 23 | 23 | 12 | 15 | 17 | | 20 | |
| 14 | United Kingdom | 23 | 18 | 24 | 24 | 24 | 24 | 22 | 24 | | 18 | |
| 15 | France | 3 | 8 | 3 | 14 | 22 | 18 | 14 | 10 | 1 | 11 | |
| 16 | Moldova | 8 | 14 | 6 | 4 | 16 | 4 | 24 | 8 | 3 | 6 | 5 |
| 17 | Finland | 15 | 3 | 21 | 5 | 2 | 8 | 9 | 6 | 5 | 7 | 4 |
| 18 | Poland | 2 | 6 | 1 | 9 | 5 | 2 | 4 | 2 | 10 | 8 | 3 |
| 19 | Lithuania | | | | | | | | | | | |
| 20 | Sweden | 13 | 15 | 9 | 2 | 17 | 3 | 3 | 5 | 6 | 17 | |
| 21 | Cyprus | 18 | 21 | 23 | 22 | 6 | 19 | 17 | 18 | | 21 | |
| 22 | Italy | 12 | 13 | 20 | 13 | 18 | 16 | 20 | 20 | | 3 | 8 |
| 23 | Norway | 5 | 9 | 8 | 3 | 3 | 13 | 8 | 4 | 7 | 12 | |
| 24 | Romania | 20 | 11 | 7 | 6 | 7 | 9 | 23 | 13 | | 2 | 10 |
| 25 | Austria | 17 | 17 | 22 | 18 | 14 | 11 | 16 | 21 | | 23 | |
