= Lithuania in the Eurovision Song Contest 2025 =

- Eurovision Song Contest 2025
- Participating broadcaster: Lithuanian National Radio and Television (LRT)
- Country: Lithuania
- Selection process: Eurovizija.LT 2025
- Selection date: 15 February 2025

Competing entry
- Song: "Tavo akys"
- Artist: Katarsis
- Songwriter: Lukas Radzevičius

Placement
- Semi-final result: Qualified (6th, 103 points)
- Final result: 16th, 96 points

Participation chronology

Lithuania was represented at the Eurovision Song Contest 2025 with the song "Tavo akys", written by Lukas Radzevičius and performed by the band Katarsis. The Lithuanian participating broadcaster, the Lithuanian National Radio and Television (LRT), organised the national final Eurovizija.LT 2025 to select its entry for the contest.

Lithuania was drawn to compete in the second semi-final of the Eurovision Song Contest which took place on 15 May 2025 and was later selected to perform in position 8. At the end of the show, "Tavo akys" was announced among the top 10 entries of the second semi-final and hence qualified to compete in the final, marking a fifth consecutive qualification for the country. It was later revealed that Lithuania placed sixth out of the sixteen participating countries in the semi-final with 103 points. In the final, Lithuania performed in position 5 and placed sixteenth out of the 26 participating countries, scoring a total of 96 points.

== Background ==
Prior to 2025, the Lithuanian National Radio and Television (LRT) had participated in the Eurovision Song Contest representing Lithuania twenty-four times since its debut in 1994. Its best placing was achieved in 2006, with the song "We Are the Winners" performed by LT United, which finished in sixth place in the final. Since the introduction of semi-finals in 2004, LRT has managed to qualify for the final thirteen times. It was represented in 2024 by the song "Luktelk", performed by Silvester Belt, who qualified for the final and finished 14th overall with 90 points.

As part of its duties as participating broadcaster, LRT organises the selection of its entry in the Eurovision Song Contest and broadcasts the event in the country. LRT has used a national final to select all of its Eurovision entries, with the exception of its debut entry in 1994. Between 2020 and 2023, the national final format Pabandom iš naujo! was used to select its entry. In 2024, LRT introduced a new format, titled Eurovizija.LT. LRT confirmed its intention to participate in the 2025 contest in mid-June 2024; two months later, the broadcaster started accepting applications for Eurovizija.LT 2025.

== Before Eurovision ==
=== Eurovizija.LT 2025 ===
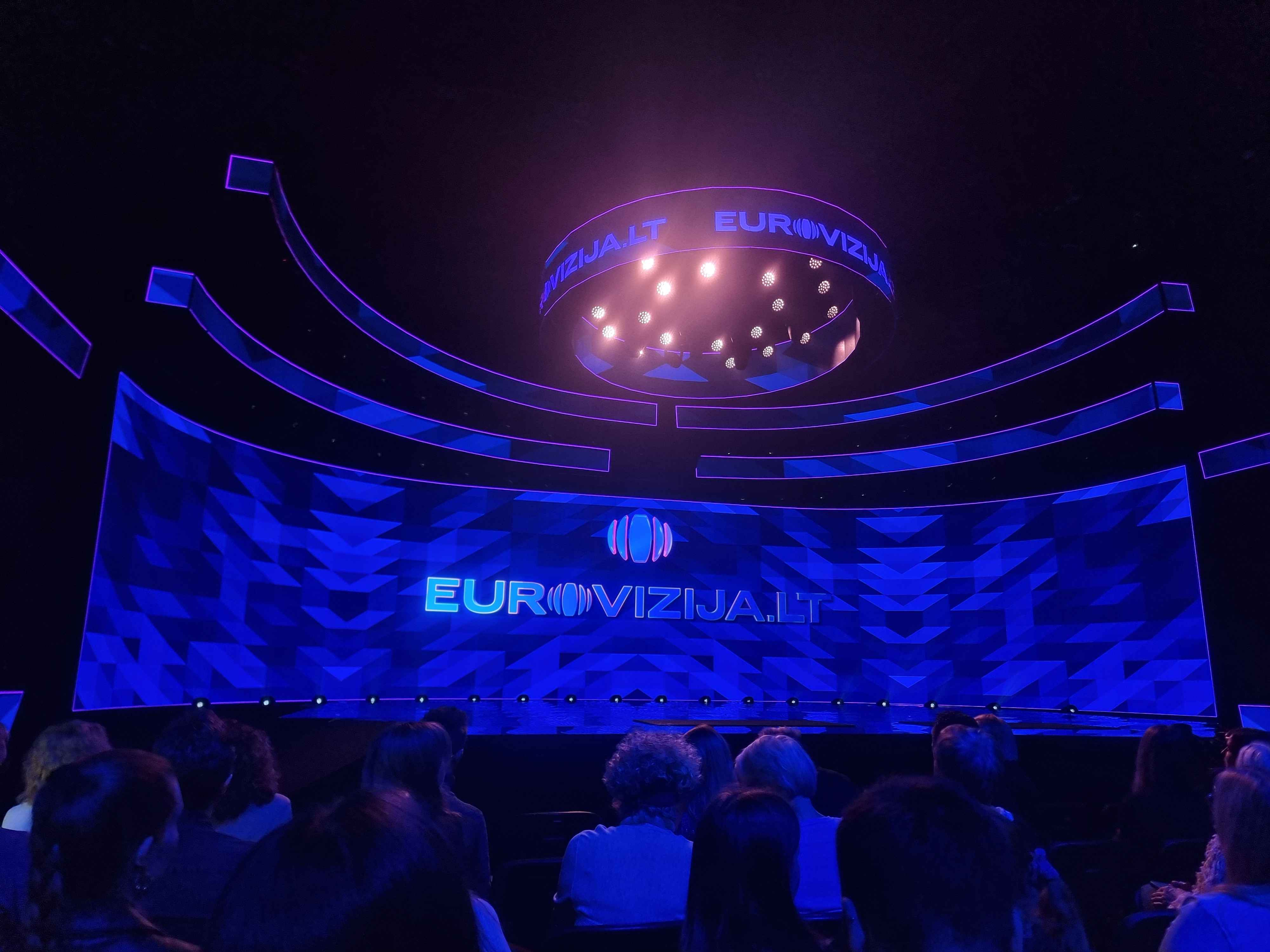
Eurovizija.LT stage during the semi-finals

Eurovizija.LT 2025 was the national final format organized by LRT to select its entry for the Eurovision Song Contest 2025. It was held between 11 January and 15 February 2025 and was hosted by Gabrielė Martirosian, Nombeko Augustė Khotseng, and Rimvydas Černiauskas. The shows were broadcast on LRT televizija and LRT Lituanica, as well as online via the broadcaster's website lrt.lt and official LRT YouTube channel.

==== Format ====
The competition saw 44 entries compete across five semi-finals, held between 11 January and 8 February 2024, and a final on 15 February 2024. A 50/50 combination of jury and public vote determined the ranking in each phase, with the top two entries from each semi-final (out of the nine total) qualifying for the final; the top three entries from the final moving on to a final televoting round selecting the winner. In case of a tie in any of the previous stages, the jury ranking would take precedence. The score system was the same used at the Eurovision Song Contest: the top ten entries from each of the jury vote and the televote are assigned 1–8, 10 and 12 points.

Performances for the semi-finals were pre-recorded, while they were delivered live in the final.

==== Competing entries ====
On 13 August 2024, LRT opened a submission platform for interested artists, lasting until 11 November 2024, later the deadline was extended to 25 November 2024. Each applicant could only submit one entry. Performers were required to be citizens of the European Union who have a permanent residence permit in Lithuania, while songwriters could be of any nationality, though citizens of countries "hostile to Lithuania" were not allowed to submit entries. The selected artists are able to withdraw until 20 December 2024. 81 entries were submitted at the conclusion of the submission period.

On 11 December 2024, the list of the 45 participating artists and songs was released by LRT. On 13 December, Evelina Gancewska was disqualified from the competition as her competing song "Aurora" had already made the line-up of the Croatian national selection, Dora 2025, and was replaced by Austėja Lukaitė, who later withdrew from the competition herself because she was unable to attend the filming of her semi-final due to a flu. Among the selected competing artists were Vilija and Ieva Zasimauskaitė, who represented Lithuania in 2014 and 2018, respectively. Gebrasy, Indrė and Laimonas (as part of Il Senso), Justinas Lapatinskas, Liepa, Lion Ceccah (formerly known as Alen Chicco), Mario Junes, Petunija, Queens of Roses and Siga (as part of Žalvarinis) have all competed in previous editions of the Lithuanian national selection and advanced to the final.

Entry withdrawn Replacement entry, later withdrawn

Artist	Song	Songwriter(s)
Aistay	"Meilę sapnavau"	Aistė Tomkevičiūtė-Pajaujienė; Elad Lahmany; Monika Arbutavičienė
Amari	"Sirens Call"	Paulius Stanulionis; Vitalij Puzyriov; Marija Jogminė; Justinas Jogminas
Amoralu	"Freedom"	Lukrecija Vasiliauskaitė; Viktorija Krivickaitė; Rokas Mikaliūnas; Deimantas Tumas
Anyanya	"Running Out of Time"	Anyanya Udongwo; Serhii Yeromenko; Timothy Akuboh; Judah Chima
Austėja Lukaitė	"Kas esu be tavęs?"	Žilvinas Žusinas
Black Biceps	"Visaip man reik"	Vitalij Valentinovič
Donata	"Empower"	Ylva Persson; Linda Persson; Janne Hyöty
Euften	"Goodbye Hell"	Rafael Artesero; José Juan Santana; Elvinas Skliutas
~~Evelina Gancewska~~	~~"Aurora"~~	Valentina Gyerek; Ylva Persson; Linda Persson
Ewa	"Tell Me Lie"	Eva Navickaitė
Freya Alley	"Lalala"	Kamilė Balčytytė; Laurence Hobbs
Gebrasy	"Whole"	Titas Astafejevas; Audrius Petrauskas
Gøya	"After Storm"	Marija Grabštaitė; Marijus Adomaitis
Godo Yorke	"<3 neparodai"	Goda Sasnauskaitė; Paulius Večeris; Nadiia Sazonova; Pedro Joaquim Borges
Halummi	"The Flame"	Kotryna Zaskevičiūtė; Pablo Lago
Hansanova	"Leilydo"	Giedrius Balčiūnas
Ieva Zasimauskaitė	"Don't You Ever Leave Me"	Ieva Zasimauskaitė; Donatas Kelmelis
Indrė and Laimonas	"Namo"	Stanislavas Stavickis
Jokūbas Jankauskas	"Far Away"	Jokūbas Jankauskas
Joseph June	"Ko man nesakei"	Vytautas Gumbelevičius
Justė Baradulinaitė	"Tired"	Titas Astafejevas; Audrius Petrauskas
Justinas	"Alright"	Titas Astafejevas; Audrius Petrauskas
Káro	"Love Bug"	Karolė Virbickaitė; Peder Etholm Idsoe
Katarsis	"Tavo akys"	Lukas Radzevičius
Liepa	"Ar mylėtum"	Elena Jurgaitytė; Nombeko Augustė Khotseng (Note: Introduced as KHot during broadcast)
Lion Ceccah	"Drobė"	Tomas Alenčikas; Aurimas Galvelis
Lit	"You're Not Alone"	Justinas Chachlauskas; Raigardas Tautkus; Frederik Nnaji
Mantas Ben	"Svajonės po 12"	Mantas Bendžius
Mario Junes	"Bury Me"	Marius Kijauskas; Faustas Venckus
Matas Ligeika	"Saule"	Matas Ligeika; Nombeko Augustė Khotseng; Rokas Jančiauskas
Matt Len	"Not Alone"	Matas Lenktis; Vitalij Rodevič
Meidė	"Gyvatės"	Meidė Šlamaitė; Paulius Vaicekauskas
Noy	"Just Take Me on a Date"	Nojus Žebrauskas; Alvydas Mačiulskas
Ofelija	"Širdelė"	Liepa Maknavičiūtė
Petunija	"Į saldumą"	Kęstutis Vaitkevičius; Agnė Šiaulytė-Vaitkevičė
Queens of Roses	"Taip!"	Elena Jurgaitytė; Nombeko Augustė Khotseng
Rūta Budreckaitė	"Tai kur namai"	Dovydas Lazdinis; Rūta Budreckaitė
Siga	"Walking with My Shadow"	Sigita Jonynaitė-Žostautienė
Sophie Ali	"The Bluest Bell"	Gytis Valickas; Jokūbas Tulaba; Sophie Ali
Sun Francisco	"Atsimerkt"	Giedrė Ivanova; Maksimas Ivanovas
The Ditties	"Zui Zu Bi"	Veronika Čičinskaitė-Golovanova; Paulius Vaicekauskas
Thomas G	"Highest Goals"	Tomas Gailiūnas; Dovydas Lazdinis
Tomas Dirgėla	"Pašok"	Tomas Dirgėla; Germanas Skoris
Ustin	"You're the One"	Justinas Mejeris; Salomėja Vaisiūnaitė
Viktorija Faith	"Scary Beautiful"	Oskar Linderoth; Amy Hay; Aidan O'Connor; Dennis Svennebäck
Vilija	"Liesti negalima"	Vilija Matačiūnaitė

==== Jury members ====
Unlike last year, the jury members commented on the contestants' performances in all shows. The jury consisted of five people in the semi-finals, and 11 jury members participated in the final.

Jury members by show
Jury member	Semi-finals					Final	Occupation(s)
Jury member	1	2	3	4	5	Final	Occupation(s)
Ramūnas Zilnys	Yes	Yes	No	Yes	Yes	Yes	music reviewer, radio host, Eurovision commentator
Ieva Narkutė	Yes	Yes	Yes	No	No	Yes	singer-songwriter
Vytautas Bikus	No	Yes	Yes	Yes	No	Yes	composer, songwriter of Lithuanian entries in 2015 and 2018
Monika Liu	No	No	No	Yes	Yes	Yes	2022 Lithuanian representative
Leonas Somovas	Yes	No	Yes	No	No	Yes	producer and composer
Unė Liandzbergytė	Yes	No	No	No	Yes	Yes	radio host
Gerūta Griniūtė	No	No	Yes	No	Yes	Yes	radio host, former Eurovision commentator
Stanislavas Stavickis-Stano	Yes	Yes	No	No	No	No	singer-songwriter
Kamilė Gudmonaitė	No	Yes	No	Yes	No	No	theater director, singer, member of Kamanių Šilelis
Kristupas Naraškevičius	No	No	Yes	No	No	Yes	TV and radio host
Darius Užkuraitis	No	No	No	Yes	Yes	No	radio host, former Eurovision commentator
Vaidas Baumila	No	No	No	No	No	Yes	2015 Lithuanian representative
Inga Jankauskaitė	No	No	No	No	No	Yes	actress, singer-songwriter
Giedrė Kilčiauskienė	No	No	No	No	No	Yes	singer-songwriter

==== Semi-finals ====
The five semi-finals of the competition were filmed on 8, 14, 15, 20, and 21 January 2025 at the LRT studios in Vilnius and were aired on 11, 18, 25 January, 1, and 8 February 2025. In each semi-final, 9 of the 45 competing acts performed, with the top two entries progressing to the final.

After the results of the 5th semi-final, it was announced that Black Biceps and Liepa also qualified for the final as wildcards. Both artists received the most audience support from the contestants who did not make it to the finals, and they also only missed out on the finals due to jury tie-breakers.

Each semi-final opened with a performance of dancers staged by choreographer Marijanas Staniulėnas. In addition to the performances of the competing entries, interval acts performed:

- Gabrielius Vagelis performed "Pasilik" in the first semi-final;
- Stanislavas Stavickis-Stano and Edilija Nikartaitė-Geltona performed "Saulė" in the second semi-final;
- Rūta Mur with Leonas Somovas performed "Saugok širdį" in the third semi-final;
- Nombeko Augustė performed "Vaikštai per mane" in the fourth semi-final;
- Paulina Paukštaitytė performed "Pasilik Praeity" in the fifth semi-final.

Qualifier Wildcard qualifier Entry withdrawn

Semi-final 1 – 11 January 2025
R/O	Artist	Song	Jury	Televote		Total	Place
R/O	Artist	Song	Jury	Votes	Points	Total	Place
1	Lit	"You're Not Alone"	6	297	4	10	6
2	Mantas Ben	"Svajonės po 12"	8	384	6	14	3
3	Rūta Budreckaitė	"Tai kur namai"	4	706	8	12	5
4	Anyanya	"Running Out of Time"	12	1,058	12	24	1
5	Aistay	"Meilę sapnavau"	2	55	2	4	9
6	Ewa	"Tell Me Lie"	7	442	7	14	4
7	Viktorija Faith	"Scary Beautiful"	5	159	3	8	7
8	Justė Baradulinaitė	"Tired"	10	827	10	20	2
9	Euften	"Goodbye Hell"	3	299	5	8	8

Semi-final 2 – 18 January 2025
R/O	Artist	Song	Jury	Televote		Total	Place
R/O	Artist	Song	Jury	Votes	Points	Total	Place
1	Halummi	"The Flame"	6	427	5	11	5
2	Noy	"Just Take Me on a Date"	10	1,019	12	22	2
3	Jokūbas Jankauskas	"Far Away"	8	633	8	16	3
4	Petunija	"Į saldumą"	12	863	10	22	1
5	Freya Alley	"Lalala"	4	476	6	10	6
6	Káro	"Love Bug"	5	349	4	9	7
7	Vilija	"Liesti negalima"	7	610	7	14	4
8	Tomas Dirgėla	"Pašok"	3	236	3	6	8
—N/a	Austėja Lukaitė	"Kas esu be tavęs?"	Withdrew (Note: Austėja Lukaitė was originally supposed to compete in the second semi-final but she was unable to attend the filming due to a flu.)				

Semi-final 3 – 25 January 2025
R/O	Artist	Song	Jury	Televote		Total	Place
R/O	Artist	Song	Jury	Votes	Points	Total	Place
1	Amari	"Sirens Call"	3	426	5	8	7
2	Thomas G	"Highest Goals"	2	540	6	8	8
3	Queens of Roses	"Taip!"	7	544	7	14	4
4	Gøya	"After Storm"	10	1,220	10	20	2
5	Hansanova	"Leilydo"	4	304	3	7	9
6	Meidė	"Gyvatės"	5	424	4	9	5
7	Gebrasy	"Whole"	12	742	8	20	1
8	Indrė and Laimonas	"Namo"	6	272	2	8	6
9	Black Biceps	"Visaip man reik"	8	2,868	12	20	3

Semi-final 4 – 1 February 2025
R/O	Artist	Song	Jury	Televote		Total	Place
R/O	Artist	Song	Jury	Votes	Points	Total	Place
1	Siga	"Walking With My Shadow"	2	344	3	5	9
2	Ustin	"You're the One"	5	672	5	10	6
3	Godo Yorke	"<3 neparodai"	4	252	2	6	8
4	Joseph June	"Ko man nesakei?"	3	711	6	9	7
5	Amoralu	"Freedom"	10	820	7	17	2
6	Katarsis	"Tavo akys"	12	2,507	12	24	1
7	Liepa	"Ar mylėtum"	7	2,218	10	17	3
8	Mario Junes	"Bury Me"	6	573	4	10	5
9	The Ditties	"Zui zu bi"	8	1,254	8	16	4

Semi-final 5 – 8 February 2025
R/O	Artist	Song	Jury	Televote		Total	Place
R/O	Artist	Song	Jury	Votes	Points	Total	Place
1	Donata	"Empower"	6	283	5	11	5
2	Matas Ligeika	"Saule"	10	470	7	17	3
3	Ieva Zasimauskaitė	"Don't You Ever Leave Me"	7	635	8	15	4
4	Matt Len	"Not Alone"	5	290	6	11	6
5	Ofelija	"Širdelė"	4	121	3	7	7
6	Sun Francisco	"Atsimerkt"	3	125	4	7	8
7	Justinas	"Alright"	2	103	2	4	9
8	Sophie Ali	"The Bluest Bell"	8	1,271	10	18	2
9	Lion Ceccah	"Drobė"	12	1,993	12	24	1

==== Final ====
The live final of the competition took place on 15 February 2025 at the Žalgiris Arena in Kaunas. The final was opened by a performance of dancers staged by choreographer Marijanas Staniulėnas, followed by a parade of participants presenting all twelve finalists. In addition to the performances of the competing entries Rokas Yan performed medley of his songs (including a joint song with former Lithuanian representatives Monika Liu and Vaidas Baumila), Silvester Belt performed 2024 Lithuanian Eurovision entry "Luktelk" and Monika Marija, Gabrielius Vagelis, Vilius Popendikis and Nombeko Augustė Khotseng together performed medley of famous Eurovision songs as the interval acts. A combination of the votes of a jury (50%) and the public (50%) selected three songs for a superfinal, where a televoting round determined the winner.

Due to a technical error during the superfinal, most votes had not been counted at the time of reveal of the results. During the broadcast, it was stated that "Tavo akys" received 9,374 votes, that "Drobė" received 3,828, and that "Ar mylėtum" received 2,198 votes. Three days later, it was revealed that "Tavo akys" had received 15,889, "Drobė" had received 11,225, and "Ar mylėtum" had received 6,655 votes. Upon counting all the votes, the results of the superfinal remained the same.

Final – 15 February 2025
R/O	Artist	Song	Jury		Televote		Total	Place
R/O	Artist	Song	Votes	Points	Votes	Points	Total	Place
1	Noy	"Just Take Me on a Date"	15	0	589	0	0	12
2	Gøya	"After Storm"	77	6	2,389	5	11	6
3	Liepa	"Ar mylėtum"	79	7	6,964	7	14	3
4	Gebrasy	"Whole"	38	0	659	0	0	11
5	Amoralu	"Freedom"	101	8	2,298	4	12	5
6	Anyanya	"Running Out of Time"	68	2	3,046	6	8	7
7	Justė Baradulinaitė	"Tired"	40	1	915	1	2	10
8	Katarsis	"Tavo akys"	120	12	10,714	12	24	1
9	Petunija	"Į saldumą"	69	4	1,807	3	7	8
10	Sophie Ali	"The Bluest Bell"	68	3	1,726	2	5	9
11	Lion Ceccah	"Drobė"	113	10	7,964	10	20	2
12	Black Biceps	"Visaip man reik"	70	5	6,993	8	13	4

Superfinal – 15 February 2025
R/O	Artist	Song	Televote	Place
1	Katarsis	"Tavo akys"	15,889	1
2	Liepa	"Ar mylėtum"	6,655	3
3	Lion Ceccah	"Drobė"	11,255	2

== At Eurovision ==
Lithuania participated in the Second Semi-Final of the Eurovision Song Contest 2025 at St. Jakobshalle in Basel. In January, they were drawn to perform in the first half of the semi-final, and the producer later chose for them to perform eighth. On 15th May 2025, Lithuania qualified for the Grand Final, finishing 6th with 103 points.

In the Grand Final, Lithuania received 34 points from the juries and 62 points in the televote. They finished in 16th place with 96 points.

=== Voting ===
==== Points awarded to Lithuania ====
Points awarded to Lithuania (Semi-final 2)
Score	Televote
12 points	Latvia
10 points	Ireland; United Kingdom
8 points	Czechia; Georgia; Luxembourg
7 points	Germany
6 points	Denmark; Finland
5 points	France; Montenegro; Rest of the World; Serbia
4 points	Greece
3 points	
2 points	Malta
1 point	Armenia; Australia

Points awarded to Lithuania (Final)
Score	Televote	Jury
12 points	Ukraine	
10 points	Latvia	
8 points	Ireland; United Kingdom	
7 points		Latvia
6 points	Georgia; Poland	Poland; United Kingdom
5 points		Czechia
4 points	Luxembourg; Norway	Netherlands
3 points		Montenegro; San Marino
2 points	Denmark	
1 point	Estonia; Finland	

==== Points awarded by Lithuania ====
Points awarded by Lithuania (Semi-final 2)
Score	Televote
12 points	Latvia
10 points	Israel
8 points	Austria
7 points	Finland
6 points	Australia
5 points	Armenia
4 points	Denmark
3 points	Georgia
2 points	Ireland
1 point	Luxembourg

Points awarded by Lithuania (Final)
Score	Televote	Jury
12 points	Latvia	Latvia
10 points	Estonia	Italy
8 points	Germany	Netherlands
7 points	Ukraine	Estonia
6 points	Italy	Portugal
5 points	Austria	Germany
4 points	Sweden	Austria
3 points	Israel	Switzerland
2 points	Norway	Ukraine
1 point	Netherlands	Sweden

==== Detailed voting results ====
Each participating broadcaster assembles a five-member jury panel consisting of music industry professionals who are citizens of the country they represent. Each jury, and individual jury member, is required to meet a strict set of criteria regarding professional background, as well as diversity in gender and age. No member of a national jury was permitted to be related in any way to any of the competing acts in such a way that they cannot vote impartially and independently. The individual rankings of each jury member as well as the nation's televoting results were released shortly after the grand final.

The following members comprised the Lithuanian jury:

- Pijus Vasiliauskas-Brazauskas
- Vaidotas Stackevičius
- Eglė Kernagytė Dambrauskė
- Raminta Naujanytė
- Rosita Čivilytė

Detailed voting results from Lithuania (Semi-final 2)
R/O	Country	Televote	
R/O	Country	Rank	Points
01	Australia	5	6
02	Montenegro	15	
03	Ireland	9	2
04	Latvia	1	12
05	Armenia	6	5
06	Austria	3	8
07	Greece	12	
08	Lithuania		
09	Malta	13	
10	Georgia	8	3
11	Denmark	7	4
12	Czechia	11	
13	Luxembourg	10	1
14	Israel	2	10
15	Serbia	14	
16	Finland	4	7

Detailed voting results from Lithuania (Final)
R/O	Country	Jury							Televote	
R/O	Country	Juror A	Juror B	Juror C	Juror D	Juror E	Rank	Points	Rank	Points
01	Norway	14	19	14	19	19	23		9	2
02	Luxembourg	19	20	17	20	10	21		20	
03	Estonia	4	4	5	9	9	4	7	2	10
04	Israel	11	14	22	12	14	17		8	3
05	Lithuania									
06	Spain	18	18	18	10	18	19		24	
07	Ukraine	9	6	6	5	11	9	2	4	7
08	United Kingdom	17	7	9	17	23	14		25	
09	Austria	7	11	11	2	5	7	4	6	5
10	Iceland	22	17	10	24	16	20		14	
11	Latvia	2	1	3	1	4	1	12	1	12
12	Netherlands	12	10	2	14	2	3	8	10	1
13	Finland	21	8	12	8	17	13		11	
14	Italy	1	2	1	4	8	2	10	5	6
15	Poland	16	13	21	16	20	22		15	
16	Germany	20	3	13	13	1	6	5	3	8
17	Greece	10	25	23	7	22	15		21	
18	Armenia	6	12	16	18	12	12		18	
19	Switzerland	5	15	7	3	13	8	3	17	
20	Malta	25	23	25	25	25	25		23	
21	Portugal	3	5	4	11	15	5	6	12	
22	Denmark	15	22	15	15	21	24		22	
23	Sweden	23	21	8	21	3	10	1	7	4
24	France	13	16	19	6	6	11		16	
25	San Marino	24	24	20	22	7	18		19	
26	Albania	8	9	24	23	24	16		13	
