= Lion Ceccah =

Lithuanian singer-songwriter (born 1991)

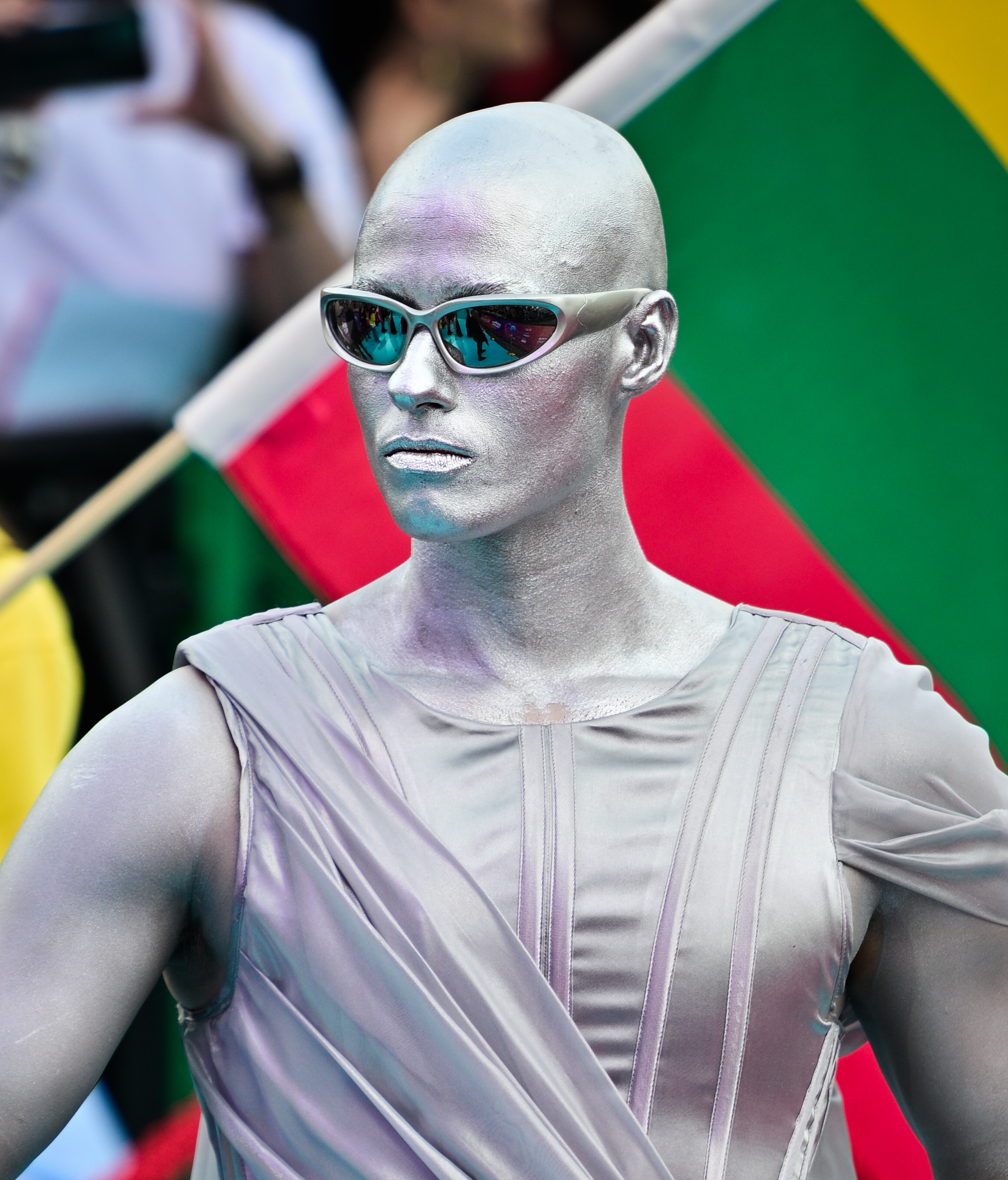
- Lion Ceccah in 2026

Background information
- Born: Tomas Alenčikas; 1 August 1991 (age 35); Vilnius, Lithuania
- Genres: Art pop; dance-pop
- Occupations: Singer; songwriter
- Years active: 2011–present

Tomas Alenčikas (born 1 August 1991), known by his stage name Lion Ceccah (/ˌlaɪən ˈsikə/) and previously as Alen Chicco, is a Lithuanian singer and songwriter. He represented Lithuania in the Eurovision Song Contest 2026 with his song "Sólo quiero más", finishing in 22nd place.

== Life ==
Three years after graduating from Vasily Kachalov High School and Karoliniškės Music School in Vilnius, he began studying at the Department of Performing Arts of Vilnius College, graduating with a Bachelor of Arts in Musical Theatre. He then completed a Master's degree at the Music Academy of Vytautas Magnus University in Kaunas. He became one of the most prominent figures in the Lithuanian drag scene.

Ceccah has participated in Eurovizija.LT multiple times, scoring second place in 2025 with the song "Drobė", behind Katarsis. In 2026, he won Eurovizija.LT and participated in Eurovision for Lithuania, placing 22nd in the final.

== Discography ==
=== Extended plays ===
- Post-Eurovision (2026)

=== Singles ===
Title	Year
"Aš čia"	2018
"Your Cure"	2019
"Sexy Song"	2019
"This Is Where I End My Doubts"	2019
"Humana"	2019
"Somewhere Out There"	2020
"Lithuanian Queen"	2020
"Vilnius"	2019
"Kelias"	2019
"Mūsų lietuva"	2019
"Wanna Know"	2019
"Wanna Know"	2022
"Do You?"	2023
"Killer on this Beat"	2024
"Drobė"	2025

=== Charted singles ===
List of charted singles, showing year released, chart positions and album name
Title	Year	Peak chart positions		Album
Title	Year	LTU	LTU Air.	Album
"Sólo quiero más"	2026	2	83	Non-album single

Awards and achievements
Preceded by Katarsis with "Tavo akys"	Lithuania in the Eurovision Song Contest; 2026	Succeeded by TBD
