= Katarsis (band) =

Lithuanian post–punk band

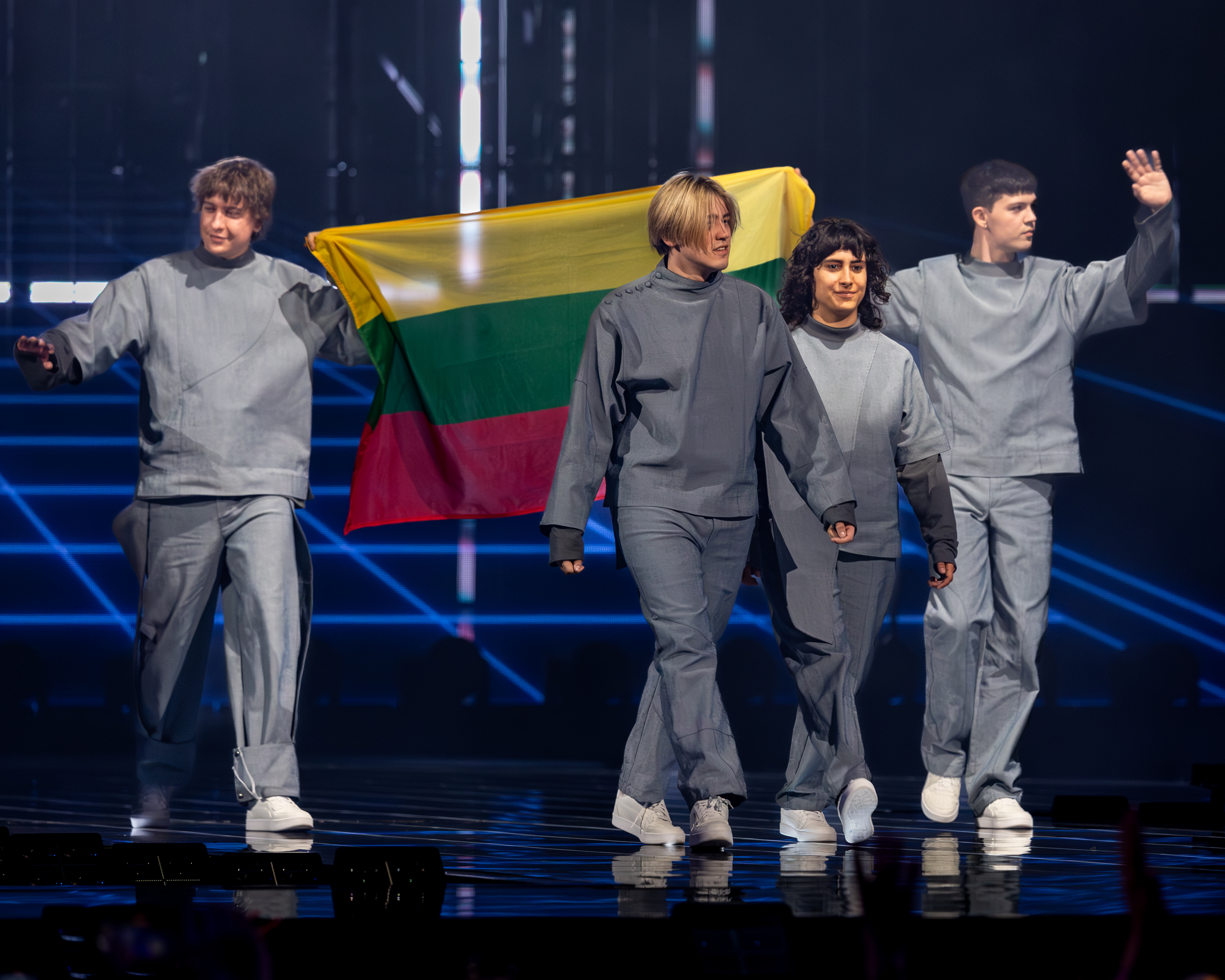
- Katarsis during a flag parade at the Eurovision Song Contest 2025.

Background information
- Origin: Vilnius, Lithuania
- Genres: Alternative rock, post-punk
- Years active: 2019–present
- Members: Lukas Radzevičius; Alanas Brasas; Jokūbas Andriulis
- Past members: Emilija Kandratavičiūtė (Note: despite her departure, Emilija performed at the M.A.M.A. Awards and Eurovizija.LT in February 2026.); Andrius Gruodis; Smiltė Linkauskaitė; Eivin Laukhammer; Saulius Zalieskis; Mantas Ralas

Band logo

Katarsis (Lithuanian: [kɐˈtaːrsʲɪs]) is a Lithuanian alternative rock band formed in Vilnius currently consisting of Lukas Radzevičius (lead vocalist, guitar), Alanas Brasas (lead guitar) and Jokūbas Andriulis (drummer). They represented Lithuania in the Eurovision Song Contest 2025 with the song "Tavo akys", finishing in 16th place in the final with 96 points.

== History ==
Katarsis started as a solo project of Lukas Radzevičius. In 2019, while still in school, Radzevičius began composing and releasing his own music. After receiving invitations to perform at concerts, he realized that he could not deliver live performances alone and subsequently formed a band with the same name.

In 2024, they released their debut EP, Dausos.

On 11 December 2024, Katarsis was announced as one of the forty-five contestants in Eurovizija.LT, Lithuania's national selection to select the country's entry in the Eurovision Song Contest 2025, with the song "Tavo akys". On 1 February 2025, they advanced to the semi-final stage, thus managing to advance to the final two weeks later. At the final of the event, "Tavo akys" was one of the three songs with the most votes received by the jury and at home, advancing to the superfinal, where the televote crowned it the winner and Lithuanian representative on the Eurovision stage in Basel. They received 96 points total – 64 from the public and the remaining 32 from the jury. Katarsis placed 16th overall in the final.

On 4 August 2025, Katarsis announced that they would embark on a European tour across the cities of Dublin, London, Stockholm, Warsaw, Helsinki, Berlin, Riga and Amsterdam, with the message: “We’re taking our music beyond borders and can’t wait to share it with you”. On 21 August 2025, they announced a stop in Tallinn as part of the tour.

On 22 September 2025, the band announced the name of their forthcoming debut album, Žiedlapis tau, (Petal for you), and a concert of the same name, to be played on 22 January 2026. The album was released on 16 January 2026.

On 6 February 2026, bassist Emilija Kandratavičiūtė left the band due to health reasons. The band has said that they will continue on as a trio.

== Band members ==
- Lukas Radzevičius (born 24 November 2002 in Klaipėda) – vocals, guitar (2019–present)
- Alanas Brasas (born 12 November 2001 in Šiauliai) – lead guitar (2023–present)
- Jokūbas Andriulis (born 28 March 1999 in Kaunas) – drums (2022–present)

=== Former members ===
- Saulius Zalieskis – drums (2021)
- Smiltė Linkauskaitė – bass (2021–2022)
- Andrius Gruodis (born 5 May 2000 in Klaipėda) – lead guitar (2021–2023)
- Mantas Ralas – lead guitar (2023)
- Eivin Laukhammer – drums (2022)
- Emilija Kandratavičiūtė (born 26 August 2002 in Ariogala) – bass (2022–2026)

== Discography ==
=== Studio albums ===
Title	Details	Peak chart positions
Title	Details	LTU
Žiedlapis tau	Released: 16 January 2026; Label: Self-released; Formats: Physical, digital download, streaming	3

=== Extended plays ===
Title	Details
Dausos	Released: 24 May 2024; Label: Self-released; Formats: Physical, digital download, streaming

=== Singles ===
==== As lead artist ====
Title	Year	Peak chart positions			Certifications	Album or EP
Title	Year	LTU	LTU Air.	GRE Intl.	Certifications	Album or EP
"Tiems kurių niekaip rasti negaliu"	2019	—	—	—		Non-album single
"Dega"	2019	—	—	—		Non-album single
"Niekas"	2020	96	—	—		Non-album singles
"Vasarą galvoj minoras"	2020	4	—	—	AGATA: Gold	Non-album singles
"Siluetai"	2020	—	—	—		Non-album singles
"Spengia galvoje"	2020	75	—	—		Non-album singles
"Rasa"	2022	—	—	—		Non-album singles
"Des"	2022	44	—	—		Non-album singles
"Ėda"	2023	—	—	—		Non-album singles
"Būsi"	2023	—	—	—		Non-album singles
"Praradau tave"	2023	20	—	—		Non-album single
"Paleisiu"	2024	—	—	—		Dausos
"Pamiršau žiūrėt į paukščius"	2024	41	—	—		Dausos
"Tyla"	2024	—	—	—		Dausos
"Nebeturiu jėgų"	2024	—	—	—		Dausos
"Ji netikra"	2024	—	—	—		Dausos
"Dingo"	2024	—	—	—		Non-album single
"Tavo akys"	2025	1	90	43		Žiedlapis tau
"Balta meilė"	2025	3	—	—		Non-album single
"Kas man be jūros"	2025	32	—	—		Žiedlapis tau
"Žiedlapis tau"	2026	—	—	—		Žiedlapis tau
"Likę tik randai"	2026	85	—	—		Žiedlapis tau
"Kada"	2026	—	—	—		Žiedlapis tau
"Laikei tu mane"	2026	—	—	—		Žiedlapis tau
"Neleisk man"	2026	68	—	—		Žiedlapis tau
"Malda"	2026	—	—	—		Žiedlapis tau
"Nebepaleidžia"	2026	—	—	—		Žiedlapis tau
"Surasiu"	2026	—	—	—		Žiedlapis tau
"Tu matei"	2026	—	—	—		Non-album single
"—" denotes a recording that did not chart or was not released in that territory.

==== As featured artist ====
Title	Year	Peak chart positions	Album or EP
Title	Year	LTU	Album or EP
"Išliesiu" (with Jauti)	2025	94	Meilė

=== Other charted songs ===
Title	Year	Peak chart positions	Album or EP
Title	Year	LTU	Album or EP
"Likę tik randai"	2026	85	Žiedlapis tau
"Neleisk man"	2026	68	Žiedlapis tau

== Awards and nominations ==
Year	Award	Category	Nominee(s)	Result	Ref.
2025	Eurovision Awards	Onstage Ensemble	Themselves	Nominated	
2025	M1 Music Awards	Group of the Year	Themselves	Nominated	
2025	M1 Music Awards	Breakthrough of the Year	Themselves	Nominated	
2025	M1 Music Awards	Alternative of the Year	Themselves	Won	
2025	M1 Music Awards	Nostalgia of the Year	Balta meilė	Nominated	
2025	M1 Music Awards	Hit of the Year	"Tavo akys"	Nominated	
2026	M.A.M.A. Awards	Song of the Year	"Tavo akys"	Nominated	
2026	M.A.M.A. Awards	M.A.M.A. Top 40	"Tavo akys"	Won	
2026	M.A.M.A. Awards	M.A.M.A. Top 40	"Kas man be jūros"	Nominated	
2026	M.A.M.A. Awards	Breakthrough of the Year	Themselves	Won	
2026	M.A.M.A. Awards	Rock Band/Artist of the Year	Themselves	Nominated	

== Notes ==
Awards and achievements
Preceded by Silvester Belt with "Luktelk"	Lithuania in the Eurovision Song Contest; 2025	Succeeded by Lion Ceccah with "Sólo quiero más"
