= Silvester Belt =

Lithuanian singer (born 1997)

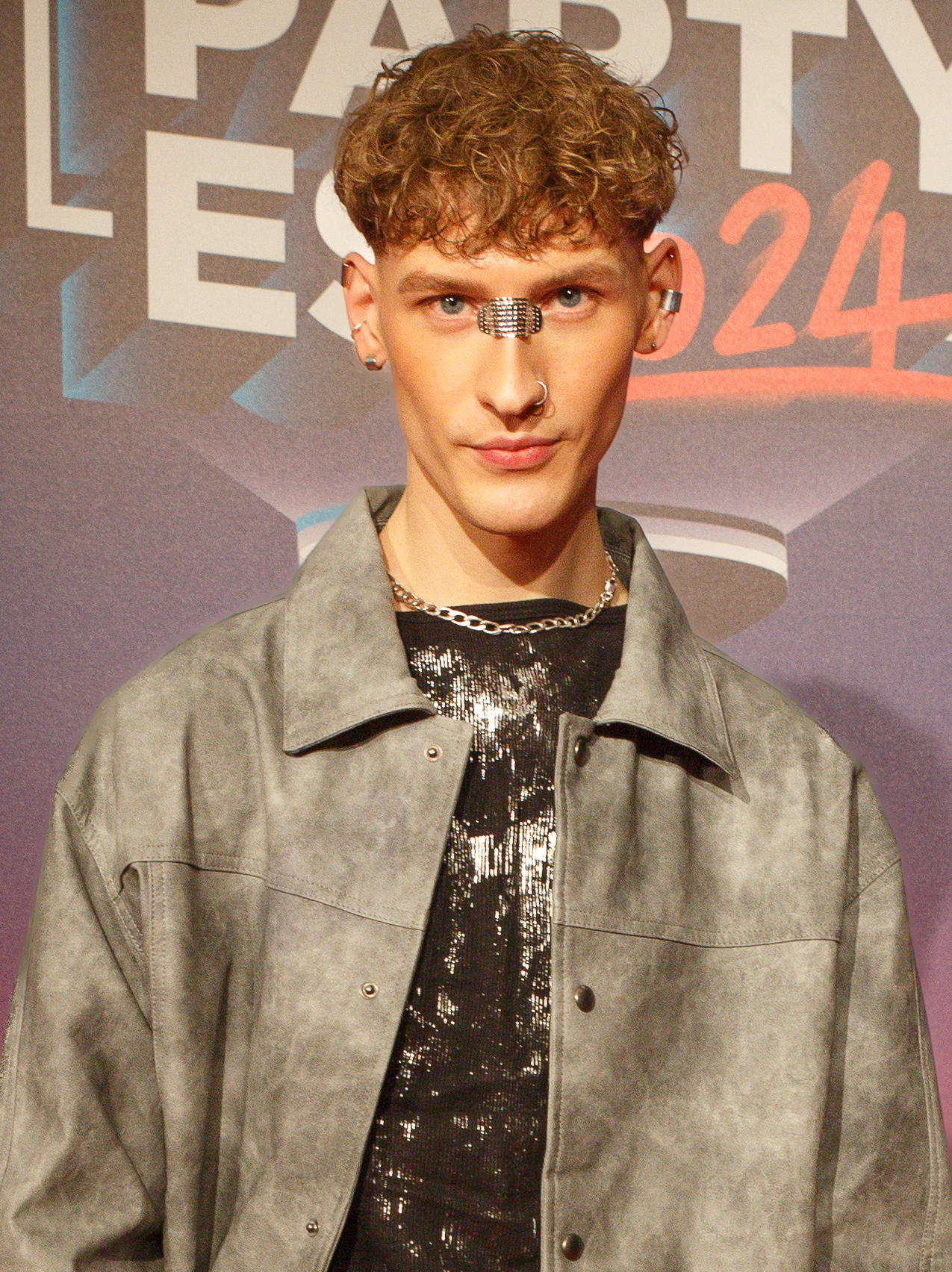
- Belt in 2024

Background information
- Born: Silvestras Beltė; 26 November 1997 (age 28); Kaunas, Lithuania
- Genres: Pop; electronic; rave
- Occupations: Singer; songwriter
- Years active: 2010–present
- Label: OpenPlay

Silvestras Beltė (Lithuanian pronunciation: [sʲɪlʲˈvʲɛstrɐs ˈbʲɛlʲtʲeː], born 26 November 1997), professionally known as Silvester Belt, is a Lithuanian singer and songwriter. He represented Lithuania at the Eurovision Song Contest 2024 with the song "Luktelk".

== Early life ==
Beltė was born in Kaunas, Lithuania. At the age of four, he developed an interest in music and began to attend music school. After his graduation, he continued his studies at the Juozas Gruodis Conservatory in Kaunas.

In 2019, he graduated from the University of Westminster in London with a degree in Commercial Music Performance. After graduation, he began working in a beauty salon. In January 2021, he returned to Lithuania where he signed with a record label; initially, he intended to return to London, but could not due to quarantine regulations.

== Career ==
In 2010, Beltė competed in Vaikų Eurovizijos nacionalinė atranka, the Lithuanian preselection for the Junior Eurovision Song Contest 2010. He performed the song "Pi-pa-po" and qualified to the final, later placing 8th out of 12 finalists.

In 2017, after being encouraged by his sister to apply, Beltė competed and later won the Lithuanian reality competition television show Aš – superhitas (I Am a Superhit). Upon winning, he moved from his hometown to Vilnius, where he later released his debut single, "Noise". Shortly after winning the show, he worked behind the scenes of the television show 2 Barai, the Lithuanian counterpart of the reality competition The Bar. The following year, he competed in the sixth season of X Faktorius, the Lithuanian version of The X Factor, where he was eliminated in the fourth week.

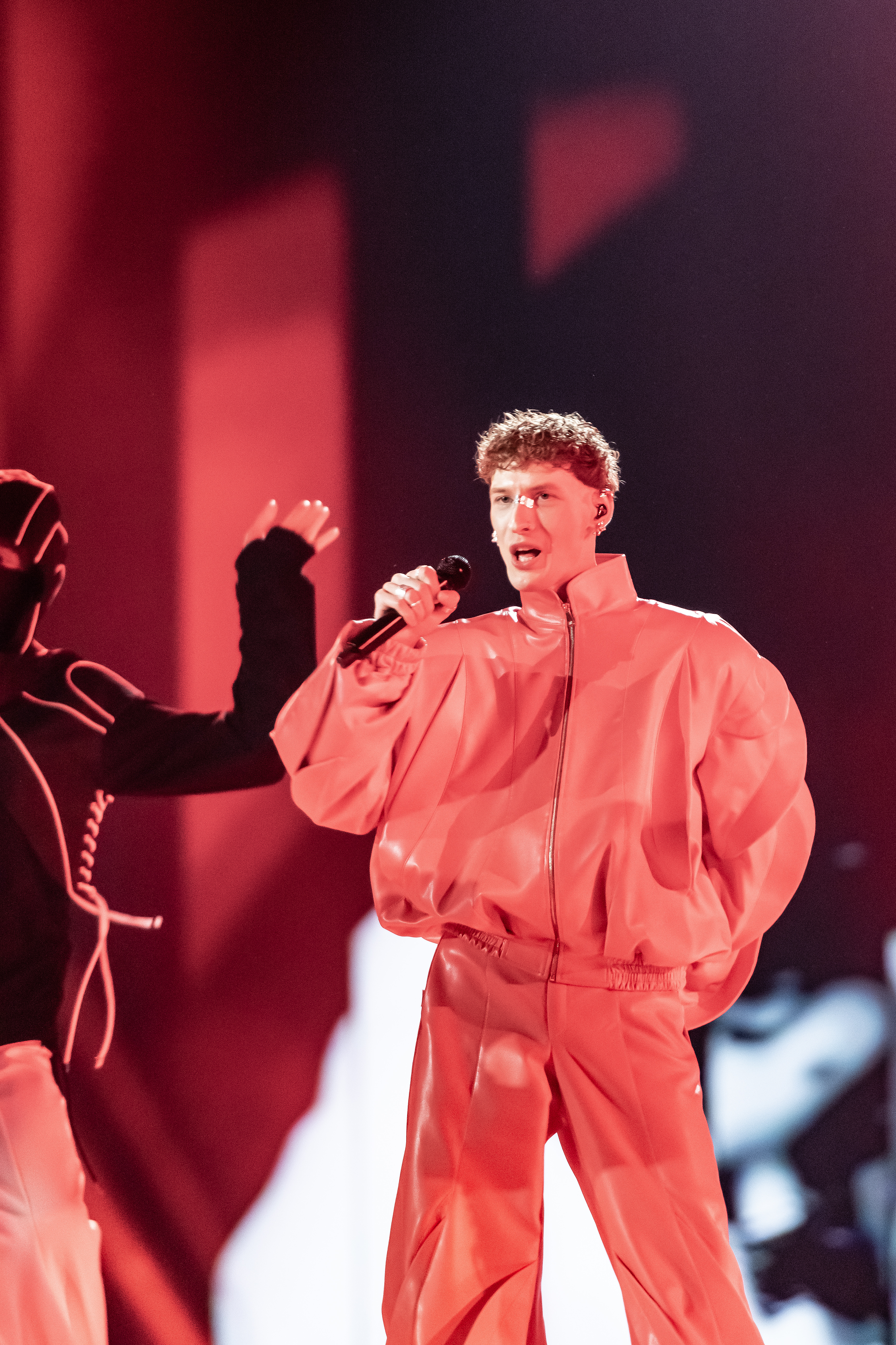
Silvester Belt at the Eurovision Song Contest 2024

On 19 December 2023, it was announced that Beltė would be competing in Eurovizija.LT, Lithuania's national selection to select the country's entry in the Eurovision Song Contest 2024, with the song "Luktelk". He went on to win the competition, earning the right to represent Lithuania at the contest. In the contest itself, held in Malmö, Sweden, he performed in the first semi-final, held on 7 May 2024, where he placed 4th out of 15 with 119 points, qualifying to the final, where he placed 14th out of 26 with 90 points.

On 29 March 2024, several entrants, including Silvester Belt, released a joint statement calling for "an immediate and lasting ceasefire" in Gaza, as well as "the safe return of all hostages".

== Artistry ==
Beltė describes his music as mainly pop, with some electronic, rave and techno influences. He cites Troye Sivan as his "all time inspiration."

== Personal life ==
Beltė is openly bisexual and came out publicly in 2017.

== Discography ==
=== Studio albums ===
Title	Details	Peak chart positions
Title	Details	LTU
Sprigtas	Released: 10 April 2026; Label: OpenPlay; Format: Digital download, streaming	11

=== Singles ===
==== As lead artist ====
Title	Year	Peak chart positions				Certification	Album or EP
Title	Year	LTU	LTU Air.	FIN	SWE	Certification	Album or EP
"Noise"	2017	*	—	—	—		Non-album singles
"Tave radau"	2017	*	—	—	—		Non-album singles
"Enough 4 U"	2020	—	—	—	—		Non-album singles
"Ar dar matai"	2022	48	—	—	—		Non-album singles
"Vidury naktų"	2023	—	—	—	—		Non-album singles
"Luktelk"	2024	1	1	44	83	AGATA: Gold	Non-album singles
"Tyliai tyliai"	2024	—	19	—	—		Non-album singles
"Naktį saulėje"	2025	—	—	—	—		Non-album singles
"Nebemyli"	2025	—	14	—	—		Sprigtas
"Apsirengus vasara (Remix)" (with Angelou)	2026	—	39	—	—		Non-album single
"—" denotes a recording that did not chart or was not released in that territory. "*" denotes that the chart did not exist at that time.

==== As featured artist ====
Title	Year	Album or EP
"My Drug" (Romen Jewels featuring Silvester Belt)	2018	Non-album single

=== Other charted songs ===
Title	Year	Peak chart positions		Album or EP
Title	Year	LTU	LTU Air.	Album or EP
"Miegantys kūnai"	2026	—	27	Sprigtas
"Atgal" (with Jessica Shy)	2026	13	—	Sprigtas
"—" denotes a recording that did not chart or was not released in that territory.

=== Other appearances ===
Title	Year	Peak chart positions	Album or EP
Title	Year	LTU	Album or EP
"Drugiai" (Jessica Shy featuring Silvester Belt)	2022	73	Apkabinti prisiminimus
"Jeigu neskaudėtų" (Jovani featuring Silvester Belt)	2025	—	Dažniai
"—" denotes a recording that did not chart or was not released in that territory.

== Awards and nominations ==
Year	Award	Category	Nominee(s)	Result	Ref.
2024	Eurovision Awards	#ALBM Cover of the Year	Himself (Note: For his performance of the song "Rush" by Troye Sivan.)	Won	
2024	Eurovision Awards	Best Luscious Locks	Himself	Won	
2025	M.A.M.A. Awards	Breakthrough of the Year	Himself	Won	
2025	M.A.M.A. Awards	M.A.M.A. Top 40	"Luktelk"	Won	
2025	M.A.M.A. Awards	Song of the Year	"Luktelk"	Nominated	

== Notes ==
Awards and achievements
Preceded by Monika Linkytė with "Stay"	Lithuania in the Eurovision Song Contest; 2024	Succeeded by Katarsis with "Tavo akys"
