= LRT Plius =

Lithuanian television station

LRT Plius (LRT+)
- Country: Lithuania

Ownership
- Owner: LRT
- Sister channels: LRT televizija LRT Lituanica

History
- Launched: 16 February 2003
- Former names: LTV2 (2003–2012); LRT Kultūra (2012–2018)

Links
- Webcast: Watch live
- Website: www.lrt.lt

Availability

Terrestrial
- Channel 4

LRT Plius is a Lithuanian television station owned and operated by LRT. LRT Plius was launched on 16 February 2003 as 'LTV2', then changed its name to LRT Kultūra on 28 July 2012. The station's name was changed on 1 October 2018 to LRT Plius.

== History ==
The channel was created in February 2003, at the start it was only shown in Vilnius and Kaunas. In Vilnius, the channel was carried on UHF channel 31; in its early months, most cable TV subscribers in Vilnius alone did not receive the channel, as the license was held by the Vilnius Television Technical Center. In 2005 the channel started to be broadcast in all Lithuanian territory. 2003-2007 broadcast všį „Kauno radijas ir televizija“ created TV shows about Kaunas city.

On 1 December 2009 analogue terrestrial broadcasting was discontinued.

Until 27 July 2012 the channel was called LTV2, also it was called "Lietuvos Televizijos: Antrasis Kanalas" (Lithuanian Television: Second Channel). On 27 July 2012, the channel was renamed as LRT Kultūra.

On 1 September 2017 HD broadcasts were started. On 1 October 2018 the channel was renamed as LRT Plius.

== Slogans ==
- 2003–2012: „Tavo kultūros kanalas“
- 2017–2018: „Čia Lietuva. Čia LRT Kultūra“
- 2018–2019: „Kultūra, kinas, sportas, dokumentika“

== Logos and identities ==
LTV2 logo (2003—2012)

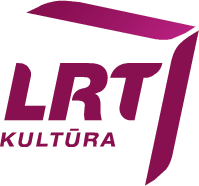
LRT Kultūra logo (2012—2018)

LRT Plius HD logo (2018–2022)
