= LRT Lituanica =

Lithuanian television channel

- Country: Lithuania
- Broadcast area: Worldwide

Programming
- Picture format: 16:9

Ownership
- Owner: LRT
- Sister channels: LRT televizija LRT Plius

History
- Launched: 23 September 2007; 18 years ago
- Former names: LTV World (2007–2012)

Links
- Website: www.lrt.lt/lituanica

Availability

Streaming media
- LRT mediateka: https://www.lrt.lt/mediateka/tiesiogiai/lrt-lituanica

LRT Lituanica is the third Lithuanian public television channel, operated by LRT. The channel broadcasts 24 hours per day and is a mix of original programming from LRT televizija and LRT Plius.

== Launch and reach ==
LRT Lituanica was launched as 'LTV World' at the end of September 2007. In Europe, it is available through Astra 4A satellite, also free of charge to Kabel Digital subscribers in Germany. Starting with August 2020, LRT Lituanica is also broadcast terrestrially in North-Eastern Poland as well. In North America, the channel could have viewed free of charge on satellite Galaxy 19, 97 West until 2020. It is also possible to watch live from the official LRT website and on the LRT YouTube channel. Since March 2023, the channel started working as HD, but only on the Internet.

== Logos ==
LTV World logo used until 2012

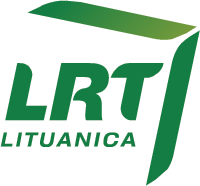
LRT Lituanica logo used until 2022
