= Sólo quiero más =

2026 song by Tomas Alenčikas

Single by Lion Ceccah
- Language: Lithuanian; English
- English title: "I Just Want More"
- Released: 2026
- Genre: Latin pop
- Songwriters: Tomas Alenčikas; Aurimas Galvelis

Music video
- "Sólo quiero más" on YouTube

Eurovision Song Contest 2026 entry
- Country: Lithuania
- Artist: Lion Ceccah
- Languages: Lithuanian, English
- Composers: Tomas Alenčikas; Aurimas Galvelis
- Lyricist: Tomas Alenčikas

Finals performance
- Semi-final result: 8th
- Semi-final points: 101
- Final result: 22nd
- Final points: 22

Entry chronology
- ◄ "Tavo akys" (2025)

Official performance video
- "Sólo quiero más" (first semi-final) on YouTube "Sólo quiero más" (grand final) on YouTube

"Sólo quiero más" (transl. "I Just Want More") is a song by Lithuanian pop singer Lion Ceccah (Tomas Alenčikas). The song represented Lithuania in the Eurovision Song Contest 2026 after winning the national selection.

== Writing ==
Alenčikas had previously participated in the Lithuanian national selection for Eurovision several times, sometimes under the name Alen Chicco. In 2026, he returned to the national selection and took part in the fourth round of Eurovizija.LT with the song "Sólo quiero más". He qualified for the final. The final took place on 27 February 2026. Although the jury only gave him second place, he received more than twice as many viewer votes as the second-placed band SHWR. Despite them having 22 points each, he won the national selection.

The song was composed and written by Alenčikas together with Aurimas Galvelis. Galvelis also produced the track and was one of the backing vocalists, along with Diana Anisko, Greta Paukštė, and Justinas Stanevičius. Mastering was performed by Normantas Ulevičius.

== Content ==
The song is a multilingual work. The first verse is sung in Lithuanian, and the chorus, containing the title line "Sólo quiero más," is sung in English and Spanish. The second verse is sung in Spanish, Lithuanian, and French, after which the chorus is repeated. At the end, the title line is translated into German, French, Italian, and Lithuanian. According to the artist, "Sólo quiero más" is "a visual and musical statement about desire, excess, and the constant thirst for more."

== Publication ==
The track was released on music streaming service on 6 February 2026. The music video was directed by Alēncikas himself and features clips from the short film "An Andalusian Dog." An instrumental version was released as a single on 8 March. The song "Sólo quiero más" was reworked and released on 16 April with a new music video.

== Eurovision 2026 ==
With "Sólo quiero más", Lithuania competed in the 70th Eurovision Song Contest, held in Vienna in May 2026. The song was entered as the 12th entry in the first semi-final on 12 May and qualified for the final. In the final, Lithuania finished 22nd with 22 points. This was Lithuania's sixth consecutive appearance in the final since 2021. For their performance at the contest, they created a costume-like sculpture made of metal and steel cables, which was held on stage by electromagnets and eventually folded in on itself. The sculpture was created by Sigita Šimkūnaitė and Sandra Straukaitė.
