= Luktelk =

2024 single by Silvester Belt

Single by Silvester Belt
- English title: "Wait"
- Released: 11 January 2024
- Genre: Pop; electronic
- Length: 2:41
- Label: OpenPlay
- Songwriters: Džesika Šyvokaitė; Elena Jurgaitytė; Silvestras Beltė
- Producers: Karolis Labanauskas; Linas Strockis

Silvester Belt singles chronology
"Vidury naktų" (2023)	"Luktelk" (2024)	"Tyliai tyliai" (2024)

Eurovision Song Contest 2024 entry
- Country: Lithuania
- Artist: Silvester Belt
- Language: Lithuanian
- Composers: Džesika Šyvokaitė; Elena Jurgaitytė; Silvestras Beltė
- Lyricists: Džesika Šyvokaitė; Elena Jurgaitytė; Silvestras Beltė

Finals performance
- Semi-final result: 4th
- Semi-final points: 119
- Final result: 14th
- Final points: 90

Entry chronology
- ◄ "Stay" (2023)
- "Tavo akys" (2025) ►

Official performance video
- "Luktelk" (First Semi-Final) on YouTube "Luktelk" (Grand Final) on YouTube

"Luktelk" (Lithuanian: [ˈlˠʊktʲɛlˠk]; lit. 'Wait') is a song by Lithuanian singer-songwriter Silvester Belt. It was released on 11 January 2024, through OpenPlay, and was written by Džesika Šyvokaitė, Elena Jurgaitytė, and Belt. The song represented Lithuania in the Eurovision Song Contest 2024, where it placed 14th with 90 points.

== Background and composition ==
"Luktelk" was composed and written by Silvestras Beltė, Džesika Šyvokaitė, and Elena Jurgaitytė. According to a press release given out by Lithuanian National Radio and Television (LRT), the songwriters composed the song specifically to enter the Eurovision Song Contest, with Belt stating that he wanted to show a "fun side of Lithuania – we are not always sad and closed... we want to show them at Eurovision". He also admitted that he wanted to make the song easily accessible to non-Lithuanians, adding "consonants [that] resemble other words in other languages".

In an analysis by Wiwibloggs' Ruxandra Tudor, the song is described to have "multiple layers of meaning"; particularly, it addresses the desire to party despite feelings of pain. To Belt, the song addressed the feeling of being "stuck in this kinda Matrix loop" and existentialism. Belt stated that due to monotonous daily tasks a human does, "we can’t tell anymore whether we are in a dream, or in another dimension". Despite this, he makes a call to "wake up tomorrow and... dance" despite feelings of not wanting to.

== Promotion ==
To promote "Luktelk" before Eurovision 2024, Belt announced his intent to participate in various Eurovision pre-parties throughout the months of March and April 2024, including Melfest WKND 2024 on 8 March, Pre-Party ES 2024 on 30 March, the Barcelona Eurovision Party 2024 on 6 April, the London Eurovision Party 2024 on 7 April, and Eurovision in Concert 2024 on 13 April. He also released an orchestral version of the song on 25 April to the official YouTube channel of the contest.

== Critical reception ==
The song met a favourable review with music critics. In a Wiwibloggs review containing several reviews from several critics, the song was rated 8.17 out of 10 points, earning fourth out of the 37 songs competing in the Eurovision Song Contest 2024 on the site's annual ranking. Another review conducted by ESC Bubble that contained reviews from a combination of readers and juries rated the song fourth out of the 15 songs "Luktelk" was competing against in its the Eurovision semi-final. Jon O'Brien, a writer for Vulture, ranked the song second overall, declaring it an "existential banger... [that] doubl[es] up as a theorem on the illusion of reality". ESC Beat's Doron Lahav ranked the song sixth overall, praising the song's hook and declaring, "this is the right way to create an electronic music song". Erin Adam, writer for The Scotsman, gave the song a heavily positive review, rating it nine out of 10 points.

== Eurovision Song Contest 2024 ==
=== Eurovizija.LT ===
Eurovizija.LT was the national final format organised by Lithuanian National Radio and Television (LRT) to select the Lithuanian representative for the Eurovision Song Contest 2024. For 2024, the competition saw 40 entries compete across five semi-finals, held between 13 January and 10 February 2024, and a final on 17 February 2024. A 50/50 combination of jury and public vote determined the ranking in each phase, with the top two entries from each semi-final qualifying for the final. The top three entries from the final then moved on to a final televoting round, selecting the winner.

Beltė was officially announced to compete in Euroviizja.LT on 19 December 2023. "Luktelk" was drawn to compete in the first semi-final, qualifying by finishing first out of the eight entries in the semi-final. In the final, the song moved on to the superfinal, along with two other entries, namely "Impossible" by Shower and "Simple Joy" by The Roop. The song eventually won the superfinal and the Lithuanian spot for the Eurovision Song Contest 2024.

=== At Eurovision ===
The Eurovision Song Contest 2024 took place at the Malmö Arena in Malmö, Sweden, and consisted of two semi-finals held on the respective dates of 7 and 9 May and the final on 11 May 2024. During the allocation draw on 30 January 2024, Lithuania was drawn to compete in the first semi-final, performing in the first half of the show. Belt was later drawn to perform in the third position in the semi-final, after Serbia's Teya Dora and before Ireland's Bambie Thug.

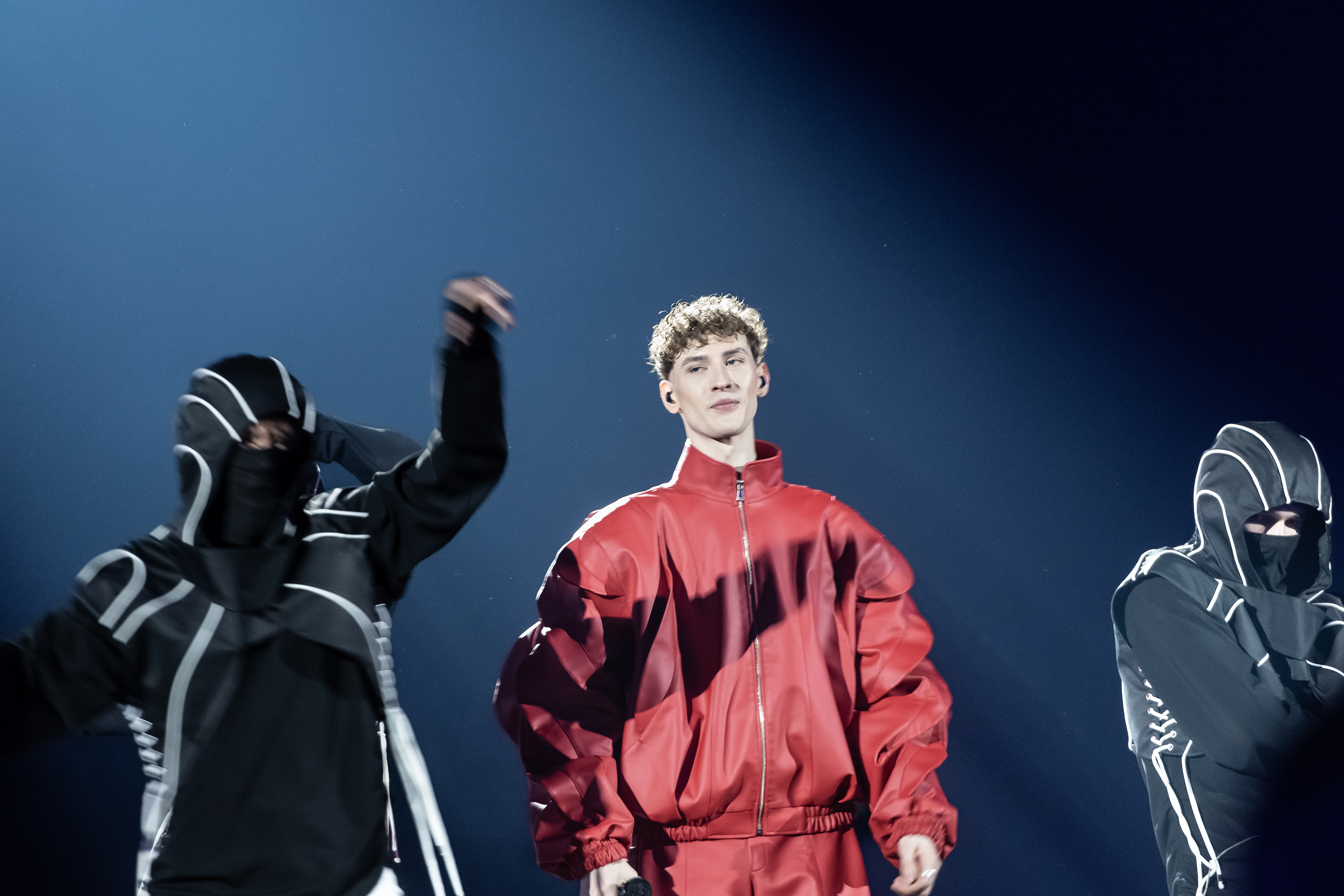
Belt performing "Luktelk" at a dress rehearsal before the Eurovision 2024 grand final.

For its Eurovision performance, Povilas Varvuolis was appointed as the creative director. Before the contest, LRT stated that they planned to make minimal changes from the Eurovizija.LT performance. The performance featured Belt wearing a red leather outfit, with four backing dancers wearing black masks also accompanying Belt. The red lighting from the national final performance remained the same, but blue lighting was also occasionally added. "Luktelk" finished fourth, scoring 119 points and securing a position in the grand final.

Belt performed a repeat of his performance in the grand final on 11 May. The song was performed seventh in the final, after Israel's Eden Golan and before Spain's Nebulossa. After the results were announced, Belt finished in 14th with 90 points, with a split score of 32 points from juries and 58 points from public televoting. No sets of the maximum 12 points were given by either group. The most a country gave regarding the former was seven by Portugal and Serbia, and the most regarding the latter was eight, given by Latvia and the United Kingdom. In response to performing after Golan and the country of Israel, whose performance was heavily booed, Belt wrote that his final performance was a "traumatic experience", wishing that "it all ended after the first semi". In later interviews, he stated that attending Eurovision felt like "a strange atmosphere... but we tried to distance ourselves from it".

== Awards and nominations ==
Year	Award	Category	Result	Ref.
2025	M.A.M.A. Awards	M.A.M.A. Top 40	Won	
2025	M.A.M.A. Awards	Song of the Year	Nominated	

== Track listing ==
Digital download/streaming

1. "Luktelk" – 2:41

Digital download/streaming – Remixes

1. "Luktelk - Sped Up" – 2:20
2. "Luktelk - Slowed Down" – 2:59

== Charts ==
=== Weekly charts ===
Weekly chart performance
Chart (2024)	Peak position
Finland (Suomen virallinen lista)	44
Greece International (IFPI)	32
Latvia Streaming (LaIPA)	10
Lithuania (AGATA)	1
Lithuania Airplay (TopHit)	1
Sweden (Sverigetopplistan)	83
UK Indie Breakers (OCC)	20

Weekly chart performance
Chart (2025)	Peak position
Lithuania Airplay (TopHit)	49

Weekly chart performance
Chart (2026)	Peak position
Lithuania Airplay (TopHit)	125

=== Monthly charts ===
2024 monthly chart performance for "Luktelk"
Chart (2024)	Peak position
Lithuania Airplay (TopHit)	2

2025 monthly chart performance for "Luktelk"
Chart (2025)	Peak position
Lithuania Airplay (TopHit)	88

=== Year-end charts ===
Year-end chart performance
Chart (2024)	Position
Lithuania Airplay (TopHit)	8

Year-end chart performance
Chart (2025)	Position
Lithuania Airplay (TopHit)	60

== Certifications ==
Certifications for "Luktelk" (streaming)
Region	Certification	Certified units/sales
Lithuania (AGATA)	Gold	2,500,000

== Release history ==
Release dates and formats for "Luktelk"
Region	Date	Format(s)	Version	Label	Ref.
Various	11 January 2024	Digital download; streaming	Original	OpenPlay	
Various	3 June 2024	Digital download; streaming	Remixes	OpenPlay	
