= Kabel Digital =

Kabel Digital is a German digital cable pay TV platform owned by Kabel Deutschland.

== Kabel Digital Home ==
- 13th Street
- AXN
- Kabel 1 Classics
- Kinowelt TV
- Sci Fi
- Silverline
- The History Channel
- National Geographic Channel
- Planet
- Spiegel TV Digital
- Wetterfernsehen
- BBC Prime
- E!
- Fashion TV
- G-TV
- Sat. 1 Comedy
- TV Gusto Premium
- Wein TV
- Boomerang
- Playhouse Disney
- Toon Disney
- Toon Disney +1
- ESPN Classic
- Extreme Sports Channel
- Motors TV
- NASN
- Sailing Channel
- Gute Laune TV
- MTV Dance
- MTV Hits
- Trace TV
- VH1 Classic
- Playboy TV
- Xtra Music

== Kabel Digital International ==
- AXN
- BBC Prime
- BBC World
- Boomerang
- CNBC Europe
- ESPN Classic
- Extreme Sports Channel
- MTV Dance
- MTV Hits
- NASN
- National Geographic Channel
- Sailing Channel
- Sky News
- TCM
- Toon Disney
- VH1 Classic
- ATV Avrupa
- Euro D
- Euro Star
- Kanal 7 Int.
- Lig TV
- Show Türk
- Sinematürk
- TGRT EU
- TRT Int.
- Channel One Russia
- Detsky Mir
- Euro News Rossiya
- Nashe Kino
- RTR Planeta
- RTV Int.
- Canal 24 Horas
- Euro News España
- TVE Int.
- ITVN
- TVP Polonia
- Euro News Portugal
- RTP Int.
- Euro News Italia
- Rai Uno
- Rai Due
- Rai Tre
- ERT Sat
