= LRT televizija =

Lithuanian television station

LRT Televizija
- Country: Lithuania
- Broadcast area: Lithuania, reaching bordering regions via overspill of the Lithuanian terrestrial network
- Headquarters: Vilnius, Lithuania

Programming
- Language: Lithuanian
- Picture format: 576i SDTV; 1080i HDTV

Ownership
- Owner: LRT
- Sister channels: LRT Plius; LRT Lituanica

History
- Launched: 30 April 1957; 69 years ago
- Former names: LTSR TV / TV Vilnius (1957–1990); LTV (1990–1998, 2002–2012); LRT (1998–2002, 2012–present)

Links
- Webcast: http://www.lrt.lt/mediateka/tiesiogiai/lrt-televizija/ (Limited programming outside Lithuania)
- Website: http://www.lrt.lt/

LRT Televizija (abbreviated LRT TV), formerly known as LTV, is the flagship television channel of Lithuanian National Radio and Television.

== History ==
LRT Televizija was launched on 30 April 1957 as LTSR TV or TV Vilnius, by 1960 it was broadcast six days a week. Colour transmissions in Vilnius began in 1968, began broadcasting in colour in 1975 using SECAM colour. The channel was rebranded on 27 July 2012 to LRT Televizija. Broadcasting in 16:9 format began on 25 March 2013. A HD version of the channel was launched on 20 January 2014. LRT televizija broadcasts an average of 18 hours per day (as of 2014, it is 24 hours per day) and is visible throughout Lithuania, via streaming and via the satellite Sirius 4 and Eastern Europe (one of the Viasat package of encrypted channels). LRT televizija can be watched free on the internet. However, due to copyright restrictions, Lithuania is the only country to watch LRT Televizija through an "ISP only" service.

== Programming ==
Programming consists of:

- Music – 29.8%
- Information/News – 15%
- Feature films and series – 14%
- Socio-public and Education – 11%
- TV Magazines and Journalistic Research – 9.4%
- Culture – 8%
- Programmes for Children – 7.4%
- Sport – 3.6%
- Programmes for ethnic minorities – 1%
- Entertainment – 0.7%
- Religious programmes – 0.4%

== Logos and identities ==
LTV logo (1990–1992)

LTV logo (2003–2012)

LRT televizija logo (2012–2022)

LRT televizija logo (2022–present)
