= Tavo akys =

2025 single by Katarsis

Single by Katarsis

from the album Žiedlapis tau
- Language: Lithuanian
- English title: "Your eyes"
- Released: 31 January 2025
- Genre: Alt-rock; post-punk; grunge
- Length: 2:52
- Songwriter: Lukas Radzevičius
- Producer: Lukas Radzevičius

Katarsis singles chronology
"Dingo" (2024)	"Tavo akys" (2025)	"Balta meilė" (2025)

Music video
- "Tavo akys" on YouTube

Eurovision Song Contest 2025 entry
- Country: Lithuania
- Artist: Katarsis
- Language: Lithuanian
- Composer: Lukas Radzevičius
- Lyricist: Lukas Radzevičius

Finals performance
- Semi-final result: 6th
- Semi-final points: 103
- Final result: 16th
- Final points: 96

Entry chronology
- ◄ "Luktelk" (2024)
- "Sólo quiero más" (2026) ►

"Tavo akys" (pronounced [ˈtɐʋoː ˈaːkʲiːs]; transl. "Your eyes") is a song by Lithuanian alternative rock band Katarsis. It was written by Lukas Radzevičius and produced by Jurgis Masilionis. The song was released on 31 January 2025 and represented Lithuania in the Eurovision Song Contest 2025.

== Eurovision Song Contest 2025 ==
=== Eurovizija.LT 2025 ===
Eurovizija.LT 2025 was the national final format organized by LRT to select its entry for the Eurovision Song Contest 2025. It was held between 11 January and 15 February 2025. The competition saw 45 entries compete across five semi-finals, held between 11 January and 8 February 2025, and a final on 15 February 2025. A 50/50 combination of jury and public vote determined the ranking in each phase, with the top two entries from each semi-final (out of the nine total) qualifying for the final; the top three entries from the final moving on to a final televoting round selecting the winner. In case of a tie in any of the previous stages, the jury ranking would take precedence. The score system was the same used at the Eurovision Song Contest: the top ten entries from each of the jury vote and the televote are assigned 1–8, 10 and 12 points. Performances for the semi-finals were pre-recorded, while they were delivered live in the final.

On 11 December 2024, Katarsis was announced as one of the forty-five contestants in the competition with the song "Tavo akys". On 1 February 2025, Tavo akys advanced to the semi-final stage, thus managing to advance to the final two weeks later. At the final of the event, Tavo akys was one of the three songs with the most votes received by the jury and at home, advancing to the superfinal, where the televote crowned it the winner and Lithuanian representative on the Eurovision stage in Basel.

=== At Eurovision ===
The Eurovision Song Contest 2025 took place at St. Jakobshalle in Basel, Switzerland, and consisted of two semi-finals held on the respective dates of 13 and 15 May and the final on 17 May 2025. During the allocation draw held on 28 January 2025, Lithuania was drawn to compete in the second semi-final, performing in the first half of the show, with 8th in the running order.

== Awards and nominations ==
Year	Award	Category	Result	Ref.
2025	M1 Music Awards	Hit of the Year	Nominated	
2026	M.A.M.A. Awards	M.A.M.A. Top 40	Won	
2026	M.A.M.A. Awards	Song of the Year	Nominated	

== Track listing ==
Digital download/streaming

1. "Tavo akys" – 2:52

Digital download/streaming – Choir version

1. "Tavo akys (Choir Version)" – 3:14

== Charts ==
Chart performance for "Tavo akys"
Chart (2025)	Peak position
Greece International (IFPI)	43
Latvia (LaIPA)	5
Lithuania (AGATA)	1
Lithuania (AGATA) Choir version	40
Lithuania Airplay (TopHit)	90

== Release history ==
Release dates and formats for "Tavo akys"
Region	Date	Format(s)	Version	Label	Ref.
Various	31 January 2025	Digital download; streaming	Original	Self-released	
Various	14 May 2025	Digital download; streaming	Choir	Self-released	
