= Lithuanian National Radio and Television =

Public broadcasting company of Lithuania

- Logo since 2022
- Native name: Lietuvos nacionalinis radijas ir televizija
- Type: State funded public service broadcaster
- Industry: Mass media
- Founded: 12 June 1926; 100 years ago (radio); 30 April 1957; 69 years ago (television)
- Headquarters: S. Konarskio g. 49, Vilnius, Lithuania
- Area served: Lithuania
- Key people: Monika Garbačiauskaitė-Budrienė (CEO)
- Production output: LRT Studios
- Services: Television, radio, online
- Owner: Government of Lithuania
- Divisions: LR, LRT TV
- Website: www.lrt.lt

Lithuanian National Radio and Television (Lithuanian: Lietuvos nacionalinis radijas ir televizija) is a Lithuanian public service broadcaster that has been providing regular radio services since 1926 and television broadcasts since 1957. LRT joined the European Broadcasting Union in 1993. It operates three national television channels, radio stations and an internet website.

LRT is one of the largest media groups in Lithuania and is publicly owned. Its main purpose is to serve the public interest and the public's right to trustworthy and objective information. LRT is certified in accordance with the Journalism Trust Initiative. LRT's radio and television services operate from its headquarters in Vilnius. LRT radijas, the main LRT radio station, has the biggest share in the Lithuanian radio market and pays most of attention to the operative news and educative on-air production.

In 2026, LRT celebrates its centennial under the slogan "100 Years of You", commemorating the first radio broadcast in Lithuania, which took place on 12 June, 1926. The Lithuanian Parliament has declared 2026 the Year of Lithuanian Radio. UNESCO has added the centennial of Lithuania's radio to its list of commemorative dates.

== History ==
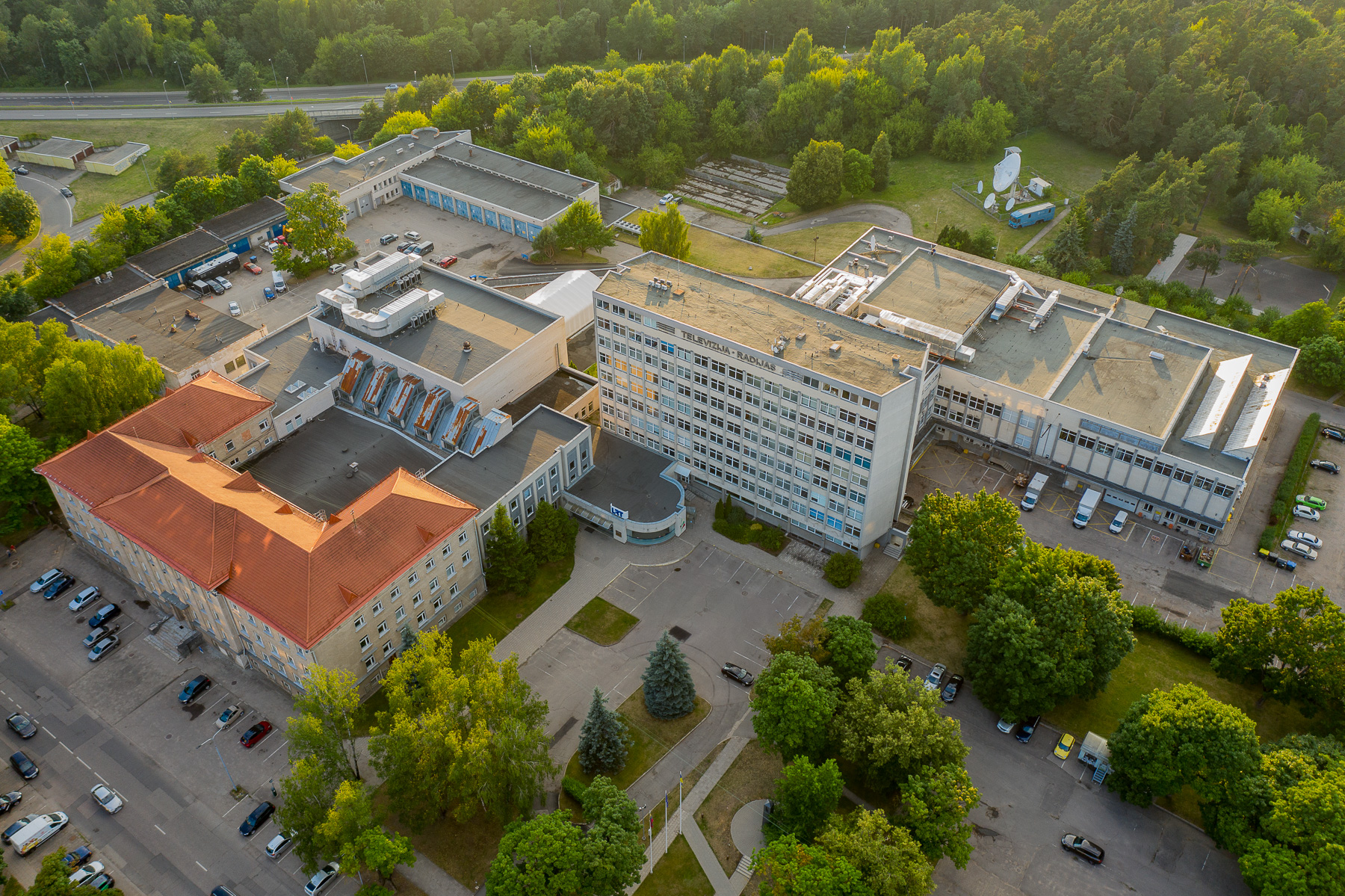
LRT headquarters in Vilnius

The Lithuanian Radio started regular broadcasting on 12 June 1926. The television service has been broadcasting since 30 April 1957. In 1965, radio broadcasts were started in English. In 1975, the first coloured programme from LRT was broadcast. Radio and television services are now operating from LRT headquarters in Vilnius, the capital of Lithuania. As of 2025, LRT employs approximately 670 people. In May 2007, LRT started a project of converting all of its films, including some five thousand hours of cinefilm and some 30,000 hours of videotapes to digital. The oldest entry dates back to 1895.

LRT comprises seven media channels broadcasting nationwide. The content of all the channels is integrated and shared across all three platforms: television, radio, and on-line (web-portal and LRT's accounts on social media networks). LRT produces around two-thirds of its content in-house, while one third is commissioned from external producers.

In delivering international news coverage, LRT cooperates with private and public media, including BBC, Deutsche Welle, Voice of America, Radio Free Europe/Radio Liberty, and others. LRT was admitted as a fully active member of the European Broadcasting Union on 1 January 1993. From the restoration of independence in 1991 to 31 December 1992, LRT was a member of the International Radio and Television Organisation.

== Governance ==
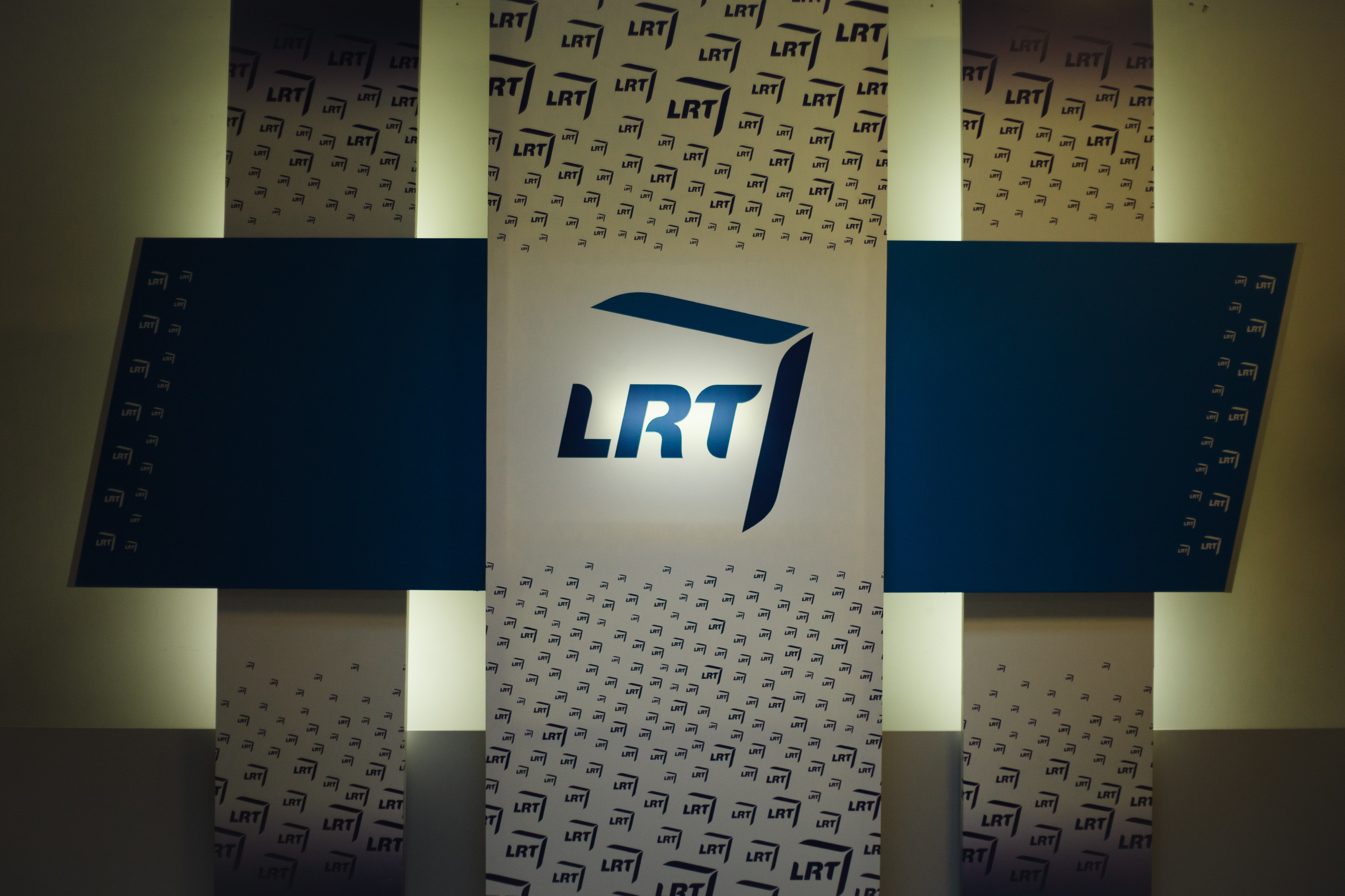
LRT entry hall

The LRT Council is the highest governing body of LRT. The Council supervises the implementation of the LRT mission, approves the annual income and spending by LRT administration. The Council comprises twelve members prominent in social, scientific and cultural fields, appointed for six-year terms.

Currently, the LRT Council is chaired by Mindaugas Jurkynas with Rėda Brandišauskienė acting as Vice-Chair.

== Budget ==
LRT budget comprises appropriations from the state budget, revenue from the sale of programmes, sponsorship announcements and publishing, as well as sponsorship and revenue from commercial and economic activities.

In 2025, following amendments to the Law on Radio and Television of Lithuania, a new version of the law came into effect, introducing a new funding formula for LRT.

The state budget appropriations to be allocated to the LRT for 2026–2028 shall be equal to the state budget appropriations allocated to the LRT for 2025 (€79.6 million). Beginning in 2029 and in each subsequent year, the annual allocation of state budget funds to the LRT shall comprise 0.75% of personal income tax revenues and 0.8% of excise duty revenues actually collected by the state and municipal budgets in the year before last.

== Facilities and equipment ==
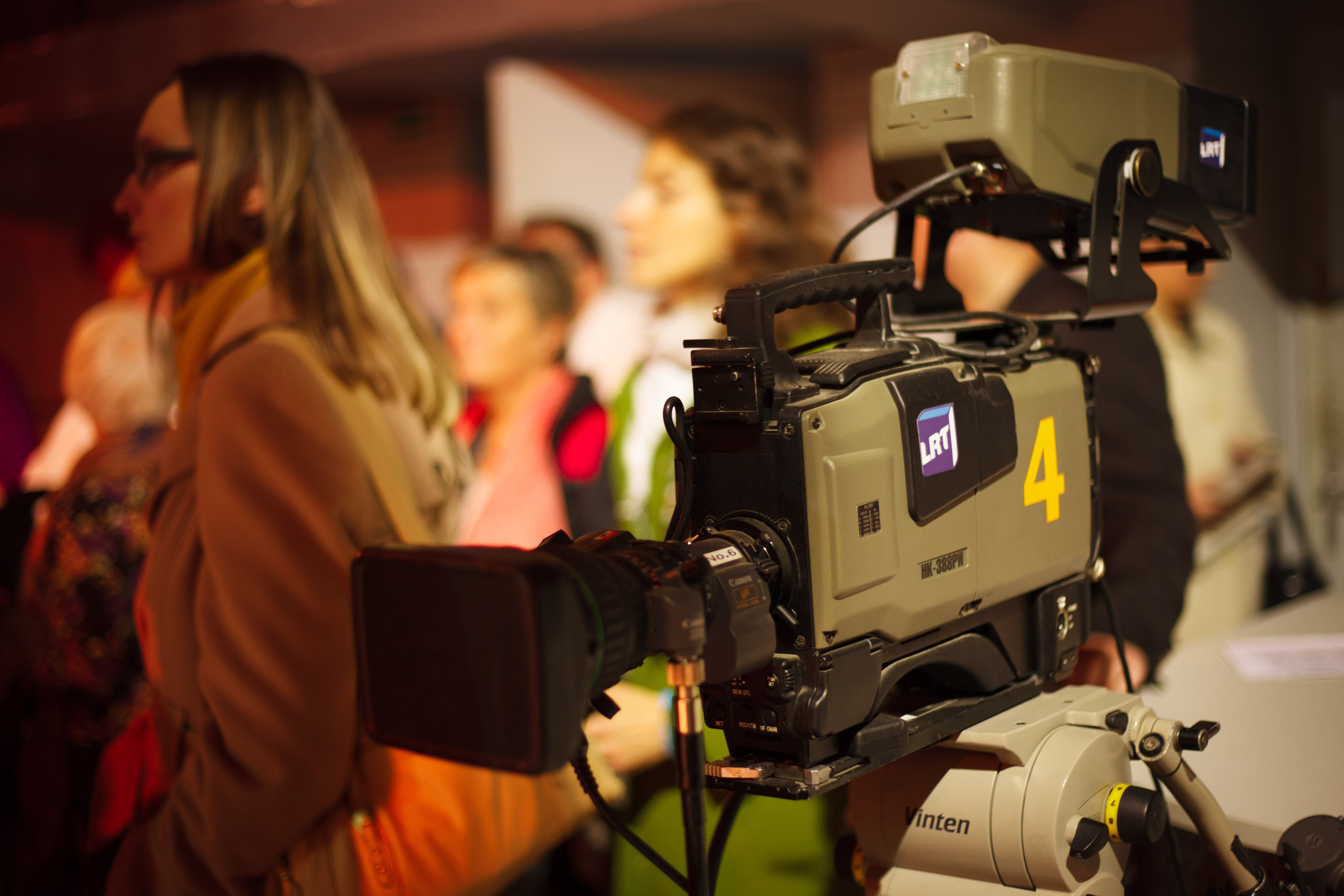
Camera in an LRT studio

LRT has TV studios of 70 sq.m, 120 sq.m, two studios of 300 sq.m and one studio of 700 sq.m. LRT also uses OB stations for broadcasting. Studio facilities include modern computer graphics equipment.

== Platforms and channels ==
LRT TV and live radio, along with LRT Epika, provide content accessible worldwide (via LRT.lt and epika.lrt.lt respectively), except for some titles restricted by rights to Lithuania.

=== Radio ===
Logo of LRT 100, Lithuanian online-only radio channel launched to commemorate World Radio Day and LRT's 100th anniversary

- LRT Radijas – main general-purpose radio program
- LRT Klasika – cultural content and classical music as well as specialised content for Lithuanian ethnic minority groups
- LRT Opus – contemporary music and content for younger audiences
- LRT 100 – online radio channel playing music in the Lithuanian language

=== Television ===
- LRT Televizija (HD) – broadcasts generalist programming in HD aimed at a wide audience,
- LRT Plius (HD) – focuses on culture and sports,
- LRT Lituanica – broadcasts exclusively Lithuanian content of two other LRT TV channels around the clock via the satellite and internet webpage and is also streamed live on YouTube.

=== Online ===
- LRT.lt – in addition to the main news page in Lithuanian, it also has news sections in English, Polish, and Russian. All content which has been published or aired on LRT channels is permanently stored and freely accessible at LRT's digital archive Mediateka, unless copyright restrictions apply.
- LRT Epika – a free video-on-demand platform and offers a wide range of specially selected films and series, from recently awarded international festival films to the treasure trove of Lithuanian cinema. It was launched on 11 May 2023.
- LRT Vaikai– a children's online platform and YouTube channel aimed at those aged 1 to 5.
- LRTU – YouTube channel for teenagers.

== Logo ==
LRT's logo from 1998 to 2003

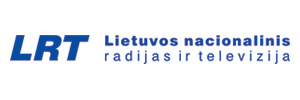
LRT's logo from 2003 to 2012

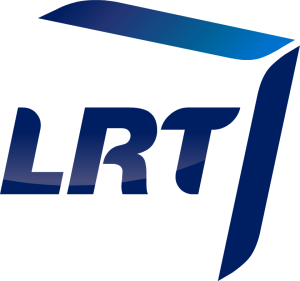
LRT's previous logo, used from 2012 to 2022

LRT's current logo used since 2022

== See also ==
- 1991 January Events
