= Czech Republic in the Eurovision Song Contest 2024 =

- Eurovision Song Contest 2024
- Participating broadcaster: Czech Television (ČT)
- Country: Czech Republic
- Selection process: ESCZ 2024
- Selection date: 13 December 2023

Competing entry
- Song: "Pedestal"
- Artist: Aiko
- Songwriters: Alena Shirmanova-Kostebelova; Steven Ansell

Placement
- Semi-final result: Failed to qualify (11th)

Participation chronology

The Czech Republic, presented as Czechia, was represented at the Eurovision Song Contest 2024 with the song "Pedestal", written by Alena Shirmanova-Kostebelova and Steven Ansell, and performed by Shirmanova-Kostebelova herself under her stage name Aiko. The Czech participating broadcaster, Czech Television (ČT), organised the national final ESCZ 2024 in order to select its entry for the contest.

Czechia was drawn to compete in the second semi-final of the Eurovision Song Contest which took place on 9 May 2024. Performing during the show in position 5, "Pedestal" was not announced among the top 10 entries of the second semi-final and therefore did not qualify to compete in the final. It was later revealed that Czechia placed eleventh out of the 16 participating countries in the semi-final with 38 points.

== Background ==
Prior to the 2024 contest, Czech Television (ČT) had participated in the Eurovision Song Contest representing the Czech Republic eleven times since its first entry in 2007. It competed in the contest on three consecutive occasions between 2007 and 2009 without qualifying to the final. After "Aven Romale" performed by Gipsy.cz placed 18th (last) in their semi-final in 2009, failing to score any points, ČT withdrew from the contest between 2010 and 2014, citing low viewing figures and poor results as reasons for its absence. Since returning to the contest in 2015 and qualifying to the final for the first time in 2016, it had featured in five finals. In 2023, it qualified for the final with the song "My Sister's Crown" performed by Vesna, ultimately placing 10th with 129 points.

As part of its duties as participating broadcaster, ČT organises the selection of its entry in the Eurovision Song Contest and broadcasts the event in the country. The broadcaster had used both national finals and internal selections to select its entries in the past. Between 2018 and 2020, and again since 2022, it had used the national final format ESCZ (formerly titled Eurovision Song CZ) as its selection method for the contest. On 16 October 2023, ČT confirmed its intention to participate in the 2024 contest, with its entry to be selected again via ESCZ.

== Before Eurovision ==
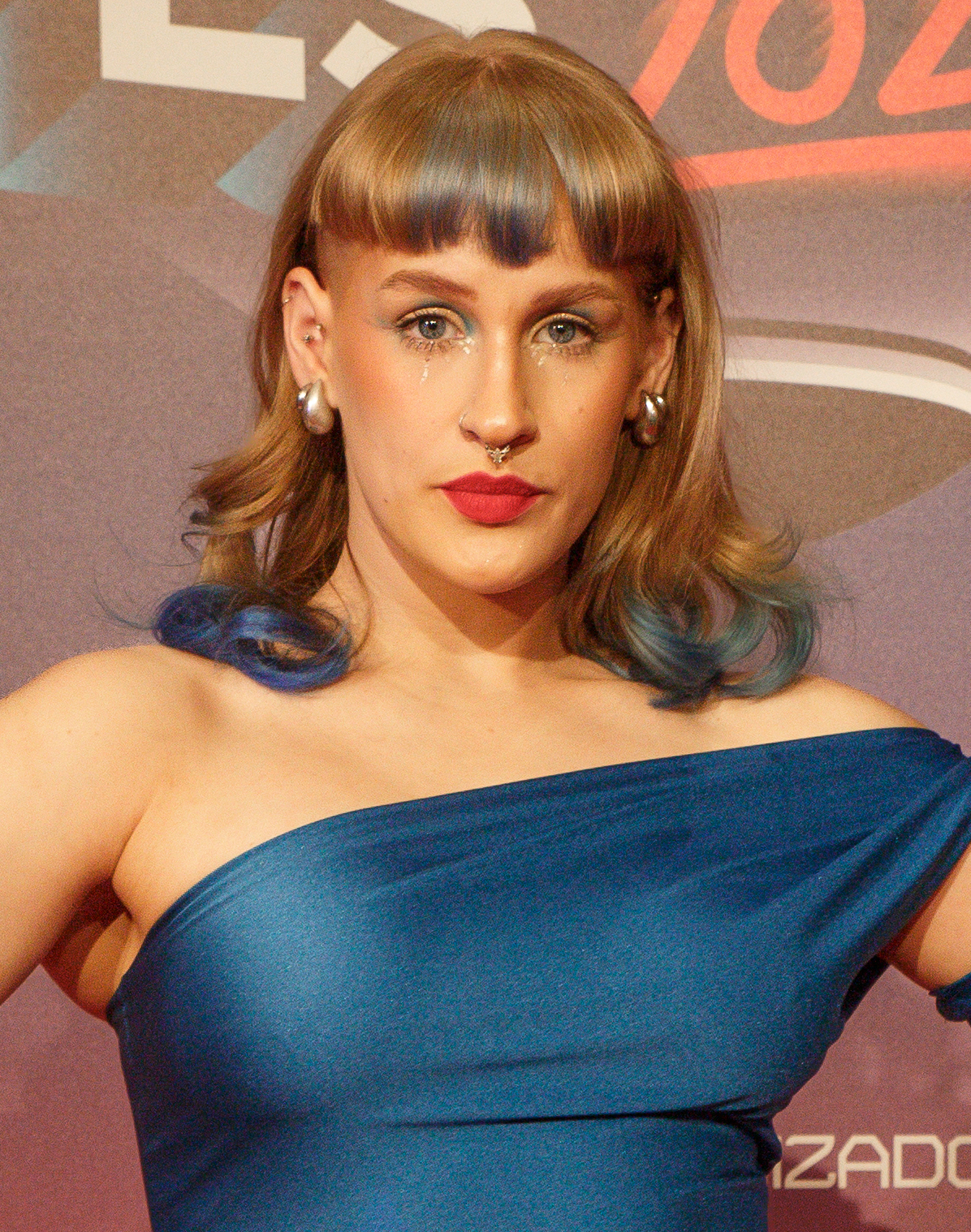
Aiko, winner of ESCZ 2024, at the PrePartyES event in Madrid

=== ESCZ 2024 ===
ESCZ 2024 was the sixth edition of ESCZ, the national final organised by ČT in order to select its entry for the Eurovision Song Contest. The competition consisted of a live final held in Prague on 4 December 2023 followed by a voting round lasting until 11 December 2023.

==== Competing entries ====
Upon confirming its participation in the contest on 16 October 2023, ČT opened a submission window for interested artists and composers lasting until 7 November 2023. At least one of the performers was required to have either Czech or Slovak citizenship for an entry to qualify to compete, while songwriters could be of any nationality.

On 14 November 2023, ČT announced that five finalist entries were being selected by music advisor Cesár Sampson (2018 representative for Austria) and the Czech delegation for the contest from over 200 submissions received, with the names of the artists to be revealed shortly; it was later clarified that the number of selected finalists may rise up to seven. The seven finalists were revealed on 28 November 2023; some of their songs, originally to be unveiled on the day of the final, were released earlier.

Artist	Song	Songwriter(s)
Aiko	"Pedestal"	Alena Shirmanova-Kostebelova; Steven Ansell
Elly	"The Angel's Share"	Argyle Singh; Eliška Tunková; Jan Vávra; Rony Janeček
Gianna Lei	"Starlet"	Gianna Leilani Rivolová; Morten Bergholt
Lenny	"Good Enough"	Lenka Filipová; Marcus Tran; Otakar Petřina
Mydy	"Red Flag Parade"	Jakub Svoboda; Maria Broberg; Mikuláš Pejcha; Ondřej Slánský; Paweł "Leon" Krześniak; Žofie Dařbujánová
Tom Sean	"Dopamine Overdose"	Edwin Lindberg; Jan Vávra; Lukas Hällgren; Tomas Sean Pšenička
Tomas Robin	"Out of My Mind"	Martin Zaujec; Tomáš Červinka; Tomáš Lobb

==== Final ====
The seven competing entries were performed during a live show at the Roxy in Prague on 4 December 2023, hosted for the second time in a row by Adam Mišík and co-hosted by Cesár Sampson. The show was broadcast on ČT art as well as via ČT's streaming platform iVysílání and the official Eurovision Song Contest's YouTube channel, and featured Lake Malawi and We Are Domi (2019 and 2022 Czech representatives at Eurovision) as guest performers. The winner was determined by a weighted combination of an international and a Czech public vote held via the official Eurovision Song Contest application until 11 December 2023. The winner, Aiko with "Pedestal", was announced on 13 December; it was also revealed that nearly 98 thousand votes had been cast. The full results were published shortly after on Instagram.

R/O	Artist	Song	Czech vote		International vote		Total	Place
R/O	Artist	Song	Votes	Weighted	Votes	Weighted	Total	Place
1	Aiko	"Pedestal"	2,410	723	33,107	23,175	23,898	1
2	Elly	"The Angel's Share"	24,679	7,404	7,817	5,472	12,876	2
3	Gianna Lei	"Starlet"	372	112	773	541	653	7
4	Lenny	"Good Enough"	4,216	1,265	1,586	1,110	2,375	5
5	Mydy	"Red Flag Parade"	6,443	1,933	7,283	5,098	7,031	3
6	Tom Sean	"Dopamine Overdose"	3,331	999	3,573	2,501	3,500	4
7	Tomas Robin	"Out of My Mind"	728	218	1,563	1,094	1,313	6

=== Preparation and promotion ===
In late January 2024, ČT's Ahmad Halloun shared a tweet mentioning a "new version" of "Pedestal", suggesting the song was undergoing a revamp ahead of the contest; this was confirmed by Aiko in early March, revealing that the new version would be released on 21 March. The revamped version features a lyrical change to comply with the contest's regulations prohibiting vulgar language. As part of the promotion of her participation in the contest, Aiko attended the PrePartyES in Madrid on 30 March 2024, the Barcelona Eurovision Party on 6 April 2024, the London Eurovision Party on 7 April 2024, the Eurovision in Concert event in Amsterdam on 13 April 2024, the Nordic Eurovision Party in Stockholm on 14 April 2024 and the Copenhagen Eurovision Party (Malmöhagen) on 4 May 2024.

== At Eurovision ==
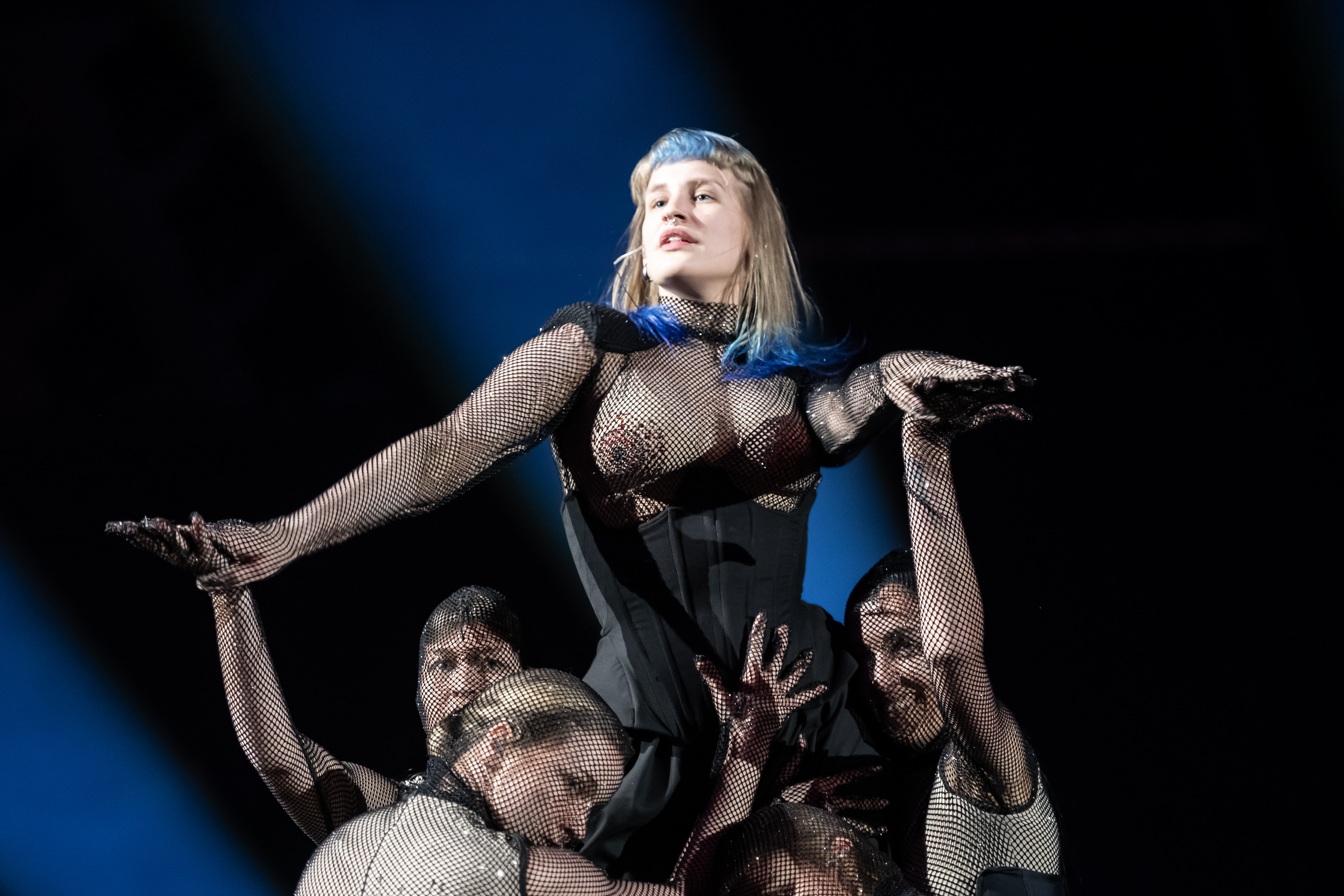
Aiko during a rehearsal before the second semi-final.

The Eurovision Song Contest 2024 took place at the Malmö Arena in Malmö, Sweden, and consisted of two semi-finals held on the respective dates of 7 and 9 May and the final on 11 May 2024. All nations with the exceptions of the host country and the "Big Five" (France, Germany, Italy, Spain and the United Kingdom) were required to qualify from one of two semi-finals in order to compete in the final; the top ten countries from each semi-final progressd to the final. On 30 January 2024, an allocation draw was held to determine which of the two semi-finals, as well as which half of the show, each country would perform in; the European Broadcasting Union (EBU) split up the competing countries into different pots based on voting patterns from previous contests, with countries with favourable voting histories put into the same pot. Czechia was scheduled for the first half of the second semi-final. The shows' producers then decided the running order for the semi-finals; Czechia was set to perform in position 5.

In Czechia, all the shows were aired on ČT2, with commentary provided by Vašek Matějovský, Patricie Kaňok Fuxová and Dominika Hašková. In addition, as part of the Eurovision programming, ČT cooperated with DR and SVT alongside other EBU member broadcasters – namely ARD/WDR, the BBC, ERR, France Télévisions, NRK, NTR, RÚV, VRT and Yle – to produce and air a documentary titled ABBA – Against the Odds, on the occasion of the 50th anniversary of Sweden's first victory at the contest with "Waterloo" by ABBA.

=== Performance ===
Aiko took part in technical rehearsals on 29 April and 2 May, followed by dress rehearsals on 8 and 9 May. The staging of her performance of "Pedestal" at the contest was directed by Matyas Vorda (LED screen content and light design) and Vit Belohradsky (camera and stage, a position previously held for the Czech performances in 2022 and 2023), while her costume, black with sparkles and mesh, was designed by Lukáš Macháček. She was accompanied on stage by four Slovak female dancers, explained as representing the first four stages of grief during a breakup, i.e. denial, anger, bargaining and depression, with the singer representing the final stage, acceptance. Slovak choreographer Miňo Kereš decided the dance routine for the performance.

=== Semi-final ===
Czechia performed in position 5, following the entry from Switzerland and before entry from Austria. The country was not announced among the top 10 entries in the semi-final and therefore failed to qualify to compete in the final. It was later revealed that Czechia placed eleventh out of the sixteen participating countries in the second semi-final with 38 points, 5 points away from qualification.

=== Voting ===
Below is a breakdown of points awarded to and by Czechia in the second semi-final and in the final. Voting during the three shows involved each country awarding sets of points from 1-8, 10 and 12: one from their professional jury and the other from televoting in the final vote, while the semi-final vote was based entirely on the vote of the public. The Czech jury consisted of Ondřej Bambas, Bára Juránková, Kristyna Koreis, Marek Slabý, and Jaroslav Špulák. In the second semi-final, Czechia placed 11th with 38 points. Over the course of the contest, Czechia awarded its 12 points to Israel in the second semi-final, and to Ukraine in both the jury and televote in the final.

ČT appointed Radka Rosická as its spokesperson to announce the Czech jury's votes in the final.

==== Points awarded to Czechia ====
Points awarded to Czechia (Semi-final 2)
Score	Televote
12 points	
10 points	
8 points	
7 points	
6 points	San Marino (Note: San Marino uses a jury in the semi-finals.)
5 points	Austria; Israel
4 points	Georgia
3 points	Latvia; Norway
2 points	Estonia; Italy; Malta; Spain
1 point	Armenia; Denmark; Netherlands; Rest of the World

==== Points awarded by Czechia ====
Points awarded by Czechia (Semi-final 2)
Score	Televote
12 points	Israel
10 points	Netherlands
8 points	Switzerland
7 points	Armenia
6 points	Estonia
5 points	Latvia
4 points	Greece
3 points	Norway
2 points	Austria
1 point	Georgia

Points awarded by Czechia (Final)
Score	Televote	Jury
12 points	Ukraine	Ukraine
10 points	Israel	Switzerland
8 points	Croatia	Sweden
7 points	Switzerland	Ireland
6 points	Ireland	Armenia
5 points	Armenia	Germany
4 points	France	France
3 points	Sweden	Portugal
2 points	Greece	Croatia
1 point	Lithuania	Norway

==== Detailed voting results ====
Each participating broadcaster assembles a five-member jury panel consisting of music industry professionals who are citizens of the country they represent. Each jury, and individual jury member, is required to meet a strict set of criteria regarding professional background, as well as diversity in gender and age. No member of a national jury was permitted to be related in any way to any of the competing acts in such a way that they cannot vote impartially and independently. The individual rankings of each jury member as well as the nation's televoting results were released shortly after the grand final.

The following members comprised the Czech jury:

- Ondřej Bambas
- Bára Juránková
- Kristyna Koreis
- Marek Slabý
- Jaroslav Špulák

Detailed voting results from Czechia (Semi-final 2)
R/O	Country	Televote	
R/O	Country	Rank	Points
01	Malta	13	
02	Albania	15	
03	Greece	7	4
04	Switzerland	3	8
05	Czechia		
06	Austria	9	2
07	Denmark	12	
08	Armenia	4	7
09	Latvia	6	5
10	San Marino	14	
11	Georgia	10	1
05	Belgium	11	
13	Estonia	5	6
14	Israel	1	12
15	Norway	8	3
16	Netherlands	2	10

Detailed voting results from Czechia (Final)
R/O	Country	Jury							Televote	
R/O	Country	Juror A	Juror B	Juror C	Juror D	Juror E	Rank	Points	Rank	Points
01	Sweden	1	3	4	4	6	3	8	8	3
02	Ukraine	4	1	1	3	2	1	12	1	12
03	Germany	6	6	7	17	4	6	5	17	
04	Luxembourg	25	12	22	20	23	22		12	
~~05~~	~~Netherlands~~ ‡ (Note: The Netherlands was disqualified prior to the final.)	~~19~~	~~25~~	~~10~~	~~14~~	~~25~~	~~19~~		N/A	
06	Israel	16	14	13	18	11	16		2	10
07	Lithuania	26	16	12	10	14	15		10	1
08	Spain	20	24	24	21	12	21		21	
09	Estonia	14	7	16	12	8	12		14	
10	Ireland	2	2	11	2	7	4	7	5	6
11	Latvia	12	15	17	13	9	14		15	
12	Greece	13	13	6	6	18	11		9	2
13	United Kingdom	11	19	15	16	22	18		19	
14	Norway	9	10	5	11	13	10	1	20	
15	Italy	22	11	18	5	21	13		11	
16	Serbia	18	18	19	22	16	23		16	
17	Finland	21	20	20	19	24	25		13	
18	Portugal	10	4	8	8	20	8	3	25	
19	Armenia	5	5	3	7	15	5	6	6	5
20	Cyprus	8	23	21	24	19	17		23	
21	Switzerland	3	9	2	1	3	2	10	4	7
22	Slovenia	17	22	25	26	17	24		22	
23	Croatia	15	17	14	15	1	9	2	3	8
24	Georgia	23	21	23	23	10	20		24	
25	France	7	8	9	9	5	7	4	7	4
26	Austria	24	26	26	25	26	26		18	
