= Pedestal (Aiko song) =

2023 song by Aiko

- Eurovision version cover

Single by Aiko

from the album Fortune's Child and Aikonic
- Released: 22 September 2023; 21 March 2024 (Eurovision version)
- Recorded: January 2023
- Genre: Pop rock; pop-punk
- Length: 2:28; 2:58 (Eurovision version)
- Label: Self-released
- Songwriters: Steven Ansell; Aiko
- Producer: Steven Ansell

Aiko singles chronology
"Lucky Streak" (2023)	"Pedestal" (2023)	"The Internet" (2023)

Music video
- "Pedestal" on YouTube

Eurovision Song Contest 2024 entry
- Country: Czech Republic
- Artist: Aiko
- Composer: Steven Ansell
- Lyricist: Aiko

Finals performance
- Semi-final result: 11th
- Semi-final points: 38

Entry chronology
- ◄ "My Sister's Crown" (2023)
- "Kiss Kiss Goodbye" (2025) ►

Official performance video
- "Pedestal" (second semi-final) on YouTube

"Pedestal" is a song by Czech singer Aiko, self-released on 22 September 2023 as the lead single of Aiko's third studio album, Fortune's Child. Self-described as a "self-love, post-breakup anthem", it was written by Aiko and Steven Ansell. The song represented the Czech Republic in the Eurovision Song Contest 2024, held in Malmö. It finished in 11th place with 38 points during semi final 2. The Eurovision version of the song appears on Aiko's fourth studio album, Aikonic.

== Background and composition ==
"Pedestal" is composed by Aiko and Steven Ansell. In interviews, Aiko has self-described the song as a "self-love, post-breakup anthem" meant to release her anger after breaking up in a relationship with an unnamed partner. After breaking up with her partner, she had a "moment of realization" where she realized that she had not taken care of herself first. The song advocates for putting one's own self and their health as their top priority, using a "pedestal" as a metaphor for the message. The song was recorded throughout January 2023. In press statements, she has also claimed that the song also "talks about negative emotions and situations" one experiences at the end of a toxic relationship.

According to Aiko, she submitted three entries for ESCZ 2024, including another song from her album Fortune's Child; the album from which "Pedestal" came from. She was officially announced to participate in ESCZ 2024 on 28 November 2023. After winning the contest, a member of the Czech delegation, Ahmad Halloun, implied the song would be revamped specifically for its performance at the Eurovision Song Contest; this was confirmed by Aiko in early March, revealing that the new version would be released on 21 March. The revamped version features a lyrical change to comply with the contest's regulations prohibiting vulgar language.

== Music video and promotion ==
Before the album's official release, an accompanying music video for "Pedestal" was released on 22 September 2023; a music video of the revamped Eurovision version was later released on 21 March 2024. To further promote the song, Aiko performed the song at various Eurovision pre-parties throughout the month of April, including the Eurovision in Concert event on 13 April 2024 and the Nordic Eurovision Party 2024 on 14 April.

== Critical reception ==
In a Wiwibloggs review containing several statements from several critics, the song was rated 7 out of 10 points, earning 14th out of 37 songs on the site's annual ranking. Jon O'Brien of Vulture ranked the song as 11th out of 37, describing it as "one of this year's most potent songs, a spiky post-break-up anthem/ode to self-care that could be mistaken for Paramore in their orange-haired, Twilight-bothering days".

== Eurovision Song Contest ==
=== ESCZ 2024 ===
Czech Republic's broadcaster Česká televize (ČT) organized a seven-entry competition, ESCZ 2024 with a singular grand final to select its entrant for the Eurovision Song Contest 2024. The edition was the sixth iteration of the national final. The winning song in the final was selected after all entries were shown in the grand final on 4 December, with voting opened until 11 December, with the winner being determined by a weighted combination of an international and a Czech public vote.

Aiko was announced to compete in ESCZ 2024 on 28 November 2023, with her song for the contest being revealed during the grand final. After voting was closed, on 13 December, the song was announced as the winner of the contest. Despite having a lack of votes of the Czech vote, the song earned an extreme majority of the international vote, earning more than 10,000 votes than the second-place finisher. As a result, the song won the right to represent the Czech Republic in the Eurovision Song Contest 2024.

=== At Eurovision ===
The Eurovision Song Contest 2024 took place at the Malmö Arena in Malmö, Sweden, and consisted of two semi-finals held on the respective dates of 7 and 9 May and the final on 11 May 2024. During the allocation draw on 30 January 2024, Czechia was drawn to compete in the second semi-final, performing in the first half of the show. Aiko was later drawn to perform fifth in the semi-final, ahead of Switzerland's Nemo and before Austria's Kaleen.

For her Eurovision performance, Matyas Vorda and Vit Belohradsky were appointed as staging directors. It featured Aiko in a Lukáš Macháček-designed dress made out of black mesh adorned with sparkles. She was also surrounded by four dancers which represented the first four stages of the five stages of grief, with Aiko herself representing the final stage.

== Charts ==
Chart performance for "Pedestal"
Chart (2024)	Peak position
Lithuania (AGATA)	49

== Release history ==
Release history and formats for "Pedestal"
Country	Date	Format(s)	Version	Label	Ref.
Various	22 September 2023	Digital download; streaming	Single	Self-released	
Various	21 March 2024	Digital download; streaming	Eurovision version	Self-released	
Various	17 May 2024	Digital download; streaming	Stripped	Self-released	
