= Lenny (singer) =

Czech musician (born 1993)

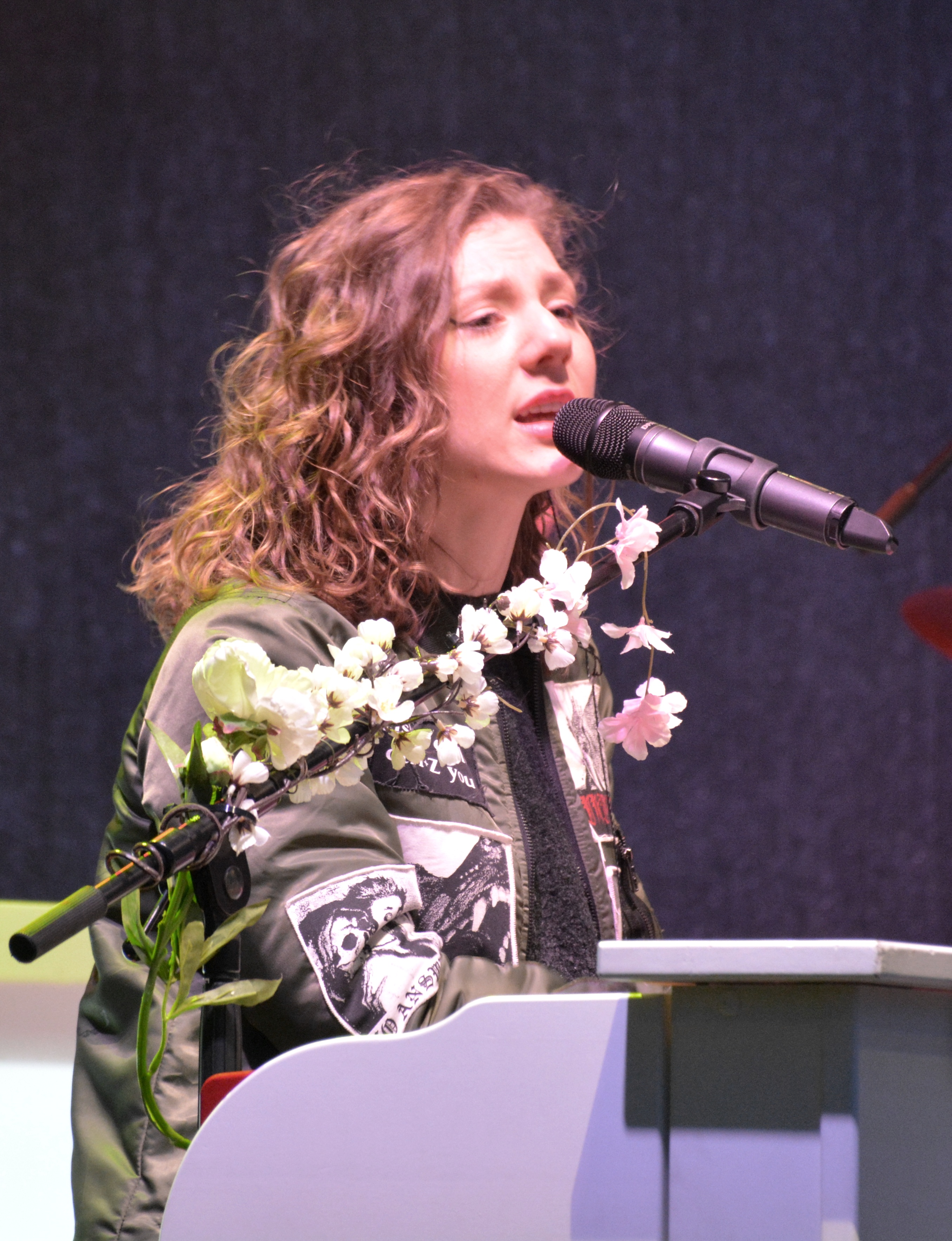
- Lenny in 2017

Background information
- Born: Lenka Filipová; 25 September 1993 (age 32); Prague, Czech Republic
- Genres: Pop; rock
- Occupation: Musician
- Years active: 2013–present
- Label: Universal
- Website: lennymusic.net

Lenka Filipová (born 25 September 1993), known professionally as Lenny, is a Czech singer, songwriter, composer, lyricist, and pianist.

== Early life ==
Lenka Filipová was born on 25 September 1993 in Prague into an artistic family of folk singer and guitar player Lenka Filipová and architect Boris Drbal. Her grandfather was theatre and TV actor Adolf Filip.

She started playing the piano at the age of four and studied it at the art school from six to ten. At the same time she attended a language school where she learned fluent English. She was also a member of a school drama club and sang in choirs. Later she started singing solo accompanied by piano. She composed melodies and later added lyrics. She wrote her first song at the age of eleven. At sixteen she started playing with a band and accompanied her mother on their tour in Europe, Australia, America and Canada where she substituted a piano player. At the same time she also participated in an American International Songwriting Competition where she got through to a semi-final with her song "You're My Everything".

In spring of 2013 she graduated at English and Czech High School AMAZON. From October 2013 she studied songwriting for three years at the British and Irish Modern Music Institute in London. She successfully graduated in 2016 and received her bachelor's degree.

== Music career ==
In 2013, Lenny signed the contract with Universal Music and on 24 June 2013 released her first EP, called All My Love, with four songs of which three were her own. "All My Love" was written by Australian band Dallas Frasca. Her second Fighter EP was released on 6 December instead of the originally planned debut album. The EP contains five songs of which there are two cover versions – "I'm Ready" by Bryan Adams and "Am I Wrong" by Keb' Mo'. In 2013 Lenny received the Discovery of the Year Award at the Angel Awards, and was also nominated for Discovery of the Year at the Český Slavík Mattoni.

In September 2016 Lenny's debut studio album Hearts was released. She supported it on a club tour Hearts Tour 2016, which lasted for a month, from 30 September to 30 October. Due to its success the tour's prolongation was announced in December. The Hearts Tour 2017 started on 3 March and finished on 25 March. Lenny was nominated for an Apollo Award for her album. In 2016 she was also nominated for a Žebřík Award in the Singer category and for an Angel Award in four categories: Album of the Year (Hearts), Song of the Year ("Hell.o"), Singer of the Year and Video of the Year ("Hell.o"), all of which she won. Besides her main awards she also received an Angel Award in the Rock & Pop category.

Her song "Hell.o" was also successful in Italy, where she was a guest in the local talk show Che tempo che fa on 12 February 2017. In June 2017 she performed the song as a guest of the 11th year of Wind Music Awards in Verona.

In June 2017 Lenny signed a global contract with a German subsidiary of Universal Music, on which she released for the local market a remix of "Hell.o" by an American duo Fancy Cars. On 20 February 2018 Lenny supported British soul singer Emeli Sandé at her concert in Prague's O2 arena. Apart from the songs from her debut album she introduced a new song "Maneater" from her oncoming second album.

In 2018 she became one of the Forbes magazine "30 under 30" personalities who "change the world around".

On 28 November 2023, she was announced as one of the contestants of the Czech national final for the Eurovision Song Contest 2024, competing with the song "Good Enough". On 13 December, it was revealed that she had come fifth.

== Discography ==
=== Studio albums ===
- Hearts (2016)
- Weird & Wonderful (2020)
- Heartbreak Culture (2022)

=== Live albums ===
- Lenny Live (2024)

=== EPs ===
- All My Love (2013)
- Fighter (2013)
- Klenoty (2023)

=== Singles ===
- "All of This" (2014)
- "Bones" (2015)
- "Standing at the Corner of Your Heart" (2016)
- "Hell.o" (2016)
- "My Love" (2016)
- "Enemy" (2018)
- "Home" (2018)
- "Lovers Do" (2019)
- "Figure It Out" (2020)
- "Wake Up" (2020)
- "Samotní nejsme nic" (2021)
- "Overdosed" (2021)
- "Lithium" (2021)
- "Live. Laugh. Cry" (2022)
- "Plastic Flowers" (2022)
- "Heartbreak Culture" (2022)
- "Takeover" (2023)
- "Friendly Spot" (2023)
- "Good Enough" (2023)
- "Hold on to Me" (2025)
- "Told Ya" (2025)
- "Second Guessing" (2026)

== External reference ==
- Official website
