= Aiko (Czech singer) =

Czech singer-songwriter (born 1999)

- Aiko in 2026

Background information
- Born: Alena Shirmanova-Kostebelova; 26 December 1999 (age 26); Moscow, Russia
- Website: www.aikomakesmusic.com
- Musical career
- Origin: Karlovy Vary, Czech Republic
- Occupations: Singer; songwriter
- Years active: 2015–present

Alena Shirmanova-Kostebelova (Russian: Алёна Ширманова-Костебелова, pronounced [ɐˈlʲɵnə ʂɨrˈmanəvə kəsʲtʲɪˈbʲeləvə]; born 26 December 1999), known by her stage name Aiko, is a Russian-Czech singer and songwriter based in Brighton, England. She represented the Czech Republic in the Eurovision Song Contest 2024 with the song "Pedestal".

== Early life ==
Alena Shirmanova-Kostebelova was born in Moscow, Russia. At the age of five, she moved with her family to Karlovy Vary, Czech Republic.

== Career ==
In 2015, Shirmanova participated in the fourth season of the reality talent show Česko Slovenská SuperStar. She then moved to the United Kingdom to pursue a musical career, first settling in London and later in Brighton. Under the stage name Aiko, she released her debut self-titled album in 2018, followed by Expiration Date in 2020, when she released her first single "Hunt". Her stage name originates from a combination of her love for Japanese culture and her childhood nickname 'Ajka'.

She was the first Czech artist to feature on the Times Square screens and the first Czech female to take part in the Spotify Equal Campaign. She performed at the Rock for People, ESNS, Metronome Prague, The Great Escape, Grape, Nouvelle Prague, Sziget and Waves Vienna festivals, as well as following Alice Merton, Black Honey, Lauren Ruth Ward and Tamino in some of their tours as a supporting artist. Some of her songs were included in the TV shows Teen Mom and Love Island.

Aiko released her third album Fortune's Child on 13 October 2023. On 28 November 2023, she was announced as one of the contestants of the Czech national final for the Eurovision Song Contest 2024, competing with the song "Pedestal". On 13 December, she was crowned as the winner of the selection. At the event, she failed to qualify from the second semi-final, placing 11th out of 16 with 38 points.

== Personal life ==
Aiko and Kat Almagro in 2025

Aiko came out as bisexual in May 2024. She is currently in a relationship with Spanish drummer Kat Almagro, who participated in the Eurovision Song Contest 2024 for San Marino as a member of Megara. In 2025 Aiko released a song about their relationship called "Mi amor" in English and Spanish. (In the Spanish version, Kat sings together with Aiko, but in the English version, only Aiko sings.)

Title	Details
Expiration Date	Released: 17 July 2020; Label: Self-released; Formats: Digital download, streaming
Fortune's Child	Released: 13 October 2023; Label: Self-released; Formats: Digital download, streaming
Aikonic	Released: 28 June 2024; Label: 420 Production; Formats: Digital download, streaming

=== Extended plays ===
Title	Details
Aiko	Released: 25 August 2018; Label: Self-released; Formats: Digital download, streaming

=== Singles ===
==== As lead artist ====
Title	Year	Peak chart positions	Album or EP
Title	Year	LTU	Album or EP
"Hunt"	2020	—	Expiration Date
"Power"	2021	—	Fortune's Child
"Daughter of the Sun"	2021	—	Fortune's Child
"Gemini"	2021	—	Fortune's Child
"Alter Ego"	2022	—	Non-album singles
"I Want to Be Perfect"	2022	—	Non-album singles
"Restless" (with Boy Jr.)	2022	—	Fortune's Child
"Instincts"	2023	—	Fortune's Child
"Lucky Streak"	2023	—	Fortune's Child
"Pedestal"	2023	49	Fortune's Child
"White Flag"	2024	—	Aikonic
"Hunger" (with Teya)	2024	—	Aikonic
"Regal"	2024	—	Non-album singles
"Cleopatra"	2025	—	Non-album singles
"Mi amor" (Note: Both in Spanish and English versions.)	2025	—	Non-album singles
"I Need a Minute"	2025	—	Non-album singles
"Shotgun"	2025	—	Non-album singles
"F1 Machine"	2025	—	Non-album singles
"Villainize Me"	2025	—	Non-album singles
"Time"	2025	—	Non-album singles
"Medusa" (with The Silver Spoons)	2026	—	Non-album singles
"Why Not Bby"	2026	—	Non-album singles
"A Class Angel"	2026	—	Non-album singles
"Westside Beach Hotel"	2026	—	Non-album singles
"—" denotes a recording that did not chart or was not released in that territory.

==== As featured artist ====
Single	Year	Album / EP
"Why Don't You" (Ivo Blahunek featuring Aiko)	2023	Non-album single
"The Internet" (Noisy Pots featuring Aiko)	2023	A Trip of Being
"Come Closer" (Tonya Graves and Blanka Maderová featuring Teza and Aiko)	2023	Non-album single

== Notes ==
Awards and achievements
Preceded by Vesna with "My Sister's Crown"	Czech Republic in the Eurovision Song Contest; 2024	Succeeded by Adonxs with "Kiss Kiss Goodbye"
