= France in the Eurovision Song Contest 2024 =

- Eurovision Song Contest 2024
- Participating broadcaster: France Télévisions
- Country: France
- Selection process: Internal selection
- Announcement date: 8 November 2023

Competing entry
- Song: "Mon amour"
- Artist: Slimane
- Songwriters: Meïr Salah; Slimane Nebchi; Yaacov Salah

Placement
- Final result: 4th, 445 points

Participation chronology

France was represented at the Eurovision Song Contest 2024 with the song "Mon amour", written by Slimane Nebchi, Yaacov Salah, and Meïr Salah and performed by Slimane himself. The French participating broadcaster, France Télévisions, internally selected its entry for the contest.

As a member of the "Big Five", France automatically qualified to compete in the final of the Eurovision Song Contest.

== Background ==
Prior to the 2024 contest, France Télévisions and its predecessor national broadcasters have participated in the Eurovision Song Contest representing France sixty-five times since RTF's debut in the inaugural contest. They first won the contest in 1958 with "Dors, mon amour" performed by André Claveau. In the 1960s, they won three times, with "Tom Pillibi" performed by Jacqueline Boyer in 1960, "Un premier amour" performed by Isabelle Aubret in 1962, and "Un jour, un enfant" performed by Frida Boccara, who won in 1969 in a four-way tie with the Netherlands, Spain, and the United Kingdom. Their fifth – and so far latest – victory came in 1977 with "L'oiseau et l'enfant" performed by Marie Myriam. France has also finished second five times, with Paule Desjardins in 1957, Catherine Ferry in 1976, Joëlle Ursull in 1990, Amina in 1991 (who lost out to Sweden's Carola in a tie-break), and Barbara Pravi in 2021. In the 21st century, France has had less success, only making the top ten five times, with Natasha St-Pier finishing fourth in 2001, Sandrine François finishing fifth in 2002, Patricia Kaas finishing eighth in 2009, Amir finishing sixth in 2016, and Pravi finishing second in 2021 with 499 points. In 2023, it finished in 16th place with the song "Évidemment" performed by La Zarra.

As part of its duties as participating broadcaster, France Télévisions organises the selection of its entry in the Eurovision Song Contest and broadcasts the event in the country through France 2. The French broadcasters have used both national finals and internal selections to choose their entries in the past. In 2021 and 2022, the broadcaster selected its entries via the national final Eurovision France, c'est vous qui décidez !, a format which was also planned to be held in 2023 but was ultimately cancelled in favour of an internal selection. In June 2023, France Télévisions confirmed its intention to participate in the 2024 contest.

== Before Eurovision ==
=== Internal selection ===
On 8 November 2023, France Télévisions announced that it had internally selected Slimane with the song "Mon amour" as the French entrant for the 2024 contest. The song, composed by Slimane with Yaacov and Meïr Salah, was presented to the public on the same day, during the evening news bulletin Journal de 20 heures hosted by Anne-Sophie Lapix on France 2.

=== Promotion ===
As part of the promotion of his participation in the contest, Slimane attended the PrePartyES in Madrid on 30 March 2024, the Barcelona Eurovision Party on 6 April 2024, the London Eurovision Party on 7 April 2024, the Eurovision in Concert event in Amsterdam on 13 April 2024, and the Nordic Eurovision Party in Stockholm on 14 April 14 2024. On 22 February 2024, he performed during the first semi-final of the Croatian national final; on 22 March 2024, he was a guest on the Italian TV show La volta buona, broadcast on Rai 1; on 9 April 2024, he performed during the fourth live show of the Francophone Belgian edition of The Voice, broadcast on La Une.

== At Eurovision ==
The Eurovision Song Contest 2024 took place at the Malmö Arena in Malmö, Sweden, and consisted of two semi-finals held on the respective dates of 7 and 9 May and the final on 11 May 2024. All nations with the exceptions of the host country and the "Big Five" (France, Germany, Italy, Spain and the United Kingdom) were required to qualify from one of two semi-finals in order to compete in the final; the top ten countries from each semi-final progress to the final. As a member of the "Big Five", France automatically qualified to compete in the final on 11 May 2024, but was also required to broadcast and vote in one of the two semi-finals. This was decided via a draw held during the semi-final allocation draw on 30 January 2024, when it was announced that France would be voting in the second semi-final. Despite being an automatic qualifier for the final, the French entry was also performed during the semi-final. On 4 May 2024, a draw was held to determine which half of the final each "Big Five" country would perform in; France drew to perform in the second half of the show.

In France, the semi-finals were broadcast on Culturebox, with commentary by Nicky Doll, while the final aired on France 2, with commentary by Stéphane Bern and Laurence Boccolini; live streaming of the shows was also available on the broadcaster's online platform france.tv. In addition, as part of the Eurovision programming, France Télévisions cooperated with DR and SVT alongside other EBU member broadcasters – namely ARD/WDR, the BBC, ČT, ERR, NRK, NTR, RÚV, VRT and Yle – to produce and air a documentary titled ABBA – Against the Odds, on the occasion of the 50th anniversary of Sweden's first victory at the contest with "Waterloo" by ABBA.

=== Performance ===
Slimane took part in technical rehearsals on 2 and 4 May, followed by dress rehearsals on 10 and 11 May. In his performance of "Mon amour" at the contest, he sings the final chorus a cappella.

=== Final ===
On 4 May 2024, a draw was held to determine which half of the final each "Big Five" country would perform in; France drew to perform in the second half of the show. France will perform in position 25, following the entry from Georgia and before the entry from Austria.

=== Voting ===
Below is a breakdown of points awarded to and by France in the second semi-final and in the final. Voting during the three shows involved each country awarding sets of points from 1-8, 10 and 12: one from their professional jury and the other from televoting in the final vote, while the semi-final vote was based entirely on the vote of the public. The French jury consisted of Valérie Dissaux, Élise Mollet, Fanny Llado, Pierre Suppa, and Sébastien Surel D'Assigny. In the final, France placed 4th with 445 points, receiving twelve points from Armenia in the televote, and from Armenia, Belgium, Iceland and Slovenia in the jury vote. Over the course of the contest, France awarded its 12 points to Israel in the second semi-final and in the televote at the final, and to Portugal in the jury vote at the final.

France Télévisions appointed Natasha St-Pier, who represented France in the 2001 contest, as its spokesperson to announce the French jury's votes in the final.

==== Points awarded to France ====
Points awarded to France (Final)
Score	Televote	Jury
12 points	Armenia	Armenia; Belgium; Iceland; Slovenia
10 points	Belgium; Greece; Iceland; Serbia	Cyprus; Denmark; Georgia; Germany; Latvia; Luxembourg; Netherlands; Norway
8 points	Luxembourg; Portugal	Serbia
7 points	Cyprus; Denmark; Lithuania; Malta; Norway; Poland; Slovenia; Switzerland	Estonia; Greece; Lithuania; Spain
6 points	Albania; Austria; Croatia; Georgia; Germany; Italy; Latvia; Moldova; San Marino; Sweden; Ukraine	Malta; Moldova; Ukraine
5 points	Estonia; Netherlands; Spain	Austria; Finland; Sweden; Switzerland
4 points	Czechia; Finland; Ireland	Croatia; Czechia
3 points		Ireland; Poland
2 points	Australia; Azerbaijan; Israel; Rest of the World; United Kingdom	
1 point		Israel; Italy

==== Points awarded by France ====
Points awarded by France (Semi-final 2)
Score	Televote
12 points	Israel
10 points	Armenia
8 points	Switzerland
7 points	Netherlands
6 points	Georgia
5 points	Belgium
4 points	Greece
3 points	Norway
2 points	Estonia
1 point	Malta

Points awarded by France (Final)
Score	Televote	Jury
12 points	Israel	Portugal
10 points	Armenia	Ukraine
8 points	Ukraine	Germany
7 points	Croatia	Luxembourg
6 points	Switzerland	Armenia
5 points	Portugal	Switzerland
4 points	Italy	Greece
3 points	Luxembourg	Israel
2 points	Spain	Croatia
1 point	Greece	Lithuania

==== Detailed voting results ====
Each participating broadcaster assembles a five-member jury panel consisting of music industry professionals who are citizens of the country they represent. Each jury, and individual jury member, is required to meet a strict set of criteria regarding professional background, as well as diversity in gender and age. No member of a national jury was permitted to be related in any way to any of the competing acts in such a way that they cannot vote impartially and independently. The individual rankings of each jury member as well as the nation's televoting results were released shortly after the grand final.

The following members comprised the French jury:

- Valérie Dissaux
- Élise Mollet
- Fanny Llado
- Pierre Suppa
- Sébastien Surel D'Assigny

Detailed voting results from France (Semi-final 2)
R/O	Country	Televote	
R/O	Country	Rank	Points
01	Malta	10	1
02	Albania	15	
03	Greece	7	4
04	Switzerland	3	8
05	Czechia	14	
06	Austria	11	
07	Denmark	13	
08	Armenia	2	10
09	Latvia	12	
10	San Marino	16	
11	Georgia	5	6
12	Belgium	6	5
13	Estonia	9	2
14	Israel	1	12
15	Norway	8	3
16	Netherlands	4	7

Detailed voting results from France (Final)
R/O	Country	Jury							Televote	
R/O	Country	Juror A	Juror B	Juror C	Juror D	Juror E	Rank	Points	Rank	Points
01	Sweden	3	17	16	14	10	11		22	
02	Ukraine	5	7	1	1	19	2	10	3	8
03	Germany	1	2	15	7	4	3	8	16	
04	Luxembourg	7	1	8	2	12	4	7	8	3
~~05~~	~~Netherlands~~ ‡ (Note: The Netherlands was disqualified prior to the final.)	~~10~~	~~9~~	~~10~~	~~15~~	~~7~~	~~14~~		N/A	
06	Israel	17	11	5	16	2	8	3	1	12
07	Lithuania	9	15	14	8	5	10	1	12	
08	Spain	19	13	13	13	11	17		9	2
09	Estonia	25	21	25	22	22	24		19	
10	Ireland	12	14	21	17	20	18		11	
11	Latvia	20	16	12	20	17	19		15	
12	Greece	8	12	6	11	3	7	4	10	1
13	United Kingdom	18	23	17	21	21	21		23	
14	Norway	22	6	11	6	18	13		17	
15	Italy	16	8	9	9	8	12		7	4
16	Serbia	21	22	24	23	23	23		20	
17	Finland	23	25	20	24	25	25		18	
18	Portugal	2	4	7	5	1	1	12	6	5
19	Armenia	13	5	2	4	6	5	6	2	10
20	Cyprus	14	24	18	18	13	20		21	
21	Switzerland	11	3	4	3	9	6	5	5	6
22	Slovenia	24	18	19	25	24	22		24	
23	Croatia	15	10	3	10	15	9	2	4	7
24	Georgia	6	19	23	12	16	16		14	
25	France									
26	Austria	4	20	22	19	14	15		13	
