= Ukraine in the Eurovision Song Contest 2024 =

- Eurovision Song Contest 2024
- Participating broadcaster: Public Broadcasting Company of Ukraine (Suspilne)
- Country: Ukraine
- Selection process: Vidbir 2024
- Selection date: 4 February 2024

Competing entry
- Song: "Teresa & Maria"
- Artist: Alyona Alyona and Jerry Heil
- Songwriters: Aliona Savranenko; Anton Chilibi; Ivan Klymenko; Yana Shemaieva

Placement
- Semi-final result: Qualified (2nd, 173 points)
- Final result: 3rd, 453 points

Participation chronology

Ukraine was represented at the Eurovision Song Contest 2024 with the song "Teresa & Maria", written by Aliona Savranenko, Anton Chilibi, Ivan Klymenko, and Yana Shemaieva, and performed by Savranenko and Shemaieva themselves under their stage names Alyona Alyona and Jerry Heil. The Ukrainian participating broadcaster, Suspilne, organised the national final Vidbir 2024 in order to select its entry for the contest.

Ukraine was drawn to compete in the first semi-final of the Eurovision Song Contest which took place on 7 May 2024 and was later selected to perform in position 5. At the end of the show, "Teresa & Maria" was announced among the top 10 entries of the first semi-final and hence qualified to compete in the final. It was later revealed that Ukraine placed second out of the fifteen participating countries in the semi-final with 173 points. In the final, Ukraine performed in position 2 and placed third out of the 25 performing countries, scoring a total of 453 points.

== Background ==
Prior to the 2024 contest, the National Television Company of Ukraine (NTU) until 2016, and the Public Broadcasting Company of Ukraine (UA:PBC/Suspilne) since 2017, had participated in the Eurovision Song Contest representing Ukraine eighteen times since NTU's first entry in 2003, winning the contest in 2004 with the song "Wild Dances" by Ruslana. They won the contest for a second time in 2016 with "1944" by Jamala, and for a third time in 2022 with "Stefania" by Kalush Orchestra. They had been the runner-up in the contest on two occasions: in 2007 with the song "Dancing Lasha Tumbai" performed by Verka Serduchka and in 2008 with the song "Shady Lady" performed by Ani Lorak. Following the introduction of semi-finals for 2004, Ukraine was the only country that had managed to qualify to the final in every contest they have participated in thus far. Their least successful result was 24th place, which it achieved as host in 2017 with the song "Time" by O.Torvald. In 2023, "Heart of Steel" by Tvorchi finished sixth in the final where Ukraine was automatically qualified as the winner of the previous edition.

As part of its duties as participating broadcaster, Suspilne organises the selection of its entry in the Eurovision Song Contest and broadcasts the event in the country. In the past, the Ukrainian broadcaster alternated between both internal selections and national finals in order to select its entries. Between 2016 and 2020, and again since 2022, Suspilne has set up national finals with several artists to choose the song and performer to compete at Eurovision, with both the public and a panel of jury members involved in the selection. On 7 July 2023, Suspilne confirmed its intention to take part in the 2024 contest. A national final format was confirmed in late August as the selection method. 1+1 Media Group was announced on 12 December 2023 as the production company for the national final.

== Before Eurovision ==
=== Vidbir 2024 ===
Vidbir 2024 was the eighth edition of Vidbir, the competition that determines the Ukrainian entry for the Eurovision Song Contest. The competition consisted of a final held on 3 February 2024 at the National Museum of the History of Ukraine in the Second World War in Kyiv. It was hosted by Julia Sanina, Timur Miroshnychenko and Vasyl Baidak, with Anna Tulieva presenting the pre-show and backstage segments. The show was broadcast on Suspilne Kultura and Radio Promin, as well as on Suspilne's online platforms with English-language commentary by Viktoriia Kriukova and Denys Denysenko available.

==== Format ====
The selection of the competing entries for the national final took place over four stages. In the first stage, artists and songwriters could apply for the competition through an online submission form. For the second year in a row, Dmytro Shurov was the music producer of the event, who was in charge of reviewing the received submissions and select a longlist of 20 participants, announced on 9 November 2023. In the second stage, longlisted artists – divided into two sets of ten – were assessed at two live auditions, with ten acts, announced on 17 November 2023, directly qualifying for the final. The third stage consisted of a public online vote among the longlisted artists who did not pass the previous phase, determining the eleventh finalist, who was announced on 21 December 2023. The eleven selected artists took part in a final on 3 February 2024, where the winner was determined by a 50/50 combination of jury and public votes – the latter being cast through the Diia application.

The three members of the expert jury for Vidbir 2024 were selected among nine candidates also via a public online vote on Diia, open to all Ukrainian citizens from 15 to 22 January 2024. A total of 720,841 votes were cast, with Andriy Danylko, Jamala and Serhiy Tanchynets being determined as the jurors.

Vidbir 2024 judges

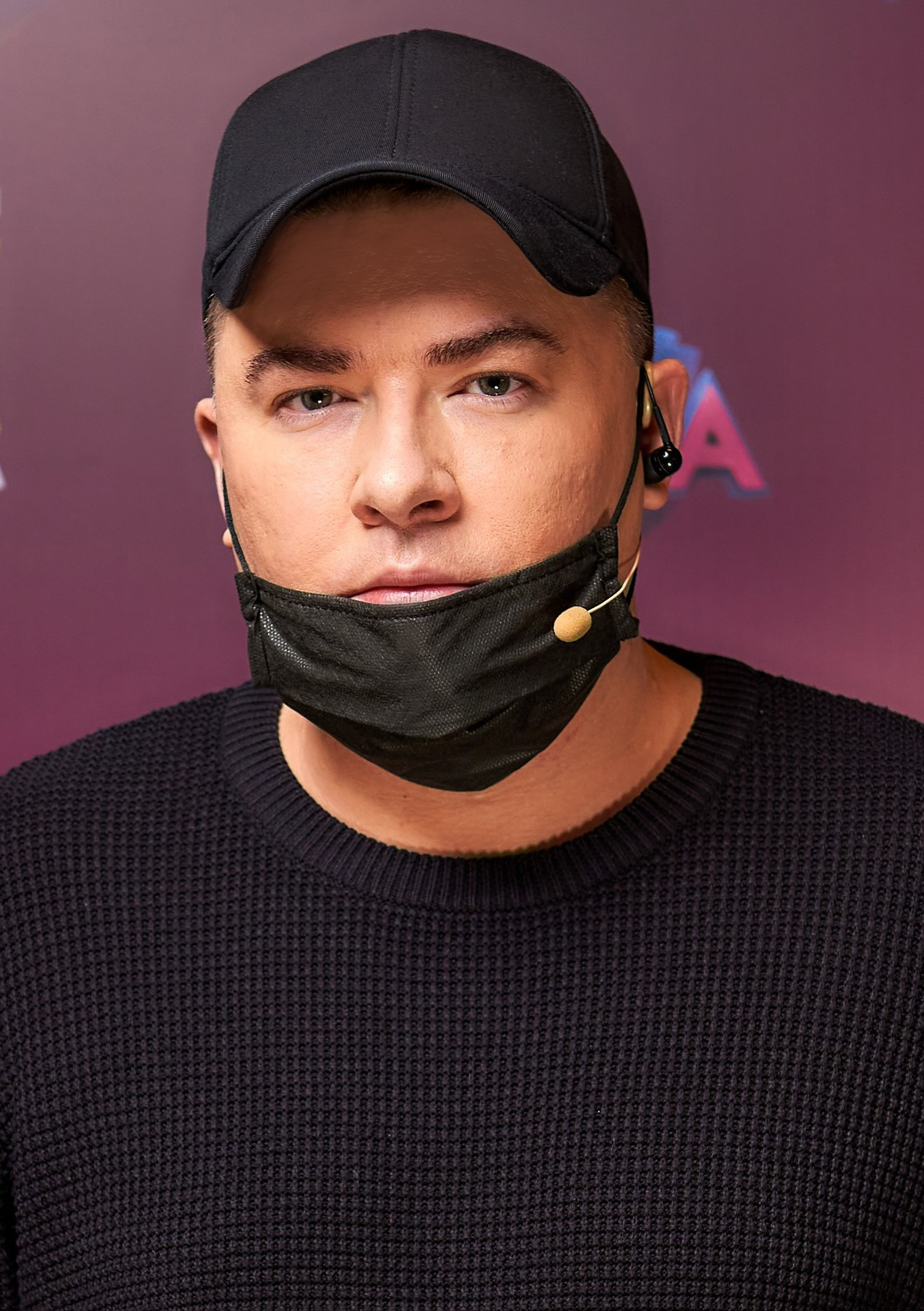
Andriy Danylko

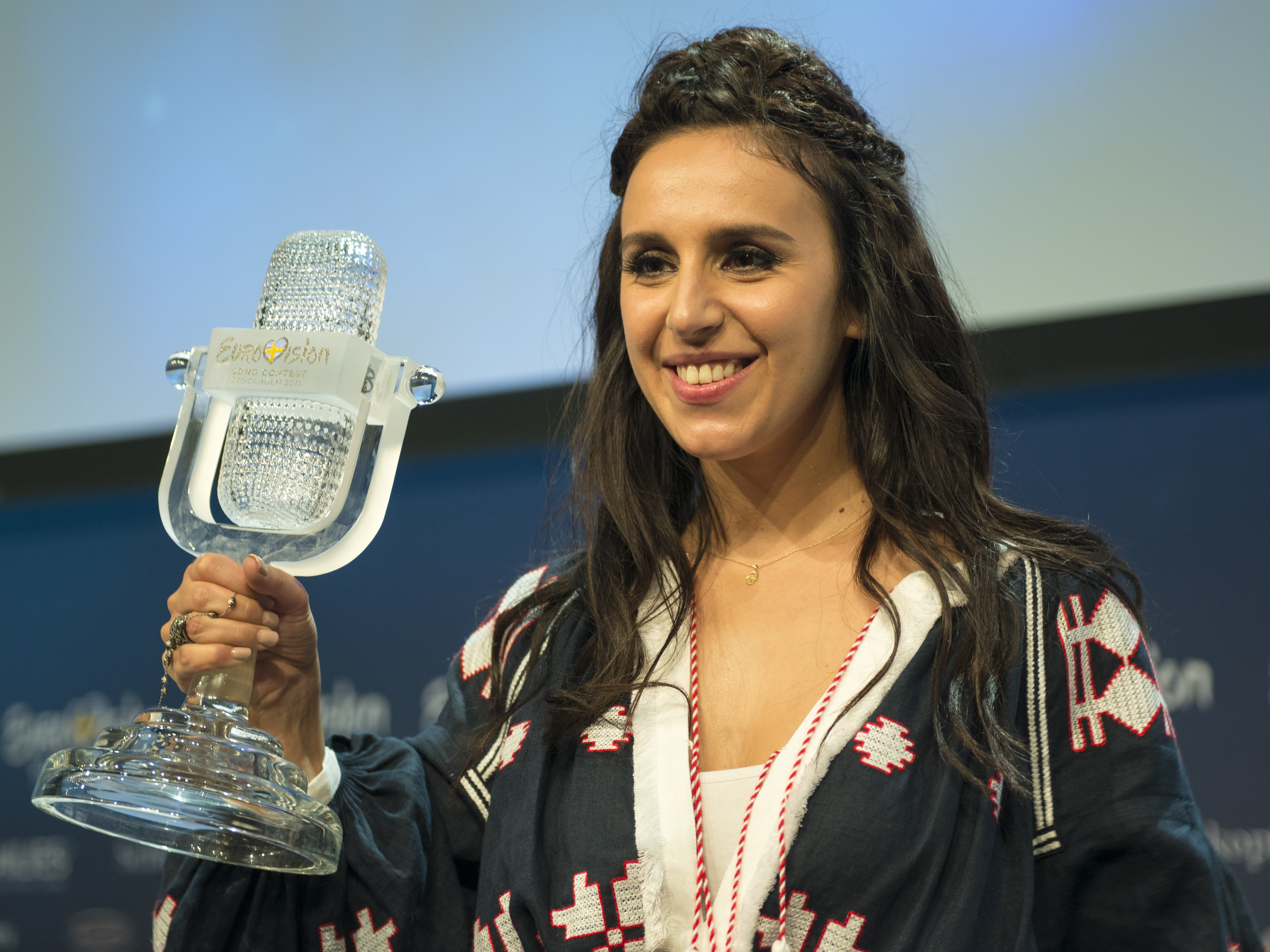
Jamala

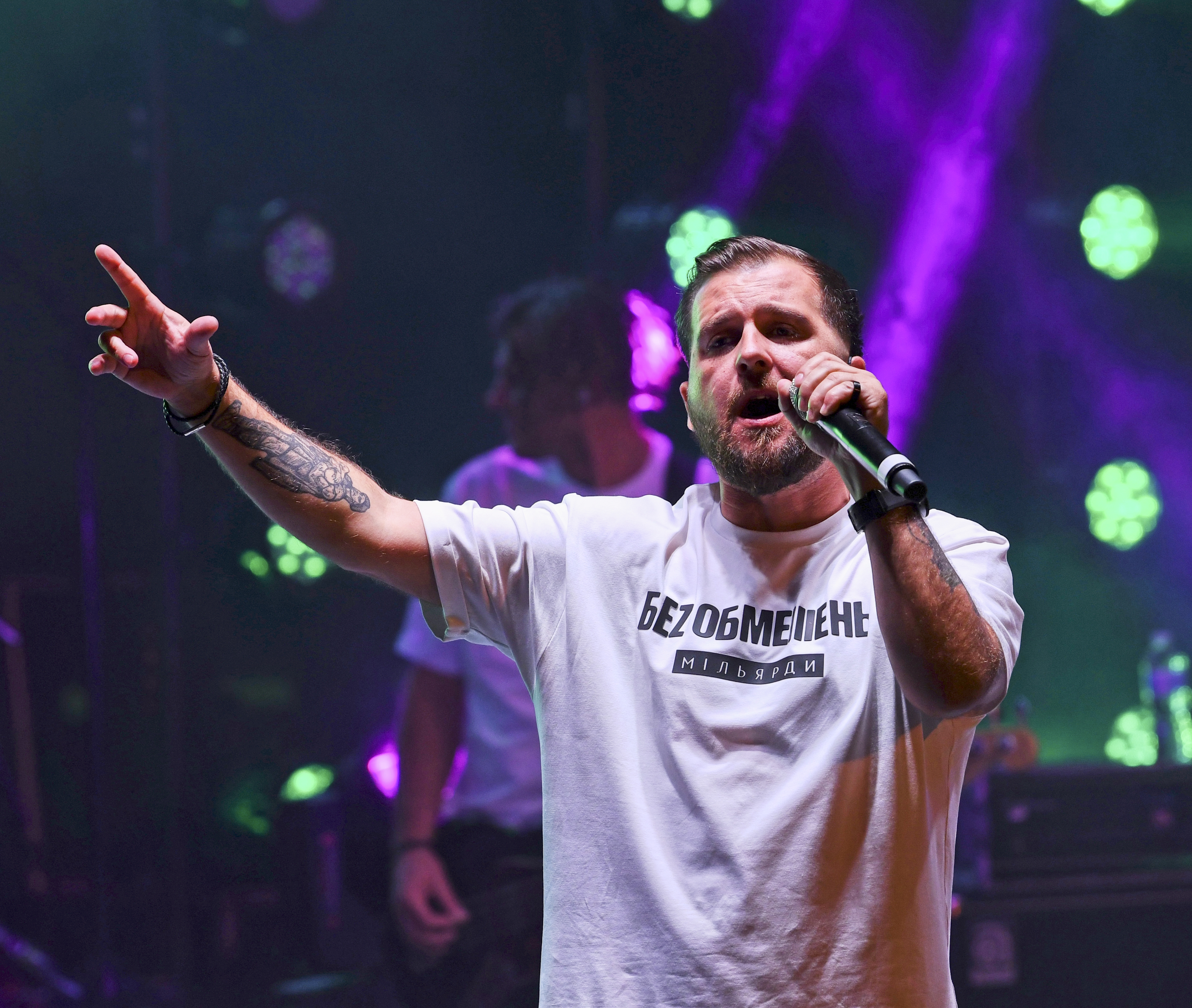
Serhiy Tanchynets

Jury member selection
Candidate	Occupation	Score	Result
**Andriy Danylko**	**Ukrainian representative in the Eurovision Song Contest 2007 as Verka Serduchka**	**43.79%**	**Selected**
**Jamala**	**Winner of Vidbir 2016 and of the Eurovision Song Contest 2016**	**23.62%**	**Selected**
Kateryna Pavlenko	Winner of Vidbir 2020 and Ukrainian representative in the Eurovision Song Contest 2021 as part of Go_A	10.06%	Not selected
Oleksandr Varenytsia	Music manager and journalist	1.20%	Not selected
Olena Koliadenko	Choreographer and music producer	1.97%	Not selected
Pavlo Shylko	Co-host of the Eurovision Song Contest 2005	1.37%	Not selected
**Serhiy Tanchynets**	**Music producer, singer and musician**	**12.42%**	**Selected**
Yevhen Khmara	Composer and pianist	4.71%	Not selected
Yevhen Triplov	Music producer, singer and songwriter	0.86%	Not selected

==== Competing entries ====
The submission period for interested artists was open between 30 August and 22 October 2023. Each candidate could submit as many songs as they wished. At the closing of the application window, 389 entries had been received from 288 performers, mainly in English and Ukrainian. The selected finalists (marked in bold the table below) included Mélovin, who represented Ukraine in the 2018 contest; their songs were set to be released on 12 January, but were released on the official Eurovision Ukraine channel the day before. A presentation event hosted by Timur Miroshnychenko was held on 11 January 2024, where the competing songs were introduced and the running order of the final was drawn.

Longlisted artists
- **Alyona Alyona and Jerry Heil**
- Anka
- Carpetman
- **Drevo**
- **Ingret**
- ~~Julia Belei~~ (Note: Belei withdrew from the competition before the online voting round was opened.)
- Karyotype
- Krylata
- **Mélovin**
- **Nahaba**
- **Nazva**
- Parfeniuk
- Shépa
- **Skylerr**
- Stasya
- Swoiia
- Teslenko
- **Yagódy**
- **Yaktak**
- **Ziferblat**

Online wildcard – 21 December 2023
Artist	Song	Songwriter(s)	Votes	Place
**Anka**	**"Palala" (Палала)**	**Anna Korchenova**	**80,944**	**1**
Carpetman	"Endless Fight"	Anton Chilibi; Denys Mazorchuk	27,328	5
Karyotype	"Sadness"	Danylo Kuka	19,954	9
Krylata	"Queen"	Anastasiia Zavadska; Eshtar Radi; Leonid Petrovskyi; Yevhenii Bardachenko	31,268	3
Parfeniuk	"Sered vitriv" (Серед вітрів)	Illia Parfeniuk; Serhii Yermolaiev	42,931	2
Shépa	"Supernova"	Anna Nesterova; Finn Tyler	25,729	6
Stasya	"Rika"	Anastasiia Chaban; Oleksandr Pryshliak	30,040	4
Swoiia	"Little Angels"	Oleksii Potapenko; Vadym Alkhutov	23,357	7
Teslenko	"Lights Go Up"	Oleksandr Krizhevich; Andrii Prudnikov; Oleksandr Teslenko	20,648	8

Vidbir 2024 participating entries
Artist	Song	Songwriter(s)
Alyona Alyona and Jerry Heil	"Teresa & Maria"	Aliona Savranenko; Anton Chilibi; Ivan Klymenko; Yana Shemaieva
Anka	"Palala" (Палала)	Anna Korchenova
Drevo	"Endless Chain"	Maksym Derevianchuk
Ingret	"Keeper"	Dmytro Tsyhanenko; Ingret Kostenko
Mélovin	"Dreamer"	Kostiantyn Bocharov; Oleksandr Biliak
Nahaba	"Glasss"	Andrii Naumenko; Olha Kakasiian
Nazva	"Slavic English"	Pavlo Gots
Skylerr (Note: Announced her intention to withdraw her candidacy on 4 February, due to issues regarding the tabulation of the votes following the failure of the Diia app during the final. Suspilne later stated that she would remain a part of the contest as the rules prohibited a withdrawal at that stage, though she would have the option to refuse to go to Eurovision in case of her victory.)	"Time Is Running Out"	Vladyslav Stupak; Valeriia Kudriavets; Nazarii Savchuk; Nikita Kiseliov
Yagódy	"Tsunamia"	Viktoriia Solovyiuk; Serhii Svirskyi; Teymuraz Gogitidze
Yaktak	"Lalala"	Yaroslav Karpuk; Vasyl Kozma
Ziferblat	"Place I Call Home"	Danylo Leshchynskyi; Valentyn Leshchynskyi

==== Final ====
The final took place on 3 February 2024. In addition to the competing entries, the guest performers included Ruslana with "Wild Dances", Tvorchi with "Heart of Steel", Kalush Orchestra with "Stefania", Jamala with "Mii brate", Verka Serduchka with "Swedish Lullaby", Tina Karol with "Troiandy", and Anastasia Dymyd and Svitlana Tarabarova with "Kvitka". After the performances were completed, the Diia app crashed, leading to an extension of the voting window and a delay in the announcement of the results, which was ultimately rescheduled for 4 February. 1,167,185 Ukrainians ultimately voted on the app. Alyona Alyona and Jerry Heil were declared the winners with the song "Teresa & Maria".

Final – 3 February 2024
R/O	Artist	Song	Jury	Public vote		Total	Place
R/O	Artist	Song	Jury	Votes	Points	Total	Place
1	Yaktak	"Lalala"	6	107,227	10	16	4
2	Ingret	"Keeper"	8	15,238	2	10	6
3	Nazva	"Slavic English"	2	14,852	1	3	11
4	Anka	"Palala"	5	19,183	4	9	8
5	Drevo	"Endless Chain"	4	16,235	3	7	9
6	**Alyona Alyona and Jerry Heil**	**"Teresa & Maria"**	**10**	**723,297**	**11**	**21**	**1**
7	Mélovin	"Dreamer"	9	82,838	9	18	3
8	Skylerr	"Time Is Running Out"	3	38,177	6	9	7
9	Ziferblat	"Place I Call Home"	11	64,276	8	19	2
10	Yagódy	"Tsunamia"	7	62,269	7	14	5
11	Nahaba	"Glasss"	1	23,593	5	6	10

===== Controversy =====
Following the results announcement, Mélovin, who had come third with both the juries and the audience, expressed doubtfulness about the difference of over 600,000 public votes between the first and the second place, attributing it to a possible error in the vote count as a result of Diia's crash. He subsequently clarified that his statements were not intended to discredit the validity of Alyona Alyona and Jerry Heil's victory.

=== Promotion ===
As part of the promotion of their participation in the contest, Alyona Alyona and Jerry Heil attended the LRT Radarom marathon in Vilnius in late February 2024, held to raise funds for the Ukrainian military, as well as the PrePartyES in Madrid on 30 March 2024 and the Eurovision in Concert event in Amsterdam on 13 April 2024. In addition, they performed on the Dutch talkshow Sophie & Jeroen, broadcast on NPO 1, on 12 April 2024. Before departing for Malmö, the duo announced that it would team up with Ukrainian fundraising platform United24 to raise the ₴10 million necessary to rebuild a school in Velyka Kostromka in Kryvyi Rih Raion, which was destroyed by a Russian rocket in October 2022 amid the Russian invasion of Ukraine, and that in case of victory at the contest, the trophy would also be sold to collect funds.

== At Eurovision ==
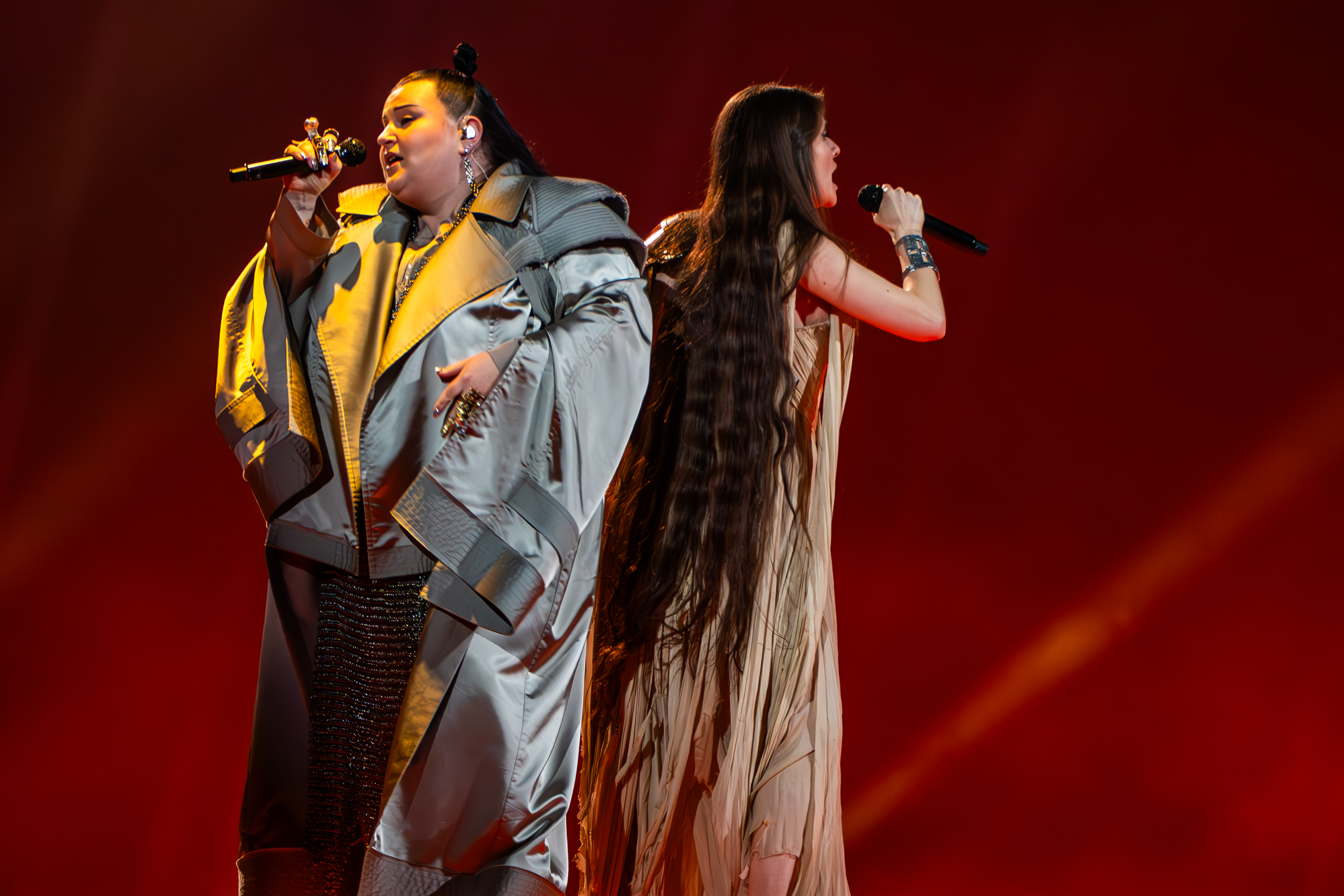
Jerry Heil and Alyona Alyona during a rehearsal before the final.

The Eurovision Song Contest 2024 took place at the Malmö Arena in Malmö, Sweden, and consisted of two semi-finals held on the respective dates of 7 and 9 May and the final on 11 May 2024. All nations with the exceptions of the host country and the "Big Five" (France, Germany, Italy, Spain and the United Kingdom) were required to qualify from one of two semi-finals in order to compete in the final; the top ten countries from each semi-final progressed to the final. On 30 January 2024, an allocation draw was held to determine which of the two semi-finals, as well as which half of the show, each country would perform in; the European Broadcasting Union (EBU) split up the competing countries into different pots based on voting patterns from previous contests, with countries with favourable voting histories put into the same pot. Ukraine was scheduled for the first half of the first semi-final. The shows' producers then decided the running order for the semi-finals; Ukraine was set to perform in position 5.

In Ukraine, all three shows were broadcast on Suspilne Kultura, with commentary by Timur Miroshnychenko (joined by Vasyl Baidak for the final), and on Radio Promin, with commentary by Dmytro Zakharchenko and Lesia Antypenko (Note: The broadcasts of the semi-finals mostly featured TV commentary by Miroshnychenko. Only the second recaps (which Miroshnychenko left unnarrated on TV) and the results announcements were commentated on by Zakharchenko and Antypenko.) as well as Anna Zakletska reporting from Malmö. The television broadcasts were also available on the broadcaster's online platforms and with optional interpretation in Ukrainian Sign Language by Tetiana Zhurkova, Inna Petrova, Iryna Skolotova, Yuliia Porplik, Anfisa Boldusieva and Lada Sokoliuk. In addition, as part of the Eurovision programming, between 5 April and 3 May 2024, Radio Promin aired the special weekly broadcast Pobachennia z Yevrobachenniam, with Dmytro Zakharchenko, Lesia Antypenko, Anna Zakletska and Denys Denysenko discussing various aspects of the contest.

=== Performance ===
Alyona Alyona and Jerry Heil took part in technical rehearsals on 27 April and 1 May, followed by dress rehearsals on 6 and 7 May. The staging of their performance of "Teresa & Maria" at the contest was directed by Tanu Muino and involved a rock-shaped prop which Jerry Heil climbed as the performance progressed.

=== Semi-final ===
Ukraine performed in position 5, following the entry from Ireland and before the entry from Poland. At the end of the show, the country was announced as a qualifier for the final. It was later revealed that Ukraine placed second out of the fifteen participating countries in the first semi-final with 173 points.

=== Final ===
Following the semi-final, Ukraine drew "producer's choice" for the final, meaning that the country will perform in the half decided by the contest's producers. Ukraine performed in position 2, following the entry from Sweden and before the entry from Germany. Jerry Heil and Alyona Alyona once again took part in dress rehearsals on 10 and 11 May before the final, including the jury final where the professional juries cast their final votes before the live show on 11 May. They performed a repeat of their semi-final performance during the final on 11 May. Ukraine placed third in the final, scoring 453 points; 307 points from the public televoting and 146 points from the juries.

=== Voting ===
Below is a breakdown of points awarded by and to Ukraine in the first semi-final and in the final. Voting during the three shows involved each country awarding sets of points from 1-8, 10 and 12: one from their professional jury and the other from televoting in the final vote, while the semi-final vote was based entirely on the vote of the public. In the first semi-final, Ukraine placed second with 173 points, receiving maximum twelve points from Cyprus, Lithuania, Poland, Portugal and the Rest of the World vote. In the final, Ukraine placed third with 453 points, receiving twelve points in the televote from Czechia, Estonia, Georgia, Lithuania, Malta, Moldova, and Poland, and in the jury vote from Czechia and Moldova. Over the course of the contest, Ukraine awarded its 12 points to Croatia in the first semi-final, and Switzerland in both the jury vote and televote in the final.

The Ukrainian jury for the contest, like in Vidbir, was selected via a public online vote in the Diia application. Ten candidates were presented to the public and a voting was open to all Ukrainian citizens from 25 March to 1 April 2024, with the five candidates topping the online voting being selected to become jurors and the most voted becoming the chair. A total of 235,572 votes were cast, with the Ukrainian jury ultimately consisting of Alyosha, who represented Ukraine in the 2010 contest, Iryna Horova, Olena Koliadenko, Maksim Nahorniak and Kostiantyn Tomilchenko.

Suspilne appointed Jamala, who won the 2016 contest for Ukraine, as its spokesperson to announce the Ukrainian jury's votes in the final.

Jury member selection
Candidate	Occupation	Votes	Result
Alyosha	Singer-songwriter, Ukrainian representative in the Eurovision Song Contest 2010	90,221	Selected
Anna Sviridova	Musician, radio and TV presenter	Unknown	Not selected
Fiїnka	Singer-songwriter, finalist of Vidbir 2023	21,941	Not selected (Note: Fiїnka received more votes than Maksim Nahorniak, but she had to withdraw from the jury due to the EBU's gender equality requirements.)
Iryna Horova	Record producer	28,469	Selected
Kostiantyn Tomilchenko	Choreographer, creative producer of TV shows Ukrayina maye talant, X-Factor and Maska	24,079	Selected
Maksim Nahorniak	Blogger, music critic	21,544	Selected
Oleksandr Varenytsia	PR specialist, international promoter of Ukrainian music	Unknown	Not selected
Oleksii Bondarenko	Music columnist	Unknown	Not selected
Olena Koliadenko	Choreographer, stage director, producer	24,265	Selected
Yevhen Triplov	Songwriter, record producer	Unknown	Not selected

==== Points awarded to Ukraine ====
Points awarded to Ukraine (Semi-final 1)
Score	Televote
12 points	Cyprus; Lithuania; Poland; Portugal; Rest of the World
10 points	Azerbaijan; Finland; Germany; Iceland; Moldova; Sweden
8 points	Australia; Croatia; Ireland; Luxembourg; Slovenia
7 points	United Kingdom
6 points	Serbia
5 points	
4 points	
3 points	
2 points	
1 point	

Points awarded to Ukraine (Final)
Score	Televote	Jury
12 points	Czechia; Estonia; Georgia; Lithuania; Malta; Moldova; Poland	Czechia; Moldova
10 points	Denmark; Israel; Italy; Latvia; Portugal; Rest of the World; San Marino; Spain	Estonia; France; Poland
8 points	Azerbaijan; Croatia; Cyprus; France; Germany; Ireland; Netherlands; Norway; Slovenia; Sweden	Finland; Israel; Latvia
7 points	Albania; Austria; Belgium; Luxembourg	Croatia
6 points	Australia; Finland; Switzerland; United Kingdom	Austria; Denmark; Lithuania; Portugal
5 points	Iceland	Georgia; Luxembourg
4 points		Germany; Norway
3 points	Armenia; Greece	Iceland; Sweden
2 points		Greece; Ireland; Netherlands; Switzerland
1 point		Australia; Azerbaijan; Cyprus; Belgium; Serbia

==== Points awarded by Ukraine ====
Points awarded by Ukraine (Semi-final 1)
Score	Televote
12 points	Croatia
10 points	Lithuania
8 points	Ireland
7 points	Luxembourg
6 points	Finland
5 points	Australia
4 points	Moldova
3 points	Poland
2 points	Portugal
1 point	Azerbaijan

Points awarded by Ukraine (Final)
Score	Televote	Jury
12 points	Switzerland	Switzerland
10 points	Croatia	Ireland
8 points	Ireland	Sweden
7 points	Lithuania	Germany
6 points	France	France
5 points	Latvia	Lithuania
4 points	Estonia	Croatia
3 points	Norway	Portugal
2 points	Finland	Italy
1 point	Armenia	Luxembourg

==== Detailed voting results ====
Each participating broadcaster assembles a five-member jury panel consisting of music industry professionals who are citizens of the country they represent. Each jury, and individual jury member, is required to meet a strict set of criteria regarding professional background, as well as diversity in gender and age. No member of a national jury was permitted to be related in any way to any of the competing acts in such a way that they cannot vote impartially and independently. The individual rankings of each jury member as well as the nation's televoting results were released shortly after the grand final.

The following members comprised the Ukrainian jury:

- Olena Topolia (Alyosha) – jury chairperson
- Iryna Horova
- Olena Koliadenko
- Maksim Nahorniak
- Kostiantyn Tomilchenko

Detailed voting results from Ukraine (Semi-final 1)
R/O	Country	Televote	
R/O	Country	Rank	Points
01	Cyprus	12	
02	Serbia	13	
03	Lithuania	2	10
04	Ireland	3	8
05	Ukraine		
06	Poland	8	3
07	Croatia	1	12
08	Iceland	14	
09	Slovenia	11	
10	Finland	5	6
11	Moldova	7	4
12	Azerbaijan	10	1
13	Australia	6	5
14	Portugal	9	2
15	Luxembourg	4	7

Detailed voting results from Ukraine (Final)
R/O	Country	Jury							Televote	
R/O	Country	Juror A	Juror B	Juror C	Juror D	Juror E	Rank	Points	Rank	Points
01	Sweden	2	4	6	4	10	3	8	16	
02	Ukraine									
03	Germany	3	5	13	3	8	4	7	15	
04	Luxembourg	21	10	10	6	7	10	1	13	
~~05~~	~~Netherlands~~ ‡ (Note: The Netherlands was disqualified prior to the final.)	~~22~~	~~24~~	~~19~~	~~17~~	~~20~~	~~24~~		N/A	
06	Israel	18	25	20	20	16	22		11	
07	Lithuania	7	6	3	7	5	6	5	4	7
08	Spain	20	23	12	18	25	19		17	
09	Estonia	17	22	21	19	24	25		7	4
10	Ireland	5	3	1	2	6	2	10	3	8
11	Latvia	10	15	8	13	15	11		6	5
12	Greece	15	18	25	22	17	20		21	
13	United Kingdom	13	12	11	14	12	13		14	
14	Norway	12	14	14	23	23	16		8	3
15	Italy	14	8	4	11	4	9	2	12	
16	Serbia	11	21	16	24	22	17		24	
17	Finland	9	11	17	15	13	12		9	2
18	Portugal	6	9	7	8	3	8	3	22	
19	Armenia	19	16	18	16	9	15		10	1
20	Cyprus	23	13	22	9	14	14		18	
21	Switzerland	1	1	2	1	1	1	12	1	12
22	Slovenia	24	17	15	25	21	21		23	
23	Croatia	8	7	9	5	2	7	4	2	10
24	Georgia	16	20	23	21	19	23		19	
25	France	4	2	5	10	11	5	6	5	6
26	Austria	25	19	24	12	18	18		20	
