= Netherlands in the Eurovision Song Contest 2024 =

- Eurovision Song Contest 2024
- Participating broadcaster: AVROTROS
- Country: Netherlands
- Selection process: Internal selection
- Announcement date: Artist: 11 December 2023; Song: 29 February 2024

Competing entry
- Song: "Europapa"
- Artist: Joost Klein
- Songwriters: Donny Ellerström; Dylan van Dael; Joost Klein; Paul Elstak; Teun de Kruif; Thijmen Melissant; Tim Haars

Placement
- Semi-final result: Qualified (2nd, 182 points)
- Final result: Disqualified (Note: Despite qualifying for the final, the entry was removed from the competition following a backstage incident during the semi-final, though the Netherlands retained the right to vote in the final.)

Participation chronology

The Netherlands was represented at the Eurovision Song Contest 2024 with the song "Europapa", written by Donny Ellerström, Dylan van Dael, Joost Klein, Paul Elstak, Teun de Kruif, Thijmen Melissant, and Tim Haars, and performed by Klein himself. The Dutch participating broadcaster, AVROTROS, internally selected its entry for the contest. Klein's appointment as the Dutch representative was announced on 11 December 2023, while the song, "Europapa", was presented to the public on 29 February 2024.

The Netherlands was drawn to compete in the second semi-final of the Eurovision Song Contest which took place on 9 May 2024. Performing as the closing entry during the show in position 16, "Europapa" was announced among the top 10 entries of the second semi-final and therefore qualified to compete in the final on 11 May. It was later revealed that the Netherlands placed second out of the 16 participating countries in the semi-final with 182 points. However, following a backstage incident involving Klein and a production staff member shortly after his semi-final performance, the Netherlands was disqualified from the final, where it was set to perform in position 5. It was the first, and to date only, time that an entry was disqualified during the contest.

== Background ==
Prior to the 2024 contest, AVROTROS and its predecessor national broadcasters had participated in the Eurovision Song Contest representing the Netherlands sixty-three times since NTS's debut in the inaugural contest in 1956. Since then, they had won the event five times: in 1957 with the song "Net als toen" performed by Corry Brokken, in 1959 with the song "Een Beetje" by Teddy Scholten, in 1969 as one of four countries to tie for first place with "De troubadour" by Lenny Kuhr, in 1975 with "Ding-a-dong" by the group Teach-In, and in 2019 with "Arcade" by Duncan Laurence. Following the introduction of semi-finals for the 2004 contest, they had featured in nine finals. They ended last on five occasions, most recently in the second semi-final of the 2011 contest. In 2023, "Burning Daylight" by Mia Nicolai and Dion Cooper failed to qualify for the final.

As part of its duties as participating broadcaster, AVROTROS organises the selection of its entry in the Eurovision Song Contest and broadcasts the event in the country. The Dutch broadcaster had used various methods to select its entry in the past, such as the Nationaal Songfestival, a live televised national final to choose the performer, song or both to compete at Eurovision. Internal selections had also been held on numerous occasions, including every year since 2013. In May 2023, AVROTROS confirmed its participation in the 2024 contest, later confirming on 12 July that it would continue to internally select both the artist and song for the contest.

== Before Eurovision ==
=== Internal selection ===
On 12 July 2023, AVROTROS opened a submission window where artists and composers would be able to submit up to three entries until 30 September 2023. For the first time, applying composers were not required to indicate a performer for their song, who would be selected afterwards; however, precedence would be given to complete submissions. By the end of the application period, a record 613 songs – mostly in English, with about a hundred in Dutch – had been submitted to the broadcaster.

The selection was carried out by a committee composed of Jacqueline Govaert, Jaap Reesema, Carolien Borgers, Hila Noorzai, Cornald Maas, Sander Lantinga and chairman Twan van de Nieuwenhuijzen. By the end of October 2023, all the submissions had been assessed and were in the process of being narrowed down to a shortlist, which by mid-November was reported to be of ten artists. Five of these, namely Karsu, Joost Klein, Ilse DeLange, Numidia, and Sophia Kruithof, were then selected for a final round that took place on 28 November, where they performed their submission live in front of the committee, before the final decision was made. Klein was announced on 11 December as the selected entrant, with his song "Europapa", written jointly with rapper Donnie, released on 29 February 2024 upon its premiere during a special live broadcast of De Avondshow met Arjen Lubach on NPO 1. Klein and Donnie had announced their candidacy in August 2023. Additional songwriters were revealed upon the song's release: Dylan van Dael, Paul Elstak, Teun de Kruif, Thijmen Melissant, and Tim Haars.

=== Promotion ===
As part of the promotion of his participation in the contest, Klein attended the Eurovision in Concert pre-party event in Amsterdam on 13 April 2024 and the Nordic Eurovision Party in Stockholm on 14 April 2024. He gave the first public performance of "Europapa" at 013 in Tilburg on 14 March 2024.

== At Eurovision ==
The Eurovision Song Contest 2024 took place at the Malmö Arena in Malmö, Sweden, and consisted of two semi-finals held on the respective dates of 7 and 9 May and the final on 11 May 2024. All nations with the exceptions of the host country and the "Big Five" (France, Germany, Italy, Spain and the United Kingdom) were required to qualify from one of two semi-finals in order to compete in the final; the top ten countries from each semi-final progress to the final. On 30 January 2024, an allocation draw was held to determine which of the two semi-finals, as well as which half of the show, each country would perform in; the European Broadcasting Union (EBU) split up the competing countries into different pots based on voting patterns from previous contests, with countries with favourable voting histories put into the same pot. The Netherlands was scheduled for the second half of the second semi-final. The shows' producers then decided the running order for the semi-finals; the Netherlands was set to close the show in position 16.

In the Netherlands, all the shows were broadcast on NPO 1, with commentary provided by Cornald Maas and Jacqueline Govaert, and the final on NPO Radio 2, with commentary by Carolien Borgers. NPO also broadcast the contest internationally on BVN. In addition, as part of the Eurovision programming, Dutch broadcaster NTR cooperated with DR and SVT alongside other EBU member broadcasters – namely ARD/WDR, the BBC, ČT, ERR, France Télévisions, NRK, RÚV, VRT and Yle – to produce and air a documentary titled ABBA – Against the Odds, on the occasion of the 50th anniversary of Sweden's first victory at the contest with "Waterloo" by ABBA.

A public event was held on the day of the final at the Oldehoofsterkerkhof in Joost Klein's birth city of Leeuwarden, featuring a live screening of the show. Organisers obtained permission from AVROTROS to have the Oldehove Tower as the venue for the planned live announcement of the Dutch jury points, traditionally given from the broadcaster's studios in Hilversum.

=== Performance ===
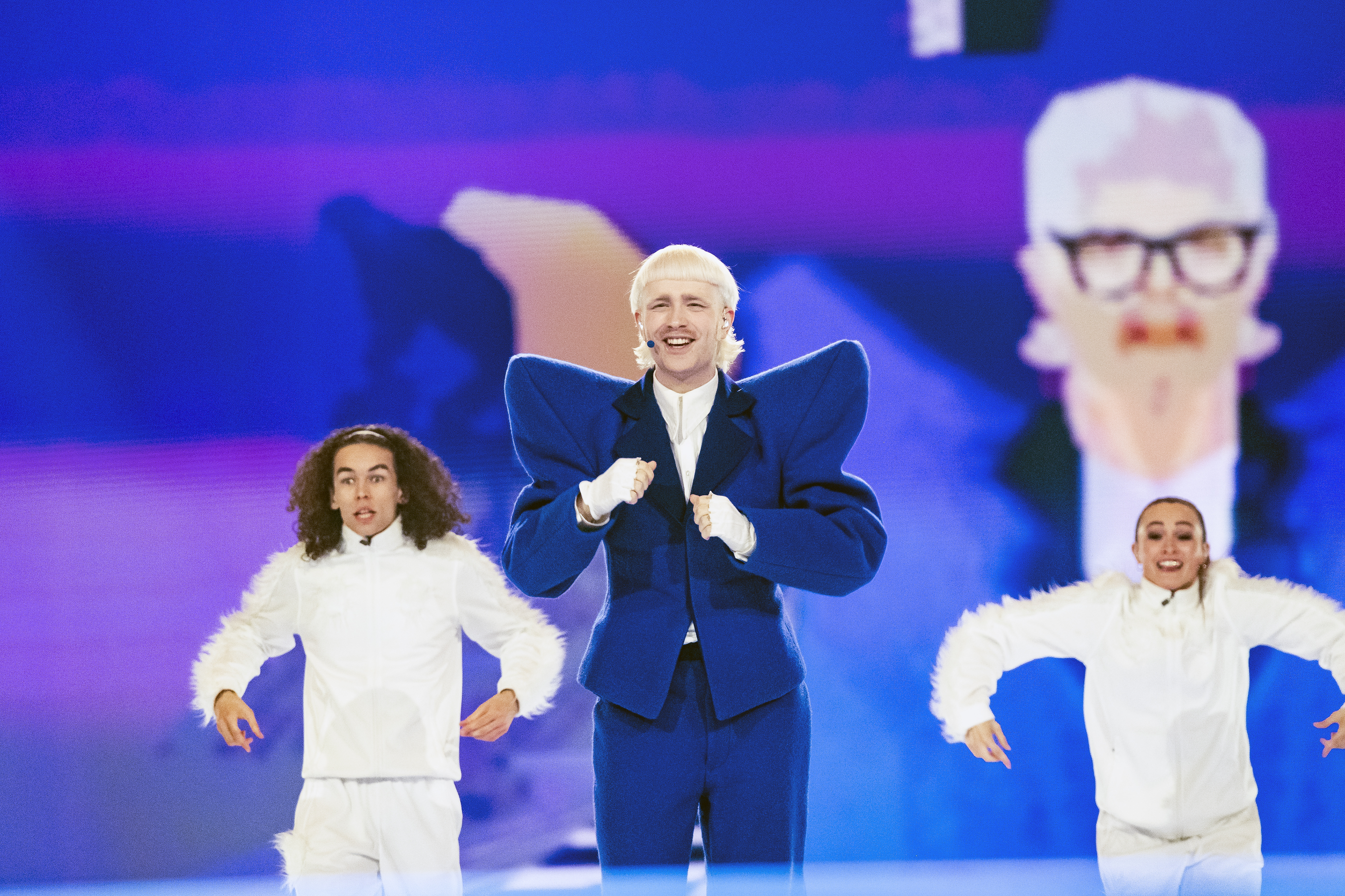
Joost Klein during a rehearsal before the second semi-final

Joost Klein took part in technical rehearsals on 30 April and 3 May, followed by dress rehearsals on 8 and 9 May. The staging of his performance of "Europapa" at the contest is directed by Gover Meit, and sees the additional presence of TikTokers Appie Mussa and Stuntkabouter as keyboardists – with Mussa dressed as a blue and yellow bird with a tie featuring the flag of the European Union – and two supporting dancers.

=== Semi-final ===
The Netherlands performed last, in position 16, following the entry from Norway. At the end of the show, the country was announced as a qualifier for the final. It was later revealed that it had placed 2nd out of 16 countries in the semi-final, receiving 182 points.

Following the semi-final, the Netherlands drew "producer's choice" for the final, meaning that the country would perform in the half decided by the contest's producers. The Netherlands was set to perform in position 5, following the entry from Luxembourg and before the entry from Israel.

=== Incident and subsequent disqualification ===
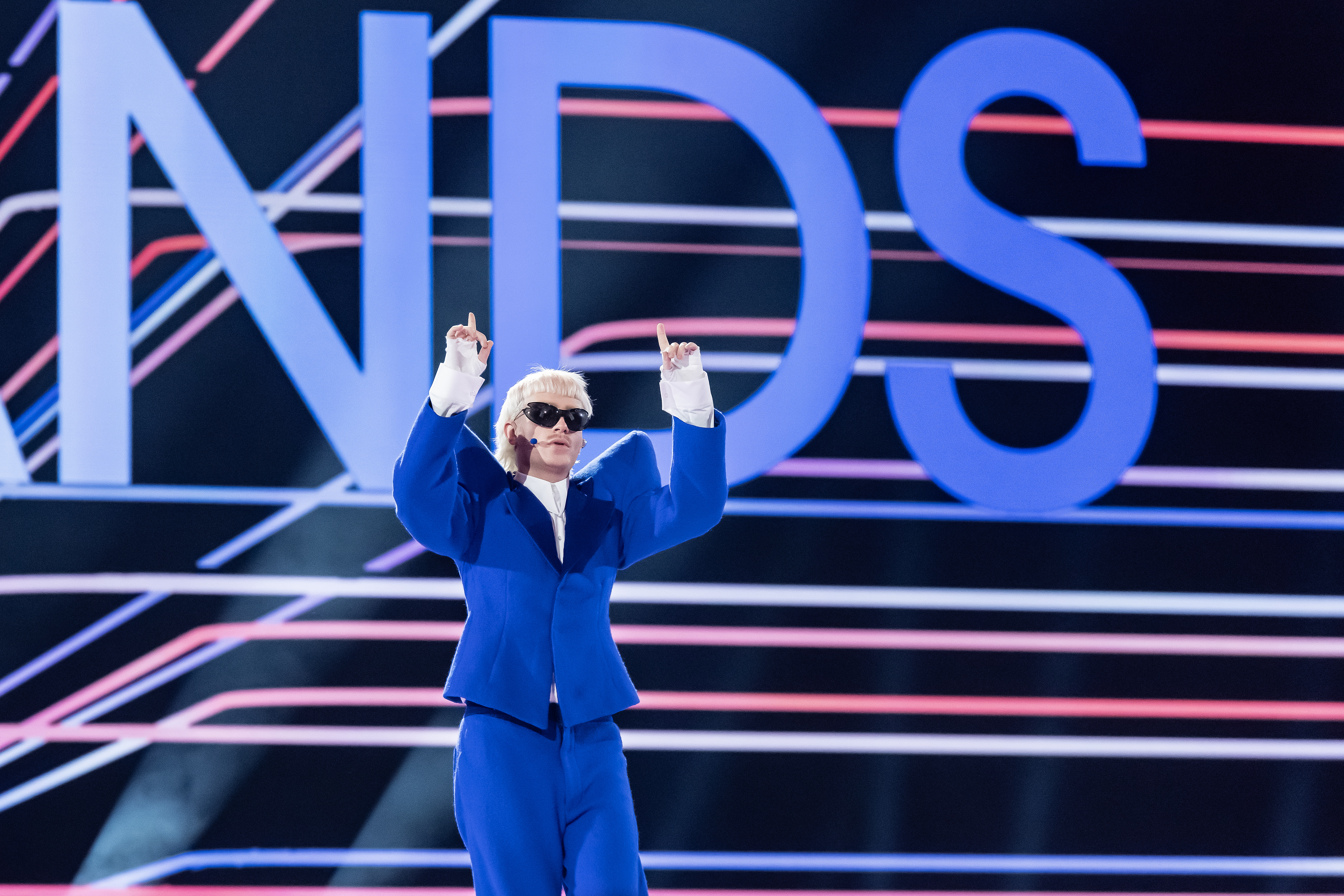
Joost Klein at the flag parade during the first dress rehearsal for the final; he was not seen again during the show afterwards.

During the first dress rehearsal of the final on 10 May, Klein did not appear for his performance despite being present during the flag parade. The EBU stated in a press release that it was "investigating an incident reported to [it] involving the Dutch artist", as well as that "he [would] not be rehearsing until further notice". He was also not present for the jury show, and a recording of his performance from the second semi-final was used there instead. AVROTROS and NPO held discussions with the EBU, after which it was announced that Klein had been disqualified from the final and investigated by the police for allegedly making a "threatening movement" towards a female employee of the production team, who was holding a camera after he had repeatedly indicated his desire not to be filmed "against clearly made agreements".

On 11 May, three and a half hours before the final, AVROTROS published a statement addressing the disqualification, in which it called the penalty "very heavy and disproportionate". The broadcaster also opted not to present the points of the Dutch jury on air, as it is no longer part of the final:

An incident occurred after last Thursday's performance. Against clearly made agreements, Joost was filmed when he had just gotten off stage and had to rush to the greenroom. At that moment, Joost repeatedly indicated that he did not want to be filmed. This wasn't respected. This led to a threatening movement from Joost towards the camera. Joost did not touch the camera woman. This incident was reported, followed by an investigation by the EBU and police.
Yesterday and today we consulted extensively with the EBU and proposed several solutions. Nevertheless, the EBU has still decided to disqualify Joost Klein. AVROTROS finds the penalty very heavy and disproportionate. We stand for good manners – let there be no misunderstanding about that – but in our view, an exclusion order is not proportional to this incident.
We are very disappointed and upset for the millions of fans who were so excited for tonight. What Joost brought to the Netherlands and Europe shouldn't have ended this way.
Now that AVROTROS is no longer part of the Grand Final of the Eurovision Song Contest, we do not feel the need to hand out the points of the Dutch jury. In consultation with Nikkie de Jager, who would act as our spokesperson tonight, we decided not to do it. Just like Nikkie, we imagined this evening very differently.

In response to the disqualification, Appie Mussa, part of the Dutch stage act, released a TikTok video that criticised the EBU's decision. In it, he claimed that Klein did "almost nothing" and the EBU opted to disqualify him because his song was getting "too big". Cornald Maas, AVROTROS' television commentator for the Eurovision Song Contest and member of its Dutch selection committee, called the punishment "cruel and unusual" and later added, "fuck the EBU". Ivan Simonović, a member of Serbia's delegation, called the disqualification "unfair", while RTVSLO, Slovenia's broadcaster, requested clarifications from the EBU. Portugal, Croatia, France, Norway and Spain also requested explanations from the EBU regarding incidents that occurred during the contest. The Swedish Police Authority launched an investigation into the incident on the day it was reported, and the case was subsequently handed to the Swedish Prosecution Authority. The investigation was closed on 12 August, with the senior prosecutor Fredrik Jönsson citing a lack of evidence to prove that Klein "was capable of causing serious fear or that [he] had any such intention". AVROTROS subsequently requested a meeting on "very short notice" with the EBU to discuss the disqualification, and stated that its participation in the 2025 contest would depend on "structural adjustments" to the organisation of the event.

=== Voting ===
Below is a breakdown of points awarded to and by the Netherlands in the second semi-final and in the final. Voting during the three shows involved each country awarding sets of points from 1-8, 10 and 12: one from their professional jury and the other from televoting in the final vote, while the semi-final vote was based entirely on the vote of the public. The Dutch jury consisted of Sera de Bruin, Rob Ester, Glen Faria, Shayveca Kreuger, and Raymond van Vliet. In the second semi-final, the Netherlands placed second with 182 points. Over the course of the contest, the Netherlands awarded its 12 points to Israel in the second semi-final, and to Switzerland (jury) and Israel (televote) in the final.

AVROTROS initially appointed Nikkie de Jager, who had previously co-hosted the 2021 contest, as its spokesperson to announce the Dutch jury's votes in the final. De Jager later withdrew from her role due to the disqualification, (Note: An investigation by Dutch newspaper Het Parool, published in December 2024, claimed that AVROTROS chose to withdraw De Jager as spokesperson in protest of the disqualification, instead of De Jager herself doing so.) and AVROTROS opted not to replace her with a different spokesperson. The contest's executive supervisor, Martin Österdahl, announced the points from the Dutch jury instead.

==== Points awarded to the Netherlands ====
Points awarded to the Netherlands (Semi-final 2)
Score	Televote
12 points	Austria; Belgium; Greece; Malta
10 points	Albania; Czechia; Denmark; Estonia; Italy; Rest of the World; San Marino (Note: San Marino uses a jury in the semi-finals.); Switzerland
8 points	Armenia; Georgia; Latvia; Norway; Spain
7 points	France; Israel
6 points	
5 points	
4 points	
3 points	
2 points	
1 point	

==== Points awarded by the Netherlands ====
Points awarded by the Netherlands (Semi-final 2)
Score	Televote
12 points	Israel
10 points	Armenia
8 points	Switzerland
7 points	Estonia
6 points	Greece
5 points	Belgium
4 points	Norway
3 points	Latvia
2 points	Austria
1 point	Czechia

Points awarded by the Netherlands (Final)
Score	Televote	Jury
12 points	Israel	Switzerland
10 points	Croatia	France
8 points	Ukraine	Portugal
7 points	Switzerland	Croatia
6 points	Ireland	Italy
5 points	France	Germany
4 points	Greece	Lithuania
3 points	Armenia	Armenia
2 points	Italy	Ukraine
1 point	Lithuania	Latvia

==== Detailed voting results ====
Each participating broadcaster assembles a five-member jury panel consisting of music industry professionals who are citizens of the country they represent. Each jury, and individual jury member, is required to meet a strict set of criteria regarding professional background, as well as diversity in gender and age. No member of a national jury was permitted to be related in any way to any of the competing acts in such a way that they cannot vote impartially and independently. The individual rankings of each jury member as well as the nation's televoting results were released shortly after the grand final.

The following members comprised the Dutch jury:

- Sera de Bruin
- Rob Ester
- Glen Walter Faria
- Shayveca Kreuger
- Raymond van Vliet

Detailed voting results from the Netherlands (Semi-final 2)
R/O	Country	Televote	
R/O	Country	Rank	Points
01	Malta	13	
02	Albania	15	
03	Greece	5	6
04	Switzerland	3	8
05	Czechia	10	1
06	Austria	9	2
07	Denmark	11	
08	Armenia	2	10
09	Latvia	8	3
10	San Marino	14	
11	Georgia	12	
12	Belgium	6	5
13	Estonia	4	7
14	Israel	1	12
15	Norway	7	4
16	Netherlands		

Detailed voting results from the Netherlands (Final)
R/O	Country	Jury							Televote	
R/O	Country	Juror A	Juror B	Juror C	Juror D	Juror E	Rank	Points	Rank	Points
01	Sweden	8	5	18	16	21	12		19	
02	Ukraine	6	6	6	17	15	9	2	3	8
03	Germany	19	7	17	4	4	6	5	18	
04	Luxembourg	20	8	16	6	16	14		20	
~~05~~	~~Netherlands~~ ‡ (Note: The Netherlands was disqualified prior to the final.)									
06	Israel	17	12	14	9	17	18		1	12
07	Lithuania	9	11	15	5	5	7	4	10	1
08	Spain	16	18	5	8	18	11		15	
09	Estonia	24	24	3	19	22	15		14	
10	Ireland	11	17	24	25	6	17		5	6
11	Latvia	23	9	12	7	8	10	1	11	
12	Greece	5	16	19	21	13	16		7	4
13	United Kingdom	15	19	25	22	14	25		23	
14	Norway	13	25	20	13	23	24		12	
15	Italy	3	4	13	14	9	5	6	9	2
16	Serbia	25	22	23	20	7	21		22	
17	Finland	18	15	10	18	25	22		13	
18	Portugal	12	20	21	1	3	3	8	17	
19	Armenia	10	3	11	11	10	8	3	8	3
20	Cyprus	14	23	8	23	19	20		21	
21	Switzerland	1	1	4	2	1	1	12	4	7
22	Slovenia	22	21	22	12	11	23		25	
23	Croatia	4	13	2	10	12	4	7	2	10
24	Georgia	21	14	9	15	20	19		24	
25	France	2	2	1	3	2	2	10	6	5
26	Austria	7	10	7	24	24	13		16	
