= Switzerland in the Eurovision Song Contest 2024 =

- Eurovision Song Contest 2024
- Participating broadcaster: Swiss Broadcasting Corporation (SRG SSR)
- Country: Switzerland
- Selection process: Internal selection
- Announcement date: 29 February 2024

Competing entry
- Song: "The Code"
- Artist: Nemo
- Songwriters: Benjamin Alasu; Lasse Midtsian Nymann; Linda Dale; Nemo Mettler

Placement
- Semi-final result: Qualified (4th, 132 points)
- Final result: 1st, 591 points

Participation chronology

Switzerland was represented at the Eurovision Song Contest 2024 with the song "The Code", written by Benjamin Alasu, Lasse Midtsian Nymann, Linda Dale, and Nemo Mettler, and performed by Nemo themself. The Swiss participating broadcaster, the Swiss Broadcasting Corporation (SRG SSR), internally selected its entry, which ultimately won the contest.

== Background ==
Prior to the 2024 contest, the Swiss Broadcasting Corporation (SRG SSR) had participated in the Eurovision Song Contest representing Switzerland sixty-three times since its first entry at the inaugural contest in 1956. It won that first edition of the contest with the song "Refrain" performed by Lys Assia. Its second victory was achieved in 1988 with the song "Ne partez pas sans moi" performed by Canadian singer Céline Dion. Following the introduction of semi-finals for the 2004, it had managed to participate in the final nine times, four of them being all the contests it participated in since 2019, which included two top five results. In 2023, "Watergun" performed by Remo Forrer qualified for the final and finished 20th.

As part of its duties as participating broadcaster, SRG SSR organises the selection of its entry in the Eurovision Song Contest and broadcasts the event in the country. The broadcaster had opted for both national finals and internal selections to select its entries throughout the years, sticking to the internal selection method since 2019. SRG SSR confirmed its intention to participate at the 2024 contest on 7 July 2023, later announcing that it would again use an internal selection to determine its entry.

== Before Eurovision ==
=== SUISA songwriting camp ===
Between 30 May and 1 June 2023, the annual SUISA songwriting camp took place in Maur, Zürich; the songs composed in the event are usually submitted to SRG SSR as potential Eurovision entries. Participants in the camp included Teya (one of the 2023 representatives for Austria), Elsie Bay (a three-time entrant to the Norwegian national final Melodi Grand Prix, once as a songwriter) and Linda Dale (one of the songwriters of "Queen of Kings", the Norwegian entry in 2023). Dale would later emerge as one of the authors of the selected entry.

=== Internal selection ===
SRG SSR opened a submission period between 10 and 24 August 2023 for interested artists and composers to submit their entries. Artists and songwriters of any nationality were able to submit songs, with priority given to Swiss nationals or residents. At the closing of the window, nearly 420 entries had been submitted. Submissions were assessed in various rounds by a Swiss public panel, an international public panel, and a 25-member international expert jury; the public panels consisted of Swiss and international audience members, while the international jury consisted of former national jurors for their respective countries at the Eurovision Song Contest. The last round was held before 5 December 2023, when the five contendants left in the running recorded their songs at the SRF studios in Zürich. The panels then proceeded to select the Swiss entry from these studio versions.

The announcement of the artist and the release of the song took place on 29 February 2024, with Nemo, as several independent sources had unofficially confirmed to Blick a few days earlier, and the song "The Code"; Swiss Head of Delegation Yves Schifferle had anticipated that the entry would differ from the country's recent contributions to the contest (2020, 2021, 2022 and 2023) for not being "a male ballad".

=== Promotion ===
As part of the promotion of their participation in the contest, Nemo attended the PrePartyES in Madrid on 30 March 2024, the Eurovision in Concert event in Amsterdam on 13 April 2024 and the Nordic Eurovision Party in Stockholm on 14 April 2024. On 8 April 2024, Nemo was a guest on HRT Radio in Croatia, and shortly after, they performed at the Swedish embassy in Bern.

== At Eurovision ==
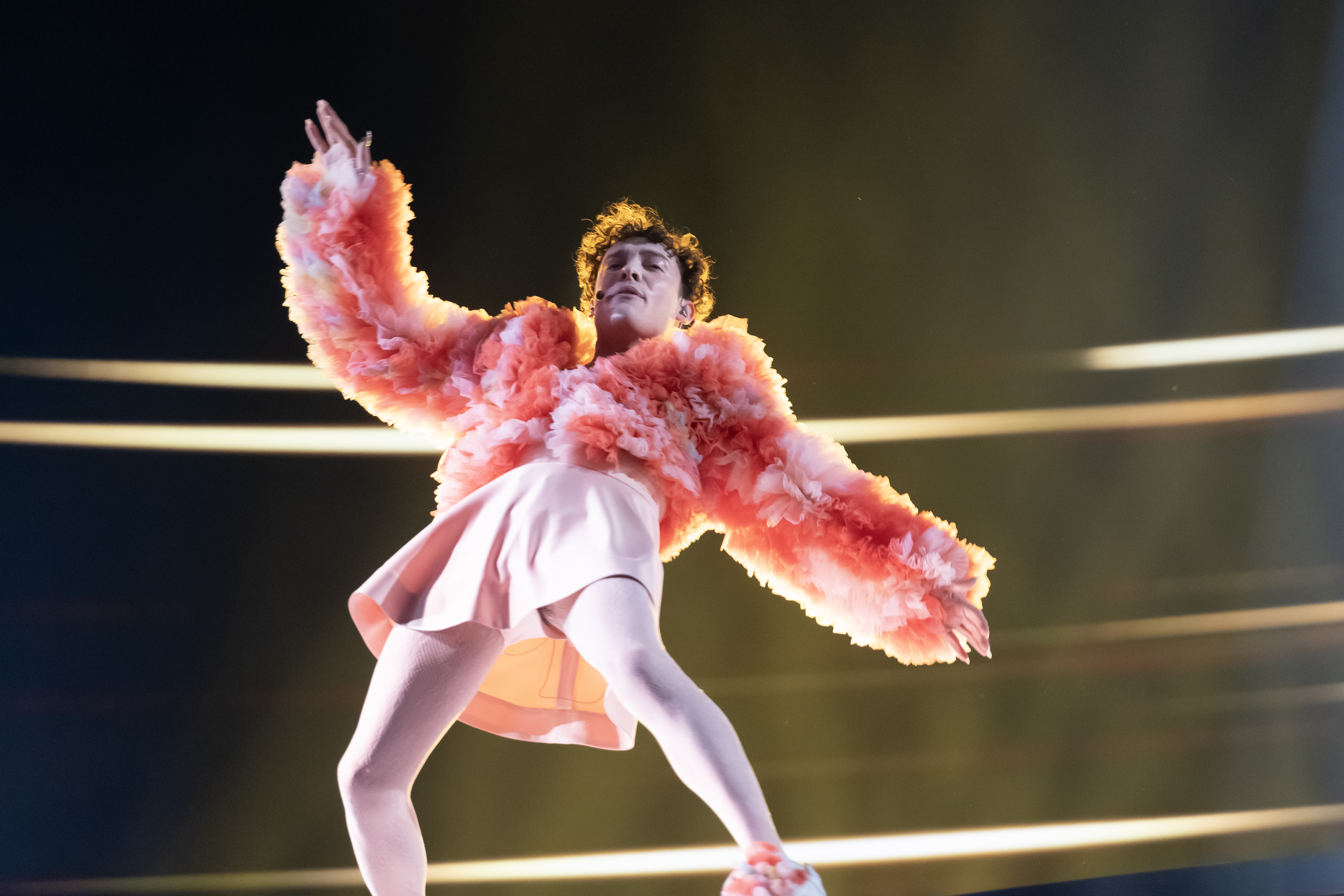
Nemo during a rehearsal before the second semi-final.

The Eurovision Song Contest 2024 took place at the Malmö Arena in Malmö, Sweden, and consisted of two semi-finals held on the respective dates of 7 and 9 May and the final on 11 May 2024. All nations with the exceptions of the host country and the "Big Five" (France, Germany, Italy, Spain and the United Kingdom) were required to qualify from one of two semi-finals in order to compete in the final; the top ten countries from each semi-final progress to the final. On 30 January 2024, an allocation draw was held to determine which of the two semi-finals, as well as which half of the show, each country would perform in; the European Broadcasting Union (EBU) split up the competing countries into different pots based on voting patterns from previous contests, with countries with favourable voting histories put into the same pot. Switzerland was scheduled for the first half of the second semi-final. The shows' producers then decided the running order for the semi-finals; Switzerland was set to perform in position 4.

SRG SSR aired the contest through its subsidiaries across the country:

- French-speaking RTS broadcast the semi-finals on RTS 2 and the final on RTS 1, all with commentary by Jean-Marc Richard, and Nicolas Tanner, with Julie Berthollet joining them for the final;
- German-speaking SRF broadcast the semi-finals on SRF zwei and the final on SRF 1, all with commentary by Sven Epiney; additionally, in a joint meeting held in Munich in September 2023, SRF renewed its plans with German broadcaster ARD and Austrian broadcaster ORF to cooperate on the broadcast of Eurovision-themed programmes ESC – Der Countdown and ESC – Die Aftershow in 2024, as they did for the 2023 contest; the shows are hosted by Barbara Schöneberger;
- Italian-speaking RSI broadcast the semi-finals on RSI La 2 and the final on RSI La 1, all with commentary by Ellis Cavallini and Gian-Andrea Costa.

=== Performance ===
Nemo took part in technical rehearsals on 29 April and 2 May, followed by dress rehearsals on 8 and 9 May. The staging of their performance of "The Code" at the contest is directed by Fredrik Rydman (who has previously done so for a number of entries, most notably Sweden in 2015 and Finland in 2023) and features Nemo performing on a rotating platform.

=== Semi-final ===
Switzerland performed in position 4, following the entry from Greece and before the entry from Czechia. At the end of the show, the country was announced as a qualifier for the final.

=== Final ===
Following the semi-final, Switzerland drew "producer's choice" for the final, meaning that the country performed in the half decided by the contest's producers. Switzerland performed in position 21, following the entry from Cyprus and before the entry from Slovenia.

=== Voting ===
Below is a breakdown of points awarded to and by Switzerland in the second semi-final and in the final. Voting during the three shows involved each country awarding sets of points from 1-8, 10 and 12: one from their professional jury and the other from televoting in the final vote, while the semi-final vote was based entirely on the vote of the public. The Swiss jury consisted of Jamila Awad, Tobias Carshey, Laurence Desarzens, Kety Fusco, and Raphael Haldemann. In the second semi-final, Switzerland placed fourth with 132 points, receiving maximum twelve points from San Marino, and securing the country its fifth consecutive qualification to the final. In the final, Switzerland was declared the winner with a total of 591 points, receiving twelve points in the jury vote from twenty-two of the thirty-six eligible countries, and in the televote from Ukraine. Over the course of the contest, Switzerland awarded its 12 points to Israel in the second semi-final, and to Greece (jury) and Israel (televote) in the final.

SRG SSR appointed Jennifer Bosshard as its spokesperson to announce the Swiss jury's votes in the final.

==== Points awarded to Switzerland ====
Points awarded to Switzerland (Semi-final 2)
Score	Televote
12 points	San Marino (Note: San Marino uses a jury in the semi-finals.)
10 points	
8 points	Austria; Czechia; France; Italy; Malta; Netherlands
7 points	Armenia; Belgium; Estonia; Greece; Latvia; Norway
6 points	Denmark; Rest of the World
5 points	Albania; Georgia
4 points	Israel; Spain
3 points	
2 points	
1 point	

Points awarded to Switzerland (Final)
Score	Televote	Jury
12 points	Ukraine	Albania; Austria; Azerbaijan; Denmark; Estonia; Finland; Georgia; Greece; Ireland; Italy; Latvia; Lithuania; Luxembourg; Malta; Netherlands; Norway; Poland; Portugal; San Marino; Spain; Sweden; Ukraine
10 points	Azerbaijan	Australia; Belgium; Czechia; Serbia; Slovenia; United Kingdom
8 points	Armenia; Austria; Finland; Greece; Lithuania; Poland	
7 points	Australia; Czechia; Estonia; Georgia; Germany; Italy; Netherlands; Sweden	Armenia; Moldova
6 points	Belgium; Cyprus; France; Iceland; Ireland; Malta; Norway; Portugal; Rest of the World; Serbia; Spain	Cyprus; Iceland
5 points	Denmark; Moldova; San Marino; United Kingdom	France; Germany; Israel
4 points	Latvia; Slovenia	
3 points	Albania	
2 points	Luxembourg	
1 point	Croatia	

==== Points awarded by Switzerland ====
Points awarded by Switzerland (Semi-final 2)
Score	Televote
12 points	Israel
10 points	Netherlands
8 points	Greece
7 points	Latvia
6 points	Armenia
5 points	Estonia
4 points	Austria
3 points	Albania
2 points	Denmark
1 point	Norway

Points awarded by Switzerland (Final)
Score	Televote	Jury
12 points	Israel	Greece
10 points	Croatia	Ireland
8 points	Italy	Croatia
7 points	France	Portugal
6 points	Ukraine	Italy
5 points	Serbia	France
4 points	Greece	Armenia
3 points	Germany	United Kingdom
2 points	Portugal	Ukraine
1 point	Armenia	Spain

==== Detailed voting results ====
Each participating broadcaster assembles a five-member jury panel consisting of music industry professionals who are citizens of the country they represent. Each jury, and individual jury member, is required to meet a strict set of criteria regarding professional background, as well as diversity in gender and age. No member of a national jury was permitted to be related in any way to any of the competing acts in such a way that they cannot vote impartially and independently. The individual rankings of each jury member as well as the nation's televoting results were released shortly after the grand final.

The following members comprised the Swiss jury:

- Jamila Awad
- Tobias Carshey
- Laurence Desarzens
- Kety Fusco
- Raphael Haldemann

Detailed voting results from Switzerland (Semi-final 2)
R/O	Country	Televote	
R/O	Country	Rank	Points
01	Malta	14	
02	Albania	8	3
03	Greece	3	8
04	Switzerland		
05	Czechia	11	
06	Austria	7	4
07	Denmark	9	2
08	Armenia	5	6
09	Latvia	4	7
10	San Marino	15	
11	Georgia	13	
12	Belgium	12	
13	Estonia	6	5
14	Israel	1	12
15	Norway	10	1
16	Netherlands	2	10

Detailed voting results from Switzerland (Final)
R/O	Country	Jury							Televote	
R/O	Country	Juror 1	Juror 2	Juror 3	Juror 4	Juror 5	Rank	Points	Rank	Points
01	Sweden	8	23	12	19	12	19		19	
02	Ukraine	12	9	4	16	9	10	2	5	6
03	Germany	17	20	24	4	14	14		8	3
04	Luxembourg	23	12	19	23	7	20		17	
~~05~~	~~Netherlands~~ ‡ (Note: The Netherlands was disqualified prior to the final.)	~~1~~	~~22~~	~~5~~	~~22~~	~~18~~	~~8~~		N/A	
06	Israel	25	21	25	8	13	22		1	12
07	Lithuania	15	24	6	21	15	18		15	
08	Spain	19	1	23	25	23	11	1	13	
09	Estonia	14	4	15	18	22	13		18	
10	Ireland	3	3	7	9	1	2	10	11	
11	Latvia	21	17	16	20	21	25		14	
12	Greece	4	2	1	10	5	1	12	7	4
13	United Kingdom	9	5	13	14	6	9	3	22	
14	Norway	18	6	14	11	17	15		21	
15	Italy	7	7	8	5	4	5	6	3	8
16	Serbia	11	11	11	12	16	17		6	5
17	Finland	6	19	20	24	25	21		16	
18	Portugal	16	18	2	7	2	4	7	9	2
19	Armenia	5	10	3	17	8	7	4	10	1
20	Cyprus	20	16	21	2	20	12		20	
21	Switzerland									
22	Slovenia	22	13	18	13	19	23		24	
23	Croatia	2	14	10	3	3	3	8	2	10
24	Georgia	13	25	22	6	10	16		23	
25	France	10	8	9	1	11	6	5	4	7
26	Austria	24	15	17	15	24	24		12	
