= Luxembourg in the Eurovision Song Contest 2024 =

- Eurovision Song Contest 2024
- Participating broadcaster: RTL Lëtzebuerg (RTL)
- Country: Luxembourg
- Selection process: Luxembourg Song Contest
- Selection date: 27 January 2024

Competing entry
- Song: "Fighter"
- Artist: Tali
- Songwriters: Ana Zimmer; Dario Faini; Manon Romiti; Silvio Lisbonne

Placement
- Semi-final result: Qualified (5th, 117 points)
- Final result: 13th, 103 points

Participation chronology

Luxembourg was represented at the Eurovision Song Contest 2024 with the song "Fighter", written by Ana Zimmer, Dario Faini, Manon Romiti, and Silvio Lisbonne, and performed by Tali. The Luxembourgish participating broadcaster, RTL Lëtzebuerg (RTL), organised the national final Luxembourg Song Contest in order to select its entry for the contest. This was the return of Luxembourg to the contest after an absence of 31 years since its last participation in 1993.

Luxembourg was drawn to compete in the first semi-final of the Eurovision Song Contest which took place on 7 May 2024 and was later selected to perform in position 15. At the end of the show, "Fighter" was announced among the top 10 entries of the first semi-final and hence qualified to compete in the final. It was later revealed that Luxembourg placed fifth out of the fifteen participating countries in the semi-final with 117 points. In the final, Luxembourg performed in position 4 and placed thirteenth out of the 25 performing countries, scoring a total of 103 points.

== Background ==
Prior to the 2024 contest, the Compagnie Luxembourgeoise de Télédiffusion (CLT) had participated in the Eurovision Song Contest representing Luxembourg thirty-seven times since debuting in its first edition of 1956. It had won the contest on five occasions: in 1961 with "Nous les amoureux" performed by Jean-Claude Pascal, in 1965 with "Poupée de cire, poupée de son" performed by France Gall, in 1972 with "Après toi" performed by Vicky Leandros, in 1973 with "Tu te reconnaîtras" performed by Anne-Marie David, and finally in 1983 with "Si la vie est cadeau" performed by Corinne Hermès. After a poor result in 1993, CLT was relegated from the 1994 contest in accordance with the rules in place at the time, and had since opted to be absent from the event.

On 15 December 2022, it was revealed that the Luxembourgish prime minister Xavier Bettel had instigated discussions regarding the return of the country to the Eurovision Song Contest in 2024, with a team later created by the Luxembourgish government dedicated to ensuring the country's return to the contest. On 12 May 2023, Luxembourgish broadcaster RTL Lëtzebuerg (RTL) and the European Broadcasting Union (EBU) officially revealed that Luxembourg would return to the contest in 2024, marking the first Luxembourgish participation in over 30 years. CEO of RTL Christophe Goossens stated the broadcaster was "delighted" to return to the Eurovision Song Contest and to select the 2024 Luxembourgish delegation. On 3 July 2023, RTL announced that its entry for the 2024 contest would be selected through a televised final.

== Before Eurovision ==
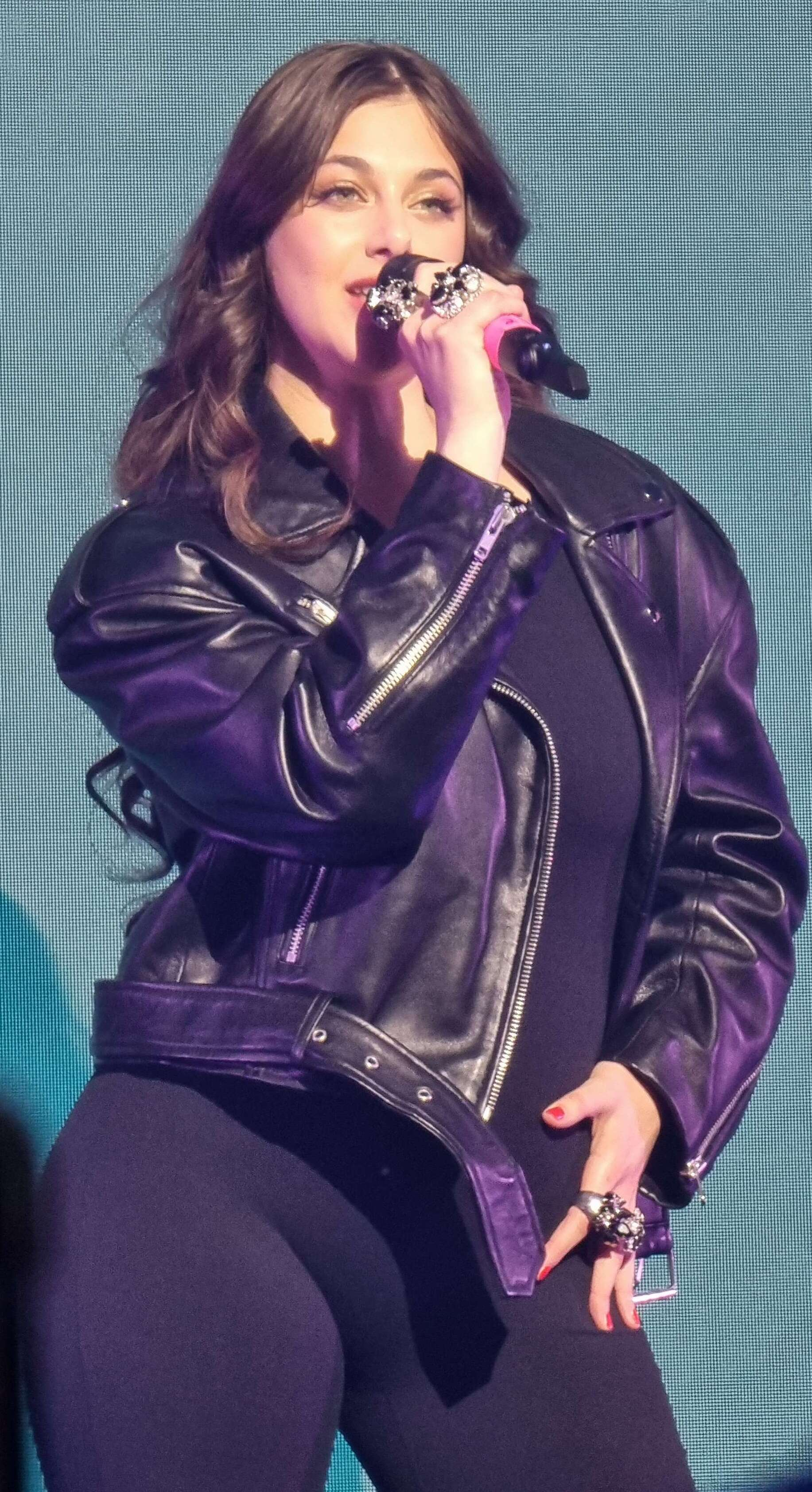
Tali, winner of Luxembourg Song Contest

=== Luxembourg Song Contest ===
Luxembourg Song Contest was the competition that selected Luxembourg's entry for the Eurovision Song Contest 2024. The competition featured eight acts and took place on 27 January 2024 at the Rockhal in Esch-sur-Alzette, hosted by Désirée Nosbusch who had previously presented the 1984 edition of the Eurovision Song Contest held in Luxembourg City, Melody Funck, Raoul Roos and Loïc Juchem. The show was broadcast on RTL Télé Lëtzebuerg, RTL Radio Lëtzebuerg, Today Radio as well as streamed online on RTL Infos, RTL Play and the broadcaster's website rtl.lu (with the original audio). Melissa Dalton and Sarah Tapp provided English-language commentary on Today Radio, while Jérôme Didelot and Violetta Caldarelli provided French-language commentary on RTL Infos and RTL Play.

==== Competing entries ====
On 3 July 2023, RTL opened a submission period for interested artists and songwriters to submit their applications in one or more of three categories: the first for performers with a song, the second for performers without a song and the third for songwriters. Artists were required to have Luxembourg nationality, have lived in Luxembourg for three consecutive years, or have a strong link with the Luxembourg cultural and music scene, and were able to submit up to three entries each. Songwriters could be of any nationality. Applicants of the second category were also required to be non-professional singers and had to submit an introduction video containing a performance of a song of their choice until 16 July 2023. The application deadline for the third category concluded in mid-August 2023, while the application deadline for the first category concluded on 1 October 2023.

Auditions featuring around 100 performers that applied for the second category took place in late July 2023 at the Rockhal in Esch-sur-Alzette. A jury panel consisting of Sandra Bintz (Head of rtl.lu), Jenny Fischbach (RTL Head of Culture), Eric Lehmann (Head of the Luxembourgish Eurovision Delegation), Jules Serrig (audio expert), Dave Gloesener (RTL Head of Radio) and Samuel Steen (radio personality) selected several of the performers to collaborate with songwriters that applied for the third category on their songs for the competition. A total of 459 entries were received by the end of the deadline of the first category, from which 70 were shortlisted by RTL. A final audition round took place between 22 and 24 November 2023 at the Rockhal where an international jury panel evaluated the shortlisted songs. Eight finalists were selected, with the performers having the possibility of directly choosing a song of their choice from the other received submissions. The international jury panel consisted of Tali Eshkoli (Israeli television producer), Christer Björkman (Swedish television producer and presenter, represented Sweden at Eurovision in 1992), Jan Bors (creative content producer for Czech Television), Cesár Sampson (who represented Austria at Eurovision in 2018) and Alex Panayi (jury chairman, represented Cyprus at Eurovision in 1995 and in 2000).

The eight participating acts were announced on 11 December 2023 on Today Radio, while their songs were released on 9 January 2024. Some of the artists had previously taken part in other talent shows: The Voice of Germany (Krick in season 7 and Joel Marques Cunha in season 13), Naomi Ayé in The Voice Kids France, Angy in The Voice Belgique, and Rafa Ela in Luxembourg's Next Popstar and Top Voice Luxembourg. Prior to the final, the competing artists worked with vocal coaches Francesca Aaen and Susanne Georgi (represented Andorra at Eurovision in 2009) to prepare for their live performances.

Artist	Song	Songwriter(s)
Angy and Rafa Ela	"Drop"	Angy Sciacqua; Martin Kleveland; Siv Marit Egsith
Chaild	"Hold On"	Jimmy Jansson; Peter Boström; Thomas G:son
Edsun	"Finally Alive"	Edson Pires Domingos; Jana Bahrich; Sergio Manique Jr.
Joel Marques Cunha	"Believer"	Brice Lebel; Clément Mouillard; Marvin Dupré
Krick	"Drowning in the Rain"	Andreas Stone Johansson; Elsa Søllesvik; Tom Oehler
Naomi Ayé	"Paumée sur terre"	Eddy Pradelles; Manon Romiti; Silvio Lisbonne
One Last Time	"Devil in the Detail"	Albin Fredy Ljungqvist; Bruce R. F. Smith; Jonas Holteberg Jensen
Tali	"Fighter"	Ana Zimmer; Dario Faini; Manon Romiti; Silvio Lisbonne

==== Final ====
The televised final took place on 27 January 2024. The winner was selected through two rounds of voting. In the first round of voting, the top three entries were selected to proceed to the second round, the superfinal, through the 50/50 combination of votes from eight international jury groups and public online voting on the RTL website, which also accepted votes worldwide. In the superfinal, the jury and public vote selected "Fighter" performed by Tali as the winner. The viewers and the juries each awarded a total of 336 points in the first round and 240 points in the superfinal, with each jury group distributing 2, 4, 6, 8, 10 and 12 points in the first round and 8, 10 and 12 points in the superfinal. The viewer vote was awarded proportionally, based on the percentage of votes each song achieved. For example, if a song gained 10% of the viewer vote in the first round, then that entry would be awarded 10% of 336 points rounded to the nearest integer: 34 points. Due to the rounding of the total votes received, the total votes awarded by the viewers were ultimately one less than that awarded by the juries. Public votes were received from viewers in 60 countries, with over 76% of the votes coming from Luxembourg.

In addition to the performances of the competing entries, Vicky Leandros and Anne-Marie David (1972 and 1973 Eurovision winners for Luxembourg) opened the show with excerpts from their respective winning songs "Après toi" and "Tu te reconnaîtras", followed by all eight finalists performing a rendition of "Poupée de cire, poupée de son" by France Gall (1965 winning entry for Luxembourg). The interval act during the show included performances from Schëppe Siwen as well as former Eurovision winners Katrina Leskanich (in 1997 for the United Kingdom as part of Katrina and the Waves), Charlotte Perrelli (in 1999 for Sweden), Ruslana (in 2004 for Ukraine) and Alexander Rybak (in 2009 for Norway) with their winning songs; Leandros also performed her 1967 Eurovision entry "L'amour est bleu" with Rybak.

Final – 27 January 2024
R/O	Artist	Song	Jury	Televote	Total	Place
1	Joel Marques Cunha	"Believer"	44	59	103	3
2	Edsun	"Finally Alive"	16	17	33	7
3	Naomi Ayé	"Paumée sur terre"	58	19	77	4
4	Angy and Rafa Ela	"Drop"	30	22	52	5
5	One Last Time	"Devil in the Detail"	18	29	47	6
6	Krick	"Drowning in the Rain"	74	74	148	2
7	Chaild	"Hold On"	2	27	29	8
8	Tali	"Fighter"	94	88	182	1

Superfinal – 27 January 2024
Artist	Song	Jury	Televote	Total	Place
Joel Marques Cunha	"Believer"	66	70	136	3
Krick	"Drowning in the Rain"	80	85	165	2
Tali	"Fighter"	94	84	178	1

Detailed international jury votes (Superfinal)
Song	United Kingdom	Cyprus	Belgium	Slovenia	Germany	Portugal	France	Sweden	Total
Song	United Kingdom	Cyprus	Belgium	Slovenia	Germany	Portugal	France	Sweden	Total
"Believer"	8	8	10	8	8	8	8	8	66
"Drowning in the Rain"	10	10	8	10	12	10	10	10	80
"Fighter"	12	12	12	12	10	12	12	12	94

International jury members
Country	Jury members
Belgium	Tiffany Baworowski; Marie Benmokaddem; Alexandre Germys; Laura Groeseneken (spokesperson); Joël Habay
Cyprus	Andri Aggelidou; Argyro Christodoulidou; Nikos Evangelou; Kypros Karaviotis; Gore Melian (spokesperson)
France	Hédia Charni; Roberto Ciurleo; Julien Gonçalves; Antoine Gouiffes-Yan; Julien Tchobanoff (spokesperson)
Germany	Chris Harms; Lukas Heinser; Uwe Kanthak (spokesperson); Alina Stiegler; Peter Urban
Portugal	Ana Carina Fernandes Jorge de Almeida (spokesperson); Ana Margarida Laíns da Silva Augusto; Ana Gonçalves; Pedro Granger; Pedro Penim
Slovenia	Jernej Dirnbek; Miha Gorše; Tinkara Kovač (spokesperson); Nikola Sekulovič; Urša Vlašič
Sweden	Arantxa Alvarez; Emelie Fjällström; Nanne Grönvall; Isa Tengblad (spokesperson); Oscar Zia
United Kingdom	AJ Bentley (spokesperson); Ross Gautreau; Jack Hawitt; Juliet Russell; Emma Stevens

=== Promotion and preparation ===
As part of the promotion of her participation in the contest, Tali attended the London Eurovision Party on 7 April 2024 and the Eurovision in Concert event in Amsterdam on 13 April 2024. She additionally revealed that her entry "Fighter" would undergo a revamp ahead of the contest, which was released on 29 March 2024.

== At Eurovision ==
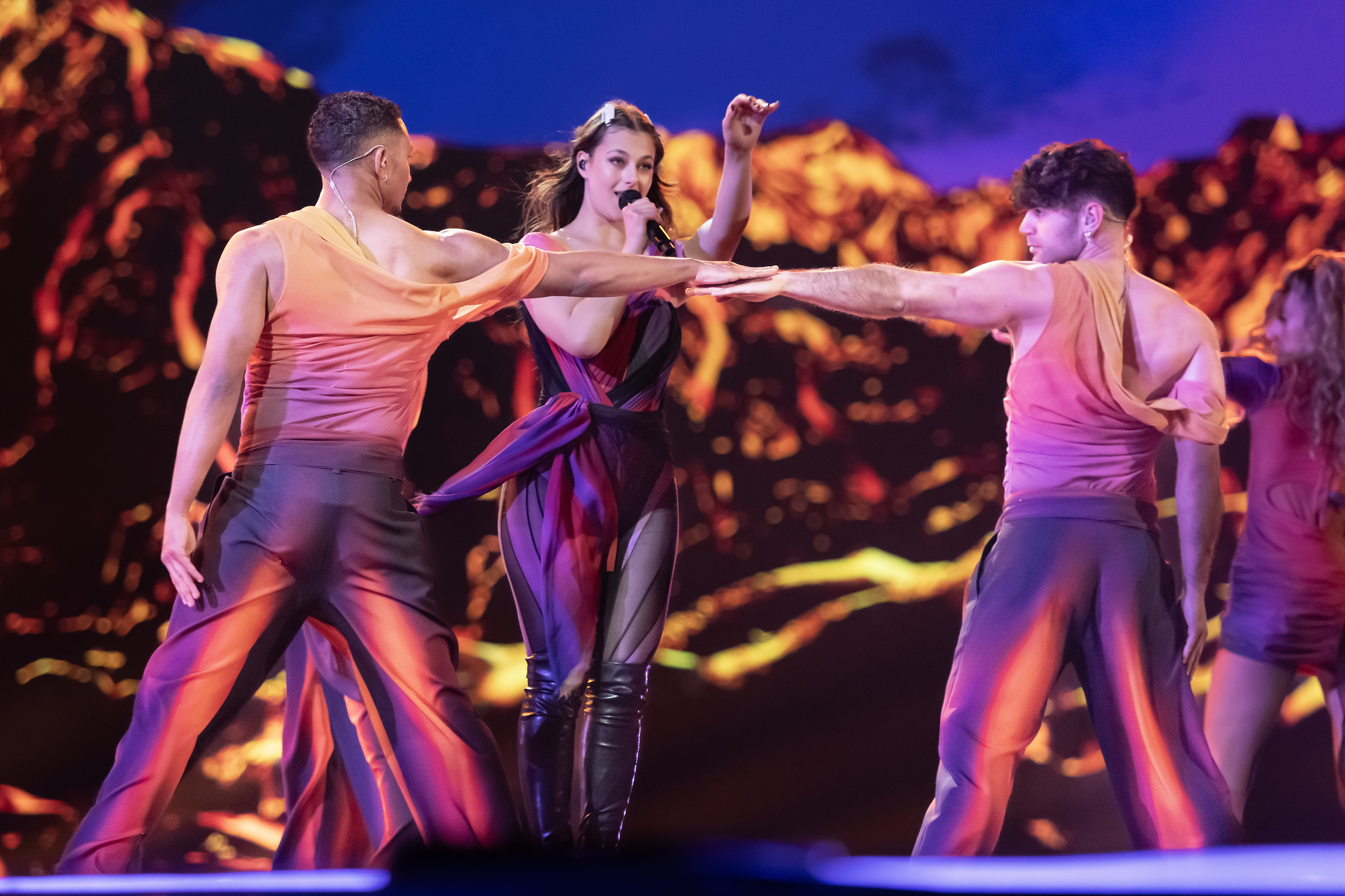
Tali during a rehearsal before the final.

The Eurovision Song Contest 2024 took place at the Malmö Arena in Malmö, Sweden, and consisted of two semi-finals held on the respective dates of 7 and 9 May and the final on 11 May 2024. All nations with the exceptions of the host country and the "Big Five" (France, Germany, Italy, Spain and the United Kingdom) were required to qualify from one of two semi-finals in order to compete in the final; the top ten countries from each semi-final progressed to the final. On 30 January 2024, an allocation draw was held to determine which of the two semi-finals, as well as which half of the show, each country would perform in; the EBU split up the competing countries into different pots based on voting patterns from previous contests, with countries with favourable voting histories put into the same pot. Luxembourg was scheduled for the second half of the first semi-final. The shows' producers then decided the running order for the semi-finals; Luxembourg was set to close the show in position 15.

In Luxembourg, all three shows were broadcast on RTL, RTL Radio and Today Radio, as well as online via rtl.lu and RTL Play, with Luxembourgish-language commentary by Roger Saurfeld and Raoul Roos; on RTL Today, with English-language commentary by Sarah Tapp and Meredith Moss; and (first semi-final and final) on RTL Infos, with French-language commentary by Jerôme Didelot and Emma Sorgato.

=== Performance ===
Tali took part in technical rehearsals on 28 April and 1 May, followed by dress rehearsals on 6 and 7 May. The staging of her performance of "Fighter" at the contest is directed by German Nenov (creative director for Ukraine in 2023 as well as at the 2021 and 2022 junior contests). She is joined on stage by red-clad supporting dancers.

=== Semi-final ===
Luxembourg performed last, in position 15, following the entry from Portugal. At the end of the show, the country was announced as a qualifier for the final. It was later revealed that Luxembourg placed fifth out of the fifteen participating countries in the first semi-final with 117 points.

=== Final ===
Following the semi-final, Luxembourg was drawn to perform in the first half of the final. Luxembourg performed in position 4, following the entry from Germany and before the entry from Israel (following the Netherlands' disqualification). Tali once again took part in dress rehearsals on 10 and 11 May before the final, including the jury final where the professional juries cast their final votes before the live show on 11 May. She performed a repeat of her semi-final performance during the final on 11 May. Luxembourg placed thirteenth in the final, scoring 103 points; 20 points from the public televoting and 83 points from the juries.

=== Voting ===
Below is a breakdown of points awarded by and to Luxembourg in the first semi-final and in the final. Voting during the three shows involved each country awarding sets of points from 1-8, 10 and 12: one from their professional jury and the other from televoting in the final vote, while the semi-final vote was based entirely on the vote of the public. The Luxembourgish jury consisted of Vanessa Cum, Patrick Greis, Germain Leon Martin, Alfred Nicolas Medernach, and Irem Sosay. In the first semi-final, Luxembourg placed 5th with 117 points, and guaranteeing Luxembourg's first appearance in a Eurovision final since 1993. In the final, Luxembourg placed 13th with 103 points, receiving the maximum twelve points in the jury vote and televote from Israel. Over the course of the contest, Luxembourg awarded its 12 points to Portugal in the first semi-final, and Switzerland (jury) and Israel (televote) in the final.

RTL appointed Désirée Nosbusch, presenter of the 1984 contest, as its spokesperson to announce the Luxembourgish jury's votes in the final.

==== Points awarded to Luxembourg ====
Points awarded to Luxembourg (Semi-final 1)
Score	Televote
12 points	
10 points	Portugal
8 points	Azerbaijan; Cyprus; Serbia
7 points	Croatia; Germany; Lithuania; Moldova; Sweden; Ukraine
6 points	Finland; Ireland; Poland; Rest of the World
5 points	Iceland; Slovenia
4 points	Australia
3 points	United Kingdom
2 points	
1 point	

Points awarded to Luxembourg (Final)
Score	Televote	Jury
12 points	Israel	Israel
10 points		
8 points		Azerbaijan; Ireland
7 points		France
6 points		Sweden
5 points		Croatia; Slovenia
4 points	Rest of the World	Albania; Cyprus; Finland; Malta; United Kingdom
3 points	France	Germany; Greece
2 points		Australia; Moldova
1 point	Belgium	Denmark; Ukraine

==== Points awarded by Luxembourg ====
Points awarded by Luxembourg (Semi-final 1)
Score	Televote
12 points	Portugal
10 points	Lithuania
8 points	Ukraine
7 points	Croatia
6 points	Ireland
5 points	Serbia
4 points	Cyprus
3 points	Australia
2 points	Finland
1 point	Slovenia

Points awarded by Luxembourg (Final)
Score	Televote	Jury
12 points	Israel	Switzerland
10 points	Croatia	France
8 points	France	Latvia
7 points	Ukraine	Cyprus
6 points	Portugal	Croatia
5 points	Greece	Ukraine
4 points	Lithuania	Germany
3 points	Italy	Portugal
2 points	Switzerland	Armenia
1 point	Germany	Sweden

==== Detailed voting results ====
Each participating broadcaster assembles a five-member jury panel consisting of music industry professionals who are citizens of the country they represent. Each jury, and individual jury member, is required to meet a strict set of criteria regarding professional background, as well as diversity in gender and age. No member of a national jury was permitted to be related in any way to any of the competing acts in such a way that they cannot vote impartially and independently. The individual rankings of each jury member as well as the nation's televoting results were released shortly after the grand final.

The following members comprised the Luxembourgish jury:

- Vanessa Cum
- Patrick Greis
- Germain Leon Martin
- Alfred Nicolas Medernach
- Irem Sosay

Detailed voting results from Luxembourg (Semi-final 1)
R/O	Country	Televote	
R/O	Country	Rank	Points
01	Cyprus	7	4
02	Serbia	6	5
03	Lithuania	2	10
04	Ireland	5	6
05	Ukraine	3	8
06	Poland	14	
07	Croatia	4	7
08	Iceland	12	
09	Slovenia	10	1
10	Finland	9	2
11	Moldova	13	
12	Azerbaijan	11	
13	Australia	8	3
14	Portugal	1	12
15	Luxembourg		

Detailed voting results from Luxembourg (Final)
R/O	Country	Jury							Televote	
R/O	Country	Juror A	Juror B	Juror C	Juror D	Juror E	Rank	Points	Rank	Points
01	Sweden	13	13	2	13	21	11	1	19	
02	Ukraine	17	5	12	12	3	7	5	4	7
03	Germany	19	9	3	18	6	8	4	10	1
04	Luxembourg									
~~05~~	~~Netherlands~~ ‡ (Note: The Netherlands was disqualified prior to the final.)	~~1~~	~~25~~	~~11~~	~~1~~	~~8~~	~~2~~		N/A	
06	Israel	11	6	9	20	23	18		1	12
07	Lithuania	9	20	13	6	12	16		7	4
08	Spain	8	19	25	15	24	22		17	
09	Estonia	25	18	24	23	10	24		13	
10	Ireland	24	12	6	25	4	13		11	
11	Latvia	4	2	10	24	18	4	8	12	
12	Greece	23	17	22	7	19	21		6	5
13	United Kingdom	12	22	23	19	22	25		21	
14	Norway	22	4	8	22	17	15		22	
15	Italy	21	16	7	9	9	17		8	3
16	Serbia	7	11	18	11	5	12		16	
17	Finland	6	23	16	5	20	14		15	
18	Portugal	14	8	15	14	2	9	3	5	6
19	Armenia	10	15	21	3	7	10	2	14	
20	Cyprus	5	7	4	16	11	5	7	18	
21	Switzerland	2	1	20	2	1	1	12	9	2
22	Slovenia	20	14	17	17	13	23		23	
23	Croatia	15	10	1	10	15	6	6	2	10
24	Georgia	16	21	5	21	25	20		24	
25	France	3	3	19	8	14	3	10	3	8
26	Austria	18	24	14	4	16	19		20	
