= Firefighter (song) =

2024 song by Nutsa Buzaladze

Single by Nutsa Buzaladze
- Released: 11 March 2024
- Length: 3:04
- Label: Stop Talking
- Songwriters: Ada Satka; Darko Dimitrov

Nutsa Buzaladze singles chronology
"L.O.V.E" (2023)	"Firefighter" (2024)	"Mother's Love" (2024)

Music video
- "Firefighter" on YouTube

Eurovision Song Contest 2024 entry
- Country: Georgia
- Artist: Nutsa Buzaladze
- Language: English

Finals performance
- Semi-final result: 8th
- Semi-final points: 54
- Final result: 21st
- Final points: 34

Entry chronology
- ◄ "Echo" (2023)
- "Freedom" (2025) ►

Official performance video
- "Firefighter" (Second Semi-Final) on YouTube "Firefighter" (Grand Final) on YouTube

"Firefighter" is a song by Georgian singer Nutsa Buzaladze, released on 11 March 2024 by Stop Talking. It was written by Ada Satka and Darko Dimitrov, and represented Georgia in the Eurovision Song Contest 2024, where it placed 21st in the grand final with 34 points. In the process, the song became the first Georgian entry to qualify for the grand final since 2016.

== Background and composition ==
"Firefighter" was written by Ada Satka and Darko Dimitrov. In an analysis by Wiwibloggs' Rezo Mamsikashvili, they wrote that the song represented a "metaphorical fight" against hate, hoping to display kindness and love in the wake of times of struggle and hatred. In interviews, Buzaladze stated that throughout her life, she fought "negativity with love always... Fire represents all this negativity that is going on in the world right now. I’m trying to save this love and I am actually putting out the fire with love."

According to Buzaladze, she was first offered to compete in Eurovision when a producer from Georgian Public Broadcaster (GPB) called her while she lived in Miami. Upon the producer accepting the condition that she would be involved in "every little detail" of the entry, she accepted the offer. On 6 March, the song's title, "Firefighter", was announced, with the song officially releasing five days later.

== Music video and promotion ==
Along with the song's release, an accompanying music video directed by Zaza Orashvili was released. To further promote the song, Buzaladze announced her intents to participate in various Eurovision pre-parties throughout the months of March and April 2024, including Pre-Party ES on 30 March, the London Eurovision Party on 7 April, and Eurovision in Concert on 13 April.

== Critical reception ==
"Firefighter" has largely drawn neutral to negative reactions. In a Wiwibloggs review containing several reviews from several critics, the song was rated 6.43 out of 10 points, ranking 21st out of the 37 songs competing in the Eurovision Song Contest 2024 on the site's annual ranking. Another review conducted by ESC Bubble that contained reviews from a combination of readers and juries rated the song 11th out of the 16 songs "Firefighter" was competing against in its the Eurovision semi-final. Jon O'Brien, a writer for Vulture, ranked the song 35th overall, proclaiming the song to be a "Frankenstein's monster of a half-dozen different ethnopop bangers, even if none of them are particularly memorable or tuneful". ESC Beat's Doron Lahav ranked the song 26th overall, stating that although he thought Buzaladze's vocal abilities were "very talented", the song was "too technical... regarding the text and the emotions". Erin Adam of The Scotsman rated the song five out of 10 points, writing that the song was a "flawless, if formulaic, entry".

== Eurovision Song Contest ==
=== Internal selection ===
Georgia's broadcaster for the Eurovision Song Contest, the Georgian Public Broadcaster (GPB), confirmed its intentions to participate in the Eurovision Song Contest 2024 on 15 September 2023. Buzaladze was later announced as the country's representative on 12 January 2024, with the songwriting process starting the next day. By mid-February, songwriter Darko Dimitrov was announced to have joined for what would be the song that Buzaladze would sing at the contest.

=== At Eurovision ===
The Eurovision Song Contest 2024 took place at the Malmö Arena in Malmö, Sweden, and consisted of two semi-finals held on the respective dates of 7 and 9 May and the final on 11 May 2024. During the allocation draw on 30 January 2024, Georgia was drawn to compete in the second semi-final, performing in the second half of the show. Buzaladze was later drawn to perform 11th in the semi-final, after San Marino's Megara and before Belgium's Mustii.

For its Eurovision performance, American director Sagiv Karpel was appointed as the creative director. The performance featured Buzaladze in a bronze-coloured outfit accompanied by four backing dancers, with heavy use of pyrotechnics being applied during the performance. "Firefighter" finished eighth, scoring 54 points and securing a position in the grand final. The qualification was the first for the country of Georgia since 2016. In response to her qualification, Buzaladze stated in a press conference that she "dreamed that Georgia would get to the finals after seven years... Many people worked on this performance, and thank you all for doing so. When you work like that, it always pays off. This was my dream."

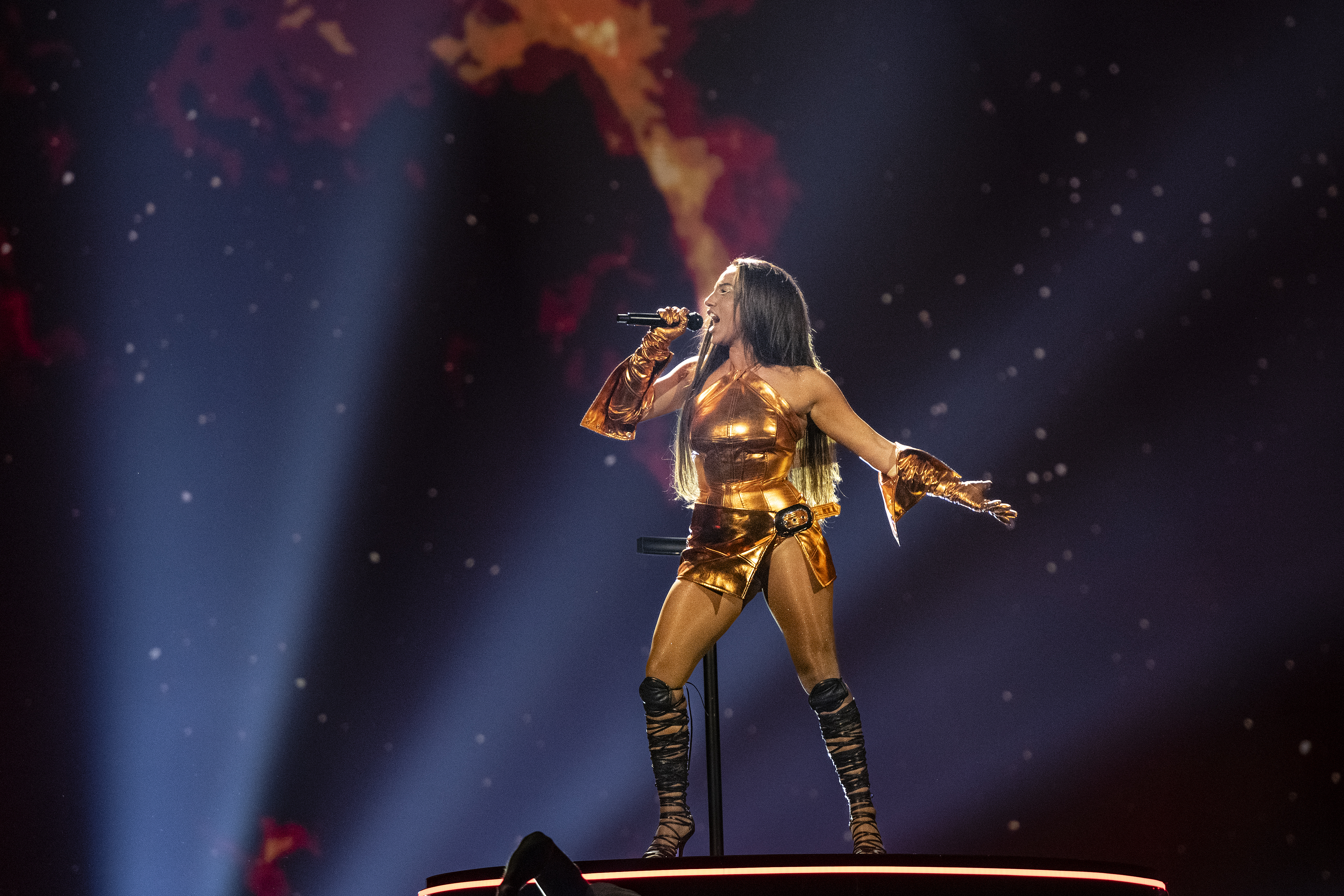
Buzaladze performing "Firefighter" at a dress rehearsal before the second semi-final of Eurovision 2024.

Buzaladze performed a repeat of her performance in the grand final on 11 May. The song was performed 24th in the final, ahead of Croatia's Baby Lasagna and before France's Slimane. After the results were announced, she finished in 21st with a total of 34 points, with a split score of 15 points from juries and 19 points from public televoting. No countries gave a set of the maximum 12 points in either category for the song. Regarding the former, the most a country gave was a set of seven points, awarded by Azerbaijan. Regarding the latter, the most given was five, which was awarded by three countries.

== Charts ==
Chart performance for "Firefighter"
Chart (2024)	Peak position
Lithuania (AGATA)	90

== Release history ==
Release history and format for "Firefighter"
Country	Date	Format(s)	Label	Ref.
Various	11 March 2024	Digital download; streaming	Stop Talking Music Group	
