= Georgia in the Eurovision Song Contest 2024 =

- Eurovision Song Contest 2024
- Participating broadcaster: Georgian Public Broadcaster (GPB)
- Country: Georgia
- Selection process: Internal selection
- Announcement date: Artist: 12 January 2024; Song: 11 March 2024

Competing entry
- Song: "Firefighter"
- Artist: Nutsa Buzaladze
- Songwriters: Ada Satka; Darko Dimitrov

Placement
- Semi-final result: Qualified (8th, 54 points)
- Final result: 21st, 34 points

Participation chronology

Georgia was represented at the Eurovision Song Contest 2024 with the song "Firefighter", written by Ada Satka and Darko Dimitrov, and performed by Nutsa Buzaladze. The Georgian participating broadcaster, the Georgian Public Broadcaster (GPB), internally selected its entry for the contest.

Georgia was drawn to compete in the second semi-final of the Eurovision Song Contest which took place on 9 May 2024 and was later selected to perform in position 11. At the end of the show, "Firefighter" was announced among the top 10 entries of the second semi-final and hence qualified to compete in the final, marking Georgia's first qualification to the final since 2016. It was later revealed that Georgia placed eighth out of the sixteen participating countries in the semi-final with 54 points. In the final, Georgia performed in position 24 and placed twenty-first out of the 25 performing countries, scoring a total of 34 points.

== Background ==
Prior to the 2024 contest, the Georgian Public Broadcaster (GPB) had participated in the Eurovision Song Contest representing Georgia fifteen times since its first entry in 2007. Its highest placing in the contest, to this point, had been ninth place, which was achieved on two occasions: in 2010 with the song "Shine" performed by Sofia Nizharadze and in 2011 with the song "One More Day" performed by Eldrine. GPB briefly withdrew from the contest in 2009 after the European Broadcasting Union (EBU) rejected its entry, "We Don't Wanna Put In", for perceived political references to Russian prime minister Vladimir Putin tied to tense relations between Georgia and then-host country Russia, which stemmed from the 2008 Russo-Georgian War. Georgia had, to this point, failed to qualify to the final on eight occasions, including in 2023 with the song "Echo" performed by Iru.

As part of its duties as participating broadcaster, GPB organises the selection of its entry in the Eurovision Song Contest and broadcasts the event in the country. It had selected its entry for the contest both through national finals and internal selections in the past. For its 2023 participation, GPB selected its entry via the reality television show The Voice Georgia. On 15 September 2023, GPB confirmed its intention to participate in the 2024 contest.

== Before Eurovision ==
=== Internal selection ===
On 12 January 2024, GPB announced that it had internally selected Nutsa Buzaladze as its representative for the 2024 contest, and opened a window lasting between 13 and 30 January for interested composers to submit their entries. At the closing of the period, around 300 entries had been received. By mid-February 2024, the song, titled "Firefighter", had been selected and Buzaladze had started preparations with prolific Eurovision songwriter and producer Darko Dimitrov; it was released on 11 March.

=== Promotion ===
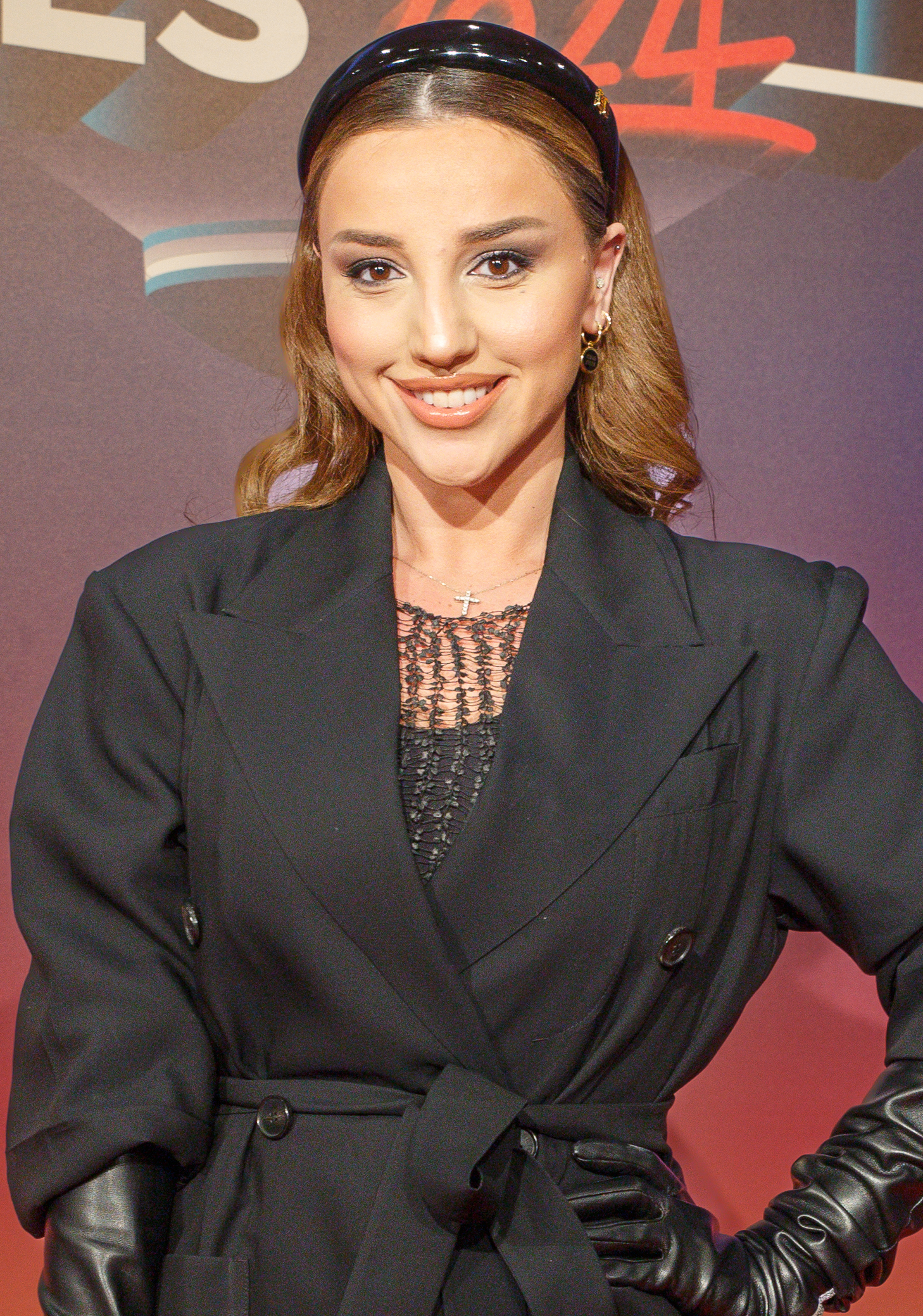
Nutsa Buzaladze at the PrePartyES event in Madrid

As part of the promotion of her participation in the contest, Buzaladze attended the PrePartyES in Madrid on 30 March 2024, the London Eurovision Party on 7 April 2024 and the Eurovision in Concert event in Amsterdam on 13 April 2024. In addition, she performed "Firefighter" during the Georgia vs Luxembourg qualifying play-off for the UEFA Euro 2024, held on 21 March 2024 in Tbilisi.

== At Eurovision ==
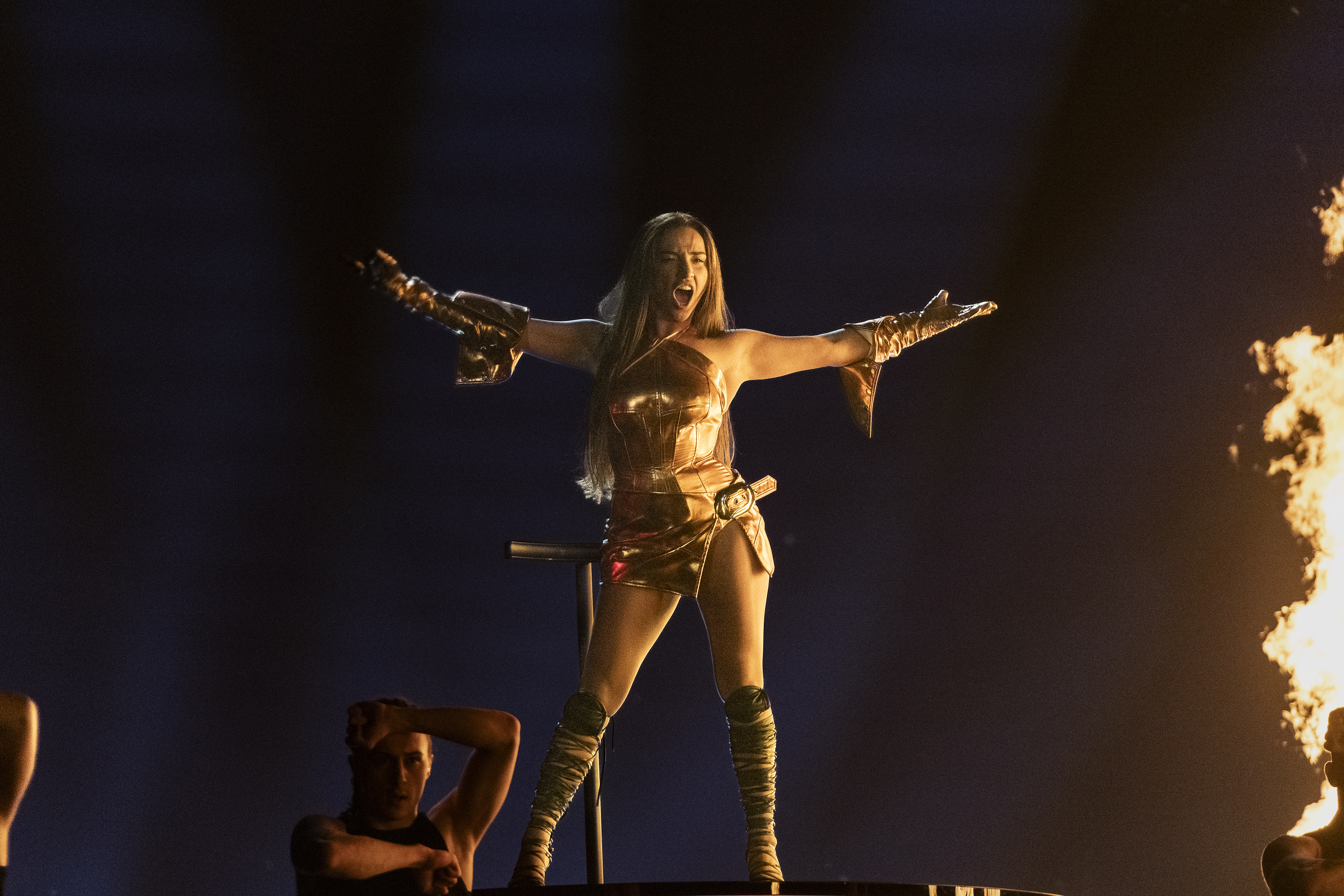
Nutsa Buzaladze during a rehearsal before the final.

The Eurovision Song Contest 2024 took place at the Malmö Arena in Malmö, Sweden, and consisted of two semi-finals held on the respective dates of 7 and 9 May and the final on 11 May 2024. All nations with the exceptions of the host country and the "Big Five" (France, Germany, Italy, Spain and the United Kingdom) were required to qualify from one of two semi-finals in order to compete in the final; the top ten countries from each semi-final progress to the final. On 30 January 2024, an allocation draw was held to determine which of the two semi-finals, as well as which half of the show, each country would perform in; the European Broadcasting Union (EBU) split up the competing countries into different pots based on voting patterns from previous contests, with countries with favourable voting histories put into the same pot. Georgia was scheduled for the second half of the second semi-final. The shows' producers then decided the running order for the semi-finals; Georgia was set to perform in position 11.

In Georgia, all three shows were broadcast on 1TV, with commentary by Nika Lobiladze.

=== Performance ===
Nutsa Buzaladze took part in technical rehearsals on 30 April and 3 May, followed by dress rehearsals on 8 and 9 May. Her performance of "Firefighter" at the contest prominently featured pyrotechnics; she was joined on stage by four supporting dancers.

=== Semi-final ===
Georgia performed in position 11, following the entry from San Marino and before the entry from Belgium. At the end of the show, the country was announced as a qualifier for the final. It was later revealed that Georgia placed eighth out of the sixteen participating countries in the second semi-final with 54 points.

=== Final ===
Following the semi-final, Georgia drew "producer's choice" for the final, meaning that the country would perform in the half decided by the contest's producers. Georgia was then placed in position 24, following the entry from Croatia and before the entry from France. Nutsa Buzaladze once again took part in dress rehearsals on 10 and 11 May before the final, including the jury final where the professional juries cast their final votes before the live show on 11 May. She performed a repeat of her semi-final performance during the final on 11 May. Georgia placed twenty-first in the final, scoring 34 points; 19 points from the public televoting and 15 points from the juries.

=== Voting ===
Below is a breakdown of points awarded to and by Georgia in the second semi-final and in the final. Voting during the three shows involved each country awarding sets of points from 1-8, 10 and 12: one from their professional jury and the other from televoting in the final vote, while the semi-final vote was based entirely on the vote of the public. The Georgian jury consisted of Nino Badurashvili, Tinatin Jamburia, Arhil Nizharadze, Merab Nutsubidze, and Merab Sanodze. In the second semi-final, Georgia placed 8th with 54 points, resulting in the country's first qualification to the final since 2016. In the final, Georgia placed 21st with 34 points. Over the course of the contest, Georgia awarded its 12 points to Armenia in the second semi-final, and to Switzerland (jury) and Ukraine (televote) in the final.

GPB appointed Sopho Khalvashi, who represented Georgia in the 2007 contest, as its spokesperson to announce the Georgian jury's votes in the final.

==== Points awarded to Georgia ====
Points awarded to Georgia (Semi-final 2)
| Score | Televote |
|---|---|
| 12 points | |
| 10 points | Armenia |
| 8 points | |
| 7 points | Albania |
| 6 points | France; Greece; Israel |
| 5 points | Italy |
| 4 points | Malta; Rest of the World |
| 3 points | |
| 2 points | Belgium |
| 1 point | Austria; Czechia; Estonia; Spain |

Points awarded to Georgia (Final)
| Score | Televote | Jury |
|---|---|---|
| 12 points | | |
| 10 points | | |
| 8 points | | |
| 7 points | | Azerbaijan |
| 6 points | | |
| 5 points | Armenia; Azerbaijan; Italy | |
| 4 points | Israel | |
| 3 points | | Armenia |
| 2 points | | Israel; Malta |
| 1 point | | Norway |

==== Points awarded by Georgia ====
Points awarded by Georgia (Semi-final 2)
| Score | Televote |
|---|---|
| 12 points | Armenia |
| 10 points | Israel |
| 8 points | Netherlands |
| 7 points | Latvia |
| 6 points | Greece |
| 5 points | Switzerland |
| 4 points | Czechia |
| 3 points | San Marino |
| 2 points | Belgium |
| 1 point | Austria |

Points awarded by Georgia (Final)
| Score | Televote | Jury |
|---|---|---|
| 12 points | Ukraine | Switzerland |
| 10 points | Armenia | France |
| 8 points | Israel | Latvia |
| 7 points | Switzerland | Italy |
| 6 points | France | Armenia |
| 5 points | Croatia | Ukraine |
| 4 points | Ireland | Portugal |
| 3 points | Italy | Israel |
| 2 points | Greece | Germany |
| 1 point | Latvia | Croatia |

==== Detailed voting results ====
Each participating broadcaster assembles a five-member jury panel consisting of music industry professionals who are citizens of the country they represent. Each jury, and individual jury member, is required to meet a strict set of criteria regarding professional background, as well as diversity in gender and age. No member of a national jury was permitted to be related in any way to any of the competing acts in such a way that they cannot vote impartially and independently. The individual rankings of each jury member as well as the nation's televoting results were released shortly after the grand final.

The following members comprised the Georgian jury:

- Nino Badurashvili
- Tinatin Jamburia
- Arhil Nizharadze
- Merab Nutsubidze
- Merab Sanodze

Detailed voting results from Georgia (Semi-final 2)
| R/O | Country | Televote | |
| R/O | Country | Rank | Points |
|---|---|---|---|
| 01 | Malta | 13 | |
| 02 | Albania | 15 | |
| 03 | Greece | 5 | 6 |
| 04 | Switzerland | 6 | 5 |
| 05 | Czechia | 7 | 4 |
| 06 | Austria | 10 | 1 |
| 07 | Denmark | 14 | |
| 08 | Armenia | 1 | 12 |
| 09 | Latvia | 4 | 7 |
| 10 | San Marino | 8 | 3 |
| 11 | Georgia | | |
| 12 | Belgium | 9 | 2 |
| 13 | Estonia | 11 | |
| 14 | Israel | 2 | 10 |
| 15 | Norway | 12 | |
| 16 | Netherlands | 3 | 8 |

Detailed voting results from Georgia (Final)
| R/O | Country | Jury | | | | | | | Televote | |
| R/O | Country | Juror A | Juror B | Juror C | Juror D | Juror E | Rank | Points | Rank | Points |
|---|---|---|---|---|---|---|---|---|---|---|
| 01 | Sweden | 7 | 18 | 18 | 17 | 11 | 12 | | 19 | |
| 02 | Ukraine | 1 | 8 | 7 | 7 | 6 | 6 | 5 | 1 | 12 |
| 03 | Germany | 8 | 9 | 16 | 6 | 10 | 9 | 2 | 21 | |
| 04 | Luxembourg | 16 | 24 | 17 | 12 | 9 | 15 | | 20 | |
| ~~05~~ | ~~Netherlands~~ ‡ (Note: The Netherlands was disqualified prior to the final.) | ~~15~~ | ~~21~~ | ~~13~~ | ~~13~~ | ~~20~~ | ~~18~~ | | N/A | |
| 06 | Israel | 23 | 4 | 8 | 8 | 14 | 8 | 3 | 3 | 8 |
| 07 | Lithuania | 22 | 22 | 24 | 18 | 16 | 24 | | 11 | |
| 08 | Spain | 12 | 16 | 23 | 20 | 19 | 20 | | 14 | |
| 09 | Estonia | 14 | 19 | 22 | 22 | 21 | 22 | | 17 | |
| 10 | Ireland | 21 | 25 | 25 | 25 | 25 | 25 | | 7 | 4 |
| 11 | Latvia | 24 | 1 | 1 | 2 | 5 | 3 | 8 | 10 | 1 |
| 12 | Greece | 9 | 20 | 20 | 11 | 8 | 11 | | 9 | 2 |
| 13 | United Kingdom | 17 | 15 | 21 | 21 | 24 | 23 | | 22 | |
| 14 | Norway | 10 | 23 | 15 | 19 | 22 | 19 | | 15 | |
| 15 | Italy | 5 | 3 | 4 | 4 | 3 | 4 | 7 | 8 | 3 |
| 16 | Serbia | 25 | 7 | 14 | 23 | 18 | 14 | | 24 | |
| 17 | Finland | 13 | 14 | 19 | 24 | 23 | 21 | | 13 | |
| 18 | Portugal | 6 | 10 | 6 | 9 | 7 | 7 | 4 | 23 | |
| 19 | Armenia | 4 | 6 | 3 | 5 | 2 | 5 | 6 | 2 | 10 |
| 20 | Cyprus | 18 | 13 | 11 | 16 | 13 | 16 | | 16 | |
| 21 | Switzerland | 2 | 2 | 5 | 3 | 1 | 1 | 12 | 4 | 7 |
| 22 | Slovenia | 20 | 12 | 12 | 14 | 15 | 17 | | 12 | |
| 23 | Croatia | 11 | 11 | 10 | 10 | 17 | 10 | 1 | 6 | 5 |
| 24 | Georgia | | | | | | | | | |
| 25 | France | 3 | 5 | 2 | 1 | 4 | 2 | 10 | 5 | 6 |
| 26 | Austria | 19 | 17 | 9 | 15 | 12 | 13 | | 18 | |
