= Belgium in the Eurovision Song Contest 2024 =

- Eurovision Song Contest 2024
- Participating broadcaster: Radio-télévision belge de la Communauté française (RTBF)
- Country: Belgium
- Selection process: Internal selection
- Announcement date: Artist: 30 August 2023; Song: 20 February 2024

Competing entry
- Song: "Before the Party's Over"
- Artist: Mustii
- Songwriters: Arianna Damato; Benoit Leclercq; Charlotte Clark; Nina Sampermans; Pierre Dumoulin; Thomas Mustin

Placement
- Semi-final result: Failed to qualify (13th)

Participation chronology

Belgium was represented at the Eurovision Song Contest 2024 with the song "Before the Party's Over", written by Arianna Damato, Benoit Leclercq, Charlotte Clark, Nina Sampermans, Pierre Dumoulin, and Thomas Mustin, and performed by Mustin himself under his stage name Mustii. The Belgian participating broadcaster, Walloon Radio-télévision belge de la Communauté française (RTBF), internally selected the Belgian entry for the contest.

Belgium was drawn to compete in the second semi-final, which took place on 9 May 2024. Performing during the show in position 12, Belgium was not announced among the top 10 entries of the second semi-final and therefore failed to qualify to compete in the final on 11 May. It was later revealed that Belgium placed 13th out of the 16 participating countries in the semi-final with 18 points.

== Background ==
Prior to the 2024 contest, Belgium had participated in the Eurovision Song Contest sixty-four times since its debut as one of seven countries to take part in 1956, only missing the 1994, 1997, and 2001 editions. Since then, the country has won the contest on one occasion in 1986 with the song "J'aime la vie", performed by Sandra Kim. Following the introduction of semi-finals for 2004, Belgium had featured in nine finals. In 2023, "Because of You" by Gustaph represented the country, qualifying for the final and ultimately placing 7th.

The Belgian participation in the contest alternates between two broadcasters: Flemish Vlaamse Radio- en Televisieomroeporganisatie (VRT) and Walloon Radio-télévision belge de la Communauté française (RTBF) at the time, with both broadcasters sharing the broadcasting rights. Both broadcasters –and their predecessors– had selected the Belgian entry using national finals and internal selections in the past. On 16 August 2023, RTBF –who had the turn– confirmed its intention to participate in the 2024 contest, opting for an internal selection.

== Before Eurovision ==
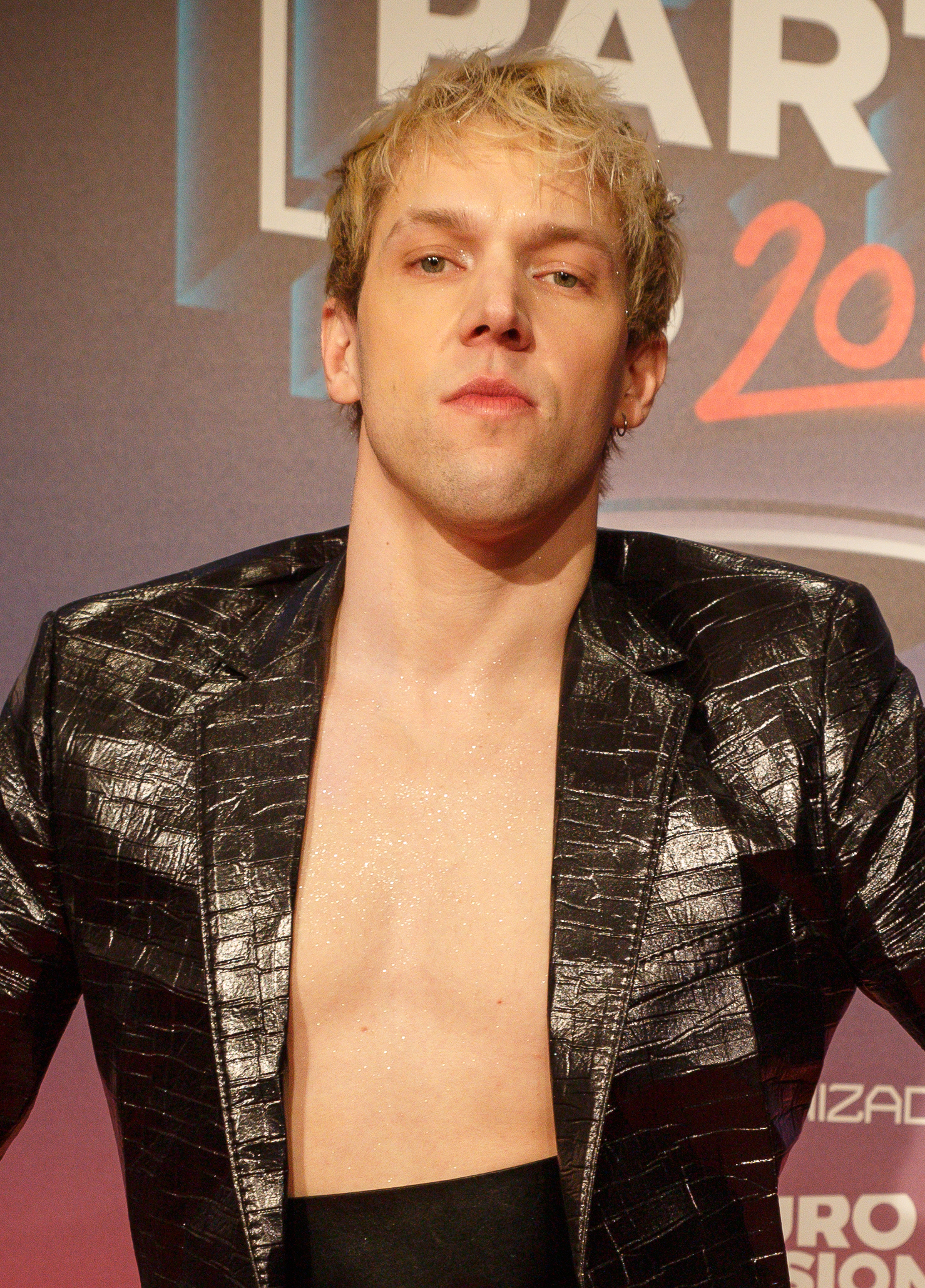
Mustii at the PrePartyES event in Madrid

=== Internal selection ===
On 30 August 2023, RTBF announced they had internally selected Mustii as the Belgian entrant for the Eurovision Song Contest 2024. His entry was selected later, with RTBF calling for interested people to register on a dedicated website between 11 and 17 January 2024 in order to record a repeated line, which was intended to be included as a choir in the final version of the song; at the closing of the window, over 1,000 people had recorded the line, mostly from abroad. The entry, titled "Before the Party's Over", officially premiered on 20 February 2024 on the radio programme Le 8/9 on VivaCité; however, it was accidentally played in its entirety on Tipik two days prior.

=== Promotion ===
As part of the promotion of his participation in the contest, Mustii attended the PrePartyES in Madrid on 30 March 2024, the Barcelona Eurovision Party on 6 April 2024, the London Eurovision Party on 7 April 2024, the Eurovision in Concert event in Amsterdam on 13 April 2024, and the Nordic Eurovision Party in Stockholm on 14 April 2024. In addition, he performed at the Eurovision Village in Malmö on 4 May 2024.

=== Calls for exclusion of Israel ===
The inclusion of Israel in the list of participants of the 2024 contest, despite the humanitarian crisis resulting from Israeli military operations in the Gaza Strip during the Gaza war, sparked controversy in Belgium as well as several other participating countries, with several groups and politicians in the country calling for the removal of Israel from the contest, including the Walloon and Flemish ministers of media Bénédicte Linard and Benjamin Dalle. VRT's broadcast of the second semi-final, in which Israel was set to compete, started with a message aired by the broadcaster's internal trade union which called out Israel's human rights violations and alleged destruction of the freedom of press during the war.

== At Eurovision ==
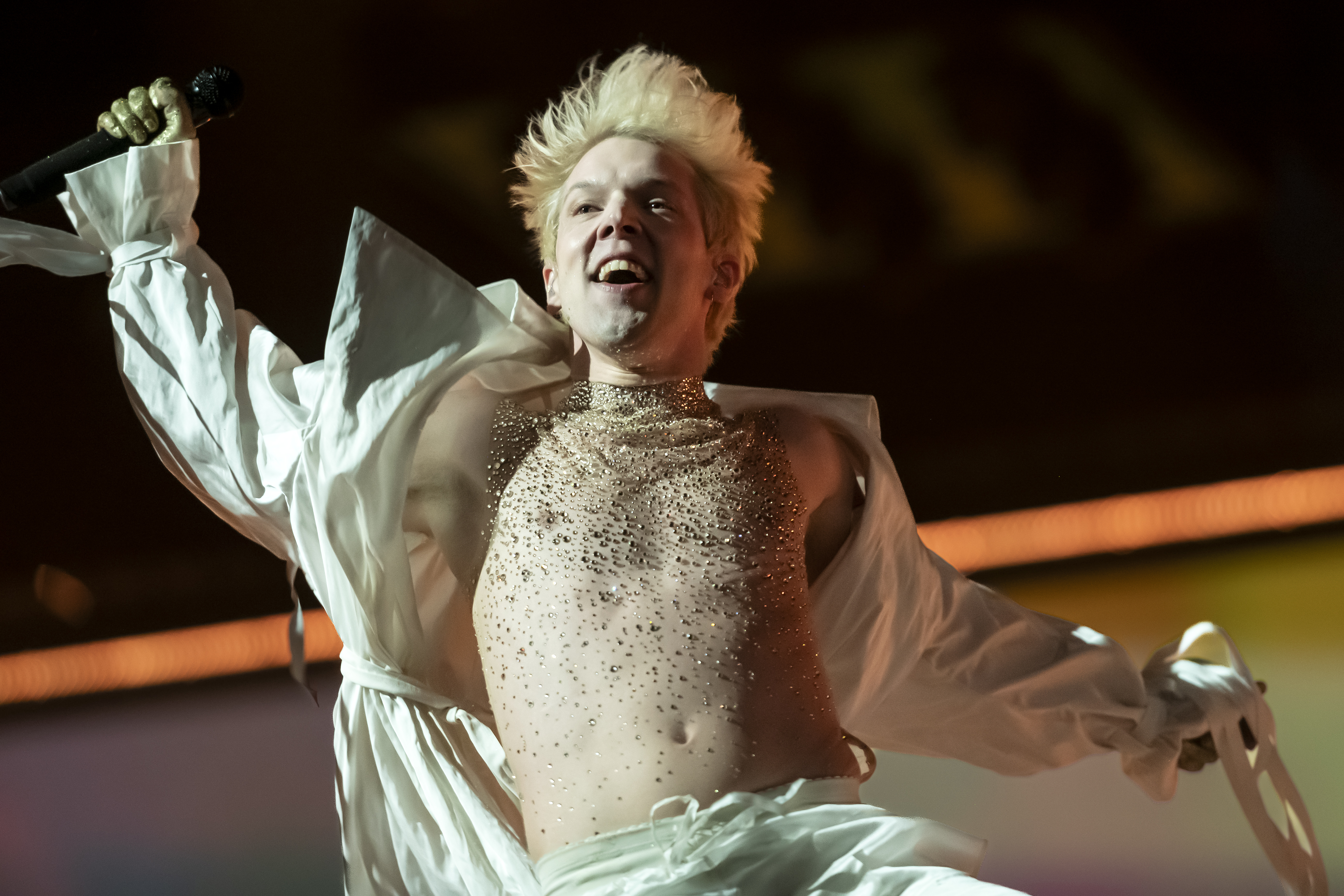
Mustii during a rehearsal before the second semi-final.

The Eurovision Song Contest 2024 took place at the Malmö Arena in Malmö, Sweden, and consisted of two semi-finals held on the respective dates of 7 and 9 May and the final on 11 May 2024. All nations with the exceptions of the host country and the "Big Five" (France, Germany, Italy, Spain and the United Kingdom) were required to qualify from one of two semi-finals in order to compete in the final; the top ten countries from each semi-final progressed to the final. On 30 January 2024, an allocation draw was held to determine which of the two semi-finals, as well as which half of the show, each country would perform in; the European Broadcasting Union (EBU) split up the competing countries into different pots based on voting patterns from previous contests, with countries with favourable voting histories put into the same pot. Belgium was scheduled for the second half of the second semi-final. The shows' producers then decided the running order for the semi-finals; Belgium was set to perform in position 12.

In Wallonia, RTBF broadcast the first semi-final on Tipik and the second semi-final and the final on La Une, as well as all shows on its streaming platform Auvio and the final on radio via VivaCité, with commentary by Maureen Louys and Jean-Louis Lahaye. In Flanders, VRT broadcast all shows on VRT 1 as well as on its streaming platform VRT MAX, and the final on Radio 2, with commentary by Peter Van de Veire; Van de Veire also hosted the pre-show Hello Malmö on VRT 1. In addition, as part of the Eurovision programming, VRT broadcast the Het Grote Songfestivalfeest concert on 27 April and 4 May; a documentary titled ABBA – Against the Odds on 28 April and 5 May, which it cooperated to produce with DR and SVT alongside other EBU member broadcasters – namely ARD/WDR, the BBC, ČT, ERR, France Télévisions, NRK, NTR, RÚV, and Yle – on the occasion of the 50th anniversary of Sweden's first victory at the contest with "Waterloo" by ABBA; and the documentary Mustii, de weg naar Malmö on 8 May, dedicated to Mustii's Eurovision journey; a number of other Eurovision-themed programmes are airing during the week on VRT 1, Radio 2 and MNM.

=== Performance ===
Mustii took part in technical rehearsals on 30 April and 3 May, followed by dress rehearsals on 8 and 9 May. His performance of "Before the Party's Over" at the contest prominently featured smoke; he sang on a platform surrounded by several microphones. His outfit was designed by Elke Oost.

=== Semi-final ===
Belgium performed in position 12, following the entry from Georgia and before the entry from Estonia. The country was not announced among the top 10 entries in the semi-final and therefore failed to qualify to compete in the final.

=== Voting ===
Below is a breakdown of points awarded to and by Belgium in the second semi-final and in the final. Voting during the three shows involved each country awarding sets of points from 1-8, 10 and 12: one from their professional jury and the other from televoting in the final vote, while the semi-final vote was based entirely on the vote of the public. The Belgian jury consisted of Olivier Biron, Antoine Decocq, Fanny Gillard, Alice Van Eesbeeck, and Aurel Zola Kiese. In the second semi-final, Belgium placed 13th with 18 points. Over the course of the contest, Belgium awarded its 12 points to the Netherlands in the second semi-final, and to France (jury) and Israel (televote) in the final.

RTBF appointed Livia Dushkoff as its spokesperson to announce the Belgian jury's votes in the final.

==== Points awarded to Belgium ====
Points awarded to Belgium (Semi-final 2)
Score	Televote
12 points	
10 points	
8 points	
7 points	
6 points	
5 points	France; Netherlands
4 points	
3 points	
2 points	Albania; Georgia; Israel
1 point	Greece; Latvia

==== Points awarded by Belgium ====
Points awarded by Belgium (Semi-final 2)
Score	Televote
12 points	Netherlands
10 points	Israel
8 points	Greece
7 points	Switzerland
6 points	Armenia
5 points	Latvia
4 points	Estonia
3 points	Norway
2 points	Georgia
1 point	Austria

Points awarded by Belgium (Final)
Score	Televote	Jury
12 points	Israel	France
10 points	France	Switzerland
8 points	Croatia	Germany
7 points	Ukraine	Italy
6 points	Switzerland	United Kingdom
5 points	Armenia	Israel
4 points	Greece	Ireland
3 points	Italy	Sweden
2 points	Ireland	Portugal
1 point	Luxembourg	Ukraine

==== Detailed voting results ====
Each participating broadcaster assembles a five-member jury panel consisting of music industry professionals who are citizens of the country they represent. Each jury, and individual jury member, is required to meet a strict set of criteria regarding professional background, as well as diversity in gender and age. No member of a national jury was permitted to be related in any way to any of the competing acts in such a way that they cannot vote impartially and independently. The individual rankings of each jury member as well as the nation's televoting results were released shortly after the grand final.

The following members comprised the Belgian jury:

- Olivier Biron
- Antoine Decocq
- Fanny Gillard
- Alice Van Eesbeeck
- Aurel Zola Kiese

Detailed voting results from Belgium (Semi-final 2)
R/O	Country	Televote	
R/O	Country	Rank	Points
01	Malta	13	
02	Albania	15	
03	Greece	3	8
04	Switzerland	4	7
05	Czechia	11	
06	Austria	10	1
07	Denmark	12	
08	Armenia	5	6
09	Latvia	6	5
10	San Marino	14	
11	Georgia	9	2
12	Belgium		
13	Estonia	7	4
14	Israel	2	10
15	Norway	8	3
16	Netherlands	1	12

Detailed voting results from Belgium (Final)
R/O	Country	Jury							Televote	
R/O	Country	Juror A	Juror B	Juror C	Juror D	Juror E	Rank	Points	Rank	Points
01	Sweden	4	9	7	9	17	8	3	17	
02	Ukraine	11	8	10	6	19	11	1	4	7
03	Germany	8	3	3	4	6	3	8	20	
04	Luxembourg	16	13	13	12	11	14		10	1
~~05~~	~~Netherlands~~ ‡ (Note: The Netherlands was disqualified prior to the final.)	~~9~~	~~14~~	~~11~~	~~23~~	~~3~~	~~10~~		N/A	
06	Israel	13	5	6	3	8	6	5	1	12
07	Lithuania	22	15	19	20	23	23		11	
08	Spain	26	26	14	24	15	21		12	
09	Estonia	25	25	25	26	26	26		16	
10	Ireland	1	7	26	15	12	7	4	9	2
11	Latvia	24	18	12	13	18	16		13	
12	Greece	15	17	20	19	16	19		7	4
13	United Kingdom	5	4	8	10	5	5	6	23	
14	Norway	21	20	18	22	22	25		21	
15	Italy	6	11	4	5	4	4	7	8	3
16	Serbia	17	12	16	17	24	17		24	
17	Finland	7	22	21	21	14	15		15	
18	Portugal	14	10	5	7	10	9	2	19	
19	Armenia	10	6	15	8	13	12		6	5
20	Cyprus	23	19	23	16	25	24		18	
21	Switzerland	2	2	2	2	2	2	10	5	6
22	Slovenia	18	16	22	18	21	22		25	
23	Croatia	20	24	24	25	9	18		3	8
24	Georgia	19	21	17	14	20	20		22	
25	France	3	1	1	1	1	1	12	2	10
26	Austria	12	23	9	11	7	13		14	
