= Greece in the Eurovision Song Contest 2024 =

- Eurovision Song Contest 2024
- Participating broadcaster: Hellenic Broadcasting Corporation (ERT)
- Country: Greece
- Selection process: Internal selection
- Announcement date: Artist: 24 October 2023; Song: 7 March 2024

Competing entry
- Song: "Zari"
- Artist: Marina Satti
- Songwriters: Gino Borri; Jay Lewitt Stolar; Jordan Richard Palmer; Konstantin Plamenov Beshkov; Manolis Solidakis; Marina Satti; Nick Kodonas; Oge; Vlospa

Placement
- Semi-final result: Qualified (5th, 86 points)
- Final result: 11th, 126 points

Participation chronology

Greece was represented at the Eurovision Song Contest 2024 with the song "Zari", written by Marina Satti, Gino "the Ghost" Borri, Jay Lewitt Stolar, Jordan Richard Palmer, Konstantin Plamenov Beshkov, Manolis "Solmeister" Solidakis, Nick Kodonas, Oge and Vlospa, and performed by Satti herself. The Greek participating broadcaster, the Hellenic Broadcasting Corporation (ERT), internally selected its entry for the contest. Satti was announced as the Greek representative on 24 October 2023, whilst the selected song was presented on 7 March 2024.

A music video for the song was created to promote "Zari" as the Greek Eurovision entry, and the year's participation was sponsored by Eurojackpot through the local gambling operator OPAP. Greece was drawn to compete in the second semi-final of the Eurovision Song Contest which took place on 9 May 2024; it was later selected to perform in the third position. At the end of the show, "Zari" was announced among the top 10 entries of the second semi-final and hence qualified to compete in the final. It was later revealed that Greece placed fifth out of the 16 participating countries in the semi-final with 86 points. In the final, Greece performed in position 12 and placed 11th out of the 25 performing countries, scoring a total of 126 points.

== Background ==
Prior to the 2024 contest, Greece had participated in the Eurovision Song Contest 43 times since its debut in 1974. The nation has won the contest once at that point, in 2005 with the song "My Number One" performed by Helena Paparizou. Following the introduction of semi-finals for the 2004 contest, Greece managed to qualify for the final with each of its entries for several years. Between 2004 and 2013, the nation achieved nine top ten placements in the finals. The first entry to not qualify to the final was "Utopian Land" performed by Argo in 2016; its 16th-place finish in the semi-final marked Greece's worst placing and led to its absence from the final for the first time since 2000, when it did not send an entry. In the 2018 contest, Greece failed to qualify for the second time with the Yianna Terzi song "Oniro mou", finishing 14th in the semi-final. After three consecutive contests when it qualified for the final, Victor Vernicos with "What They Say" failed to qualify to the 2023 final, finishing 13th in the semi-final.

As part of its duties as participating broadcaster, Hellenic Broadcasting Corporation (ERT) organises the selection of its entry contestants in the Eurovision Song Contest and broadcasts the event in the country. ERT predecessor, National Radio Television Foundation (EIRT), debuted as an organizer in 1974, and then ERT took its place from 1975 until 2013, when the broadcaster was shut down by a government directive. It was replaced firstly with the interim Dimosia Tileorasi (DT) and later by the New Hellenic Radio, Internet and Television (NERIT) broadcaster, before reverting to the ERT name by the new government in June 2015. The Greek broadcaster had selected its entries in the past both internally and through the national final format Ellinikós Telikós (most recently held in 2017). ERT confirmed its intention to participate in the 2024 contest on 15 September 2023.

== Before Eurovision ==
=== Internal selection ===
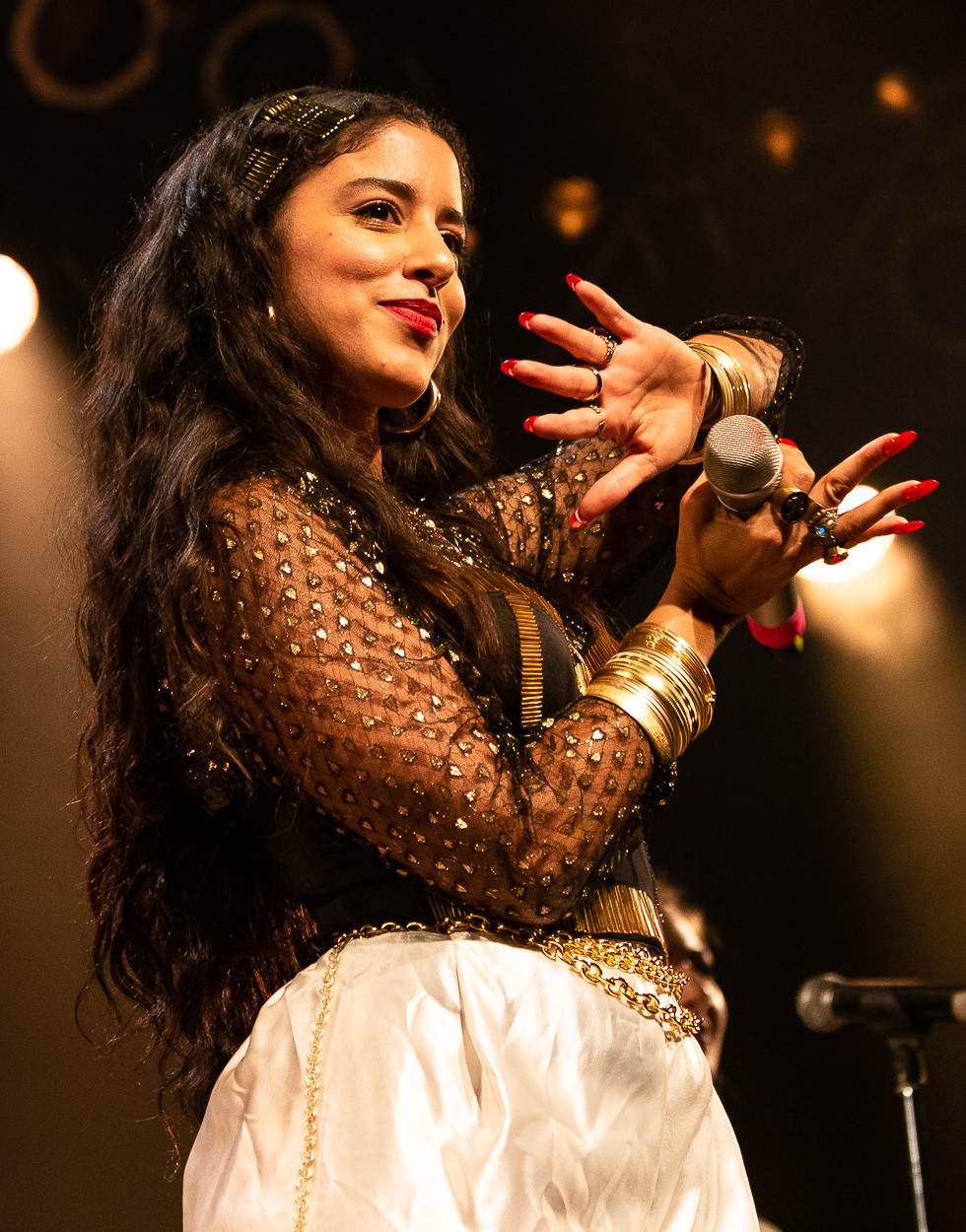
Marina Satti was internally selected by ERT as the Greek entrant for the Eurovision Song Contest 2024.

On 24 October 2023, ERT announced on the TV show Studio 4 that they had carried out an internal selection for its entry and settled on Marina Satti. To determine Satti's song the record labels, Golden Records and Minos EMI, opened a submission window for interested composers. It was opened on 25 October 2023, and closed on 1 December 2023, accumulating 150 song submissions. Satti's record label Minos EMI revealed shortly after that they had already started preparations alongside ERT and Golden Records.

The chosen song, titled "Zari", was released on 7 March 2024 during the special presentation show Eurovision se eidon ("Eurovision in sight"), which aired on ERT1 and was hosted by Fotis Sergoulopoulos and Jenny Melita. "Zari" was composed by Gino the Ghost, Jay Stolar, Jordan Palmer, Kay Be, Nick Kodonas, OGE and Satti, with lyrics by OGE, Satti, Solmeister and Vlospa.

=== Promotion ===
The song's release was accompanied by a music video filmed in various landmarks around Greece, including the Acropolis, Plaka, Monastiraki, the Odeon of Herodes Atticus, Omonoia, Mount Lycabettus, Rafina and the Athens International Airport. It features Satti along with "Scott the American", a longtime American fan of Satti who had previously appeared in several tourism advertisements for Greece. In the video, Scott acts as an Australian tourist while Satti represents a Greek tour guide.

The Greek participation in the contest was sponsored by Eurojackpot through the local gambling operator OPAP. The company organised a public "farewell party" in Voula on 24 April 2024, where Satti met with fans prior to her departure for Eurovision 2024 in Malmö.

=== Voting controversy ===
In mid-April 2024, Greek newspaper Ta Nea reported that as early as 22 February the Cypriot ambassador to Greece, Stavros Avgoustidis, had been informed that ERT prepared to assign Cyprus a predetermined low score in the jury voting of the Eurovision final; this was before the release of "Liar" (Eurovision 2024 entry from Cyprus) and reportedly before the Greek jury was established. In response, ERT president Konstantinos Zoulas denied any involvement of his broadcasting company in the jury vote, while Cypriot broadcaster CyBC's head of press for the contest, Andreas Anastasiou, addressed the matter on a TV broadcast on 15 April, denouncing that the alleged behaviour would constitute a breach of the contest's rules and announcing that the European Broadcasting Union (EBU) had been informed of the controversy. The Greek jury ultimately ranked Cyprus at the second place in the final, awarding it ten points.

== At Eurovision ==
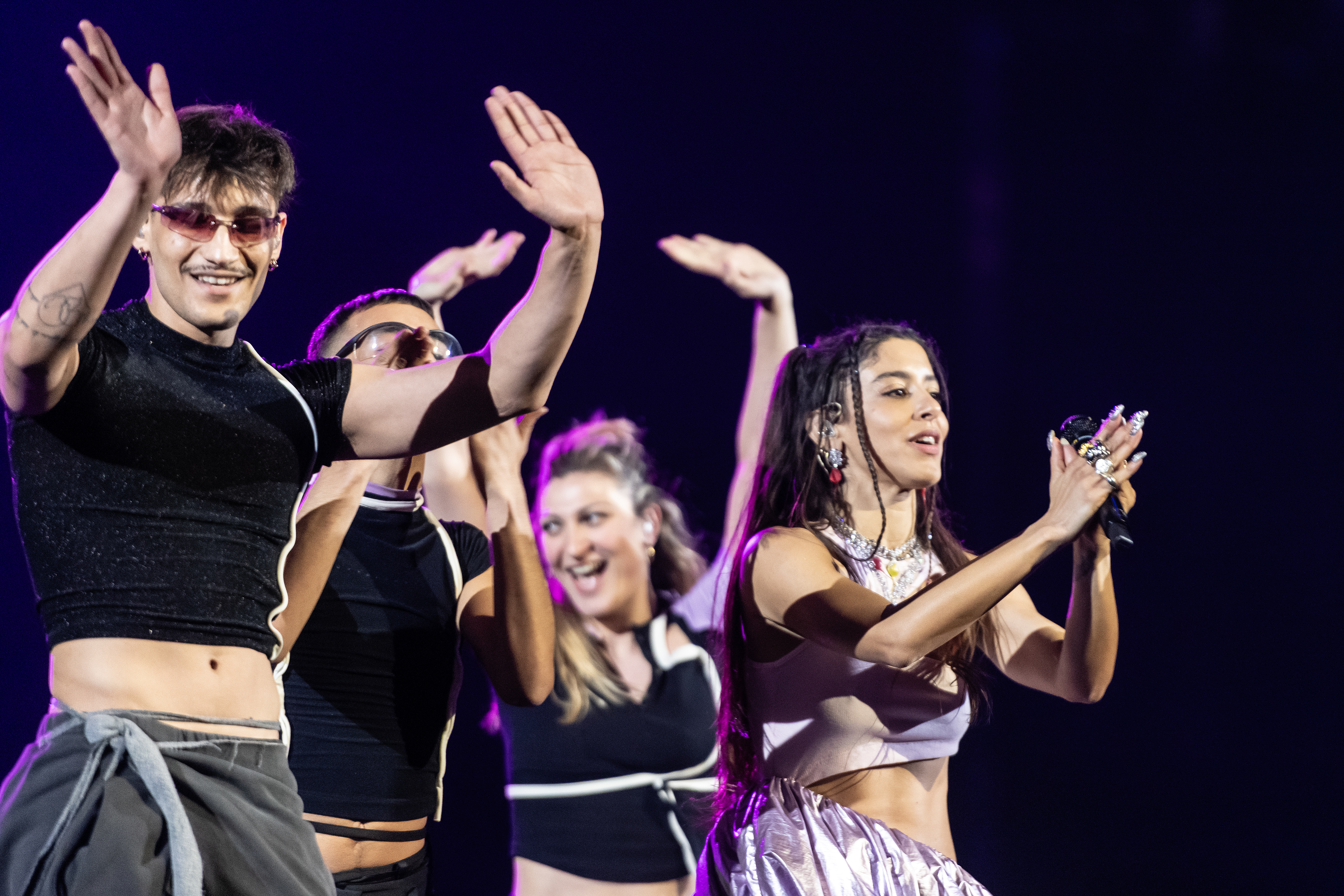
Marina Satti during a rehearsal before the final

The Eurovision Song Contest 2024 took place at the Malmö Arena in Malmö, Sweden, and consisted of two semi-finals held on the respective dates of 7 and 9 May and the final on 11 May 2024. All nations with the exceptions of the host country and the "Big Five" (France, Germany, Italy, Spain and the United Kingdom) were required to qualify from one of two semi-finals in order to compete in the final; the top ten countries from each semi-final progressed to the final. On 30 January 2024, an allocation draw was held to determine which of the two semi-finals, as well as which half of the show, each country would perform in; the EBU split up the competing countries into different pots based on voting patterns from previous contests, with countries with favourable voting histories put into the same pot. Greece was scheduled for the first half of the second semi-final. The draw, broadcast live on the official Eurovision Song Contest YouTube channel, was also aired by ERT via its streaming platform ERTflix. The shows' producers then decided the running order for the semi-finals; Greece was set to perform in position 3.

In Greece, all shows were aired on ERT 1, with commentary provided by Thanasis Alevras and Jérôme Kaluta, as well as on the radio station Second Programme, with commentary provided by Dimitris Meidanis. The televised shows are preceded by a special Eurovision Night broadcast, hosted by Jenny Melita.

=== Performance ===
Satti took part in technical rehearsals on 29 April and 2 May, followed by dress rehearsals on 8 and 9 May. Her performance of "Zari" at the contest is staged by Fokas Evangelinos (who has worked on various entries in previous contests, including the winning performances of Greece in 2005 and Russia in 2008) and choreographed by Mecnun Giasar. She is accompanied on stage by four dancers, namely Hüseyin "Hüso" Çetintaş, Yasin "Yasin AO" Ametoglou, Vasilis Karayiannis and Eirini Damianidou, and backing vocals are provided by Erasmia Markidi. Notably, the first two minutes of the performance are a single continuous shot.

=== Semi-final ===
Greece performed in position 3, following the entry from Albania and before the entry from Switzerland. At the end of the show, the country was announced as a qualifier for the final. It was later revealed that Greece placed fifth out of the sixteen participating countries in the second semi-final with 86 points.

=== Final ===
Following the semi-final, Greece was drawn to perform in the first half of the final. Greece performed in position 12, following the entry from Latvia and before the entry from the United Kingdom. Marina Satti once again took part in dress rehearsals on 10 and 11 May before the final, including the jury final where the professional juries cast their final votes before the live show on 11 May. She performed a repeat of her semi-final performance during the final on 11 May. Greece placed eleventh in the final, scoring 126 points; 85 points from the public televoting and 41 points from the juries.

=== Voting ===
Below is a breakdown of points awarded to and by Greece in the second semi-final and in the final. Voting during the three shows involved each country awarding points ranging from 1 to 12, excluding 9 and 11. In the finals voting, one set of points was given by the country's jury and another by televoting, while the semi-final vote was based entirely on the public vote. The Greek jury consisted of Panagiotis Biniaris, Georgia Fotou, Vasiliki Karatzoglou, Stamatina Kostiani, and Anastasios Rosopoulos. In the second semi-final, Greece placed fifth with 86 points, receiving maximum 12 points from Armenia. In the final, Greece placed 11th with 126 points, receiving 12 points from Switzerland in the jury vote and from Cyprus in the televote. Over the course of the contest, Greece awarded its 12 points to the Netherlands in the second semi-final, and to Switzerland (jury) and Cyprus (televote) in the final. ERT appointed Helena Paparizou, who won the 2005 contest for Greece, as its spokesperson to announce the Greek jury's votes in the final.

==== Points awarded to Greece ====
Points awarded to Greece (Semi-final 2)
Score	Televote
12 points	Armenia
10 points	
8 points	Albania; Belgium; Switzerland
7 points	
6 points	Georgia; Italy; Malta; Netherlands
5 points	Rest of the World; Spain
4 points	Czechia; France
3 points	Israel
2 points	Austria; Denmark
1 point	Norway

Points awarded to Greece (Final)
Score	Televote	Jury
12 points	Cyprus	Switzerland
10 points	Armenia	
8 points	Serbia	
7 points	San Marino	Albania; Cyprus
6 points		
5 points	Germany; Luxembourg	
4 points	Albania; Belgium; Netherlands; Switzerland	Armenia; France
3 points	Australia; Moldova; Rest of the World	Serbia
2 points	Czechia; Georgia; Italy; Malta; Spain	Norway; Slovenia
1 point	Azerbaijan; France; United Kingdom	

==== Points awarded by Greece ====
Points awarded by Greece (Semi-final 2)
Score	Televote
12 points	Netherlands
10 points	Israel
8 points	Armenia
7 points	Switzerland
6 points	Georgia
5 points	Albania
4 points	Austria
3 points	Malta
2 points	Estonia
1 point	Belgium

Points awarded by Greece (Final)
Score	Televote	Jury
12 points	Cyprus	Switzerland
10 points	France	Cyprus
8 points	Switzerland	Italy
7 points	Israel	France
6 points	Croatia	Portugal
5 points	Armenia	Germany
4 points	Italy	Armenia
3 points	Ukraine	Luxembourg
2 points	Ireland	Ukraine
1 point	Sweden	Sweden

==== Detailed voting results ====
Each participating broadcaster assembles a five-member jury panel consisting of music industry professionals who are citizens of the country they represent. Each jury, and individual jury member, is required to meet a strict set of criteria regarding professional background, as well as diversity in gender and age. No member of a national jury was permitted to be related in any way to any of the competing acts in such a way that they cannot vote impartially and independently.

The following members comprised the Greek jury:

- Panagiotis Biniaris
- Georgia Fotou
- Vasiliki Karatzoglou
- Stamatina Kostiani
- Anastasios Rosopoulos

Detailed voting results from Greece (Semi-final 2)
R/O	Country	Televote	
R/O	Country	Rank	Points
01	Malta	8	3
02	Albania	6	5
03	Greece		
04	Switzerland	4	7
05	Czechia	12	
06	Austria	7	4
07	Denmark	11	
08	Armenia	3	8
09	Latvia	13	
10	San Marino	15	
11	Georgia	5	6
12	Belgium	10	1
13	Estonia	9	2
14	Israel	2	10
15	Norway	14	
16	Netherlands	1	12

Detailed voting results from Greece (Final)
R/O	Country	Jury							Televote	
R/O	Country	Juror A	Juror B	Juror C	Juror D	Juror E	Rank	Points	Rank	Points
01	Sweden	8	9	9	9	16	10	1	10	1
02	Ukraine	19	24	16	20	1	9	2	8	3
03	Germany	10	6	10	4	13	6	5	21	
04	Luxembourg	6	12	7	8	10	8	3	14	
~~05~~	~~Netherlands~~ ‡ (Note: The Netherlands was disqualified prior to the final.)	~~15~~	~~11~~	~~6~~	~~12~~	~~11~~	~~12~~		N/A	
06	Israel	17	25	23	18	14	22		4	7
07	Lithuania	16	15	20	14	21	18		18	
08	Spain	22	20	19	22	25	24		12	
09	Estonia	20	22	18	11	24	19		15	
10	Ireland	25	23	24	24	23	25		9	2
11	Latvia	11	13	11	25	7	13		16	
12	Greece									
13	United Kingdom	14	5	21	16	22	15		23	
14	Norway	9	19	14	13	20	16		20	
15	Italy	4	4	1	5	4	3	8	7	4
16	Serbia	18	8	13	17	5	11		19	
17	Finland	24	21	25	23	12	23		17	
18	Portugal	5	7	3	3	8	5	6	22	
19	Armenia	7	17	8	6	6	7	4	6	5
20	Cyprus	1	1	2	2	18	2	10	1	12
21	Switzerland	3	2	4	1	2	1	12	3	8
22	Slovenia	13	18	22	21	17	20		24	
23	Croatia	12	10	12	15	9	14		5	6
24	Georgia	23	16	17	19	15	21		11	
25	France	2	3	5	7	3	4	7	2	10
26	Austria	21	14	15	10	19	17		13	
