= Austria in the Eurovision Song Contest 2024 =

- Eurovision Song Contest 2024
- Participating broadcaster: Österreichischer Rundfunk (ORF)
- Country: Austria
- Selection process: Internal selection
- Announcement date: Artist: 16 January 2024; Song: 1 March 2024

Competing entry
- Song: "We Will Rave"
- Artist: Kaleen
- Songwriters: Anderz Wrethov; Jimmy "Joker" Thörnfeldt; Julie Aagaard; Thomas Stengaard

Placement
- Semi-final result: Qualified (9th, 46 points)
- Final result: 24th, 24 points

Participation chronology

Austria was represented at the Eurovision Song Contest 2024 with the song "We Will Rave", written by Anderz Wrethov, Jimmy Thörnfeldt, Julie Aagaard, and Thomas Stengaard, and performed by Kaleen. The Austrian participating broadcaster, Österreichischer Rundfunk (ORF), internally selected its entry for the contest. Kaleen was announced as the Austrian representative on 16 January 2024, whilst the selected song was officially presented on 1 March 2024.

Austria was drawn to compete in the second semi-final of the Eurovision Song Contest which took place on 9 May 2024. Performing during the show in position 6, "We Will Rave" was announced among the top 10 entries of the second semi-final and therefore qualified to compete in the final, marking Austria's second consecutive qualification to the final. It was later revealed that Austria placed ninth out of the 16 participating countries in the semi-final with 46 points. Performing in position 26 in the final on 11 May 2024, Austria finished in twenty-fourth place overall with 24 points.

== Background ==
Prior to the 2024 contest, Österreichischer Rundfunk (ORF) had participated in the Eurovision Song Contest representing Austria fifty-five times since its first entry in 1957. It had won the contest on two occasions: in 1966 with the song "Merci, Chérie" performed by Udo Jürgens and in 2014 with the song "Rise Like a Phoenix" performed by Conchita Wurst. Following the introduction of semi-finals for the 2004 contest, Austria had featured in only eight finals. Its least successful result had been last place, which it had achieved on eight occasions, most recently in 2012. It had also received nul points on four occasions; in 1962, 1988, 1991, and 2015.

As part of its duties as participating broadcaster, ORF organises the selection of its entry in the Eurovision Song Contest and broadcasts the event in the country. In 2014 and since 2017, ORF had held an internal selection to choose the artist and song to represent Austria at the contest. On 14 June 2023, ORF's program director Stefanie Groiss-Horowitz confirmed the broadcaster's intentions to participate at the 2024 contest and to continue to internally select its representative.

== Before Eurovision ==
=== Internal selection ===
In July 2023, ORF scouts Peter Schreiber and Eberhard Forcher (who had worked on the selection of Austrian entries since 2016) started making open calls for interested artists to contact them by 30 September 2023, receiving more than sixty entries by that date. An expert committee, headed by Forcher, shortlisted fourteen artists, who were invited to the ORF headquarters in Vienna in order to shoot videoclips for their songs and were ultimately assessed by a 25-member jury and six Eurovision Song Contest fan clubs at an audition round. In early September 2023, ORF's head of entertainment Martin Gastinger had commented on the possibility of holding a national final or a public online vote among the shortlisted finalists rather than a fully internal selection; however, this was later reconsidered for "legal reasons", with the selected performer planned to be announced in December 2023; this was ultimately not the case and the announcement was scheduled for 16 January 2024, during the Ö3-Wecker show on Hitradio Ö3. The selected artist was revealed to be Kaleen; she had previous experience in the contest, having worked as a stand-in singer, dancer, creative director and choreographer for various countries since 2018. Her competing entry, "We Will Rave", was released on 1 March; written by Anderz Wrethov, Jimmy Thörnfeldt, Julie Aagaard and Thomas Stengaard, it had been anticipated that it would be a "techno-inspired pop track".

=== Promotion ===
As part of the promotion of her participation in the contest, Kaleen attended the PrePartyES in Madrid on 30 March 2024, the London Eurovision Party on 7 April 2024, the Eurovision in Concert event in Amsterdam on 13 April 2024, the Nordic Eurovision Party in Stockholm on 14 April 2024 and the Copenhagen Eurovision Party (Malmöhagen) on 4 May 2024. She also performed at a special "farewell party" in Vienna on 22 April 2024, organised and streamed online by ORF and Eurovision fansite Wiwibloggs, and she performed at the Eurovision Village in Malmö on 7 May 2024.

== At Eurovision ==
The Eurovision Song Contest 2024 took place at the Malmö Arena in Malmö, Sweden, and consisted of two semi-finals held on the respective dates of 7 and 9 May and the final on 11 May 2024. All nations with the exceptions of the host country and the "Big Five" (France, Germany, Italy, Spain and the United Kingdom) were required to qualify from one of two semi-finals in order to compete in the final; the top ten countries from each semi-final progress to the final. On 30 January 2024, an allocation draw was held to determine which of the two semi-finals, as well as which half of the show, each country would perform in; the European Broadcasting Union (EBU) split up the competing countries into different pots based on voting patterns from previous contests, with countries with favourable voting histories put into the same pot. Austria was scheduled for the first half of the second semi-final. The shows' producers then decided the running order for the semi-finals; Austria was set to perform in position 6.

In Austria, all the shows were aired on ORF 1, with commentary by Andi Knoll, and the final on FM4, with commentary by Jan Böhmermann and Olli Schulz. In a joint meeting held in Munich in September 2023, ORF and German-language broadcasters ARD for Germany and SRF for Switzerland renewed their plans to cooperate on the broadcast of Eurovision-themed programmes ESC – Der Countdown and ESC – Die Aftershow in 2024, as they did for the 2023 contest; the shows are hosted by Barbara Schöneberger.

=== Performance ===
Kaleen took part in technical rehearsals on 29 April and 2 May, followed by dress rehearsals on 8 and 9 May. Her performance of "We Will Rave" at the contest is directed by Dan Shipton and choreographed by herself alongside Lukas McFarlane.

=== Semi-final ===
Austria performed in position 6, following the entry from Czechia and before the entry from Denmark. At the end of the show, the country was announced as a qualifier for the final.

=== Final ===
Following the semi-final, Austria was drawn to perform in the second half of the final, and performed last in position 26 as the 25th act, following the entry from France. During the dance break, a battery failure on the Steadicam caused a 3.8-second freeze frame.

=== Voting ===
Below is a breakdown of points awarded to Austria in the second semi-final and in the final. Voting during the three shows involved each country awarding sets of points from 1-8, 10 and 12: one from their professional jury and the other from televoting in the final vote, while the semi-final vote was based entirely on the vote of the public. The Austrian jury consisted of Pia Maria Ausserlechner, Philipp Emberger, Anna-Sophie Heibl, Simone Lewarth and Annemarie Reisinger-Treiber. In the second semi-final, Austria placed 9th with 46 points, while in the final, Austria placed 24th with 24 points. Over the course of the contest, Austria awarded its 12 points to the Netherlands in the second semi-final, and to Switzerland and Croatia in the jury vote and televote in the final respectively.

ORF appointed Philipp Hansa as its spokesperson to announce the Austrian jury's votes in the final.

==== Points awarded to Austria ====
Points awarded to Austria (Semi-final 2)
Score	Televote
12 points	
10 points	
8 points	Israel
7 points	
6 points	
5 points	
4 points	Albania; Armenia; Greece; Switzerland
3 points	Denmark; Estonia; Malta; Spain
2 points	Czechia; Latvia; Netherlands; Norway
1 point	Belgium; Georgia

Points awarded to Austria (Final)
Score	Televote	Jury
12 points		
10 points		
8 points		
7 points		Israel
6 points		Spain
5 points		Italy
4 points		
3 points	Israel	
2 points	Finland	
1 point		Sweden

==== Points awarded by Austria ====
Points awarded by Austria (Semi-final 2)
Score	Televote
12 points	Netherlands
10 points	Israel
8 points	Switzerland
7 points	Estonia
6 points	Armenia
5 points	Czechia
4 points	Latvia
3 points	Denmark
2 points	Greece
1 point	Georgia

Points awarded by Austria (Final)
Score	Televote	Jury
12 points	Croatia	Switzerland
10 points	Israel	Italy
8 points	Switzerland	Croatia
7 points	Ukraine	Armenia
6 points	France	Ukraine
5 points	Serbia	France
4 points	Germany	Spain
3 points	Armenia	Ireland
2 points	Ireland	Estonia
1 point	Italy	Norway

==== Detailed voting results ====
Each participating broadcaster assembles a five-member jury panel consisting of music industry professionals who are citizens of the country they represent. Each jury, and individual jury member, is required to meet a strict set of criteria regarding professional background, as well as diversity in gender and age. No member of a national jury was permitted to be related in any way to any of the competing acts in such a way that they cannot vote impartially and independently. The individual rankings of each jury member as well as the nation's televoting results were released shortly after the grand final.

The following members comprised the Austrian jury:

- Pia Maria Ausserlechner
- Philipp Emberger
- Anna-Sophie Heibl
- Simone Lewarth
- Annemarie Reisinger-Treiber

Detailed voting results from Austria (Semi-final 2)
R/O	Country	Televote	
R/O	Country	Rank	Points
01	Malta	12	
02	Albania	14	
03	Greece	9	2
04	Switzerland	3	8
05	Czechia	6	5
06	Austria		
07	Denmark	8	3
08	Armenia	5	6
09	Latvia	7	4
10	San Marino	13	
11	Georgia	10	1
12	Belgium	15	
13	Estonia	4	7
14	Israel	2	10
15	Norway	11	
16	Netherlands	1	12

Detailed voting results from Austria (Final)
R/O	Country	Jury							Televote	
R/O	Country	Juror A	Juror B	Juror C	Juror D	Juror E	Rank	Points	Rank	Points
01	Sweden	12	5	14	20	7	12		17	
02	Ukraine	5	10	6	5	11	6	6	4	7
03	Germany	11	4	20	15	12	13		7	4
04	Luxembourg	23	12	21	11	14	19		20	
~~05~~	~~Netherlands~~ ‡ (Note: The Netherlands was disqualified prior to the final.)	~~7~~	~~6~~	~~3~~	~~7~~	~~10~~	~~4~~		N/A	
06	Israel	10	16	16	10	18	18		2	10
07	Lithuania	14	11	5	17	16	14		18	
08	Spain	4	20	9	16	3	8	4	14	
09	Estonia	8	13	12	8	4	10	2	12	
10	Ireland	13	18	7	2	19	9	3	9	2
11	Latvia	20	14	24	25	15	22		15	
12	Greece	18	8	22	14	8	16		13	
13	United Kingdom	16	22	13	24	13	20		23	
14	Norway	19	25	11	21	1	11	1	21	
15	Italy	3	2	2	12	17	2	10	10	1
16	Serbia	21	19	25	18	24	24		6	5
17	Finland	15	24	17	9	6	15		11	
18	Portugal	17	15	23	6	21	17		24	
19	Armenia	6	3	10	4	20	5	7	8	3
20	Cyprus	22	23	15	23	23	23		16	
21	Switzerland	1	1	1	1	2	1	12	3	8
22	Slovenia	25	21	19	22	22	25		22	
23	Croatia	2	7	4	19	5	3	8	1	12
24	Georgia	24	17	18	13	25	21		19	
25	France	9	9	8	3	9	7	5	5	6
26	Austria									
