= Nutsa Buzaladze =

Georgian singer and songwriter (born 1997)

Nutsa Buzaladze ნუცა ბუზალაძე
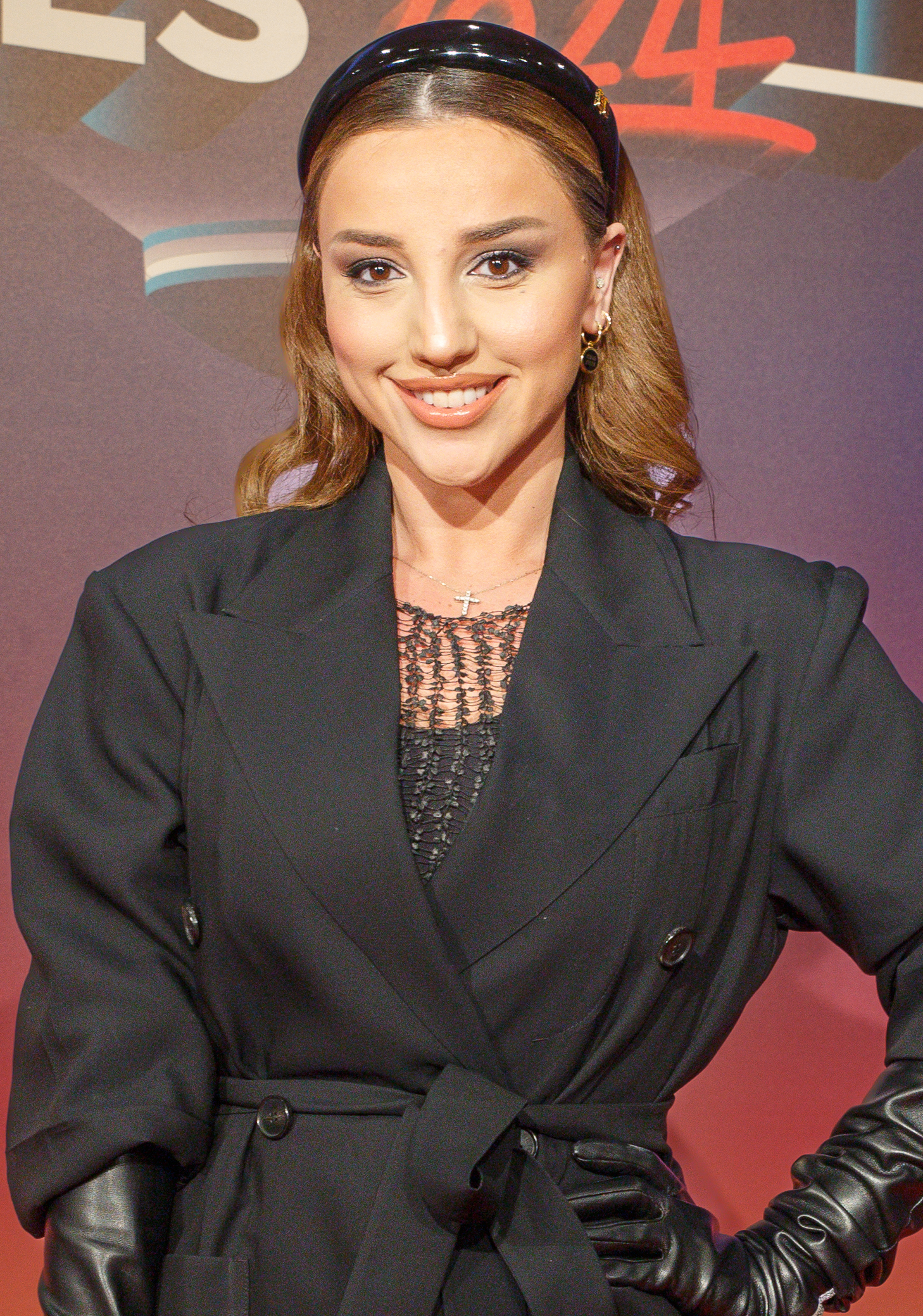
- Buzaladze in 2024

Background information
- Also known as: Nutsa
- Born: 28 January 1997 (age 29); Tbilisi, Georgia
- Genre: Popular
- Occupations: Singer; Songwriter
- Instrument: Singing
- Years active: 2011–Present
- Website: nutsaofficial.com

Nutsa Buzaladze (Note: Georgian: ნუცა ბუზალაძე, romanized: Nutsa Buzaladze, IPA: [ˈnutsʰa ˈbuzaladze].) (born 28 January 1997), also known simply as Nutsa, is a Georgian singer and songwriter. She represented Georgia in the Eurovision Song Contest 2024 with the song "Firefighter".

== Early and personal life ==
Buzaladze was born in Tbilisi but grew up in Turkey. Since the age of 5, she performed as part of a children's group, and was later the lead vocalist and guitarist of another ensemble. She began taking piano lessons at the age of 8.

Buzaladze has lived in Los Angeles, where she gained musical experience, and Dubai, which is her permanent residence as of 2024.

== Career ==
Buzaladze began her solo career in 2011, when she competed in Georgia's Got Talent. In 2014, she garnered international attention as she represented Georgia in the New Wave Music Festival held in Jūrmala, Latvia, which she won. During the following years, she competed in The Voice of Turkey, Two Stars Georgia and the Georgian versions of Your Face Sounds Familiar and Dancing with the Stars. She has collaborated with Turkish singer Hadise, who also acted as her coach in The Voice of Turkey.

In 2017, Buzaladze released the song "White Horses Run", with which she placed second in the Georgian selection for the Eurovision Song Contest 2017. In 2019, Buzaladze released her debut album Nutsa22, containing covers of Georgian songs and original English-language compositions; this was followed by her breakthrough hit "Gelodebi". Shortly after, she released a successful single in Russia.

In 2020 and 2021, she took part in All Together Now Russia. She performed at the Expo 2020 in Dubai, as well as at the Dubai National Theatre and the Dubai Opera. She competed in the "International Artists" category in the Albanian song competition Kënga Magjike 2021, where she came 1st. She participated in the 21st season of American Idol in 2023, credited mononymously as Nutsa, finishing in the top 12. She returned for the season's finale as a guest performer, joining Lionel Richie alongside the rest of the top 12 for a performance of his song "Sail On", and performed a duet of the song "Can't Get You Out of My Head" with Kylie Minogue.

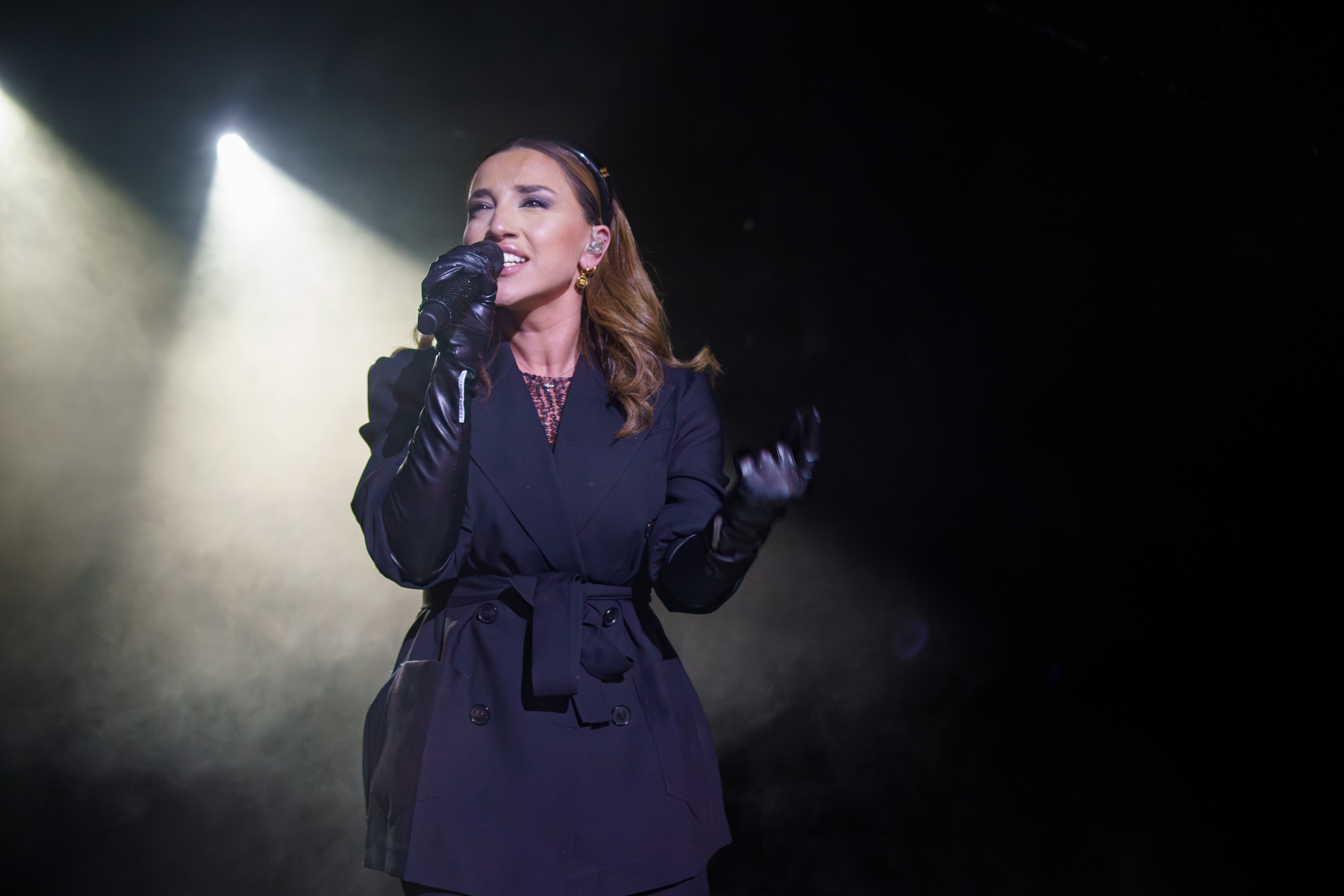
Nutsa Buzaladze performing in Madrid during PrePartyES 2024

On 12 January 2024, she was announced as the Georgian representative for the Eurovision Song Contest 2024 in Malmö, Sweden. Her song was later revealed to be titled "Firefighter" was released on 11 March 2024. Nutsa qualified from the second semi-final at Eurovision on 9 May 2024. This marks the first time Georgia qualified for the Grand Final since 2016. In the Grand Final, she finished in 21st place with 34 points.

== Political views and criticism ==
Buzaladze has endorsed Georgia's ruling party Georgian Dream, which in recent years has promoted anti-Western narratives and baseless claims about a "Global War Party" attempting to embroil Georgia in the Russian-Ukrainian War. During the 2024 Georgian parliamentary election, Buzaladze stated that she is "proud" to support the party and that she has been performing and campaigning for them for years.[10]

After the Georgian Dream ruling party engaged in widespread violence and torture against protesters disputing the election results, Buzaladze stated that she condemns "any type of violence against peaceful citizens, law enforcement, journalists, or people with different views". However, in January 2025 Buzaladze again attracted controversy by continuing to participate in ruling party sponsored concerts. During her appearance in Batumi, she was confronted by protesters with pictures of people beaten and tortured by pro-government forces. Buzaladze responded by yelling at protesters from the stage, stating "If you think this will ruin my concert today and rob us of the New Year, you are very mistaken." Buzaladze also made baseless claims that protesters were being paid and sarcastically told them to "enjoy" the money they were supposedly given.

Earlier in 2023, Buzaladze came under heavy criticism in Georgia because of her performance in Russia, which still occupies parts of Georgia. She was subsequently boycotted by several Georgian radios. Buzaladze had to publicly apologize, even though some ruling party officials rushed to her defense.

== Discography ==
=== Extended plays ===
Title	Details
Nutsa22	Released: 1 May 2019; Formats: Digital download, streaming

=== Singles ===
Title	Year	Peak chart positions	Album or EP
Title	Year	LTU	Album or EP
"White Horses Run"	2017	—	Nutsa22
"Nu mousmen"	2019	—	Non-album singles
"Ertad gvinda"	2019	—	Non-album singles
"Gelodebi"	2019	—	Non-album singles
"Guls rom ukvarde"	2019	—	Non-album singles
"Tetri ghame"	2020	—	Non-album singles
"Gatendes"	2021	—	Non-album singles
"Net"	2021	—	Non-album singles
"We Are One"	2021	—	Non-album singles
"Sul es aris"	2021	—	Non-album singles
"You Broke My Heart"	2021	—	Non-album singles
"Let U Go"	2022	—	Non-album singles
"Alive"	2023	—	Non-album singles
"L.O.V.E"	2023	—	Non-album singles
"Firefighter"	2024	90	Non-album singles
"Mother's Love"	2024	—	Non-album singles
"Together Forever"	2024	—	Non-album singles
"—" denotes a recording that did not chart or was not released in that territory.

== Notes ==
Awards and achievements
Preceded by Iru with "Echo"	Georgia in the Eurovision Song Contest; 2024	Succeeded by Mariam Shengelia with "Freedom"
