= Armenia in the Eurovision Song Contest 2024 =

- Eurovision Song Contest 2024
- Participating broadcaster: Public Television of Armenia (AMPTV)
- Country: Armenia
- Selection process: Internal selection
- Announcement date: Artist: 9 March 2024; Song: 13 March 2024

Competing entry
- Song: "Jako"
- Artist: Ladaniva
- Songwriters: Audrey Leclercq; Jaklin Baghdasaryan; Louis Thomas

Placement
- Semi-final result: Qualified (3rd, 137 points)
- Final result: 8th, 183 points

Participation chronology

Armenia was represented at the Eurovision Song Contest 2024 with the song "Jako", written by Audrey Leclercq, Jaklin Baghdasaryan, and Louis Thomas, and performed by Baghdasaryan and Thomas themselves as Ladaniva. The Armenian participating broadcaster, Public Television of Armenia (AMPTV), internally selected its entry for the contest.

Armenia was drawn to compete in the second semi-final of the Eurovision Song Contest which took place on 9 May 2024 and was later selected to perform in position 8. At the end of the show, "Jako" was announced among the top 10 entries of the second semi-final and hence qualified to compete in the final, marking a third consecutive qualification to the final for the country. It was later revealed that Armenia placed third out of the sixteen participating countries in the semi-final with 137 points. In the final, Armenia performed in position 19 and placed eighth out of the 25 performing countries, scoring a total of 183 points. This secured Armenia its first top ten result since 2016.

== Background ==
Prior to the 2024 contest, Public Television of Armenia (AMPTV) had participated in the Eurovision Song Contest representing Armenia fifteen times since its first entry in 2006. Its highest placing in the contest, to this point, had been fourth place, achieved on two occasions: in 2008 with the song "Qélé, Qélé" performed by Sirusho and in 2014 with the song "Not Alone" performed by Aram Mp3. It had, to this point, failed to qualify to the final on three occasions, namely in 2011, 2018, and 2019. AMPTV briefly withdrew from the contest on two occasions: in 2012 due to long-standing tensions with then-host country Azerbaijan, and in 2021 due to social and political crises in the aftermath of the Second Nagorno-Karabakh War. In 2023, the entry "Future Lover" performed by Brunette qualified for the final and placed 14th overall with 122 points.

As part of its duties as participating broadcaster, AMPTV organises the selection of its entry in the Eurovision Song Contest and broadcasts the event in the country. It had used various methods to select its entry in the past, such as internal selections and a live televised national final to choose the performer, song or both to compete at Eurovision. AMPTV confirmed its intention to participate in the 2024 contest on 5 December 2023.

== Before Eurovision ==
=== Internal selection ===
AMPTV internally selected its entry for the Eurovision Song Contest 2024. In January 2024, French-Armenian music duo Ladaniva was reported as the selected act by local and international media. On 9 March 2024, the broadcaster officially confirmed the duo as the Armenian entrant for the 2024 contest, with the entry, "Jako", revealed on 13 March.

=== Promotion ===
As part of the promotion of their participation in the contest, Ladaniva attended the PrePartyES in Madrid on 30 March 2024. In addition, they performed at the Eurovision Village in Malmö on 4 May 2024.

== At Eurovision ==
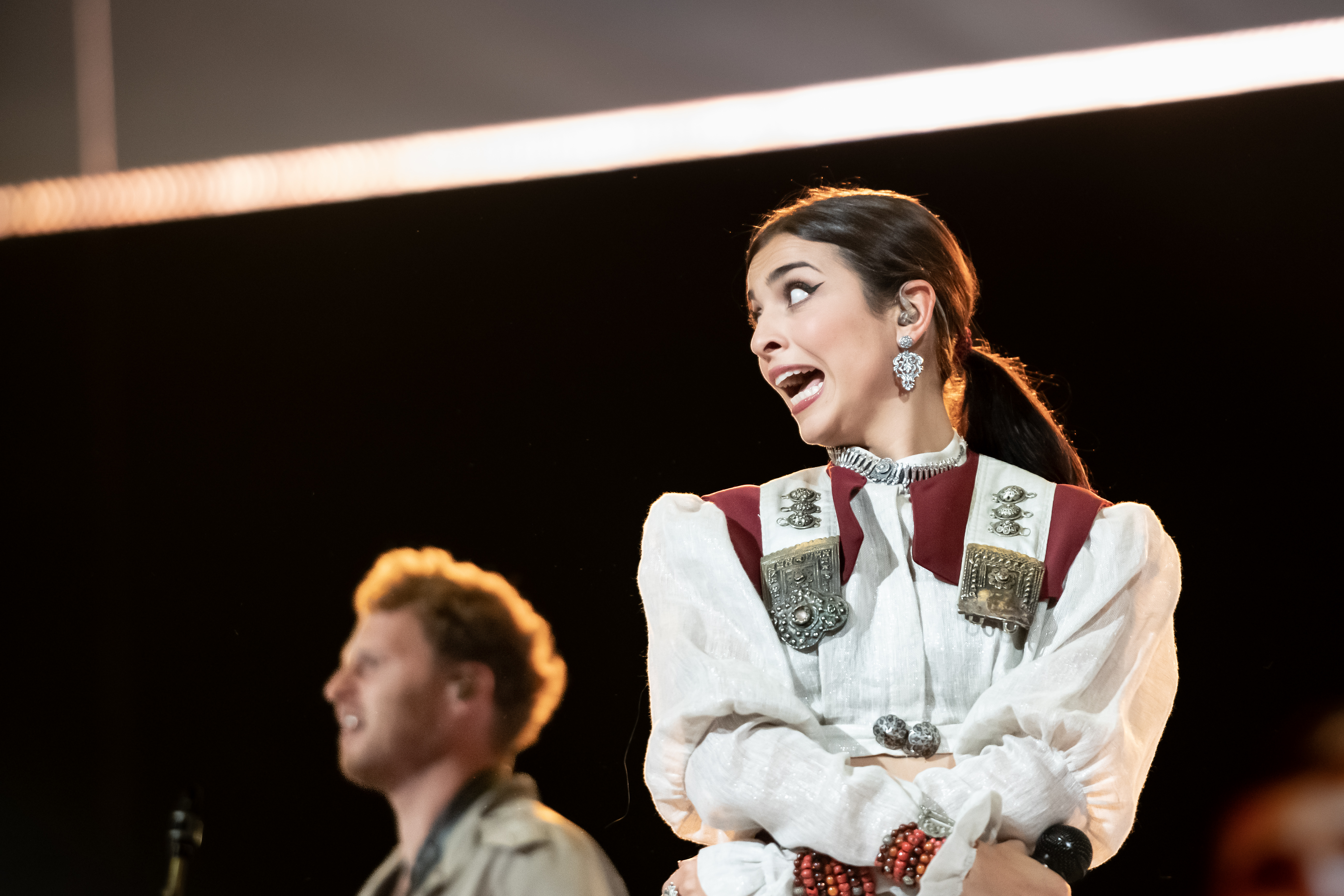
Jaklin Baghdasaryan of Ladaniva during a rehearsal before the second semi-final.

The Eurovision Song Contest 2024 took place at the Malmö Arena in Malmö, Sweden, and consisted of two semi-finals held on the respective dates of 7 and 9 May and the final on 11 May 2024. All nations with the exceptions of the host country and the "Big Five" (France, Germany, Italy, Spain and the United Kingdom) were required to qualify from one of two semi-finals in order to compete in the final; the top ten countries from each semi-final progressed to the final. On 30 January 2024, an allocation draw was held to determine which of the two semi-finals, as well as which half of the show, each country would perform in; the European Broadcasting Union (EBU) split up the competing countries into different pots based on voting patterns from previous contests, with countries with favourable voting histories put into the same pot. Armenia was scheduled for the first half of the second semi-final. The shows' producers then decided the running order for the semi-finals; Armenia was set to perform in position 8.

In Armenia, all three shows were broadcast on First Channel, with commentary by Hrachuhi Utmazyan and Sevak Hakobyan.

=== Performance ===
Ladaniva took part in technical rehearsals on 29 April and 2 May, followed by dress rehearsals on 8 and 9 May. Their performance of "Jako" at the contest is staged by Arthur Manukyan, the director of the music video, who has previously worked in analogous positions on various past Eurovision entries for Armenia, including 2017, 2018, 2019 and 2020, as well as Junior Eurovision entries in 2014, 2015 and 2021. Similarly to the video, the duo and the accompanying band perform wearing Armenian traditional clothing, with chickens being an artistic theme on stage throughout the act.

=== Semi-final ===
Armenia performed in position 8, following the entry from Denmark and before the entry from Latvia. At the end of the show, the country was announced as a qualifier for the final. It was later revealed that Armenia placed third out of the sixteen participating countries in the second semi-final with 137 points.

=== Final ===
Following the semi-final, Armenia drew "producer's choice" for the final, meaning that the country would perform in the half decided by the contest's producers. Armenia performed position 19, following the entry from Portugal and before the entry from Cyprus. Ladaniva once again took part in dress rehearsals on 10 and 11 May before the final, including the jury final where the professional juries cast their final votes before the live show on 11 May. They performed a repeat of their semi-final performance during the final on 11 May. Armenia placed eighth in the final, scoring 183 points; 82 points from the public televoting and 101 points from the juries. This marked Armenia's highest placing since 2016.

=== Voting ===
Below is a breakdown of points awarded to Armenia in the second semi-final and in the final. Voting during the three shows involved each country awarding sets of points from 1-8, 10 and 12: one from their professional jury and the other from televoting in the final vote, while the semi-final vote was based entirely on the vote of the public. The Armenian jury consisted of Lilit Arakelyan, Naira Gyurjinyan, Aramayis Hayrapetyan, Robert Koloyan and Nare Manukyan. In the second semi-final, Armenia placed 3rd with 137 points, receiving maximum twelve points from Georgia and Israel. This marked a third consecutive qualification to the final. In the final, Armenia placed 8th with 183 points. Over the course of the contest, Armenia awarded its 12 points to Greece in the second semi-final, and to France in both the jury vote and televote in the final.

AMPTV appointed Brunette, who represented Armenia in the 2023 contest, as its spokesperson to announce the Armenian jury's votes in the final.

==== Points awarded to Armenia ====
Points awarded to Armenia (Semi-final 2)
Score	Televote
12 points	Georgia; Israel
10 points	France; Netherlands
8 points	Greece; Rest of the World; San Marino (Note: San Marino uses a jury in the semi-finals.)
7 points	Czechia; Italy; Spain
6 points	Albania; Austria; Belgium; Switzerland
5 points	Denmark; Latvia; Malta; Norway
4 points	Estonia
3 points	
2 points	
1 point	

Points awarded to Armenia (Final)
Score	Televote	Jury
12 points		
10 points	France; Georgia	
8 points		Albania; Portugal; San Marino
7 points		Austria; Germany; Latvia; Norway; Slovenia
6 points	Israel	Czechia; France; Georgia
5 points	Belgium; Czechia; Greece; Rest of the World	Iceland
4 points	Cyprus; Germany; Italy	Greece; Switzerland
3 points	Austria; Croatia; Netherlands; Spain	Denmark; Italy; Netherlands
2 points	Latvia; Portugal; Sweden	Luxembourg
1 point	Albania; Australia; Moldova; Serbia; Switzerland; Ukraine	

==== Points awarded by Armenia ====
Points awarded by Armenia (Semi-final 2)
Score	Televote
12 points	Greece
10 points	Georgia
8 points	Netherlands
7 points	Switzerland
6 points	Israel
5 points	Malta
4 points	Austria
3 points	Denmark
2 points	Estonia
1 point	Czechia

Points awarded by Armenia (Final)
Score	Televote	Jury
12 points	France	France
10 points	Greece	Portugal
8 points	Switzerland	Italy
7 points	Croatia	Switzerland
6 points	Italy	Croatia
5 points	Georgia	Serbia
4 points	Cyprus	Greece
3 points	Ukraine	Georgia
2 points	Ireland	Cyprus
1 point	Israel	Germany

==== Detailed voting results ====
Each participating broadcaster assembles a five-member jury panel consisting of music industry professionals who are citizens of the country they represent. Each jury, and individual jury member, is required to meet a strict set of criteria regarding professional background, as well as diversity in gender and age. No member of a national jury was permitted to be related in any way to any of the competing acts in such a way that they cannot vote impartially and independently. The individual rankings of each jury member as well as the nation's televoting results were released shortly after the grand final.

The following members comprised the Armenian jury:

- Lilit Arakelyan
- Naira Gyurjinyan
- Aramayis Hayrapetyan
- Robert Koloyan
- Nare Manukyan

Detailed voting results from Armenia (Semi-final 2)
R/O	Country	Televote	
R/O	Country	Rank	Points
01	Malta	6	5
02	Albania	15	
03	Greece	1	12
04	Switzerland	4	7
05	Czechia	10	1
06	Austria	7	4
07	Denmark	8	3
08	Armenia		
09	Latvia	12	
10	San Marino	14	
11	Georgia	2	10
12	Belgium	11	
13	Estonia	9	2
14	Israel	5	6
15	Norway	13	
16	Netherlands	3	8

Detailed voting results from Armenia (Final)
R/O	Country	Jury							Televote	
R/O	Country	Juror A	Juror B	Juror C	Juror D	Juror E	Rank	Points	Rank	Points
01	Sweden	11	13	16	5	11	12		15	
02	Ukraine	7	14	21	13	12	13		8	3
03	Germany	9	12	19	3	13	10	1	11	
04	Luxembourg	17	16	7	15	15	14		13	
~~05~~	~~Netherlands~~ ‡ (Note: The Netherlands was disqualified prior to the final.)	~~19~~	~~23~~	~~18~~	~~24~~	~~20~~	~~23~~		N/A	
06	Israel	24	11	25	22	7	15		10	1
07	Lithuania	22	15	20	18	21	22		14	
08	Spain	20	24	22	21	22	24		18	
09	Estonia	18	18	15	23	17	20		16	
10	Ireland	25	25	23	25	25	25		9	2
11	Latvia	23	20	17	14	19	21		17	
12	Greece	12	5	11	6	8	7	4	2	10
13	United Kingdom	15	21	13	9	23	17		23	
14	Norway	14	17	9	16	18	16		20	
15	Italy	6	2	2	7	2	3	8	5	6
16	Serbia	16	6	6	8	6	6	5	24	
17	Finland	8	22	24	19	24	18		21	
18	Portugal	5	3	3	2	3	2	10	19	
19	Armenia									
20	Cyprus	10	7	12	12	5	9	2	7	4
21	Switzerland	1	4	8	4	4	4	7	3	8
22	Slovenia	21	19	14	20	14	19		22	
23	Croatia	3	9	4	10	16	5	6	4	7
24	Georgia	4	8	10	17	9	8	3	6	5
25	France	2	1	1	1	1	1	12	1	12
26	Austria	13	10	5	11	10	11		12	
