= Latvia in the Eurovision Song Contest 2024 =

- Eurovision Song Contest 2024
- Participating broadcaster: Latvian Television (LTV)
- Country: Latvia
- Selection process: Supernova 2024
- Selection date: Semi-final: 3 February 2024; Final: 10 February 2024

Competing entry
- Song: "Hollow"
- Artist: Dons
- Songwriters: Artūrs Šingirejs; Kate Northrop; Liam Geddes

Placement
- Semi-final result: Qualified (7th, 72 points)
- Final result: 16th, 64 points

Participation chronology

Latvia was represented at the Eurovision Song Contest 2024 with the song "Hollow", written by Artūrs Šingirejs, Kate Northrop, and Liam Geddes, and performed by Šingirejs himself under his stage name Dons. The Latvian participating broadcaster, Latvian Television (LTV), organised the national final Supernova 2024 in order to select its entry for the contest. Fifteen songs were selected to compete in the national final, which consisted of two shows: a semi-final and a final. In the semi-final on 3 February 2024, ten entries were selected to advance to compete in the final on 10 February 2024 where a public televote and an eight-member jury panel selected "Hollow" performed by Dons as the winner.

Latvia was drawn to compete in the second semi-final of the Eurovision Song Contest which took place on 9 May 2024 and was later selected to perform in position 9. At the end of the show, "Hollow" was announced among the top 10 entries of the second semi-final and hence qualified to compete in the final, marking Latvia's first qualification to the final since 2016. It was later revealed that Latvia placed seventh out of the sixteen participating countries in the semi-final with 72 points. In the final, Latvia performed in position 11 and placed sixteenth out of the 25 performing countries, scoring a total of 64 points.

== Background ==
Prior to 2024, Latvian Television (LTV) had participated in the Eurovision Song Contest representing Latvia 23 times since its first entry in 2000. It won the contest once in 2002 with the song "I Wanna" performed by Marie N. Following the introduction of semi-finals in 2004, it was able to qualify for the final between 2005 and 2008. Between 2009 and 2014, it failed to qualify to the final for six consecutive years before managing to qualify to the final in 2015 and 2016. It has failed to qualify to the final for six consecutive contests since 2017, including with its 2023 entry "Aijā" performed by Sudden Lights.

As part of its duties as participating broadcaster, LTV organises the selection of its entry in the Eurovision Song Contest and broadcasts the event in the country. Since 2015, it had selected its entries using the national final format Supernova. On 11 September 2023, LTV confirmed its intention to participate in the 2024 contest and to select its entry through Supernova.

== Before Eurovision ==
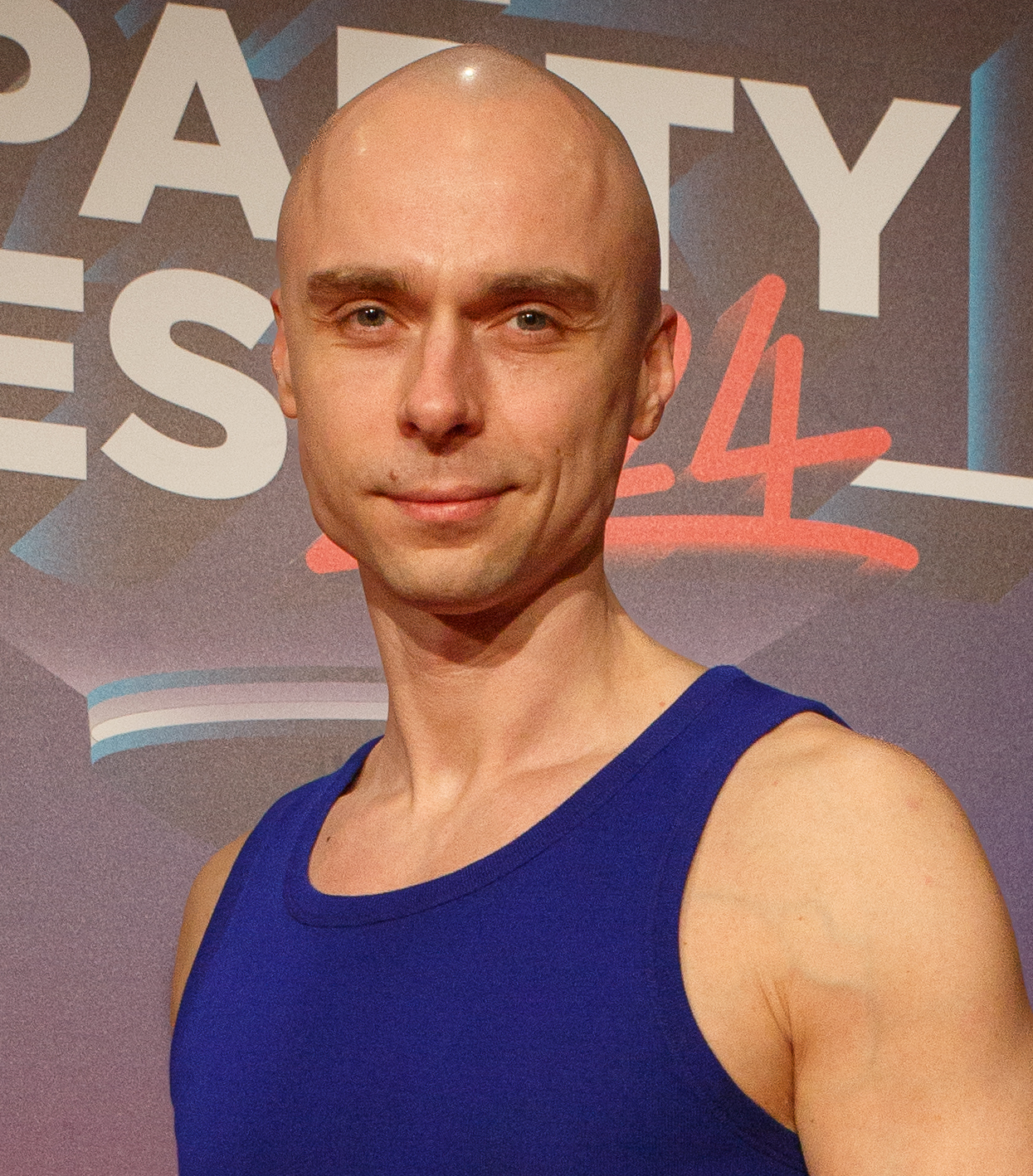
Dons, winner of Supernova 2024, at the PrePartyES event in Madrid

=== Supernova 2024 ===
Supernova 2024 was the ninth edition of the national final format used to select the Latvian entry for the Eurovision Song Contest. The competition commenced on 3 February 2024 with a semi-final and concluded with a final on 10 February 2024. The two shows in the competition took place at the LTV Studio 6 in Riga, hosted by Ketija Šēnberga and Lauris Reiniks and broadcast on LTV1 as well as online via the streaming platform REplay.lv and the official Supernova website supernova.lsm.lv. Alternative broadcasts of the final also occurred on LTV7 with a sign language translation as well as online at lsm.lv.

==== Format ====
The competition consisted of two shows: a semi-final and a final. The semi-final, held on 3 February 2024, featured fifteen competing entries from which the top ten advanced to the final. A professional jury also had the opportunity to advance a wildcard act to the final from the remaining non-qualifying entries in the semi-final, but opted against doing so. Results during both the semi-final and final shows were determined by the 50/50 combination of votes from a jury panel and a public vote, with both the jury and public vote assigning points from 1–8, 10 and 12 based on the number of competing songs in the respective show – the same system used in the final of the Eurovision Song Contest. In case of tie, the entries that received higher points from the public took precedence.

The jury voted in each show and selected entries to advance in the competition. The panel consisted of:

- Andrejs Reinis Zitmanis – musician, represented Latvia in 2023 as part of Sudden Lights
- Kārlis Kazāks – musician, program director of Latvijas Radio 5
- Krista Luīze Priedīte – content editor for LTV
- Liena Edwards – executive director of the Latvian Music Producers Association (LaIPA)
- Linda Samsonova – presenter of Latvijas Radio 5 – Pieci.lv
- Magnus Müürsepp – television producer, chief producer of the Estonian Music Awards
- Povel Olsson – Swedish producer and singer
- Ramūnas Zilnys – Lithuanian journalist, radio presenter, head of the LRT popular music department

==== Competing entries ====
On 12 September 2023, LTV opened a song submission window for artists to apply, with the deadline set for 30 November 2023. Performers were required to be Latvian nationals or permanent residents of Latvia, while songwriters and producers could be from any country. At the end of the submission period, 108 entries had been received. The participants were selected by a jury composed of representatives of the Latvian music and television industry, as well as foreign professionals (whose names were disclosed after the Eurovision Song Contest had taken place), and were announced on 9 January 2024 on the programme Rīta Panorāma, broadcast on LTV1.

Among the selected competing artists was Agnese Rakovska, who represented Latvia in 2017 as part of the group Triana Park.

Artist	Song	Songwriter(s)
Agnese Rakovska	"AI"	Agnese Rozniece; Anna Dagrita; Lauren Lucas; Matīss Repsis; Renāts Ragimhanovs
Alekss Silvers	"For the Show"	Liene Stūrmane
Avéi	"Mine"	Ieva Kudlāne; Raitis Aukšmuksts
B/H	"Amsterdam"	Jānis Līde; Kristaps Grīnbergs; Mārtiņš Balodis; Normans Bārbals
Dons	"Hollow"	Artūrs Šingirejs; Kate Northrop; Liam Geddes
Ecto	"Outsider"	Emīls Sudmalis
Edvards Strazdiņš	"Rock n' Roll Supernova"	Edvards Strazdiņš; Kerija Kalēja
Funkinbiz	"Na chystu vodu" (На чисту воду)	Kirils Ponomarenko
Jar of Kings	"Wildfire"	Artis Apinis; Artūrs Patetko; Deniss Djakons; Jānis Drēģeris; Juris Šenbergs
Katrīna Gupalo	"The Cat's Song"	Armands Varslavāns; Edgars Vilcāns; Evija Smagare; Katrīna Gupalo
Papīra Lidmašīnas	"Mindbreaker"	Juris Ludženieks; Rihards Bērziņš
Patrīcija Spale	"Heaven's Raining Down on Me"	Kate Elpo; Valters Sprūdžs
Saint Levića	"Tick Tock"	Pjotrs Strokovs; Santa Daņeļeviča
Sasha Sil	"Love Is a Language"	Liene Stūrmane
Vēstulēs	"Kur?"	Braiens Martinsons; Marta Krampe

==== Semi-final ====
The semi-final took place on 3 February 2024. 15 acts competed and the top ten entries qualified to the final based on the combination of votes from a jury panel and the Latvian public.

Semi-final – 3 February 2024
R/O	Artist	Song	Result
1	Agnese Rakovska	"AI"	Eliminated
2	Patrīcija Spale	"Heaven's Raining Down on Me"	Eliminated
3	B/H	"Amsterdam"	Eliminated
4	Alekss Silvers	"For the Show"	Advanced
5	Jar of Kings	"Wildfire"	Eliminated
6	Saint Levića	"Tick-Tock"	Advanced
7	Sasha Sil	"Love Is a Language"	Eliminated
8	Papīra Lidmašīnas	"Mind Breaker"	Advanced
9	Avéi	"Mine"	Advanced
10	Ecto	"Outsider"	Advanced
11	Dons	"Hollow"	Advanced
12	Katrīna Gupalo	"The Cat's Song"	Advanced
13	Funkinbiz	"Na chystu vodu"	Advanced
14	Vēstulēs	"Kur?"	Advanced
15	Edvards Strazdiņš	"Rock n' Roll Supernova"	Advanced

==== Final ====
The final took place on 10 February 2024 among the ten entries that advanced from the semi-final. The song with the highest number of votes based on the combination of votes from a jury panel and the Latvian public, "Hollow" by Dons, was declared the winner. In addition to the competing entries, the show featured guest performances by 2023 Estonian representative Alika and Lithuanian singer Gabrielius Vagelis.

Final – 10 February 2024
R/O	Artist	Song	Jury rank	Televote		Place
R/O	Artist	Song	Jury rank	Votes	Rank	Place
1	Vēstulēs	"Kur?"	2	31,477	2	2
2	Avéi	"Mine"	7	2,946	8	8
3	Papīra Lidmašīnas	"Mind Breaker"	10	2,018	9	10
4	Katrīna Gupalo	"The Cat's Song"	3	17,739	3	3
5	Ecto	"Outsider"	9	4,915	6	7
6	Dons	"Hollow"	1	64,845	1	1
7	Saint Levića	"Tick-Tock"	5	3,487	7	5
8	Edvards Strazdiņš	"Rock n' Roll Supernova"	8	7,830	5	6
9	Funkinbiz	"Na chystu vodu"	6	1,143	10	9
10	Alekss Silvers	"For the Show"	4	8,285	4	4

==== Ratings ====
Viewing figures by show
Show	Air date	Average viewership	Share (%)	Average rating (%)	Total viewership	Total rating (%)
Semi-final	3 February 2024	138,541	27.24%	7.9%	263,246	15.02%
Final	10 February 2024	135,165	28.22%	7.71%	288,903	16.48%

=== Promotion ===
As part of the promotion of his participation in the contest, Dons attended the PrePartyES in Madrid on 30 March 2024, the Barcelona Eurovision Party on 6 April 2024, the London Eurovision Party on 7 April 2024, the Eurovision in Concert event in Amsterdam on 13 April 2024, the Nordic Eurovision Party in Stockholm on 14 April 2024 and the Copenhagen Eurovision Party (Malmöhagen) on 4 May 2024, as well as performing at the Swedish embassy in Riga in April 2024. The singer received a budget of €5,000 from the Latvian Music Producers Association (LaIPA) for promotional activities.

== At Eurovision ==
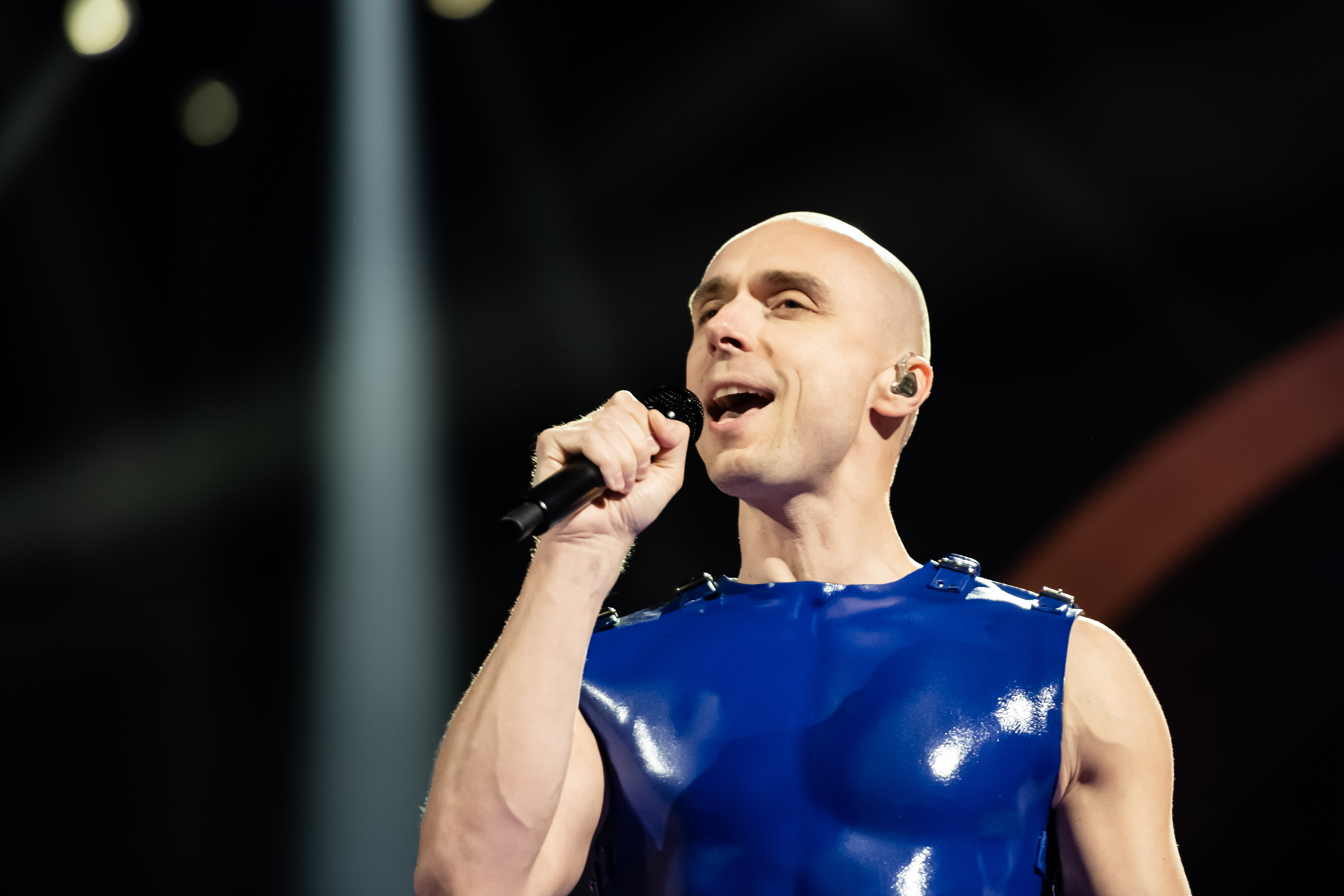
Dons during a rehearsal before the second semi-final.

The Eurovision Song Contest 2024 took place at the Malmö Arena in Malmö, Sweden, and consisted of two semi-finals held on the respective dates of 7 and 9 May and the final on 11 May 2024. All nations with the exceptions of the host country and the "Big Five" (France, Germany, Italy, Spain and the United Kingdom) were required to qualify from one of two semi-finals in order to compete in the final; the top ten countries from each semi-final progressed to the final. On 30 January 2024, an allocation draw was held to determine which of the two semi-finals, as well as which half of the show, each country would perform in; the European Broadcasting Union (EBU) split up the competing countries into different pots based on voting patterns from previous contests, with countries with favourable voting histories put into the same pot. Latvia was scheduled for the second half of the second semi-final. The shows' producers then decided the running order for the semi-finals; Latvia was set to perform in position 9.

In Latvia, all three shows of the contest were broadcast on LTV1, as well as on LTV's streaming platform REplay.lv, with commentary by Toms Grēviņš, joined by Lauris Reiniks for the final. In addition, LTV aired a number of special Eurovision-themed programmes during the contest's week.

=== Performance ===
Dons took part in technical rehearsals on 30 April and 2 May, followed by dress rehearsals on 8 and 9 May. As part of his preparation, he is followed by Spanish vocal coach Natalia Calderón. His performance of "Hollow" at the contest features a ring-shaped prop at the centre of the stage. Following his qualification for the final, Dons commented on the possibility of performing "Hollow", which is fully in English, with some Latvian language lyrics in the final. Ultimately, Dons opted to perform entirely in English for his final performance.

=== Semi-final ===
Latvia performed in position 9, following the entry from Armenia and before the entry from San Marino. At the end of the show, the country was announced as a qualifier for the final, This marked the first time since 2016 that Latvia qualified for the final. It was later revealed that Latvia placed seventh out of the sixteen participating countries in the second semi-final with 72 points.

=== Final ===
Following the semi-final, Latvia drew "producer's choice" for the final, meaning that the country will perform in the half decided by the contest's producers. Latvia performed in position 11, following the entry from Ireland and before the entry from Greece. Dons once again took part in dress rehearsals on 10 and 11 May before the final, including the jury final where the professional juries cast their final votes before the live show on 11 May. He performed a repeat of his semi-final performance during the final on 11 May. Latvia placed sixteenth in the final, scoring 64 points; 28 points from the public televoting and 36 points from the juries.

=== Voting ===
Below is a breakdown of points awarded to and by Latvia in the second semi-final and in the final. Voting during the three shows involved each country awarding sets of points from 1-8, 10 and 12: one from their professional jury and the other from televoting in the final vote, while the semi-final vote was based entirely on the vote of the public. The Latvian jury consisted of Elizabete Gaile, Kārlis Kazāks, Ance Krauze, Krista Luīze Priedīte, and Ingars Viļums. In the second semi-final, Latvia placed 7th with 72 points, receiving maximum twelve points from Estonia. This marked Latvia's first qualification to the final since 2016. In the final, Latvia placed 16th with 64 points. Over the course of the contest, Latvia awarded its 12 points to Estonia in the second semi-final, and to Switzerland (jury) and Estonia (televote) in the final.

LTV appointed Andrejs Reinis Zitmanis, who represented Latvia in the 2023 contest as member of Sudden Lights, as its spokesperson to announce the Latvian jury's votes in the final.

==== Points awarded to Latvia ====
Points awarded to Latvia (Semi-final 2)
Score	Televote
12 points	Estonia
10 points	
8 points	
7 points	Denmark; Georgia; Malta; Switzerland
6 points	Norway; Spain
5 points	Belgium; Czechia
4 points	Austria
3 points	Netherlands; San Marino (Note: San Marino uses a jury in the semi-finals.)
2 points	
1 point	

Points awarded to Latvia (Final)
Score	Televote	Jury
12 points		
10 points		
8 points		Georgia; Luxembourg
7 points		
6 points		
5 points	Ireland; Ukraine	Malta
4 points	Denmark; Lithuania; United Kingdom	Denmark; Spain
3 points	Estonia	United Kingdom
2 points	Norway	Poland
1 point	Georgia	Estonia; Netherlands

==== Points awarded by Latvia ====
Points awarded by Latvia (Semi-final 2)
Score	Televote
12 points	Estonia
10 points	Israel
8 points	Netherlands
7 points	Switzerland
6 points	Norway
5 points	Armenia
4 points	Denmark
3 points	Czechia
2 points	Austria
1 point	Belgium

Points awarded by Latvia (Final)
Score	Televote	Jury
12 points	Estonia	Switzerland
10 points	Ukraine	France
8 points	Lithuania	Ukraine
7 points	Israel	Armenia
6 points	France	Croatia
5 points	Croatia	Sweden
4 points	Switzerland	Germany
3 points	Ireland	United Kingdom
2 points	Armenia	Israel
1 point	Finland	Portugal

==== Detailed voting results ====
Each participating broadcaster assembles a five-member jury panel consisting of music industry professionals who are citizens of the country they represent. Each jury, and individual jury member, is required to meet a strict set of criteria regarding professional background, as well as diversity in gender and age. No member of a national jury was permitted to be related in any way to any of the competing acts in such a way that they cannot vote impartially and independently. The individual rankings of each jury member as well as the nation's televoting results were released shortly after the grand final.

The following members comprised the Latvian jury:

- Elizabete Gaile
- Kārlis Kazāks
- Ance Krauze
- Krista Luīze Priedīte
- Ingars Viļums

Detailed voting results from Latvia (Semi-final 2)
R/O	Country	Televote	
R/O	Country	Rank	Points
01	Malta	13	
02	Albania	15	
03	Greece	12	
04	Switzerland	4	7
05	Czechia	8	3
06	Austria	9	2
07	Denmark	7	4
08	Armenia	6	5
09	Latvia		
10	San Marino	14	
11	Georgia	11	
12	Belgium	10	1
13	Estonia	1	12
14	Israel	2	10
15	Norway	5	6
16	Netherlands	3	8

Detailed voting results from Latvia (Final)
R/O	Country	Jury							Televote	
R/O	Country	Juror A	Juror B	Juror C	Juror D	Juror E	Rank	Points	Rank	Points
01	Sweden	4	9	16	3	10	6	5	14	
02	Ukraine	5	4	2	11	1	3	8	2	10
03	Germany	7	10	5	7	11	7	4	13	
04	Luxembourg	19	18	6	24	18	16		18	
~~05~~	~~Netherlands~~ ‡ (Note: The Netherlands was disqualified prior to the final.)	~~11~~	~~6~~	~~8~~	~~19~~	~~5~~	~~8~~		N/A	
06	Israel	9	12	14	4	13	10	2	4	7
07	Lithuania	15	8	9	22	7	13		3	8
08	Spain	20	25	18	23	17	22		16	
09	Estonia	10	7	12	15	8	12		1	12
10	Ireland	14	23	10	25	25	18		8	3
11	Latvia									
12	Greece	23	19	19	18	16	20		17	
13	United Kingdom	3	14	13	9	12	9	3	20	
14	Norway	13	17	15	5	20	15		12	
15	Italy	16	11	20	12	6	14		11	
16	Serbia	25	22	24	17	24	24		23	
17	Finland	17	16	17	21	19	19		10	1
18	Portugal	12	13	7	8	9	11	1	22	
19	Armenia	6	3	3	10	4	4	7	9	2
20	Cyprus	22	21	25	20	23	25		19	
21	Switzerland	1	1	1	1	3	1	12	7	4
22	Slovenia	24	24	23	16	22	23		24	
23	Croatia	8	5	11	2	15	5	6	6	5
24	Georgia	18	15	21	13	14	17		21	
25	France	2	2	4	6	2	2	10	5	6
26	Austria	21	20	22	14	21	21		15	
