= Cyprus in the Eurovision Song Contest 2024 =

- Eurovision Song Contest 2024
- Participating broadcaster: Cyprus Broadcasting Corporation (CyBC)
- Country: Cyprus
- Selection process: Internal selection
- Announcement date: Artist: 25 September 2023; Song: 29 February 2024

Competing entry
- Song: "Liar"
- Artist: Silia Kapsis
- Songwriters: Dimitris Kontopoulos; Elke Tiel

Placement
- Semi-final result: Qualified (6th, 67 points)
- Final result: 15th, 78 points

Participation chronology

Cyprus was represented at the Eurovision Song Contest 2024 with the song "Liar", composed by Dimitris Kontopoulos, with lyrics by Elke Tiel, and performed by Silia Kapsis. The Cypriot participating broadcaster, Cyprus Broadcasting Corporation (CyBC), originally intended to select its entrant through the fifth season of the reality show Fame Story, produced in collaboration with the Greek channel Star. However, this plan was later cancelled after the Greek broadcaster ERT raised objections to the Cypriot selection process being aired in Greece by another broadcaster, and CyBC ultimately reverted to an internal selection for its entrant.

Cyprus was drawn to compete in the first semi-final of the Eurovision Song Contest which took place on 7 May 2024 and was later selected to perform in position 1. At the end of the show, "Liar" was announced among the top 10 entries of the first semi-final and hence qualified to compete in the final. It was later revealed that Cyprus placed sixth out of the fifteen participating countries in the semi-final with 67 points. In the final, Cyprus performed in position 20 and placed fifteenth out of the 25 performing countries, scoring a total of 78 points.

== Background ==
Prior to the 2024 contest, the Cyprus Broadcasting Corporation (CyBC) had participated in the Eurovision Song Contest representing Cyprus 39 times since it made its debut in the 1981 contest. Its best placing was at the 2018 contest where "Fuego" by Eleni Foureira placed second. Before that, its best result was fifth, which it achieved three times: in the 1982 competition with the song "Mono i agapi" performed by Anna Vissi, in the 1997 edition with "Mana mou" performed by Hara and Andreas Constantinou, and the 2004 contest with "Stronger Every Minute" performed by Lisa Andreas. Its least successful result was in the 1986 contest when it placed last with the song "Tora zo" by Elpida, receiving only four points in total. However, its worst finish in terms of points received was when it placed second to last in the 1999 contest with "Tha 'nai erotas" by Marlain Angelidou, receiving only two points. After returning to the contest in 2015 following their absence in 2014 due to the 2012–13 Cypriot financial crisis and the broadcaster's budget restrictions, it has qualified for the final of all the contests except in 2022, when "Ela" performed by Andromache failed to advance from the semi-finals. In 2023, "Break a Broken Heart" performed by Andrew Lambrou qualified for the final, where it placed 12th.

As part of its duties as participating broadcaster, CyBC organises the selection of its entry in the Eurovision Song Contest and broadcasts the event in the country. It had used various methods to select its entry in the past, such as internal selections and televised national finals to choose the performer, song or both to compete at Eurovision. Since 2016, the broadcaster had opted to select the entry internally without input from the public.

Originally devised plans for 2023 included the selection of the Cypriot artist through a Greek-Cypriot talent show based on the British reality television music competition All Together Now. However, the broadcaster later decided to stick to an internal selection, and deferred consideration of a national final for 2024. In May 2023, Fame Story, the Greek version of the talent show Star Academy originally aired between 2002 and 2006 on ANT1, was announced to return on CyBC in order to be used as its national final for 2024.

== Before Eurovision ==
=== National final dispute ===
CyBC initially intended to use the fifth season of the Greek talent show Fame Story to select its entry for the Eurovision Song Contest 2024. The show, filmed at the Star Channel studios in Greece, would have aired in Cyprus on CyBC. However, in late July 2023, the Greek public broadcaster Hellenic Broadcasting Corporation (ERT), the exclusive owner of the rights to Eurovision events in Greece, filed a complaint to the European Broadcasting Union (EBU), claiming that the Cypriot national final being aired in Greece through a different broadcaster would be an infringement of the contest's rules; ERT reportedly threatened to withdraw from the union if no action was taken.

In early August 2023, it was reported that the EBU had amended the contest's rules at the request of ERT, specifying that "each national selection of a representative for Eurovision should be undertaken and organised under the exclusive control of each participating broadcaster" and that "the organisation and production may not be subcontracted, except with the prior approval of the EBU". Asked to clarify its intentions for Fame Story in view of the new rules, CyBC reportedly responded that the Cypriot entrant would be internally selected in January 2024 from emerging artists in the national music industry, including Fame Story participants, and that this did not qualify the format as a national final. Instead, that same month a show would be aired from Nicosia, where the selected entrant would perform a number of songs among which the public would be called to choose. It was reported that the EBU would host a video conference on 7 August 2023 in order to reach an agreement between CyBC and ERT.

Star confirmed on 19 August that the format would not be used as part of the Cypriot national selection, contradicting earlier public announcements. Shortly after, it was announced that the show would be broadcast by Omega TV in Cyprus and not by CyBC, with the national broadcaster reverting to an internal selection.

=== Internal selection ===
CyBC internally selected Cypriot–Australian singer Silia Kapsis as the Cypriot entrant for the Eurovision Song Contest 2024. On 3 September 2023, OGAE Greece reported her name and that her selection had taken place by mid-August; the official confirmation came the following 25 September. Her entry "Liar", written by Dimitris Kontopoulos and Elke Tiel, was announced on 8 January 2024 and was released on 29 February.

=== Promotion ===
As part of the promotion of her participation in the contest, Silia Kapsis attended the Eurovision Party SKG in Thessaloniki on 29 March 2024 and the Eurovision in Concert event in Amsterdam on 13 April 2024. She additionally launched a social media challenge whereby the creator of the most liked video performance for "Liar" on TikTok between 1 and 30 April 2024 won two tickets for the Eurovision final and a meet-and-greet with her. The song was promoted by co-writer Elke Tiel on the Dutch TV show Beau, airing on RTL 4, on 2 April 2024.

=== Greek voting controversy ===
In mid-April 2024, Greek newspaper Ta Nea reported that as early as 22 February the Cypriot ambassador to Greece Stavros Avgoustidis had been informed that ERT would assign Cyprus a predetermined low score in the jury voting of the final; this was before the release of "Liar" and reportedly before the Greek jury was even established. As a response, ERT president Konstantinos Zoulas denied any involvement of the broadcaster in the jury vote, while CyBC's head of press for the contest Andreas Anastasiou addressed the matter on a TV broadcast on 15 April, denouncing that the alleged behaviour would constitute a breach of the contest's rules and announcing that the EBU had been informed of the controversy. The Greek jury eventually ranked Cyprus in second in the final, resulting in Cyprus receiving 10 points from Greece.

== At Eurovision ==
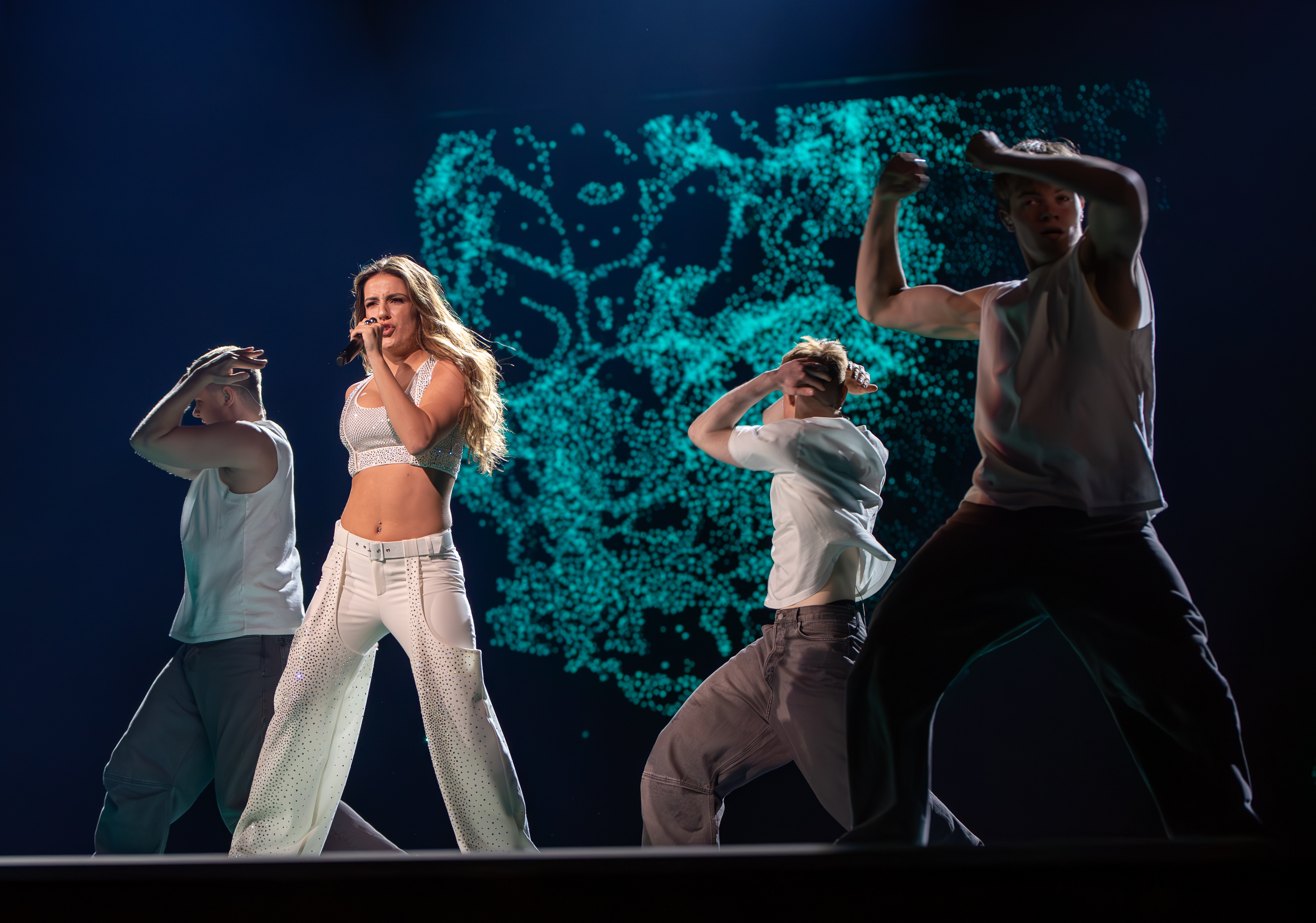
Silia Kapsis during a rehearsal before the first semi-final.

The Eurovision Song Contest 2024 took place at the Malmö Arena in Malmö, Sweden, and consisted of two semi-finals held on the respective dates of 7 and 9 May and the final on 11 May 2024. All nations with the exceptions of the host country and the "Big Five" (France, Germany, Italy, Spain and the United Kingdom) were required to qualify from one of two semi-finals in order to compete in the final; the top ten countries from each semi-final progressing to the final. On 30 January 2024, an allocation draw was held to determine which of the two semi-finals, as well as which half of the show, each country would perform in; the EBU split up the competing countries into different pots based on voting patterns from previous contests, with countries with favourable voting histories put into the same pot. Cyprus was scheduled for the first half of the first semi-final. The shows' producers then decided the running order for the semi-finals; Cyprus was set to open the show.

In Cyprus, all three shows of the contest were broadcast on RIK 1, with commentary by Melina Karageorgiou and Hovig Demirjian, as well as on radio via RIK Trito; CyBC also broadcast them internationally through RIK Sat. As part of the Eurovision programming, from 14 April 2024 until the contest week CyBC aired the Sunday broadcast United by Music on RIK 1, with Eurovision-related personalities from Cyprus (including members of the delegation, former representatives Alex Panayi and Evdokia Kadi as well as Karageorgiou and Demirjian) discussing the competing entries.

=== Performance ===
Kapsis took part in technical rehearsals on 27 April and 1 May, followed by dress rehearsals on 6 and 7 May. Her performance of "Liar" at the contest is directed by Dan Shipton and choreographed by American dancers Kelly Sweeney and Guy Groove. She was joined on stage by four Danish dancers, namely Theo B. Kofoed, Thomas Hegnet, Sebastian Laurentius Nielsen and Martin Daugaard. Her costume was designed by Stelios Koudounaris.

=== Semi-final ===
Cyprus opened the semi-final, before the entry from Serbia. At the end of the show, the country was announced as a qualifier for the final. It was later revealed that Cyprus placed sixth out of the fifteen participating countries in the first semi-final with 67 points.

=== Final ===
Following the semi-final, Cyprus was drawn to perform in the second half of the final. Cyprus performed in position 20, following the entry from Armenia and before the entry from Switzerland. Silia Kapsis once again took part in dress rehearsals on 10 and 11 May before the final, including the jury final where the professional juries cast their final votes before the live show on 11 May. She performed a repeat of her semi-final performance during the final on 11 May. Cyprus placed fifteenth in the final, scoring 78 points; 44 points from the public televoting and 34 points from the juries.

=== Voting ===
Below is a breakdown of points awarded to Cyprus in the first semi-final and in the final. Voting during the three shows involved each country awarding sets of points from 1-8, 10 and 12: one from their professional jury and the other from televoting in the final vote, while the semi-final vote was based entirely on the vote of the public. The Cypriot jury consisted of Corina Avraamidou, Panayiotis Georgiou, Aris Kyprianou, Konstantina Neofytou, and Maria Porfiriou. In the first semi-final, Cyprus placed 6th with 67 points, receiving maximum twelve points from Azerbaijan and Moldova, and marking a second consecutive qualification to the final for the country. In the final, Cyprus placed 15th with 78 points, receiving twelve points in the televote from Greece. Over the course of the contest, Cyprus awarded its 12 points to Ukraine in the first semi-final, and to Croatia (jury) and Greece (televote) in the final.

CyBC appointed Loukas Hamatsos as its spokesperson to announce the Cypriot jury's votes in the final.

==== Points awarded to Cyprus ====
Points awarded to Cyprus (Semi-final 1)
| Score | Televote |
|---|---|
| 12 points | Azerbaijan; Moldova |
| 10 points | |
| 8 points | Portugal |
| 7 points | Australia; Slovenia |
| 6 points | |
| 5 points | |
| 4 points | Croatia; Iceland; Luxembourg; Serbia |
| 3 points | |
| 2 points | Finland |
| 1 point | Ireland; Sweden; United Kingdom |

Points awarded to Cyprus (Final)
| Score | Televote | Jury |
|---|---|---|
| 12 points | Greece | |
| 10 points | | Greece |
| 8 points | | |
| 7 points | | Luxembourg |
| 6 points | Azerbaijan; Slovenia | Australia |
| 5 points | Albania; Australia | |
| 4 points | Armenia; San Marino | |
| 3 points | | San Marino |
| 2 points | | Armenia; Azerbaijan; Sweden |
| 1 point | Israel; Portugal | Croatia; United Kingdom |

==== Points awarded by Cyprus ====
Points awarded by Cyprus (Semi-final 1)
| Score | Televote |
|---|---|
| 12 points | Ukraine |
| 10 points | Lithuania |
| 8 points | Luxembourg |
| 7 points | Croatia |
| 6 points | Ireland |
| 5 points | Serbia |
| 4 points | Portugal |
| 3 points | Moldova |
| 2 points | Slovenia |
| 1 point | Iceland |

Points awarded by Cyprus (Final)
| Score | Televote | Jury |
|---|---|---|
| 12 points | Greece | Croatia |
| 10 points | Israel | France |
| 8 points | Ukraine | Israel |
| 7 points | France | Greece |
| 6 points | Switzerland | Switzerland |
| 5 points | Croatia | Serbia |
| 4 points | Armenia | Luxembourg |
| 3 points | Italy | Italy |
| 2 points | Ireland | Sweden |
| 1 point | Sweden | Ukraine |

==== Detailed voting results ====
Each participating broadcaster assembles a five-member jury panel consisting of music industry professionals who are citizens of the country they represent. Each jury, and individual jury member, is required to meet a strict set of criteria regarding professional background, as well as diversity in gender and age. No member of a national jury was permitted to be related in any way to any of the competing acts in such a way that they cannot vote impartially and independently. The individual rankings of each jury member as well as the nation's televoting results were released shortly after the grand final.

The following members comprised the Cypriot jury:

- Corina Avraamidou
- Panayiotis Georgiou
- Aris Kyprianou
- Konstantina Neofytou
- Maria Porfiriou

Detailed voting results from Cyprus (Semi-final 1)
| R/O | Country | Televote | |
| R/O | Country | Rank | Points |
|---|---|---|---|
| 01 | Cyprus | | |
| 02 | Serbia | 6 | 5 |
| 03 | Lithuania | 2 | 10 |
| 04 | Ireland | 5 | 6 |
| 05 | Ukraine | 1 | 12 |
| 06 | Poland | 13 | |
| 07 | Croatia | 4 | 7 |
| 08 | Iceland | 10 | 1 |
| 09 | Slovenia | 9 | 2 |
| 10 | Finland | 11 | |
| 11 | Moldova | 8 | 3 |
| 12 | Azerbaijan | 14 | |
| 13 | Australia | 12 | |
| 14 | Portugal | 7 | 4 |
| 15 | Luxembourg | 3 | 8 |

Detailed voting results from Cyprus (Final)
| R/O | Country | Jury | | | | | | | Televote | |
| R/O | Country | Juror A | Juror B | Juror C | Juror D | Juror E | Rank | Points | Rank | Points |
|---|---|---|---|---|---|---|---|---|---|---|
| 01 | Sweden | 18 | 6 | 12 | 4 | 16 | 9 | 2 | 10 | 1 |
| 02 | Ukraine | 10 | 7 | 8 | 17 | 10 | 10 | 1 | 3 | 8 |
| 03 | Germany | 17 | 15 | 17 | 20 | 9 | 18 | | 18 | |
| 04 | Luxembourg | 4 | 10 | 4 | 11 | 14 | 7 | 4 | 13 | |
| ~~05~~ | ~~Netherlands~~ ‡ (Note: The Netherlands was disqualified prior to the final.) | ~~21~~ | ~~16~~ | ~~10~~ | ~~16~~ | ~~11~~ | ~~14~~ | | N/A | |
| 06 | Israel | 3 | 5 | 3 | 2 | 7 | 3 | 8 | 2 | 10 |
| 07 | Lithuania | 11 | 13 | 20 | 19 | 12 | 17 | | 11 | |
| 08 | Spain | 15 | 12 | 15 | 10 | 19 | 12 | | 15 | |
| 09 | Estonia | 16 | 25 | 24 | 14 | 22 | 22 | | 21 | |
| 10 | Ireland | 25 | 21 | 21 | 18 | 25 | 25 | | 9 | 2 |
| 11 | Latvia | 13 | 20 | 14 | 24 | 24 | 20 | | 14 | |
| 12 | Greece | 7 | 1 | 5 | 5 | 3 | 4 | 7 | 1 | 12 |
| 13 | United Kingdom | 9 | 11 | 18 | 21 | 18 | 13 | | 20 | |
| 14 | Norway | 19 | 17 | 22 | 25 | 15 | 23 | | 22 | |
| 15 | Italy | 8 | 8 | 9 | 9 | 4 | 8 | 3 | 8 | 3 |
| 16 | Serbia | 5 | 14 | 6 | 8 | 6 | 6 | 5 | 17 | |
| 17 | Finland | 24 | 23 | 11 | 7 | 23 | 11 | | 19 | |
| 18 | Portugal | 12 | 18 | 25 | 23 | 17 | 21 | | 23 | |
| 19 | Armenia | 14 | 19 | 16 | 22 | 8 | 15 | | 7 | 4 |
| 20 | Cyprus | | | | | | | | | |
| 21 | Switzerland | 6 | 2 | 7 | 6 | 5 | 5 | 6 | 5 | 6 |
| 22 | Slovenia | 22 | 24 | 23 | 13 | 20 | 24 | | 24 | |
| 23 | Croatia | 1 | 3 | 1 | 1 | 2 | 1 | 12 | 6 | 5 |
| 24 | Georgia | 23 | 22 | 19 | 12 | 13 | 19 | | 12 | |
| 25 | France | 2 | 4 | 2 | 3 | 1 | 2 | 10 | 4 | 7 |
| 26 | Austria | 20 | 9 | 13 | 15 | 21 | 16 | | 16 | |
