= San Marino in the Eurovision Song Contest 2025 =

- Eurovision Song Contest 2025
- Participating broadcaster: San Marino RTV (SMRTV)
- Country: San Marino
- Selection process: San Marino Song Contest 2025
- Selection date: 8 March 2025

Competing entry
- Song: "Tutta l'Italia"
- Artist: Gabry Ponte (Note: Performance contains uncredited vocals by Andrea Bonomo and Edwyn Roberts)
- Songwriters: Andrea Bonomo; Edwyn Roberts; Gabry Ponte

Placement
- Semi-final result: Qualified (10th, 46 points)
- Final result: 26th, 27 points

Participation chronology

San Marino was represented at the Eurovision Song Contest 2025 with the song "Tutta l'Italia", written and performed by Gabry Ponte, Andrea Bonomo and Edwyn Roberts, though vocals by Bonomo and Roberts were uncredited. The Sammarinese participating broadcaster, San Marino RTV (SMRTV), organised the national final format, San Marino Song Contest, to select its entry for the contest. Over 1,200 candidate entries from 48 countries were submitted for consideration to the event, which consisted of seven semi-final rounds and a second chance round—all airing in February 2025—culminating in a final round held on 8 March 2025.

San Marino was drawn to compete in the first semi-final of the contest, which took place on 13 May 2025. Performed during the show at position 11 in the running order, "Tutta l'Italia" placed tenth with 46 points. This qualified the nation to the final held four days later, where the entry was performed 25th in the running order and placed last out of the 26 finalists.

== Background ==
Prior to the 2025 contest, San Marino RTV (SMRTV) had participated in the Eurovision Song Contest representing San Marino 14 times since its first entry in 2008. Its debut entry, "Complice" performed by Miodio, failed to qualify for the final and placed last in the first semi-final. SMRTV subsequently did not participate in both the 2009 and 2010 contests, citing financial difficulties. It returned in 2011 with "Stand By" by Italian singer Senit, which also failed to take the country to the final. From 2012 to 2014, SMRTV sent Valentina Monetta to the contest on three consecutive occasions. Monetta's first two entries failed to qualify to the final, however in 2014, she managed to bring San Marino to the final for the first time with "Maybe", which ultimately placed 24th. Following four consecutive non-qualifying years, San Marino qualified in 2019 with "Say Na Na Na" by Serhat and finished in 19th place. Senit, under her new stage name Senhit, was to return to represent the nation with "Freaky!" at the 2020 contest, however, following the contest's cancelation, SMRTV re-appointed Senhit for 2021. Her 2021 song, "Adrenalina", performed alongside American rapper Flo Rida, qualified for the final, where it placing 22nd. The Sammarinese 2022, 2023, and 2024 entries, "Stripper" by Achille Lauro, "Like an Animal" by Piqued Jacks, and "11:11" by Megara, all failed to qualify for the final.

As part of its duties as a participating broadcaster, SMRTV organises the selection of its entry in the Eurovision Song Contest and broadcasts the event in the country. Since 2022, a competition titled Una voce per San Marino ("A voice for San Marino") had been held to select the entry. In July 2024, SMRTV expressed their intent to participate in the 2025 contest and confirmed the fourth edition of Una voce per San Marino for its entry selection process.

== Before Eurovision ==
=== San Marino Song Contest 2025 ===
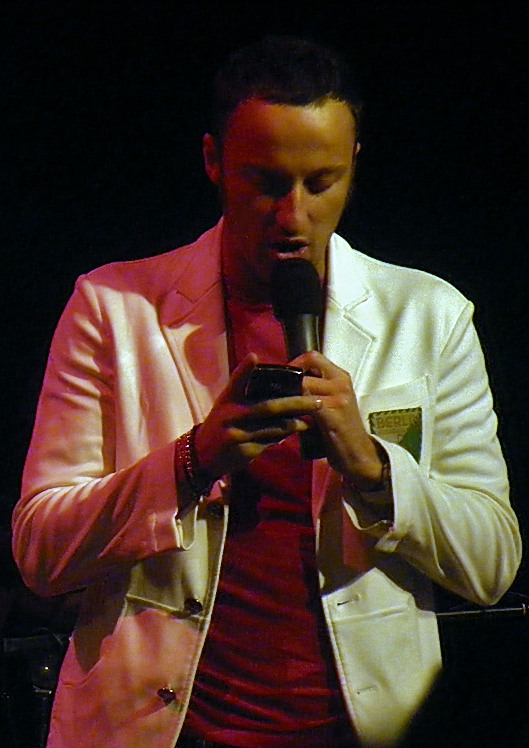
Italian DJ Francesco Facchinetti (pictured in 2009) was joined by Flora Canto to host San Marino Song Contest 2025.

In late September, SMRTV posted the rules and regulations for the fourth edition of Una voce per San Marino to select the Sammarinese entry, and set the date of the final round as 22 February 2025 at the Nuovo de Dogana. Semi-finals would be held between 17 and 21 February to select eleven finalists.

By December 2024, after a new investment plan for SMRTV was announced, the national final was rebranded as San Marino Song Contest 2025. As part of the rebrand, the selection event would receive a new logo, and an updated format and rules. Executive production was announced to be handled by Icona and Media Evolution, with Massino Bonelli as artistic director, and Cristiano D'Alisera as director.

San Marino Song Contest 2025 consisted of six semi-finals for foreign nationals—followed by a second chance round—and one semi-final reserved for Sammarinese nationals. The 20-participant final round of the event took place on 8 March 2025 and was hosted by Flora Canto and Francesco Facchinetti. Despite the official name change, the semi-finals were still broadcast under the old name Una voce per San Marino.

==== Participant selection ====
A submission window for interested artists and composers was opened in late September 2024, with a deadline of 31 December. Over 1,200 applicants from a total of 48 countries were received by the deadline, a 30% increase on submissions compared to the 2024 edition. SMRTV also confirmed that over 150 applications were received from artists in Spain, seen as an impact to both the Spanish band Megara winning the previous year's event, and the Spanish duo Nebulossa representing Spain in the 2024 Eurovision Song Contest after previously competing in the 2023 edition of Una voce per San Marino.

The selection of semi-finalists first consisted of an audition phase, with live auditions held at San Marino Outlet Experience in Falciano in six rounds: the first on 26 and 27 September 2024, the second on 17 and 18 October 2024, the third from 14 to 16 November 2024, the fourth from 12 to 14 December 2023, the fifth from 9 to 11 January 2024 and the sixth from 23 to 25 January 2024. Artists not residing in San Marino, Italy or neighbouring countries were able to attend the auditions online instead of attending in person. In addition to the regular selection process, SMRTV also launched a collaboration with Tour Music Fest, a Sammarinese music competition for emerging artists, which provided the winner of Tour Music Fest direct entry into the first semi-final of the San Marino Song Contest.

==== Semi-finals ====
The artists who progressed to the semi-finals were publicly announced by SMRTV over three days: the acts for the first and second semi-finals were revealed on 29 January 2025, followed by the artists competing in the third and fourth semi-finals on 30 January 2025, and the acts coming in the fifth and sixth semi-finals and the Sammarinese semi-final on 31 January 2025. The shows were filmed between 13 and 15 February 2025 and aired between 17 and 21 February 2025. One finalist was selected from each semi-final, and three acts from each semi-final were selected to move on to the second chance round.

Ahead of the semi-finals a total of thirteen artists subsequently withdrew their planned entries in the contest, including Serafín Zubiri who cited a scheduling conflict between his scheduled semi-final and a previously scheduled concert, and Grisana who cited a changed focus towards new music and upcoming projects. An additional ten artists were subsequently added to the line-up for the semi-finals to replace those withdrawn acts.

Key: Finalist Second chance Withdrawn/Absent

Semi-final 1 – 22 February 2025
R/O	Artist	Country	Song	Place	Result
1	Alessio's Mind	Italy	"Carpe Diem"	–	Eliminated
2	Vincenzo Bles	Italy	"Hola"	–	Eliminated
3	Vimoksha	Bosnia and Herzegovina	"Find You"	–	Eliminated
4	Atwood	Italy	"Evil"	–	Eliminated
5	Valis & Polczi	Czech Republic	"Never Alone"	–	Eliminated
6	Timo	Italy	"Suena"	–	Eliminated
7	Carson Coma	Hungary	"Daddy Said No"	3	Second chance
8	Timea	Germany	"Born to Be Free"	–	Eliminated
9	Catch the Giant!	Italy	"Eclipse"	–	Eliminated
10	The Unknown Voices	Italy	"My Name Was Hamilton"	–	Eliminated
11	Chazza	United Kingdom	"Protagonist"	–	Eliminated
12	Cecilia Herrera	Italy	"Bandida"	–	Eliminated
13	The Leaf	Italy	"I Ching"	–	Eliminated
14	Natalia	Italy	"Uomo cosmico"	–	Eliminated
15	Cristina Macchiavelli feat. Nymos	Italy	"Psiche e amore"	–	Eliminated
16	Narbera	Italy	"Credere in me"	–	Eliminated
17	Dramalove	United Kingdom	"Supernatural"	–	Eliminated
18	Max Lain	Italy	"Linee parallele"	–	Eliminated
19	Edea	United Kingdom	"L'amore non si giudica"	–	Eliminated
20	Marco Urbinati	Italy	"X Agosto"	–	Eliminated
21	Effemme	Italy	"Fuori di me"	4	Second chance
22	Lenni-Kalle Taipale & Andrea Brosio	Finland	"I'm on Fire"	–	Eliminated
23	Evdokia Moisidou	Greece	"A Dream Come True"	–	Eliminated
24	LeBlond	Spain	"Di go go"	–	Eliminated
25	Fabio Imperatrice feat. Cambra	Italy	"Serate incerte"	–	Eliminated
26	Latente	Italy	"Più grandi"	–	Eliminated
27	Galen Borson	United States	"Medicine Man"	–	Eliminated
28	King Foo	Slovenia	"The Edge of the World"	1	Finalist
29	Il Solito Dandy	Italy	"Millennial"	2	Second chance
30	Kian Butler	United Kingdom	"If You Dare"	–	Eliminated
31	Iuna	Italy	"Non mi bagno mai"	–	Eliminated
32	Justine Mayer	France	"Love Me"	–	Eliminated
33	Joanna	Italy	"I Wish to Be Me"	–	Eliminated
34	Jannike	Finland	"Goldylicious"	–	Eliminated
—	Alis Ray	Italy	—	–	Absent
—	Barak	United States	—	–	Absent

Semi-final 2 – 23 February 2025
R/O	Artist	Country	Song	Place	Result
1	Alexis Strum	United Kingdom	"If You Think I'm Too Much (You Should Go Find Less)"	–	Eliminated
2	Unico	Italy	"Scusa se ti voglio amare"	–	Eliminated
3	Davide	Italy	"Solo"	–	Eliminated
4	Tadeni	Italy	"Quicksand"	4	Second chance
5	Artemis	Greece	"Melody"	–	Eliminated
6	Sonia Nawri	Spain	"Gato negro"	–	Eliminated
7	Asia	Italy	"Magika"	–	Eliminated
8	Sofia Zaros	Ireland	"Broken Porcelain"	–	Eliminated
9	Astrid Nicole	Finland	"Dancing Without My Shadow"	3	Second chance
10	Snap-Out	Italy	"Noi diversi"	–	Eliminated
11	Beatriz Gouveia	Portugal	"The Voice"	–	Eliminated
12	Sergio Gómez	Spain	"Mejor así"	–	Eliminated
13	Blitz Union	Czech Republic	"Mr. Guilty"	–	Eliminated
14	Salva Ortega	Spain	"Solo por sus besos"	–	Eliminated
15	Claudia F	United Kingdom	"Still Here"	–	Eliminated
16	Romeo Zaharia	Romania	"Ci troveremo ancora"	–	Eliminated
17	Curli	Sweden	"Juliet"	1	Finalist
18	Phera	Italy	"Wild Woman"	–	Eliminated
19	Aniel	Poland	"777"	2	Second chance
20	Myky	Italy	"Walking on the Sea"	–	Eliminated
21	Deneb	Italy	"Sing It Louder"	–	Eliminated
22	Miguel Escobar	United States	"Polaroid"	–	Eliminated
23	Mhora	Italy	"Tornado"	–	Eliminated
24	ERISU	Italy	"The Mighty Walls of Uruk"	–	Eliminated
25	Libra	Italy	"Come ti pare"	–	Eliminated
26	Giovanni Brugnoli	Italy	"Read Me"	–	Eliminated
27	Leonor	Italy	"Fiori da ricostruire"	–	Eliminated
28	Giulia de Sisti	Italy	"Strana"	–	Eliminated
29	Léon the Singer	Germany	"When We'll Belong"	–	Eliminated
30	Giuliette Kris	Italy	"Respiro"	–	Eliminated
31	LD (Le Distanze)	Italy	"Nothing Could Be Better"	–	Eliminated
32	Ibla	Italy	"Sangue degli dei"	–	Eliminated
33	Ines	Italy	"Zero assoluto"	–	Eliminated
34	Artemiz	Spain	"Por eso brillo"	–	Eliminated
35	Jack Costanzo	Italy	"Musa"	–	Eliminated
—	Dima	Italy	—	–	Absent

Semi-final 3 – 25 February 2025
R/O	Artist	Country	Song	Place	Result
1	XSkull8	Slovenia	"Voices out of Silence"	–	Eliminated
2	Agnieszka Śpiewa	Poland	"Destiny"	–	Eliminated
3	Vicky Navarro	Spain	"Distopia"	–	Eliminated
4	Alien Cut feat. Zighi	Italy	"Vattene"	–	Eliminated
5	Ubi	Italy	"Incoerente"	–	Eliminated
6	Aria	Italy	"Life"	–	Eliminated
7	The Scurbats	Italy	"Breakdown"	–	Eliminated
8	Angy Sciacqua	Belgium	"I"	1	Finalist
9	TBO & Co.	Italy	"Musetta in sol minore"	–	Eliminated
10	Cucco	Italy	"Meraviglia (Alice)"	–	Eliminated
11	Taoma	Italy	"NPC"	4	Second chance
12	Delma & Mary Wild	Italy	"El paraiso"	–	Eliminated
13	Superguepardo	Spain	"Baila la la"	–	Eliminated
14	Eleonora Gangi	Italy	"E' un attimo morire"	–	Eliminated
15	Stavros Salabasopoulos	Greece	"Fire in My Heart"	–	Eliminated
16	Space Particles	Italy	"Resta?"	–	Eliminated
17	Federico Martello	Italy	"Voices of Freedom"	–	Eliminated
18	Sopratenore	Switzerland	"Aria e musica"	–	Eliminated
19	Francesca De Braco	Italy	"Saturday Night Show"	–	Eliminated
20	Silver feat. Skorie	Italy	"The Flow"	–	Eliminated
21	GiambattiSta	Italy	"Tutta colpa della luna"	–	Eliminated
22	Sick N’ Beautiful	Italy	"Hate Manifesto"	–	Eliminated
23	Kaotika	Italy	"Ti guardo"	–	Eliminated
24	Questo e Quello	Italy	"Bella balla"	2	Second chance
25	Magenta#9	Italy	"Vittoria"	3	Second chance
26	Polarnova	Spain	"Alpha Road"	–	Eliminated
27	Mario Nucci	Italy	"Mali di giugno"	–	Eliminated
28	Nicky Mushin Soda	Italy	"Just Your Queen"	–	Eliminated
29	Mescalina	Italy	"Eccezionale"	–	Eliminated
30	Naike	Switzerland	"Who Am I?"	–	Eliminated
31	Milad Fatouleh	Italy	"Humanity Calls"	–	Eliminated
32	Nadine Randle	Sweden	"Down"	–	Eliminated
33	Mmara	Italy	"Impazzire"	–	Eliminated
34	Mr&Mrs	Italy	"Altalena"	–	Eliminated
35	Ermal Demiri	Albania	"Moonlight"	–	Eliminated
—	Adasat	Spain	—	–	Absent
—	Carlotta	Italy	—	–	Withdrawn
—	Emheart	Italy	—	–	Withdrawn

Semi-final 4 – 26 February 2025
R/O	Artist	Country	Song	Place	Result
1	Alexander Doghmani	Germany	"Music (Is My Babe)"	–	Eliminated
2	Vee Jeck	Italy	"Ragazzo triste"	–	Eliminated
3	Aliens Agree	Belgium	"Digital Collapse"	–	Eliminated
4	Valleria	France	"A picture of myself"	–	Eliminated
5	Andrea Costa	Italy	"Una lettera spedirò"	–	Eliminated
6	Timothy Cavicchini	Italy	"May Day"	–	Eliminated
7	Andromeda	Italy	"Rumore"	–	Eliminated
8	Stefano Ganci	Panama	"Ritorna a me"	–	Eliminated
9	Sara	Italy	"Radici"	–	Eliminated
10	Romina Falconi	Italy	"Nessuno ti ama"	–	Eliminated
11	Denny Music	Italy	"Io sto bene (Tu?)"	–	Eliminated
12	Plånet	Netherlands	"San Marino"	2	Second chance
13	Eleonora Lorenzato	Italy	"Tears of the Rain"	–	Eliminated
14	Araen	Morocco	"Bleeding Out Love"	–	Eliminated
15	PierC	Italy	"Grattacieli"	–	Eliminated
16	Elisa De Panicis	Italy	"All for You"	–	Eliminated
17	Side74	Italy	"Tutto quello che mi hai dato"	–	Eliminated
18	Erika Leto	Italy	"Niente"	–	Eliminated
19	D'Amico	Italy	"Stardust"	–	Eliminated
20	Flyzir	Italy	"Mondi paralleli"	–	Eliminated
21	Mrtina	Italy	"Temporale"	–	Eliminated
22	Francesca Pichierri	Germany	"Sperarci due eroi"	–	Eliminated
23	Marti Puerto	Spain	"Fuera de ti"	–	Eliminated
24	Gianluca Amore	Italy	"Pray"	–	Eliminated
25	Rumore	Italy	"Ora no"	–	Eliminated
26	Giorgina	Italy	"Madrid-Barcellona"	–	Eliminated
27	Mansutti	Italy	"Più di così"	–	Eliminated
28	Haymara	Italy	"Tómame las manos"	1	Finalist
29	Lowbrano	Italy	"Mio padre"	4	Second chance
30	Héctor Mira	Spain	"Soy como tú"	–	Eliminated
31	Lomas	Italy	"Give Me a Reason"	–	Eliminated
32	Il Greco	Greece	"Lo specchio dell'anima"	–	Eliminated
33	Kophra	Italy	"Luci di Milano"	–	Eliminated
34	Inciso	Italy	"Rockstar"	–	Eliminated
—	Ann & Dom	United Kingdom	—	3	Withdrawn (Note: Despite placing third in semi-final 4 and qualifying for the second chance round, Ann & Dom decided to withdraw from the competition by leaving San Marino before their semi-final was due to be broadcast.)
—	Maddalena	Italy	—	–	Withdrawn
—	Magadan	Italy	—	–	Withdrawn
—	Nina Blóm	Spain	—	–	Withdrawn
—	Nexis	Australia	—	–	Withdrawn

Semi-final 5 – 26 February 2025
R/O	Artist	Country	Song	Place	Result
1	Alma	Italy	"Due fiamme"	–	Eliminated
2	Zell	Italy	"Filo di Arianna"	–	Eliminated
3	Angy – Angelica De Carolis	Italy	"Amore e veleno (Venere)"	–	Eliminated
4	The Rumpled	Italy	"You Get Me So High"	3	Second chance
5	Siriaz y Malo	Italy	"Almas en el aire"	–	Eliminated
6	Besa	Albania	"Tiki"	1	Finalist
7	Bradley Jay	United Kingdom	"Tongue-Tied"	–	Eliminated
8	Agata	Germany	"Flashback"	–	Eliminated
9	Daniela Fiorentino	Canada	"Todas somos flores"	–	Eliminated
10	Rosetta	Italy	"Tutto cambia tutto"	–	Eliminated
11	Delilah Earnshaw	Italy	"The Price"	–	Eliminated
12	Park	Italy	"Amore che sei verità"	–	Eliminated
13	Niscetas	Italy	"Unbreakable"	–	Eliminated
14	Neshe	Turkey	"Fallin'"	–	Eliminated
15	Emanuel	Italy	"Ragazzo padre (Di me stesso)"	–	Eliminated
16	Mi La Band	Italy	"Sayonara"	–	Eliminated
17	Farmacy	Hungary	"Bæd"	–	Eliminated
18	Me gustas Fer	Spain	"Corazón bellissimo"	–	Eliminated
19	Gaia Belletti	Italy	"A volte meglio io"	–	Eliminated
20	Manuè	Italy	"Fare l'amore"	–	Eliminated
21	Geisha	Italy	"Bella donna"	–	Eliminated
22	Macclesfield	Germany	"Mr. Analogue"	–	Eliminated
23	Pep Miller	Spain	"Bongo"	–	Eliminated
24	Giacomo Voli	Italy	"Ave Maria"	2	Second chance
25	Ludovica	Italy	"Maracujo"	–	Eliminated
26	Luca Grillo Live Band	Italy	"Sogno"	–	Eliminated
27	GioGala	Italy	"Dalì"	–	Eliminated
28	Lorenzo Amore	Germany	"Idee confuse"	–	Eliminated
29	Giorgia Pastori	Italy	"Mykonos"	–	Eliminated
30	Letizia Crincoli	Italy	"Running in the Circle"	–	Eliminated
31	Giuliana	Italy	"Avanti"	–	Eliminated
32	Leonardo Amor	Norway	"Calling for You"	4	Second chance
33	Ida Elena	Italy	"Children of the Stars"	–	Eliminated
34	LaRed	Italy	"Amore al veleno"	–	Eliminated
35	JB	Italy	"Come sei"	–	Eliminated
—	Elektrokarma	Italy	—	–	Withdrawn
—	Gerónimo Rauch	Argentina	—	–	Withdrawn
—	Serafín Zubiri	Spain	—	–	Withdrawn

Semi-final 6 – 27 February 2025
R/O	Artist	Country	Song	Place	Result
1	Allegra	Italy	"OMG"	–	Eliminated
2	Beatriz Villar	Spain	"Hasta perder la voz"	–	Eliminated
3	Stad	Spain	"Show Me Hate"	–	Eliminated
4	Ciro Maddaluno	Italy	"Ancora qui"	–	Eliminated
5	Sedona	Italy	"Bonsai"	–	Eliminated
6	Dana	Italy	"Cuore libero"	–	Eliminated
7	Ri-Style	Netherlands	"Always"	–	Eliminated
8	Despaux	Italy	"The Show"	4	Second chance
9	Paula Madero	Spain	"In My Dreams"	–	Eliminated
10	Energia	United Kingdom	"Sad Rags"	–	Eliminated
11	Onyra	Italy	"Out of Air"	–	Eliminated
12	Erjona Qellimi	Italy	"Mille pezzi"	–	Eliminated
13	Olya V	United States	"We Ride at Dawn"	–	Eliminated
14	Francesco Scagliarini	Italy	"Io voglio parlare d'amore"	–	Eliminated
15	Gelida	Italy	"Tevere"	–	Eliminated
16	Mynd	Italy	"Eclissi"	–	Eliminated
17	Golden Salt	Italy	"Step Down"	–	Eliminated
18	Mirjam	Estonia	"Eternity"	–	Eliminated
19	Grace George	United Kingdom	"Worship You"	2	Second chance
20	Matteo De Angelis	Italy	"Liberatemi"	–	Eliminated
21	Sola Avis	Poland	"Hope"	–	Eliminated
22	Francesca Lina	Italy	"Sempre con me"	–	Eliminated
23	Il Cremlino	Italy	"Amami"	–	Eliminated
24	Mariva	Italy	"Baba Vanga"	–	Eliminated
25	Ilenya	Italy	"Silenzi di vetro"	3	Second chance
26	Marco Di Pinto	Italy	"Out of Time"	–	Eliminated
27	Jorge Del Hierro	Spain	"No estoy pa' ti"	–	Eliminated
28	Maidomo	Germany	"Gli amori"	–	Eliminated
29	Juliusz Kamil	Poland	"Under the Blue Sky"	–	Eliminated
30	Luca Breuza	Italy	"Quello che conta"	–	Eliminated
31	Kyma	Italy	"Dracula"	–	Eliminated
32	Teslenko	Ukraine	"Storm"	1	Finalist
33	Leimannoia	Italy	"Virginia"	–	Eliminated
—	Atle Pettersen	Norway	—	–	Withdrawn
—	Grisana	Ukraine	—	–	Withdrawn
—	Matilde	Italy	—	–	Withdrawn
—	Nush Unbrushed	Finland	—	–	Withdrawn

Semi-final 7 (Sammarinese Artists) – 28 February 2025
R/O	Artist	Song	Result
1	AlleBasi	"Rotta verso il sole"	Eliminated
2	Why Xes	"Fire It Up"	Eliminated
3	Folksonic	"O visione, terra mia"	Eliminated
4	La Mafy	"Different Shape"	Eliminated
5	Kida	"Hollywood Show"	Eliminated
6	Paco	"Until the End"	Finalist
7	Kikka	"Dimmi che mi amerai"	Eliminated
8	The Reagents	"Echoes of Freedom"	Eliminated

==== Second chance ====
The second chance round was aired on 28 February 2025, with four more artists advancing to the final.

Second chance round – 28 February 2025
R/O	Artist	Country	Song	Result
1	Carson Coma	Hungary	"Daddy Said No"	Eliminated
2	Magenta#9	Italy	"Vittoria"	Eliminated
3	Plånet	Netherlands	"San Marino"	Eliminated
4	The Rumpled	Italy	"You Get Me So High"	Finalist
5	Aniel	Poland	"777"	Eliminated
6	Astrid Nicole	Finland	"Dancing Without My Shadow"	Eliminated
7	Despaux	Italy	"The Show"	Eliminated
8	Effemme	Italy	"Fuori di me"	Eliminated
9	Giacomo Voli	Italy	"Ave Maria"	Finalist
10	Grace George	United Kingdom	"Worship You"	Eliminated
11	Il Solito Dandy	Italy	"Millennial"	Eliminated
12	Ilenya	Italy	"Silenzi di vetro"	Eliminated
13	Leonardo Amor	Norway	"Calling for You"	Eliminated
14	Lowbrano	Italy	"Mio padre"	Eliminated
15	Questo e Quello	Italy	"Bella balla"	Finalist
16	Tadeni	Italy	"Quicksand"	Eliminated
17	Taoma	Italy	"NPC"	Finalist

==== Final ====
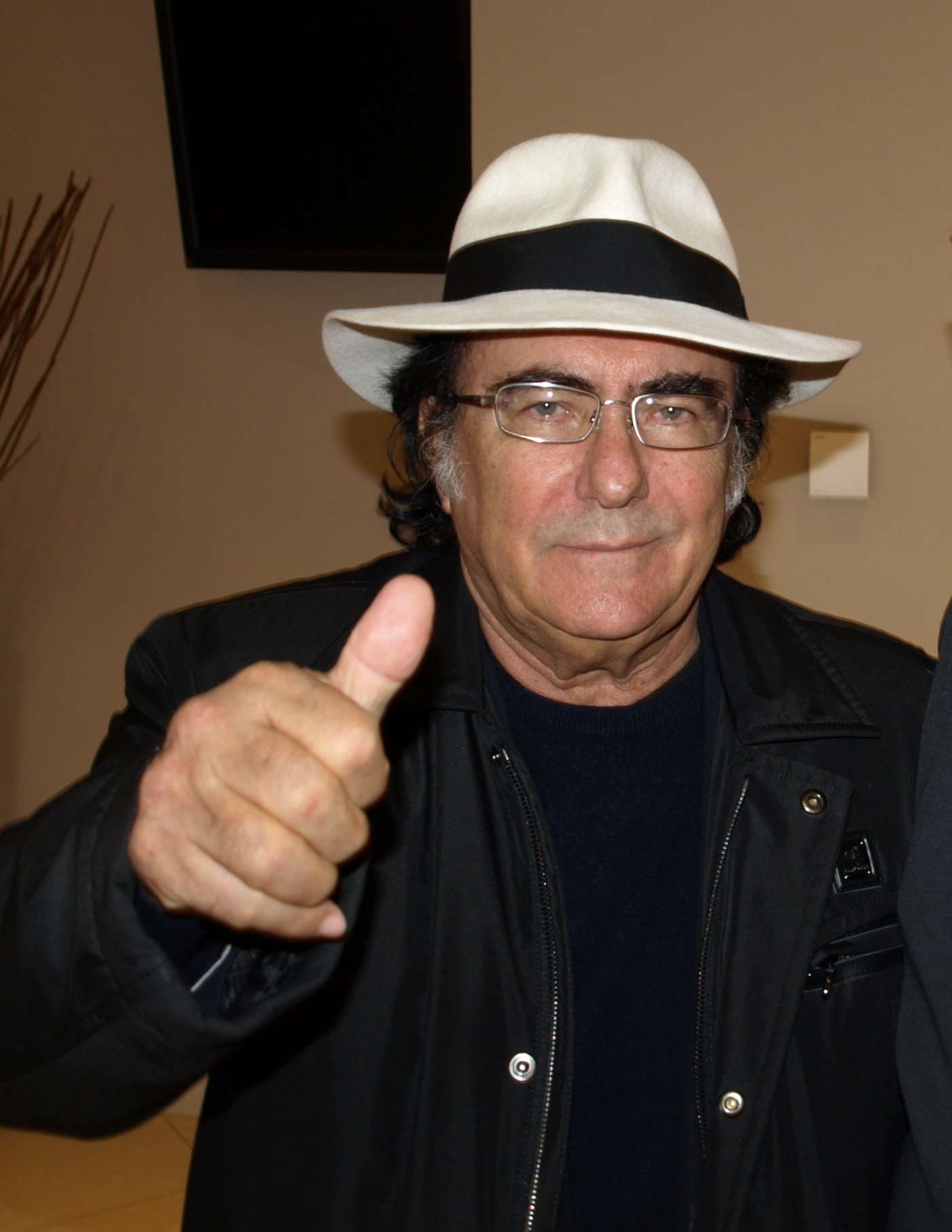
Al Bano received a Lifetime Achievement Award during the final of San Marino Song Contest 2025.

The final took place on 8 March 2025 at the Teatro Nuovo in Dogana and was hosted by Flora Canto and Francesco Facchinetti. It featured nine prequalified entries and eleven entries that qualified from the semi-finals and the second chance round. All twenty finalists were announced by SMRTV on 25 February 2025, before the semi-finals had finished airing. The event was opened by Al Bano, who served as jury president for the 2022 and 2023 editions of Una Voce per San Marino, and was also a guest in the prior year's final. He performed two songs and received a Lifetime Achievement Award from San Marino Secretary of State Federico Pedini Amati. Guest performances by non-participants included La Rappresentante di Lista, Senhit and Cristiano Malgioglio.

The winner of the final was "Tutta l'Italia", written by Andrea Bonomo, Edwyn Roberts, and Gabry Ponte, and performed by Ponte with uncredited vocals by Bonomo and Roberts. It was selected by a jury consisting of Federica Gentile (television and radio host), Ema Stokholma (television and radio host, Luca De Gennaro (DJ), Marco Andrea Ettorre (marketing manager at the Italian Society of Authors and Editors) and Roberto Sergio (SMRTV director). The jury's vote was assembled over three phases. The first took place on 4 March, before the final, and was based on "overall artistic quality" and "affinity with Eurovision"; each juror could assign a point value between 1 and 10 points to each song for each category. The second phase took place during the final, and single votes of 1 to 10 by each juror were added to the prior round's totals based on overall "quality of vocal performance", "stage presence and interpretation", "television effectiveness and charisma" and "Eurovision potential". The third phase saw the addition of a possible 10-point bonus to one entry for "overall artistic evaluation" as determined by contest Artistic Director Bonelli.

The final also saw several acts receive special awards from the jury for their participation. These included SMRTV's Ludovido Di Meo Award to Angy Sciaqua with "I", the Critics Award to Pierdavide Carone with "Mi vuoi sposare?" and the Una Voce Per San Marino Award to The Rumpled with "You Get Me So High". SMRTV considered the event successful, announcing the next day that it had over 430,000 views through formats including radio, television and on-demand, as well as over six million views on social media.

Final – 8 March 2025
R/O	Artist	Country	Song	Songwriter(s)	Place
1	The Rumpled	Italy	"You Get Me So High"	Davide Butturini; Federico Fava; Giacomo Merigo; Luca Tasin; Patrizia Vaccari; Tommaso Zamboni	2
2	Angy Sciacqua	Belgium	"I"	Angela Sciacqua; Eva Parmakova; Martin Kleveland	13
3	Haymara	Italy	"Tómame las manos"	Christian Tipaldi; Haymara Gavillucci; Simone Bacchini	13
4	Curli (Note: Credited as CRL in the final.)	Sweden	"Juliet"	Adriana Pupavac; Andreas Björkman; Boris René; David Lindgren; Gregory Curtis; Kalle Persson	7
5	Elasi	Italy	"Lorella"	Elisa Massara; Leonardo Beccafichi	4
6	Besa	Albania	"Tiki"	Flavius Filipescu; Oana Mihaela Cercel; Serban Cazan	6
7	Silvia Salemi	Italy	"Coralli"	Daniele Monellini; Enrico Palmosi; Marco Rettani; Silvia Salemi	15
8	Giacomo Voli	Italy	"Ave Maria"	Emanuela Bongiorni; Giacomo Voli; Luca Sala	8
9	Teslenko	Ukraine	"Storm"	Oleksandr Kryzhevych; Oleksandr Slinchenko; Oleksandr Teslenko	3
10	Vincenzo Capua	Italy	"Sei sempre tu"	Vincenzo Capua	17
11	Marco Carta	Italy	"Solo fantasia"	Alessandro Gemelli; Marco Rettani; Matteo Chirivì; Simone Giacomini; Tony Maiello	12
12	Bianca Atzei	Italy	"Testacoda"	Antonella Sgobio; Bianca Atzei; Diego Calvetti; Gianni Pollex; Oscar Angiuli; Roberto Guglielmi	16
13	King Foo	Slovenia	"The Edge of the World"	Rok Golob	18
14	Questo e Quello	Italy	"Bella balla"	Francesco Mannella Vardè; Lorenzo Di Blasi; Stefano D'Angelo	9
15	Pierdavide Carone	Italy	"Mi vuoi sposare?"	Pierdavide Carone	11
16	Gabry Ponte	Italy	"Tutta l'Italia"	Andrea Bonomo; Edwyn Roberts; Gabry Ponte	1
17	Luisa Corna	Italy	"Il giorno giusto"	Lorenzo Cilembrini; Luisa Corna; Riccardo Brizi	20
18	Boosta	Italy	"BTW"	Davide "Boosta" Dileo	5
19	Paco	San Marino	"Until the End"	Giovanni Ghioldi; Paco Zafferani	10
20	Taoma	Italy	"NPC"	Fabiomassimo Barelli; Tommaso Gimignani	19

=== Promotion ===
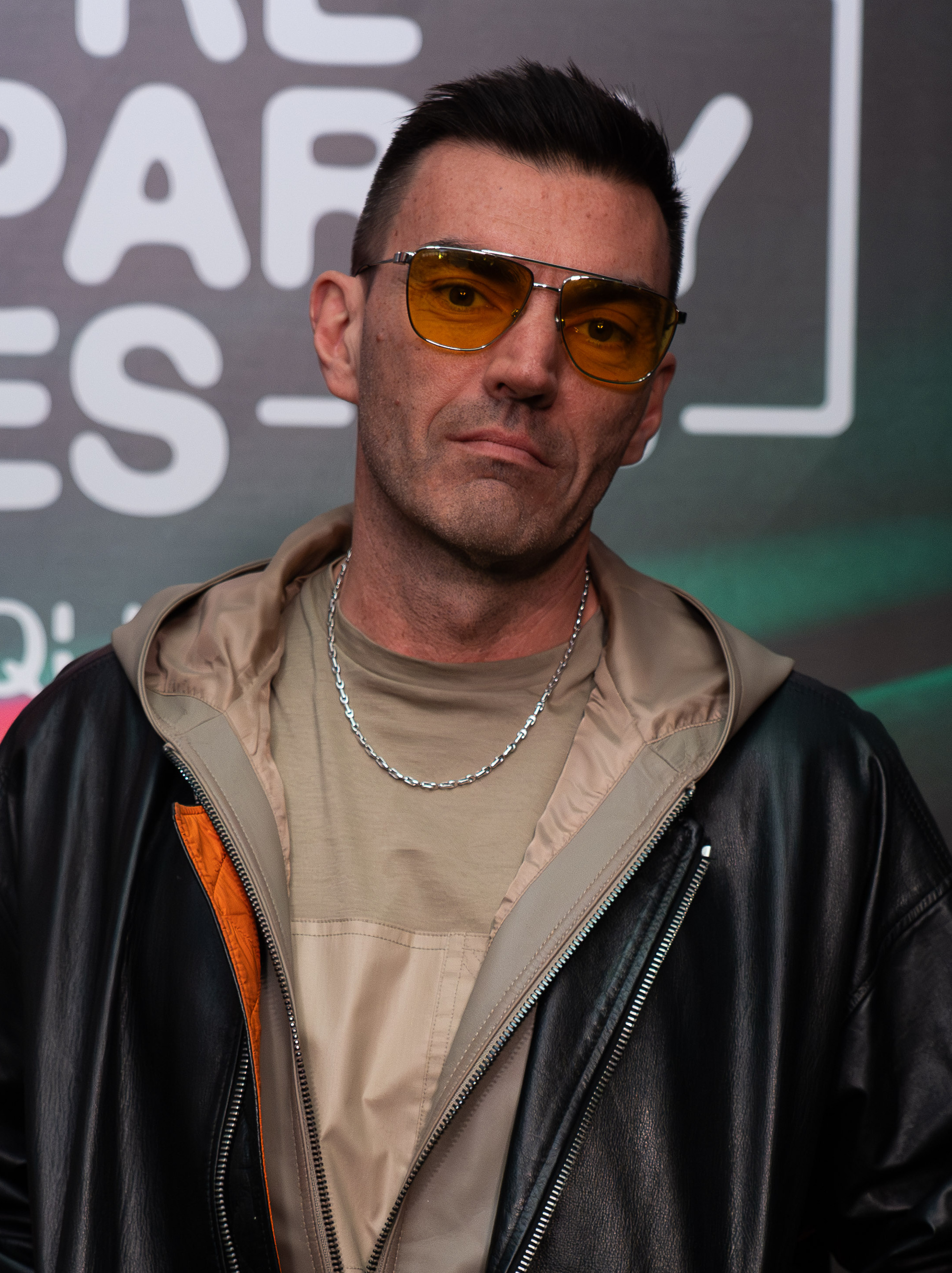
Ponte at the PrePartyES event in Madrid.

As part of the promotion of San Marino's participation in the contest, a music video of "Tutta l'Italia" was released in March 2025. Ponte then attended several publicity events including the Eurovision in Concert event in Amsterdam on 5 April 2025, the London Eurovision Party on 13 April 2025, and PrePartyES in Madrid on 19 April. Ahead of the contest, he also attended a press event where he met with Sammarinese government officials who wished him luck at the contest.

== At Eurovision ==
The Eurovision Song Contest 2025 took place at St. Jakobshalle in Basel, Switzerland, and consisted of two semi-finals held on the respective dates of 13 and 15 May, and the final on 17 May 2025. All participating countries, except the host nation and the "Big Five", consisting of France, Germany, Italy, Spain, and the United Kingdom, were required to qualify from one of two semi-finals to compete for the final; the top 10 countries from their respective semi-finals progressed to the final. On 28 January 2025, an allocation draw was held to determine which of the two semi-finals, as well as which half of the show, each country would perform in; the EBU split up the competing countries into different pots based on historic voting patterns, attempting to split up nations that historically voted for each other. San Marino was scheduled for the second half of the first semi-final. The shows' producers then decided the running order for the semi-finals; San Marino was set to perform in position 11 of 15.

In San Marino, all the shows of the contest were broadcast on San Marino RTV, as well as on the broadcaster's streaming platform RTV Play, with commentary by Anna Gaspari and Gigi Restivo.

=== Performances ===
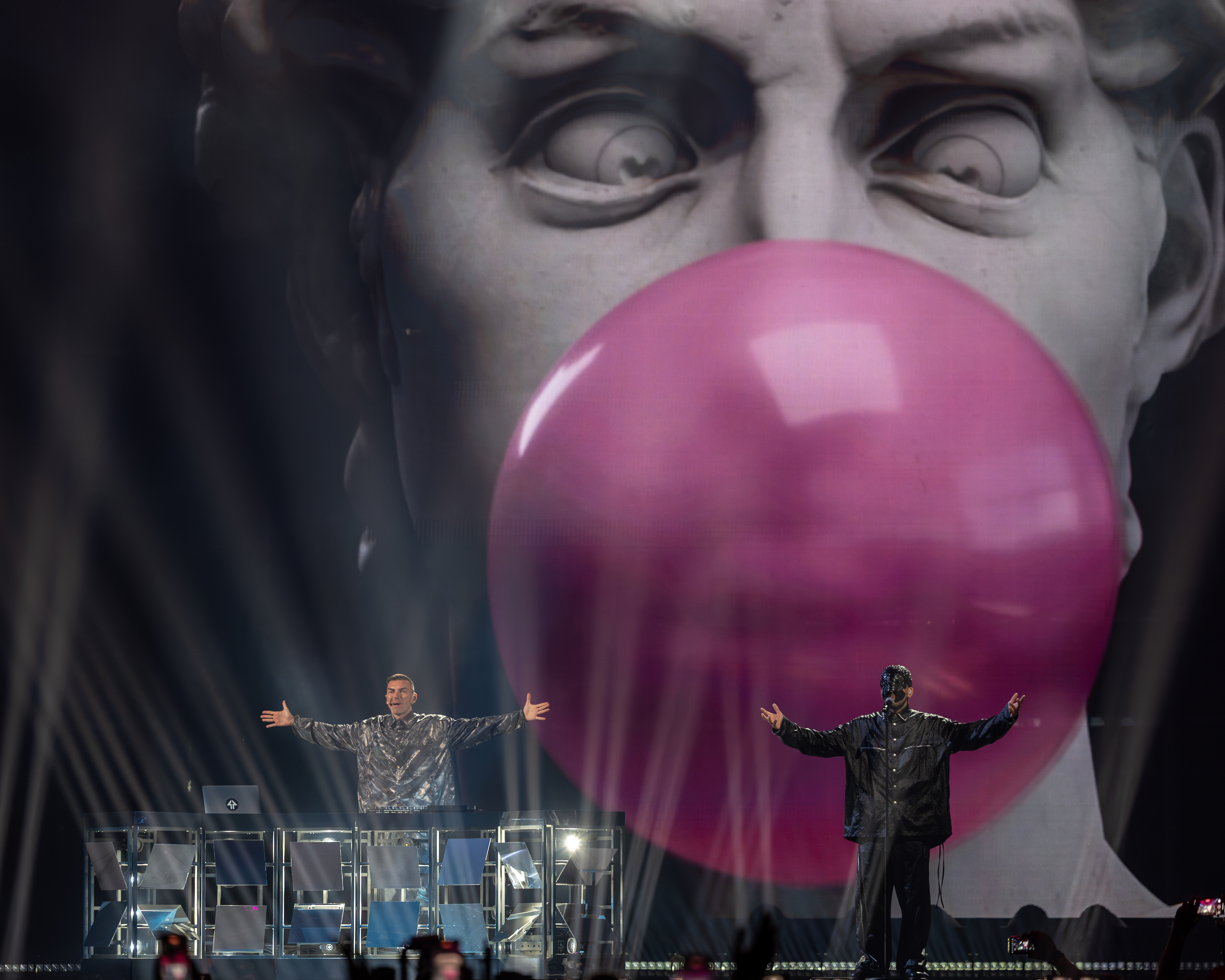
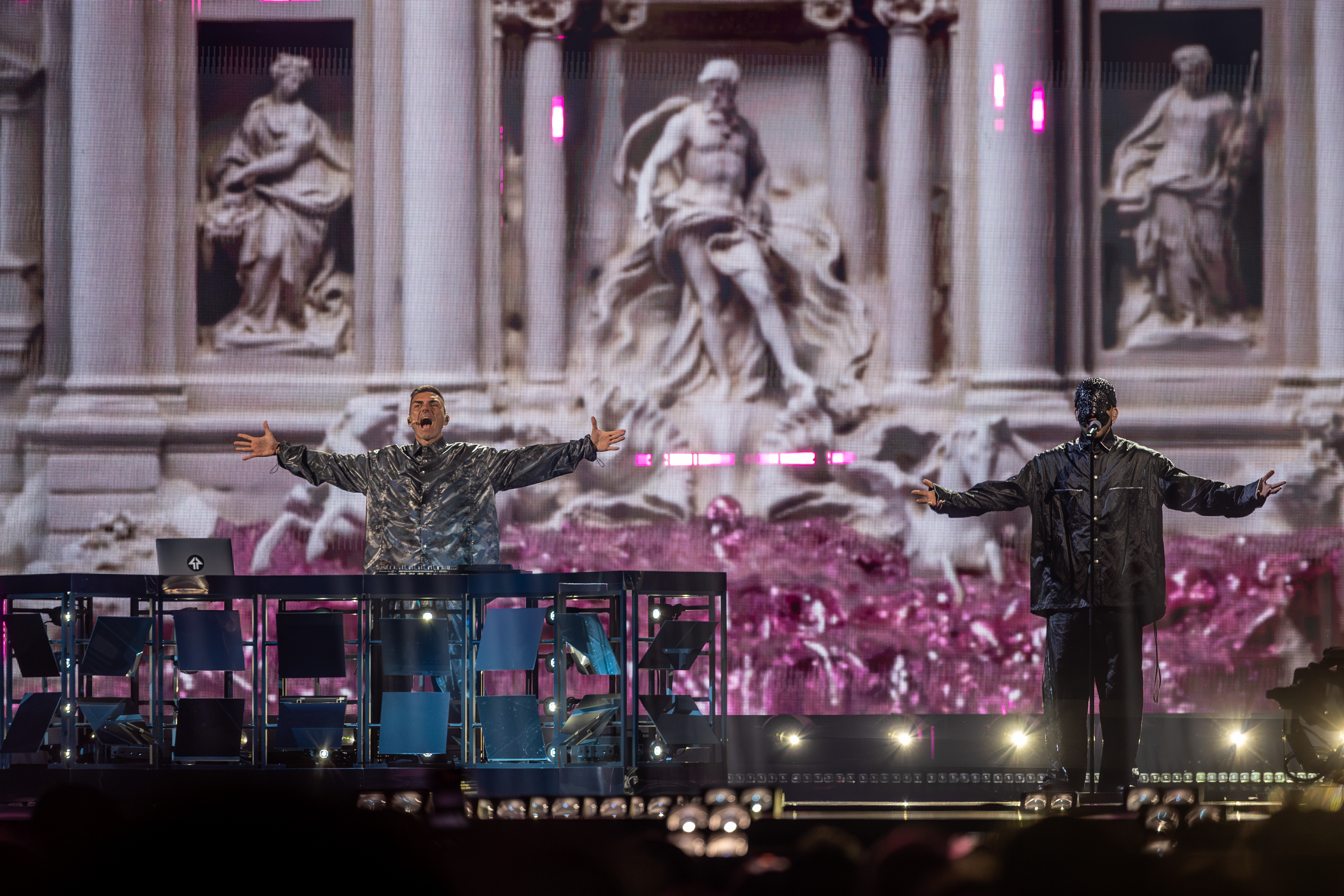
Ponte and a masked vocalist on stage at the Eurovision Song Contest 2025.

Ponte took part in technical rehearsals on 6 and 8 May, followed by dress rehearsals on 12 and 13 May. The performance of "Tutta l'Italia" at the contest was altered from its San Marino Song Contest staging, with the six-person maximum quantity of performers on stage being cited by Ponte as the impetus. The many dancers that had surrounded Ponte were replaced by two masked vocalists, and the backdrop consisted of Italian monuments and landmarks on screen. Occasionally they'd turn pink and Michaelangelo's David was shown animated and chewing gum.

San Marino performed in the first semi-final in position 11, following the entry from Azerbaijan and before the entry from Albania. At the end of the semi-final, it was announced that the nation qualified for the final; it was later revealed that the act received 46 points. In the final, held four days later, Ponte performed second to last in the running order, after France and before Albania. The entry received 27 points, placing last of the 26 finalists.

=== Voting ===
Voting during the three shows involved each country awarding sets of points from 1–8, 10 and 12: one from their professional jury and the other from televoting in the final vote, while the semi-final vote was based entirely on the vote of the public. As San Marino shares its telephone system with Italy, the country's jury votes were used during the semi-final, while at the final an aggregate televote created using the televotes of neighbouring countries was used. The Sammarinese jury consisted of Alessandro Riccardi, Fabrizio Raggi, Piermatteo Carattoni, Olivia Marani, Sofia Toccaceli. These members were music industry professionals who are Sammarinese citizens, and each jury and individual jury member were required to meet a set of EBU criteria regarding professional background and diversity in gender and age. Additionally, no member of the national jury was permitted to be related in any way to any of the competing acts in such a way that they could not vote impartially and independently.

In the first semi-final, San Marino placed 10th and qualified for the final. It received 46 points in total, which included a top 12 points from the Italian televote. In the final, the nation placed last of the 26 entries with 27 points, which again included a top 12 points from the Italian jury. Over the course of the contest, the nation awarded its top 12 points to Belgium in the first semi-final and to Italy (jury) and Greece (aggregate televote) in the final. Senhit served as the Sammarinese spokesperson, announcing the votes awarded by the Sammarinese jury during the final.

==== Points awarded to San Marino ====
Points awarded to San Marino (Semi-final 1)
Points	Televote
12 points	Italy
10 points	
8 points	
7 points	
6 points	
5 points	Azerbaijan; Switzerland
4 points	Albania; Estonia
3 points	Iceland; Sweden
2 points	Croatia; Cyprus; Norway
1 point	Belgium; Poland; Portugal; Spain

Points awarded to San Marino (Final)
Score	Televote	Jury
12 points	Italy	
10 points		
8 points		
7 points		
6 points		Italy
5 points		
4 points		
3 points	Albania; Malta	
2 points		Albania
1 point		Cyprus

==== Points awarded by San Marino ====
Points awarded by San Marino (Semi-final 1)
Points	Jury
12 points	Belgium
10 points	Estonia
8 points	Slovenia
7 points	Azerbaijan
6 points	Ukraine
5 points	Cyprus
4 points	Portugal
3 points	Netherlands
2 points	Croatia
1 point	Albania

Points awarded by San Marino (Final)
Points	Aggregated televote	Jury
12 points	Greece	Italy
10 points	Israel	Switzerland
8 points	Albania	Latvia
7 points	Estonia	Estonia
6 points	Poland	Portugal
5 points	Austria	France
4 points	Ukraine	Ukraine
3 points	Italy	Lithuania
2 points	Netherlands	United Kingdom
1 point	Sweden	Malta

==== Detailed voting results ====
The members of the Sammarinese jury were:

- Alessandro Riccardi
- Fabrizio Raggi
- Piermatteo Carattoni
- Olivia Marani
- Sofia Toccaceli

Detailed voting results from San Marino (Semi-final 1)
R/O	Country	Jury	
R/O	Country	Rank	Points
01	Iceland	11	
02	Poland	14	
03	Slovenia	3	8
04	Estonia	2	10
05	Ukraine	5	6
06	Sweden	13	
07	Portugal	7	4
08	Norway	12	
09	Belgium	1	12
10	Azerbaijan	4	7
11	San Marino		
12	Albania	10	1
13	Netherlands	8	3
14	Croatia	9	2
15	Cyprus	6	5

Detailed voting by San Marino
R/O	Country	Jury							Aggregated televote	
R/O	Country	Juror A	Juror B	Juror C	Juror D	Juror E	Rank	Points	Rank	Points
01	Norway	23	14	17	18	18	22		11	
02	Luxembourg	24	9	20	24	21	20		23	
03	Estonia	6	6	4	9	9	4	7	4	7
04	Israel	25	23	9	25	15	19		2	10
05	Lithuania	11	3	8	12	13	8	3	14	
06	Spain	15	20	15	19	11	17		15	
07	Ukraine	9	22	3	5	17	7	4	7	4
08	United Kingdom	10	5	13	14	5	9	2	22	
09	Austria	14	12	7	15	4	13		6	5
10	Iceland	22	8	24	17	22	16		19	
11	Latvia	13	2	14	6	3	3	8	17	
12	Netherlands	18	17	11	16	19	18		9	2
13	Finland	19	24	23	13	24	23		12	
14	Italy	1	1	1	1	1	1	12	8	3
15	Poland	21	21	22	21	23	25		5	6
16	Germany	12	13	10	4	8	11		16	
17	Greece	7	15	5	22	7	12		1	12
18	Armenia	20	11	19	23	20	21		18	
19	Switzerland	2	7	2	2	2	2	10	20	
20	Malta	5	16	25	7	6	10	1	21	
21	Portugal	4	10	12	3	16	5	6	25	
22	Denmark	16	25	16	8	14	15		24	
23	Sweden	17	18	18	20	25	24		10	1
24	France	3	19	6	10	10	6	5	13	
25	San Marino									
26	Albania	8	4	21	11	12	14		3	8
