= Flora Canto =

Italian comedian and television presenter (born 1983)

- Born: 12 February 1983 (age 43); Rome, Italy
- Occupations: Actress; comedian; television presenter
- Years active: 2005–present
- Spouse: Enrico Brignano (m. 2022)
- Children: 2

Flora Canto (born 12 February 1983) is an Italian comedian, actress and television presenter. Born in Rome, she first came to public attention as a contestant on the dating show Uomini e donne before pursuing a career in television and acting.

Canto has appeared in television programmes including comedy shows Made in Sud and Colorado, and the game show Tale e quale show. From 2020 to 2022, she hosted Un'ora sola vi vorrei on Rai 2 alongside Enrico Brignano. She participated in the fifth season of Amazon Prime Video comedy show LOL - Chi ride è fuori in 2025.

In July 2022, she married Brignano in Ladispoli, near Rome. They have two children.

== Filmography ==
Film
Year	Title	Role	Notes
2013	L'ultimo weekend	Simona	Television film
2016	La coppia dei campioni	Angela Ricci	
2019	Di tutti i colori	Anna	
2020	Cambio tutto!	Vanessa	

Television
Year	Title	Role	Notes
2009	Don Matteo	Rosella Farneti	Episode "Corsa contro il tempo" (season 7)
2016	Il sistema	Secretary	Recurring role

== Television ==
- Fast and Furious (La7, 2009)
- Telethon (Rai 1, 2010, 2017) – co-host
- Oscar dei Porti (Rai 1, 2010)
- Made in Sud (Rai 2, 2013-2015)
- Comedy Central Tour (Comedy Central, 2015)
- Partita del cuore (Rai 1, 2016) – co-host
- Supercinema (Canale 5, 2016-2017)
- La partita mundial (Italia 1, 2018)
- Ricette all'italiana (Rete 4, 2018)
- Colorado (Italia 1, 2019)
- Tale e quale show (Rai 1, 2019) – contestant
- Ogni mattina (TV8, 2020)
- Un'ora sola vi vorrei (Rai 2, 2020-2022) – co-host
- Fatto da mamma (Rai 2, 2021)
- Fatto da mamma e da papà (Rai 2, 2022-2023)
- I migliori anni (Rai 1, 2023)
- I fatti vostri (Rai 2, 2023-2024)
- Zecchino d'Oro (Rai 1, 2023) – judge
- Gli occhi del musicista (Rai 2, 2023-2025)
- San Marino Song Contest (SMRTV, 2025)
- LOL - Chi ride è fuori (Prime Video, 2025) – contestant
