= San Marino in the Eurovision Song Contest 2024 =

- Eurovision Song Contest 2024
- Participating broadcaster: San Marino RTV (SMRTV)
- Country: San Marino
- Selection process: Una voce per San Marino 2024
- Selection date: 24 February 2024

Competing entry
- Song: "11:11"
- Artist: Megara
- Songwriters: Isra Dante Ramos Solomando; Roberto la Lueta Ruiz; Sara Jiménez Moral

Placement
- Semi-final result: Failed to qualify (14th)

Participation chronology

San Marino was represented at the Eurovision Song Contest 2024 with the song "11:11", performed by the Spanish band Megara. The song was written by Isra Dante Ramos Solomando, Roberto la Lueta Ruiz, and Sara Jiménez Moral. The nation's participating broadcaster, San Marino RTV (SMRTV), organised the national final format Una voce per San Marino in collaboration with Media Evolution S.r.l. to select its entry. Over 700 candidate entries from 31 countries were submitted for consideration to the event, which consisted of five semi-final rounds, a second chance round and a final round, all airing in February 2024.

Promotion of the entry consisted of a tour of a selection of nations participating in the contest, including Denmark, England, Spain, Sweden and the Netherlands. San Marino was drawn to compete in the second semi-final of the contest, which took place on 9 May 2024. Performing during the show at position 10 in the running order, "11:11" did not qualify to compete in the final. It placed 14th out of the 16 participating countries in its semi-final and received 16 points total.

== Background ==
Prior to the 2024 contest, San Marino RTV (SMRTV) had participated in the Eurovision Song Contest representing San Marino 13 times since its first entry in 2008. Its debut entry in the 2008 contest, "Complice" performed by Miodio, failed to qualify for the final and placed last in the first semi-final. SMRTV subsequently did not participate in both the 2009 and 2010 contests, citing financial difficulties. It returned in 2011 with "Stand By" by Italian singer Senit, which also failed to take the country to the final. From 2012 to 2014, SMRTV sent Valentina Monetta to the contest on three consecutive occasions. Monetta's first two entries failed to qualify to the final, however in 2014, she managed to bring San Marino to the final for the first time with "Maybe", which eventually placed 24th.

Following four consecutive non-qualifying years, San Marino qualified for the final for the second time at the Eurovision Song Contest 2019, where "Say Na Na Na" by Serhat –representing San Marino for a second time– finished in 19th place. For the 2020 contest, "Freaky!" by Senhit was to represent the nation, though following the contest cancellation as a result of the COVID-19 pandemic, SMRTV re-selected Senhit for 2021. Her 2021 song, "Adrenalina", performed alongside American rapper Flo Rida, qualified for the final, eventually placing 22nd. The Sammarinese 2022 and 2023 entries, "Stripper" by Achille Lauro and "Like an Animal" by Piqued Jacks, both failed to qualify for the final. Since the 2022 contest, SMRTV has used the televised national final-style event Una voce per San Marino to select its entry, and in August 2023 it confirmed that the selection event would continue to be used for the 2024 contest.

== Before Eurovision ==
=== Una voce per San Marino ===
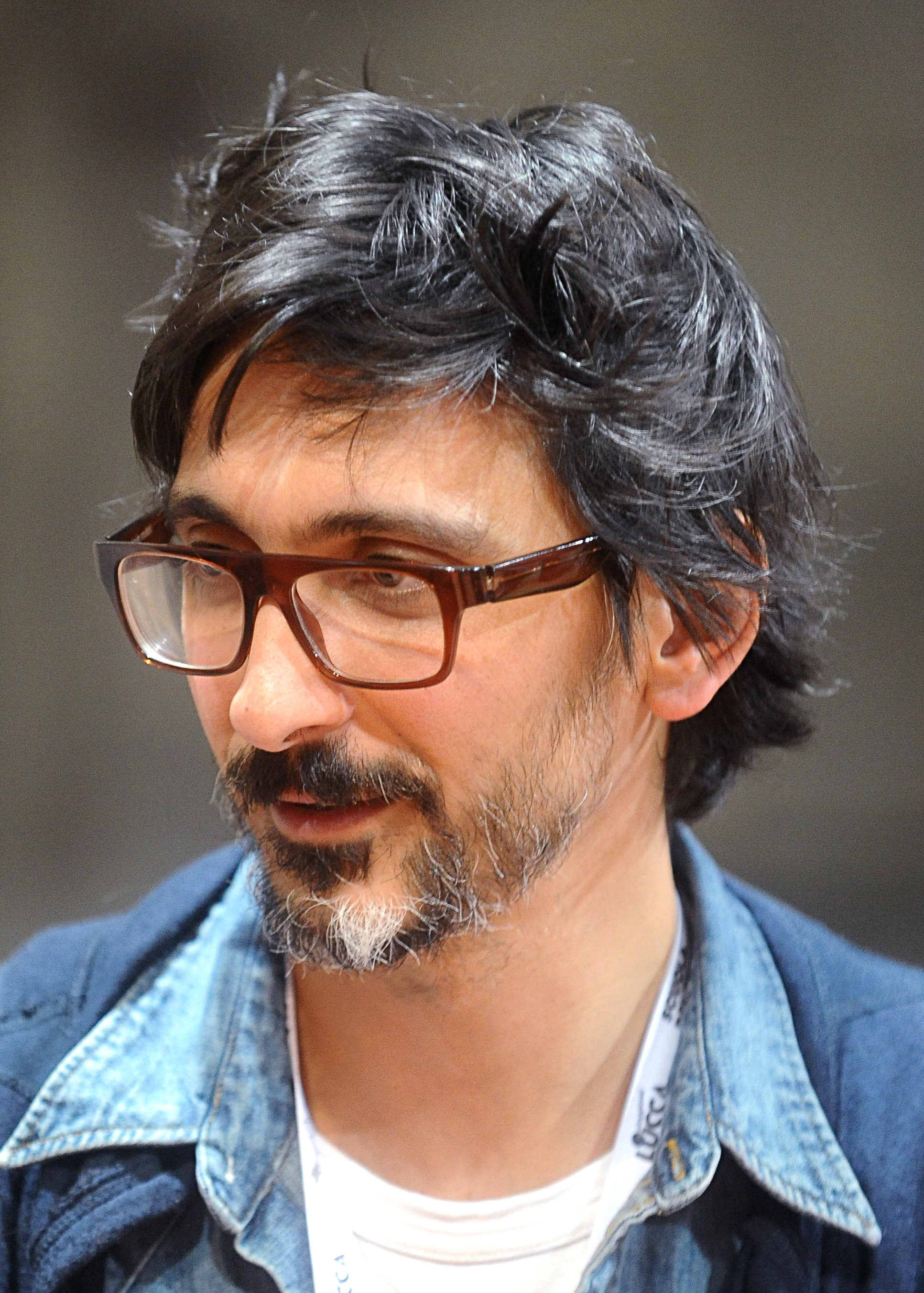
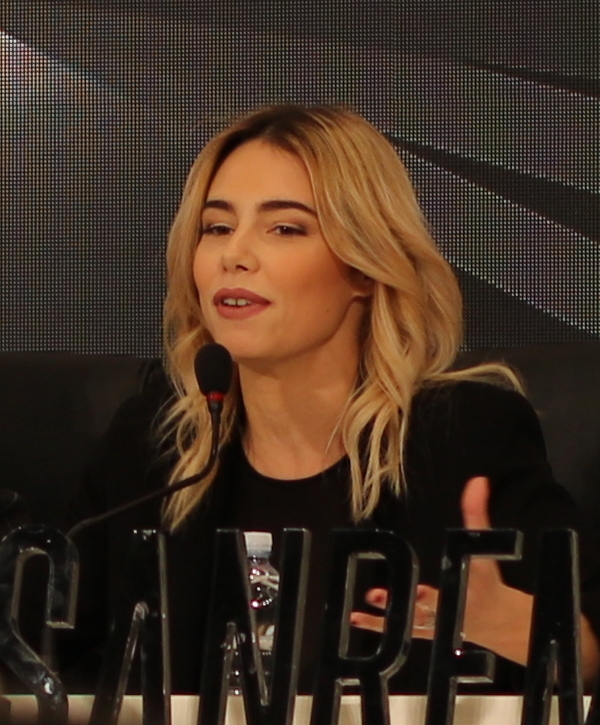
The final round of Una voce per San Marino 2024 was hosted by Fabrizio Biggio and Melissa Greta Marchetto.

Una voce per San Marino 2024 was the third edition of the national selection format developed by SMRTV and Media Evolution S.r.l. to determine the Sammarinese entry to the Eurovision Song Contest. It consisted of four semi-finals for foreign nationals – followed by a second chance round – and one semi-final reserved for Sammarinese nationals. All rounds took place at the Sala Polivalente Little Tony in Serravalle on 15 and 16 February 2024, and were hosted by Ilenia De Sena and Camilla Spinelli. They were then aired daily between 19 and 23 February, culminating with the final at the Teatro Nuovo in Dogana on 24 February 2024, hosted by Fabrizio Biggio and Melissa Greta Marchetto, which saw eight established artists and eight newcomers (one being from San Marino) compete. A jury vote determined the qualifiers from the semi-finals and the winner of the final. Outside San Marino, the final was broadcast on GlitterBeam Radio in the United Kingdom.

==== Participant selection ====
The selection of semi-finalists first consisted of an audition phase for emerging artists between 10 November 2023 and 23 January 2024, where 129 entries qualified for the semi-finals; applications were open between 10 October 2023 and 14 January 2024, by which date over 700 submissions had been received from at least 31 countries. There were no restrictions on the nationality of the performer or the language of the song. Established artists were instead directly invited to the final by Media Evolution S.r.l. Live auditions took place at San Marino Outlet Experience in four rounds: the first from 10 to 12 November 2023, the second from 1 to 3 December 2023, the third from 12 to 14 January 2024 and the fourth from 18 to 20 January 2024; an additional online round was held on 22 and 23 January 2024. A professional jury then selected the semi-finalists, and it was composed of music producers Domenico "Mimmo" Paganelli, Domenico "Mimmo" Gallotti and Nabuk. In addition to the regular selection process, SMRTV also launched a collaboration with London-based music tech startup Casperaki, named The San Marino Sessions, to determine an additional finalist. Starting on 19 November 2023 and until the final of 24 February 2024, SMRTV aired a 15-minute daily broadcast presenting the participating artists, hosted by rapper Irol.

==== Semi-finals ====
On 30 January 2024, SMRTV announced the names of the 129 acts that had been selected to progress to the semi-final stage, most being from Italy, as well as the semi-final they would take part in. The shows were filmed on 15 and 16 February 2024 and aired between 19 and 23 February 2024. One finalist was selected from each semi-final, and four acts from each semi-final were selected to move on to the second chance round.

Key: Finalist Second chance Absent

Semi-final 1 – 19 February 2024
R/O	Artist	Song	Result
1	Alabaster	"Antartide"	Eliminated
2	Aleph	"Amami"	Eliminated
3	Alessandro Bruni	"Un secondo eterno"	Eliminated
4	Alis Ray	"Flow of Love"	Eliminated
5	Allegra	"Re Mida"	Eliminated
6	Amanda	"Dejavu"	Eliminated
7	Cabiria	"Fable"	Eliminated
8	Dafne	"Dentro la mia testa"	Eliminated
9	Daudia	"With You"	Finalist
10	Ela	"Parthenope"	Eliminated
11	Elena	"Macchina in corsa"	Eliminated
12	Frammenti	"Weekend"	Eliminated
13	Giada Fazi	"Us"	Eliminated
14	Héctor Mira	"Siente"	Eliminated
15	Ilenia Suffredini	"Adrenalina"	Eliminated
16	Isoladellerose	"Se andrò all'inferno tu verrai con me"	Eliminated
17	Isotta	"Coming Out"	Eliminated
18	Itama	"Chorizo"	Second chance
19	Julia	"Viola sotto zero"	Eliminated
20	Kija	"Disco Love"	Eliminated
21	Loco BoomBox	"En forma"	Eliminated
22	Lord Spark	"Close to You"	Eliminated
23	Mace	"Vivimi"	Second chance
24	Masala and Foresta	"Paranoia"	Second chance
25	Miki Spire	"Fulmine"	Eliminated
26	RanMa	"Window"	Eliminated
27	Sciaco	"KO"	Eliminated
28	Simon Evans	"Anywhere to Go"	Second chance
29	Tommaso Sangiorgi	"Il canto delle paure"	Eliminated
30	Venn Smyth	"Jumper"	Eliminated
31	Zaira	"Sacchetto di plastica"	Eliminated

Semi-final 2 – 20 February 2024
R/O	Artist	Song	Result
1	AaLE	"All Black"	Eliminated
2	Alessio De Cicco	"Fragile"	Eliminated
3	Alessio's Mind	"We're Burning"	Eliminated
4	Anthony	"State of Mind (S.O.M)"	Eliminated
5	Babols	"Balla balla"	Eliminated
6	Basti	"Rhythm in the Rain"	Second chance
7	Booom!	"Dance like This"	Finalist
8	Camellini	"Patchwork"	Second chance
9	Dan e i suoi Fratelli	"Il Mottarello"	Eliminated
10	Deschema	"Demoni"	Eliminated
11	Dia	"The Greatest Love"	Eliminated
12	Edoardo Brogi	"Magari subito"	Second chance
13	Falling Giant	"Show of the False"	Eliminated
14	Feel	"How Could I Know"	Eliminated
15	Francesco Balasso	"Eiffel"	Eliminated
16	Guglielmo	"Sesso e lacrime"	Eliminated
17	Haru	"Kalimba"	Eliminated
18	Jucaso	"Hey Ciao!"	Eliminated
19	La Bebae	"Scanner"	Eliminated
20	Lanona	"Se questa notte"	Eliminated
21	Lasties	"Romantic Killer"	Eliminated
22	Manuel Meroni	"Il respiro delle rondini"	Eliminated
23	Megara	"11:11"	Second chance
24	Nemo	"Chimera"	Eliminated
25	Senzavolto	"Ancora è notte"	Eliminated
26	Sika & Lurose	"Veneno"	Eliminated
27	Sofia Villa	"Just a Page"	Eliminated
28	Tomash	"Not Alone"	Eliminated
29	Valerio Sgargi	"Polvere"	Eliminated
30	Will on Earth	"Deep Inside the Heart of Men"	Eliminated
—N/a	~~Acousticouple~~	—	Absent

Semi-final 3 – 21 February 2024
R/O	Artist	Song	Result
1	Xada	"Shell"	Eliminated
2	Alessandro and Guya Canino	"Liberi tutti quanti"	Eliminated
3	Alunno	"Inevitabile"	Eliminated
4	Atwood	"Can't Stop Me"	Eliminated
5	Camilla Rinaldi	"Rara"	Eliminated
6	Camilla Ruffini	"Mi dicono"	Eliminated
7	Cinzia Paoletti	"Tallone d'Achille"	Second chance
8	Corde Libere	"Deserti in viaggio"	Second chance
9	Cristiano Cosa	"Crescere"	Eliminated
10	Daiana Lou	"Trauma"	Eliminated
11	Eki & Katy	"Oro e diamante"	Eliminated
12	Elina	"Ti amo"	Eliminated
13	Emil Lindholm	"Try My Luck"	Eliminated
14	Fijord	"Giulia"	Eliminated
15	Ilyth	"Love"	Eliminated
16	Karma	"Meglio di no"	Eliminated
17	Lorenzo Postiglione	"Pochi eroi"	Eliminated
18	Malvax	"La Spezia"	Eliminated
19	Mark	"Return"	Eliminated
20	Mate	"Big Mama"	Finalist
21	Mhora	"Le labbra in fumo"	Eliminated
22	Michela Baselice	"Abbassa la cresta"	Eliminated
23	Noor	"Canzone tragicomica"	Eliminated
24	Operapop	"Like Angels"	Eliminated
25	Ros-Aria	"Blu notte"	Eliminated
26	The Atlantis	"Heart of the Abyss"	Eliminated
27	The Miss	"L'enfer"	Eliminated
28	This Is Elle	"Gold"	Second chance
29	XGiove	"Nostalgia"	Second chance
—N/a	~~Daniel Marin~~	—	Absent

Semi-final 4 – 22 February 2024
R/O	Artist	Song	Result
1	Auroro Borealo and Martelli	"Giù dal pero"	Eliminated
2	Bluesy	"Dune"	Eliminated
3	Brenda Novella	"Where I Belong"	Eliminated
4	Cainero	"Buio"	Eliminated
5	Casino Moon	"La chiave"	Eliminated
6	Dəva	"One Love"	Second chance
7	Dez	"Freedom"	Finalist
8	Diego Federico	"Drop It"	Eliminated
9	Effemme	"Half Full Glass"	Second chance
10	Eklettika	"Occhi viola"	Eliminated
11	Elis	"A me"	Eliminated
12	Federubin	"Maddalena"	Eliminated
13	Flat Bit	"Una disco"	Eliminated
14	Gelida	"Occhi di ghiaccio"	Eliminated
15	Junaisinsane	"Don't Care About"	Eliminated
16	Known Physics	"Call My Name"	Eliminated
17	Mad	"Terra rossa"	Eliminated
18	Mirjam	"Io amo"	Eliminated
19	Myky	"Coming Home"	Eliminated
20	Nadine Randle	"What's on Your Mind"	Second chance
21	Only Sara	"Drama Queen"	Eliminated
22	Prima	"Ferma"	Eliminated
23	Raffi	"E poi ti voglio"	Eliminated
24	Sandro Machado	"Mi sangas sen vi"	Second chance
25	Spiros	"C'est ma guerre"	Eliminated
26	Thea	"Nordic Sages"	Eliminated
27	Veronica and Faber	"Strangers"	Eliminated
28	Vincent	"Lalla"	Eliminated
29	Vitania	"Lia"	Eliminated
30	Viva	"Sono come te"	Eliminated

Sammarinese semi-final – 23 February 2024
R/O	Artist	Song	Result
1	Alessia Felici	"Non conviene mai"	Eliminated
2	Francesco Mariani	"Breathe"	Eliminated
3	Gynevra	"Il mio nome"	Eliminated
4	HBH Band	"I Can Be Real"	Eliminated
5	Kida	"Invincibile"	Finalist
6	Why Xes	"Fatti a musica"	Eliminated
—N/a	~~Giulia B.~~	—	Absent

==== Second chance ====
The second chance round was held on 16 February 2024 and aired on 23 February 2024, with three more artists advancing to the final.

Second chance round – 23 February 2024
R/O	Artist	Song	Result
1	Basti	"Rhythm in the Rain"	Eliminated
2	Camellini	"Patchwork"	Eliminated
3	Cinzia Paoletti	"Tallone d'Achille"	Eliminated
4	Corde Libere	"Deserti in viaggio"	Eliminated
5	Dəva	"One Love"	Eliminated
6	Edoardo Brogi	"Magari subito"	Eliminated
7	Effemme	"Half Full Glass"	Eliminated
8	Itama	"Chorizo"	Eliminated
9	Mace	"Vivimi"	Eliminated
10	Masala and Foresta	"Paranoia"	Finalist
11	Megara	"11:11"	Finalist
12	Nadine Randle	"What's on Your Mind"	Eliminated
13	Sandro Machado	"Mi sangas sen vi"	Eliminated
14	Simon Evans	"Anywhere to Go"	Eliminated
15	This Is Elle	"Gold"	Eliminated
16	XGiove	"Nostalgia"	Finalist

==== The San Marino Sessions ====
The San Marino Sessions was an experimental selection launched by SMRTV in collaboration with Casperaki to determine one of the finalists of Una voce per San Marino 2024. From 27 November 2023 until January 2024, interested artists could submit anything from short recordings to complete compositions, with the dedicated platform, powered by artificial intelligence, helping to enhance them. By 9 January 2024, a committee selected the ten best suggestions to take part in a songwriting camp hosted by producers TommyD and Stefan Moessle in London between 18 and 21 January 2024, where they came down to four full compositions; the jury of Una voce per San Marino, helped by feedback from the public, then selected one of these to qualify for the final, announced along the other pre-qualifiers on 19 February 2024.

The San Marino Sessions finalists
Artist	Song	Result
Dana Gillespie	"The Last Polar Bear"	Qualified
Marie Wegener	"Dare to Dream"	Eliminated
Meg Birch	"Neon Rain"	Eliminated
Nicole Silva	"Corazón de mariposa"	Eliminated

==== Final ====
The final of Una voce per San Marino took place on 24 February 2024 and consisted of the eight competing established artists from the semi-finals and second chance round plus the San Marino Sessions qualifier, who had been announced on 19 February 2024 at a press conference in Milan. The winner of the final was Megara with the song "11:11", written by Isra Dante Ramos, Solomando, Roberto la Lueta Ruiz and Sara Jiménez Moral. The professional jury consisted of Celso Valli (chair), Anna Bianchi, Clarissa Martinelli, John Vignola and Steve Lyon. Mogol and Al Bano, who chaired the jury in the two previous editions, made an appearance as guests. Piqued Jacks (2023 winners) opened the show performing their winning entry "Like an Animal", they also performed their new release "Aria" during the interval; Piccolo Coro dell'Antoniano, Riccardo Cocciante and Filippo Graziani also performed as interval acts.

The final also saw several acts receive special awards for their participation. These included the San Marino Outlet Experience prize for the best look to Jalisse, the OGAE Italy prize and the Critics' prize to Loredana Bertè, the Febal Casa prize (awarded by Radio San Marino) for the most radio-friendly song to La Rua, and the Ludovico Di Meo prize (awarded by San Marino RTV) for the best emerging act to Megara.

Final – 24 February 2024
R/O	Artist	Song	Place
1	Pago	"Il protagonista"	17
2	Daudia	"With You"	12
3	XGiove	"Nostalgia"	8
4	Aimie Atkinson	"A Dare for Love"	4
5	Dez	"Freedom"	16
6	Marcella Bella	"Chi siamo davvero"	6
7	Aaron Sibley	"Human"	13
8	Wlady, Corona and Ice MC feat. DJ Jad	"Questa volta"	14
9	Loredana Bertè	"Pazza"	2
10	Kida	"Invincibile"	15
11	Booom!	"Dance like This"	5
12	Jalisse	"Il paradiso è qui"	10
13	Mate	"Big Mama"	9
14	Masala and Foresta	"Paranoia"	11
15	La Rua	"Governo del cuore"	3
16	Dana Gillespie	"The Last Polar Bear"	7
17	Megara	"11:11"	1

=== Promotion and preparation ===
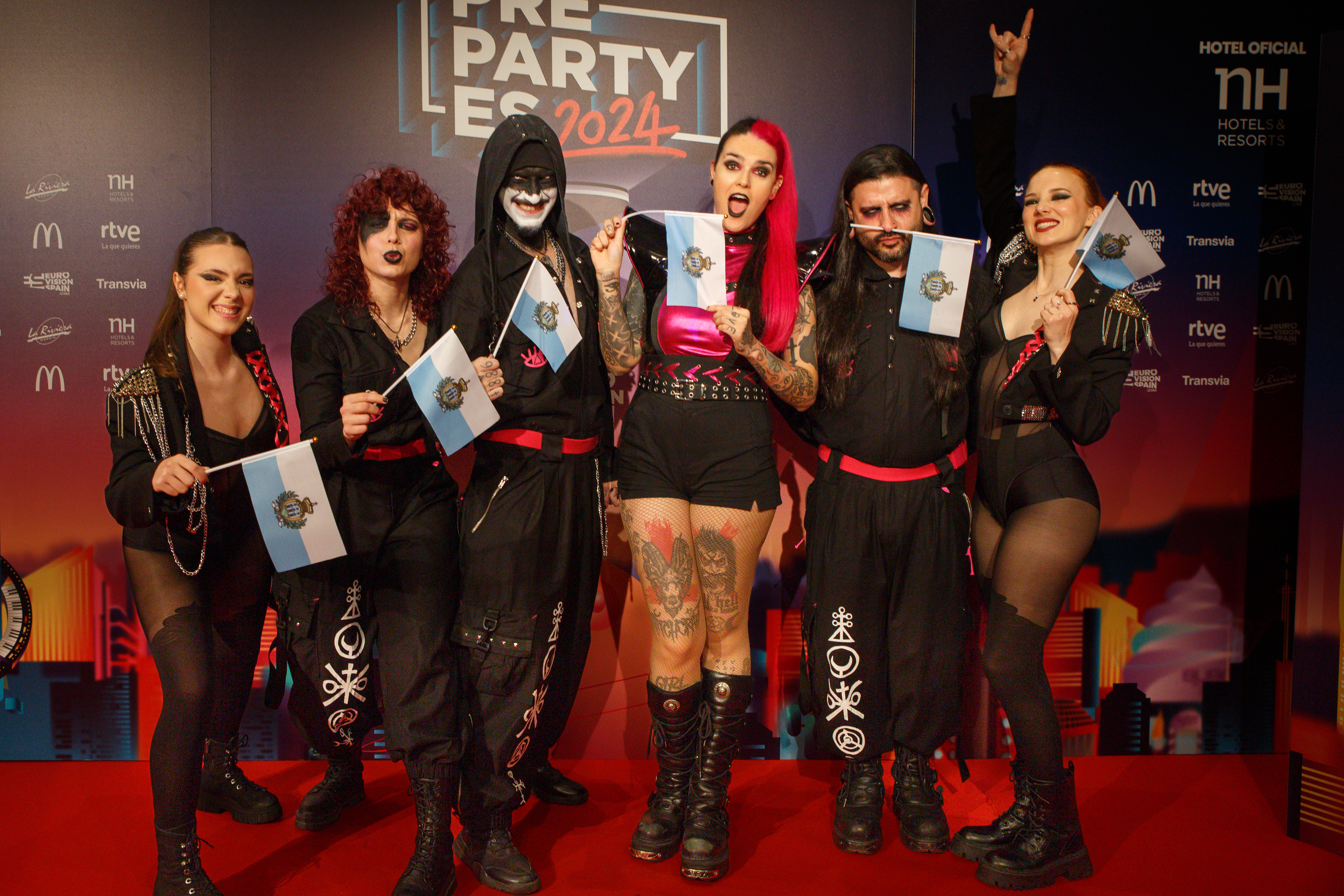
Megara at the PrePartyES event in Madrid

As part of the promotion of their participation in the contest, Megara attended the PrePartyES in Madrid on 30 March 2024, the Barcelona Eurovision Party on 6 April 2024 and the London Eurovision Party on 7 April 2024. This was followed by the Eurovision in Concert event in Amsterdam on 13 April 2024, the Nordic Eurovision Party in Stockholm on 14 April 2024 and the Copenhagen Eurovision Party (Malmöhagen) on 4 May 2024. In late April 2024, "11:11" was revamped in collaboration with producer Jose Pablo Polo ahead of the contest, with the new version to premiere directly at Eurovision.

== At Eurovision ==
The Eurovision Song Contest 2024 took place at the Malmö Arena in Malmö, Sweden, and consisted of two semi-finals held on the respective dates of 7 and 9 May and the final on 11 May 2024. All participating countries, except the host nation and the "Big Five", consisting of France, Germany, Italy, Spain, and the United Kingdom, were required to qualify from one of two semi-finals to compete for the final; the top 10 countries from their respective semi-finals progressed to the final. On 30 January 2024, an allocation draw was held to determine which of the two semi-finals, as well as which half of the show, each country would perform in. The European Broadcasting Union (EBU) split up the competing countries into different pots based on historical voting patterns from previous contests, in an attempt to reduce the likelihood of neighbourly voting and to increase suspense. San Marino was scheduled for the second half of the second semi-final. The shows' producers then decided the running order for the semi-finals; San Marino was set to perform in position 10.

In San Marino, all the shows of the contest were broadcast on San Marino RTV, as well as on the broadcaster's streaming platform RTV Play, with commentary by Lia Fiorio and Gigi Restivo. As part of the Eurovision programming, from 23 April until the contest, SMRTV broadcast Ticket to Eurovision, a show discussing the participating countries.

=== Performances ===
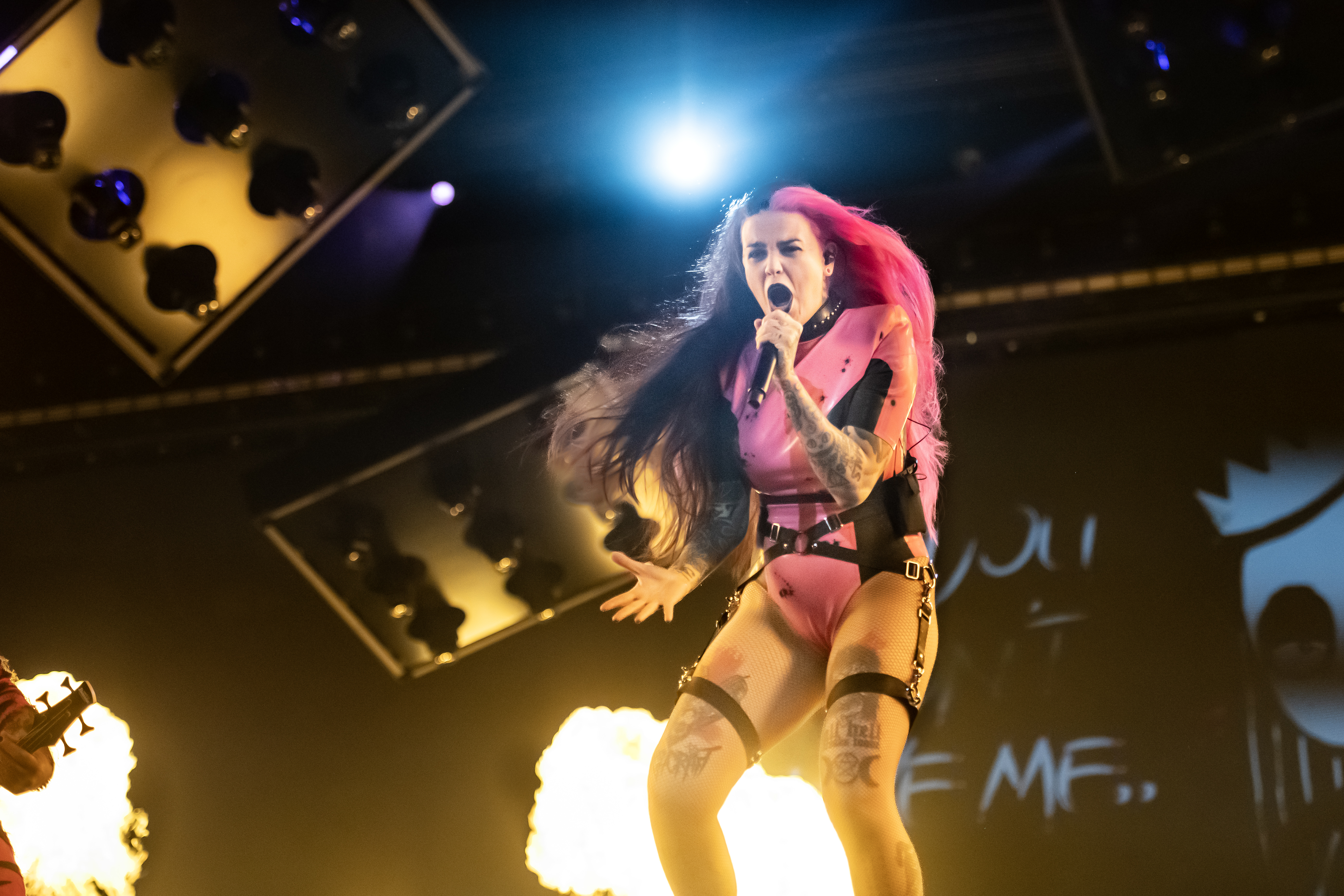
Megara member Kenzy Loevett performing during a dress rehearsal on 8 May 2024.

Megara took part in technical rehearsals on 30 April and 3 May, followed by dress rehearsals on 8 and 9 May. Their performance of "11:11" at the contest was staged by Javier Pageo, who had previously staged the performance for Spain in the 2023 junior contest. It featured black and pink outfits, LED lighting and pyrotechnics. The theme was set around a fantasy world with dragons and trees.

San Marino performed in position 10, following the entry from Latvia and before the entry from Georgia. The country was not announced among the top 10 entries in the semi-final and therefore failed to qualify to compete in the final.

=== Voting ===
Voting during the three shows involved each country awarding sets of points from 1–8, 10 and 12: one from their professional jury and the other from televoting in the final vote, while the semi-final vote was based entirely on the vote of the public. As San Marino shares its telephone system with Italy, the country's jury votes were used during the semi-final, while at the final an aggregate televote created using the televotes of neighbouring countries was used. The Sammarinese jury consisted of Augusto Ciavatta, Viola Conti, Michele Giardi, Nicola Giaquinto, and Camilla Ortolani. These members were music industry professionals who are Sammarinese citizens, and each jury and individual jury member were required to meet a set of EBU criteria regarding professional background and diversity in gender and age. Additionally, no member of the national jury was permitted to be related in any way to any of the competing acts in such a way that they could not vote impartially and independently.

In the second semi-final, San Marino placed 14th with 16 points. Over the course of the contest, San Marino awarded its 12 points to the Switzerland in the second semi-final, and to Switzerland (jury) and Israel (aggregate televote) in the final. Kida served as the Sammarinese spokesperson, announcing the votes awarded by the Sammarinese jury during the final.

==== Points awarded to San Marino ====
Points awarded to San Marino (Semi-final 2)
Score	Televote
12 points	
10 points	Spain
8 points	
7 points	
6 points	
5 points	
4 points	
3 points	Georgia
2 points	Rest of the World
1 point	Italy

==== Points awarded by San Marino ====
Points awarded by San Marino (Semi-final 2)
Score	Jury
12 points	Switzerland
10 points	Netherlands
8 points	Armenia
7 points	Denmark
6 points	Czechia
5 points	Norway
4 points	Malta
3 points	Latvia
2 points	Albania
1 point	Estonia

Points awarded by San Marino (Final)
Score	Aggregated televote	Jury
12 points	Israel	Switzerland
10 points	Ukraine	Italy
8 points	Croatia	Armenia
7 points	Greece	Ireland
6 points	France	Spain
5 points	Switzerland	Portugal
4 points	Cyprus	Finland
3 points	Italy	Cyprus
2 points	Ireland	Sweden
1 point	Lithuania	Germany

==== Detailed voting results ====
Detailed voting results from San Marino (Semi-final 2)
R/O	Country	Jury	
R/O	Country	Rank	Points
01	Malta	7	4
02	Albania	9	2
03	Greece	12	
04	Switzerland	1	12
05	Czechia	5	6
06	Austria	14	
07	Denmark	4	7
08	Armenia	3	8
09	Latvia	8	3
10	San Marino		
11	Georgia	13	
12	Belgium	15	
13	Estonia	10	1
14	Israel	11	
15	Norway	6	5
16	Netherlands	2	10

Detailed voting results from San Marino (Final)
R/O	Country	Jury							Aggregated televote	
R/O	Country	Juror A	Juror B	Juror C	Juror D	Juror E	Rank	Points	Rank	Points
01	Sweden	16	11	3	14	14	10	2	14	
02	Ukraine	26	5	13	25	12	16		2	10
03	Germany	25	7	22	3	20	11	1	23	
04	Luxembourg	7	9	21	12	11	15		18	
~~05~~	~~Netherlands~~ ‡ (Note: The Netherlands was disqualified prior to the final.)	~~20~~	~~10~~	~~2~~	~~2~~	~~5~~	~~3~~		N/A	
06	Israel	11	21	26	26	26	24		1	12
07	Lithuania	5	16	8	15	23	14		10	1
08	Spain	3	23	14	8	8	6	6	13	
09	Estonia	23	22	25	18	10	23		20	
10	Ireland	10	6	9	9	2	5	7	9	2
11	Latvia	13	13	15	20	13	20		12	
12	Greece	17	14	6	23	17	19		4	7
13	United Kingdom	15	18	12	17	15	21		21	
14	Norway	8	8	5	19	22	12		22	
15	Italy	1	1	11	5	1	2	10	8	3
16	Serbia	9	17	23	24	24	22		17	
17	Finland	18	19	16	6	3	8	4	16	
18	Portugal	6	2	19	21	21	7	5	24	
19	Armenia	4	3	4	16	16	4	8	11	
20	Cyprus	14	15	17	4	7	9	3	7	4
21	Switzerland	2	4	1	1	6	1	12	6	5
22	Slovenia	24	20	20	22	18	26		25	
23	Croatia	12	25	24	7	4	13		3	8
24	Georgia	22	24	18	13	25	25		15	
25	France	19	12	7	11	19	17		5	6
26	Austria	21	26	10	10	9	18		19	
