= Enrico Brignano =

Italian actor, playwright, comedian, presenter and writer

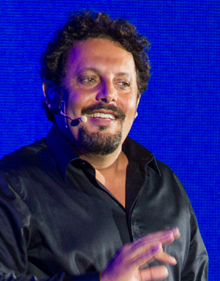
- Born: May 18, 1966 (age 60); Rome, Italy
- Spouse: Flora Canto (m. 2022)
- Children: 2

Comedy career
- Years active: 1999–present
- Medium: Stand-up; television
- Genres: Observational comedy, anecdotal comedy, blue comedy, sketch comedy, surreal humor, stand-up comedy
- Subjects: Italian culture, everyday life, gender differences, human behavior, pop culture, current events

Enrico Brignano (born 18 May 1966) is an Italian actor, playwright, comedian, presenter and writer.

== Life and career ==
Born in Rome, Brignano graduated in 1990 at the Laboratory of Performing Exercises under Gigi Proietti, who later chose him for several of his plays between 1994 and 1997 and as a sidekick in the TV-series Il maresciallo Rocca. After appearing as a comedian in several variety shows, he had his breakout with the role of Giacinto in Un medico in famiglia. Mainly active on stage, he played a number of main roles in TV-series and films, and in 2000 he directed, wrote and starred in the romantic comedy Si fa presto a dire amore.

In 2008, he married dancer Bianca Pazzaglia, from whom he separated in 2013. In 2014, he began a relationship with actress and TV host Flora Canto, with whom he has two children: Martina and Niccolò. The couple got married on July 30, 2022.

== Filmography ==
=== Films ===
Year	Title	Role	Notes
1994	Miracolo italiano	Michele	Segment: "Sesto episodio"
1997	Physical Jerks	Zinna	
1999	La bomba	Sergio	
2000	Si fa presto a dire amore	Enrico	Also director, screenwriter
2001	South Kensington	Francesco	
2007	SMS - Sotto mentite spoglie	Bruno Garrone	
2008	Un'estate al mare	Italo Funaro	
2008	Asterix at the Olympic Games	Reporter	Cameo appearance
2009	Un'estate ai Caraibi	Angelo Cerioni	
2010	La vita è una cosa meravigliosa	Cesare	
2010	Sharm el Sheikh: Un'estate indimenticabile	Fabio Romano	
2011	A Monster in Paris	Raoul (voice)	Italian dub; voice role
2011	Faccio un salto all'Avana	Fedele Diottallevi	
2011	Ex 2: Still Friends?	Marco	
2013	See You Tomorrow	Marcello Santilli	
2013	Frozen	Olaf (voice)	Italian dub; voice role
2013	Stay Away from Me	Jacopo Leone	
2015	Tutte lo vogliono	Orazio Mancini	
2015	Frozen Fever	Olaf (voice)	Short film, Italian dub; voice role
2016	Poveri ma ricchi	Marcello Bertocchi	
2017	Olaf's Frozen Adventure	Olaf (voice)	Short film, Italian dub; voice role
2017	Poveri ma ricchissimi	Marcello Bertocchi	
2019	Tutta un'altra vita	Gianni	
2019	Frozen II	Olaf (voice)	Italian dub; voice role
2023	Da grandi	Adult Marco	
2023	Una commedia pericolosa	Maurilio Fattardi	
2023	Volevo un figlio maschio	Alberto	

=== Television ===
Year	Title	Role	Notes
1990–1991	Club '92	Himself as the Waiter	Variety cabaret show
1993	La sai l'ultima	Himself/co-host	Game show (season 4)
1996	Il maresciallo Rocca	Mario Caleffi	Recurring role (season 1); 4 episodes
1997	Macao	Himself/ Various	Variety cabaret show
1998–2000	Un medico in famiglia	Giacinto Diotallevi	Main role (seasons 1–2); 78 episodes
2002	Saint Anthony: The Miracle Worker of Padua	Giulietto	Television film
2004	Raccontami una storia	Leonardo	Miniseries
2007	Finalmente Natale	Carlo Loiacono	Television film
2007–2010	Zelig	Himself/ Regular performer	Variety show (seasons 11–13)
2007–2008	Pyramid	Himself/host	Game show
2008	VIP	Max Procaccini	Television film
2008	Finalmente a casa	Carlo Loiacono	Television film
2009	Fratelli detective	Francesco Forti	Television film
2011	Un Natale per due	Danilo	Television film
2011	Fratelli detective	Francesco Forti	Lead role; 12 episodes
2011–2012	Le Iene	Himself/co-host	Information/variety show (season 15)
2011–2019	The Amazing World of Gumball	Julius Jr./ Rob/Hot Dog/Calton/ Troy/Vladus Lovus (voice)	Additional voices, Italian dub
2012	I Cesaroni	Flavio Cesaroni	Episode: "Milano andata e ritorno"
2017	60 Zecchini	Himself/Judge	Talent show
