= ERISU =

Italian rock idol group

- Origin: Italy
- Genres: Alternative idol; Sumerian rock; Rock
- Occupation: Band
- Years active: 2020
- Label: Warner Music Italy

ERISU is an Italy-based alternative idol group who have been considered one of the pioneers of being an alternative idol in Europe. They are best known for performing songs in Sumerian. They competed on X Factor and also participated in the San Marino Song Contest 2025 and San Marino Song Contest 2026.

== Group Biography ==
The group formed in Italy in 2020 and were intended to debut at the 2020 Monster of Dolls festival. However, they were hindered by the lockdown. They were inspired by Greek mythology, specifically Eris, the goddess of strife, which the group took their name from, as well as Sumerian mythology, from which the individual members took their names from. They have claimed to be "born from the splitting of the Goddess Eris into mortal fractions" and to be from the planet Nibiru. They have discussed this in connection to the divine feminine. They have been called "pioneers of alternative idol".

They released their first song in October 2020, and their second song just a few weeks later. They released The War On the Great Nothing in 2021. They released EP The Reckless Maneuver of the Four Parts of Eris in 2021.

The group included four members at the beginning, but in July 2021, one member, Mayumi, left. As of April 2023, the group included four members: Aruru from China, NinLil and NenLu from Italy, and NanTu from Venezuela. However, by July 2024, Aruru had left the group and Nunrim, also from Italy, had joined. At this point, they included two contraltos and two sopranos.

They have stated their music has been inspired by Georgian music and Gregorian chant. As of 2024, they include songs in Sumerian. They have claimed to be the first group in the world to include songs entirely in Sumerian.

In 2023, they accompanied singer Rukatama as her opening act. They also appeared at Monster of Dolls that same year.

In 2024, they released their single Ishtar, inspired by the journey of the goddess Ishtar through the underworld. They also released their single ERIS, during which they collaborated with Death SS, which was also discussed as preparation for their album that same year, Heavy Goddesses. That same year, they were nominated in the FemMetal Awards for Best Rock and Alternative Act and Best Music Video. In 2025, they revealed their song Ghost of Ninive at Lucca Comics & Games.

They submitted their song The Mighty Wall of Uruk, which is entirely in Sumerian, in a part of Heavy Goddesses, for the San Marino Song Contest 2025 and were selected to compete, but were ultimately eliminated in the semi-finals. Their song Ghost of Ninive was submitted to the San Marino Song Contest in 2026, and made it through the Stage and Live Academy round, but ultimately did not qualify for the final. They also auditioned for X Factor. Although they didn't pass the round, they were dubbed "indimencamente", or unforgettable.

During their live shows, they have performed a ritual to awaken the third eye, including fake blood. They are signed to HiQu Music and distributed by Warner Music Italy.

== Discography ==
Album

- Heavy Goddesses (2024)

EP

- The Reckless Maneuver of the Four Parts of Eris

Single

- Ghost of Ninive (2025)
- Ishtar (2024)
- Principia Discordia (2023)
- Let the Sabbath Begin (cover) (2023)
- The War on the Great Nothing (2021)
