= Neshe =

Turkish singer, actress and dancer

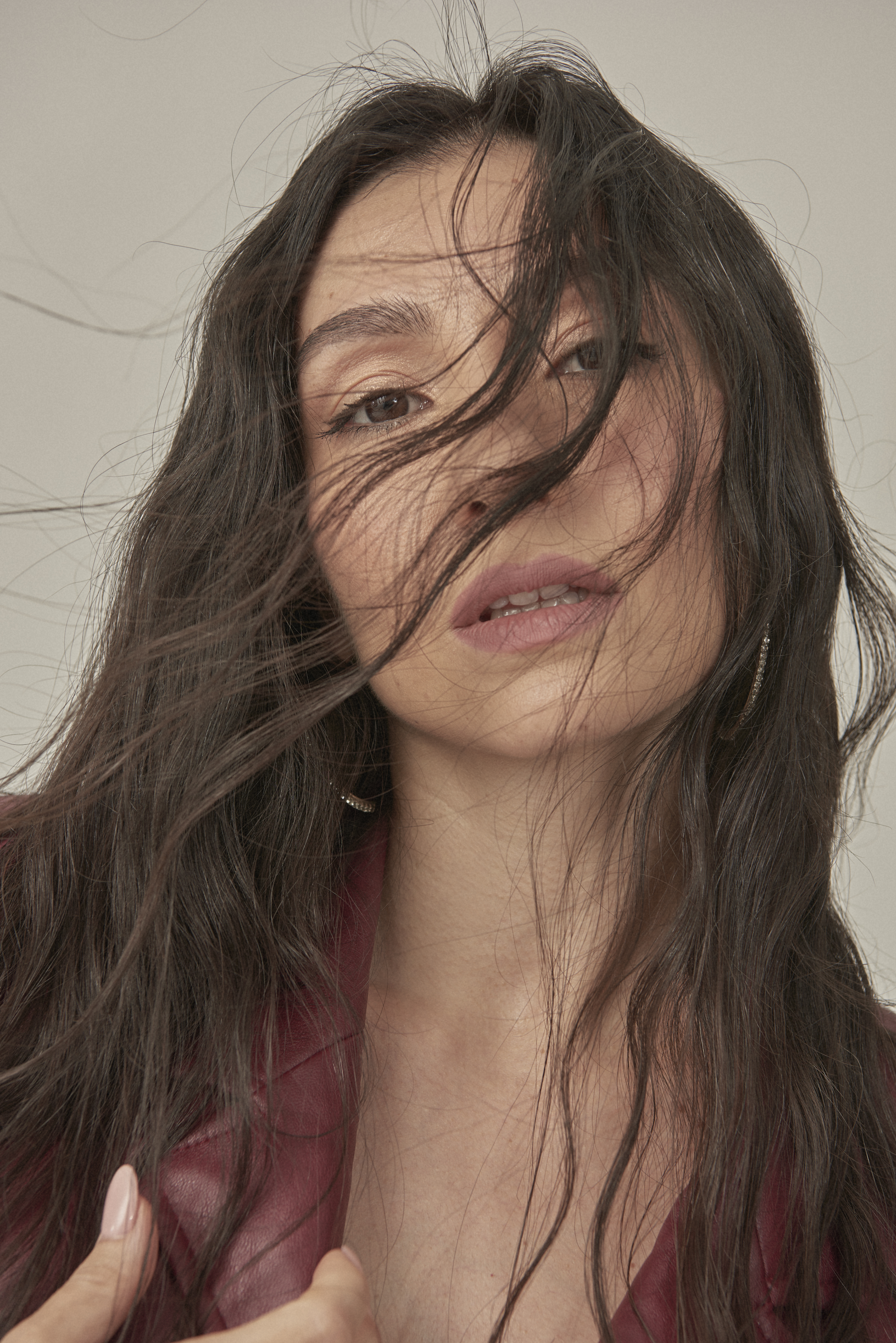
- Neshe in 2020
- Born: Neşe Ceren Aktay; 13 January 1990 (age 36); Istanbul, Turkey
- Occupations: Singer; songwriter; dancer; actress
- Years active: 2006–present
- Musical career
- Genres: Latin pop; Ethnic music
- Instruments: Voice, piano
- Label: Sony Music Turkey
- Website: Official website

Neşe Ceren Aktay (born 13 January 1990), known professionally as Neshe, is a Turkish singer, songwriter, actress, and dancer. Born and raised in Istanbul, Turkey, Neshe is known for her blend of Latin pop and ethnic music styles.

== Early life and education ==
Neşe Ceren Aktay was born in Istanbul and started engaging in the arts at a young age, focusing on ballet, dance, theater, and music. She graduated from Mimar Sinan University State Conservatory with a degree in Modern Dance and from Istanbul University State Conservatory with a degree in Musical Theater. She began her stage career during her Erasmus program at Institut del Teatre in Barcelona.

== Career ==
During her career she performed in musicals such as Footloose in the United States and Notre Dame, Nine, Chicago, and Cabaret in Europe. She also performed as an actress with Istanbul City Theatres and later became a soloist at the Enbe Orchestra.

Neshe's music career began with the release of her debut single Hijo de la Noche in November 2020. The song, a collaboration with Jimmy Dub, received attention in Latin America, Spain, and the Balkans. Its music video, shot in Mardin, Turkey, showcased a mix of Latin and Turkish elements and got over a million views on YouTube.

Her first Turkish single, Bingo, launched in 2023, was produced by Neneto and co-written by Romanian composer Emanuela Oancea. On August 2nd 2024, Neshe released her single Downtown, an English / Spanish version of Bingo.

Neshe participated in the semifinals of the San Marino Song Contest 2025, the national selection process for San Marino’s representative at the Eurovision Song Contest 2025. She competed with the song Fallin', which has been officially released on February 28, 2025.
