= Megara (band) =

Spanish band

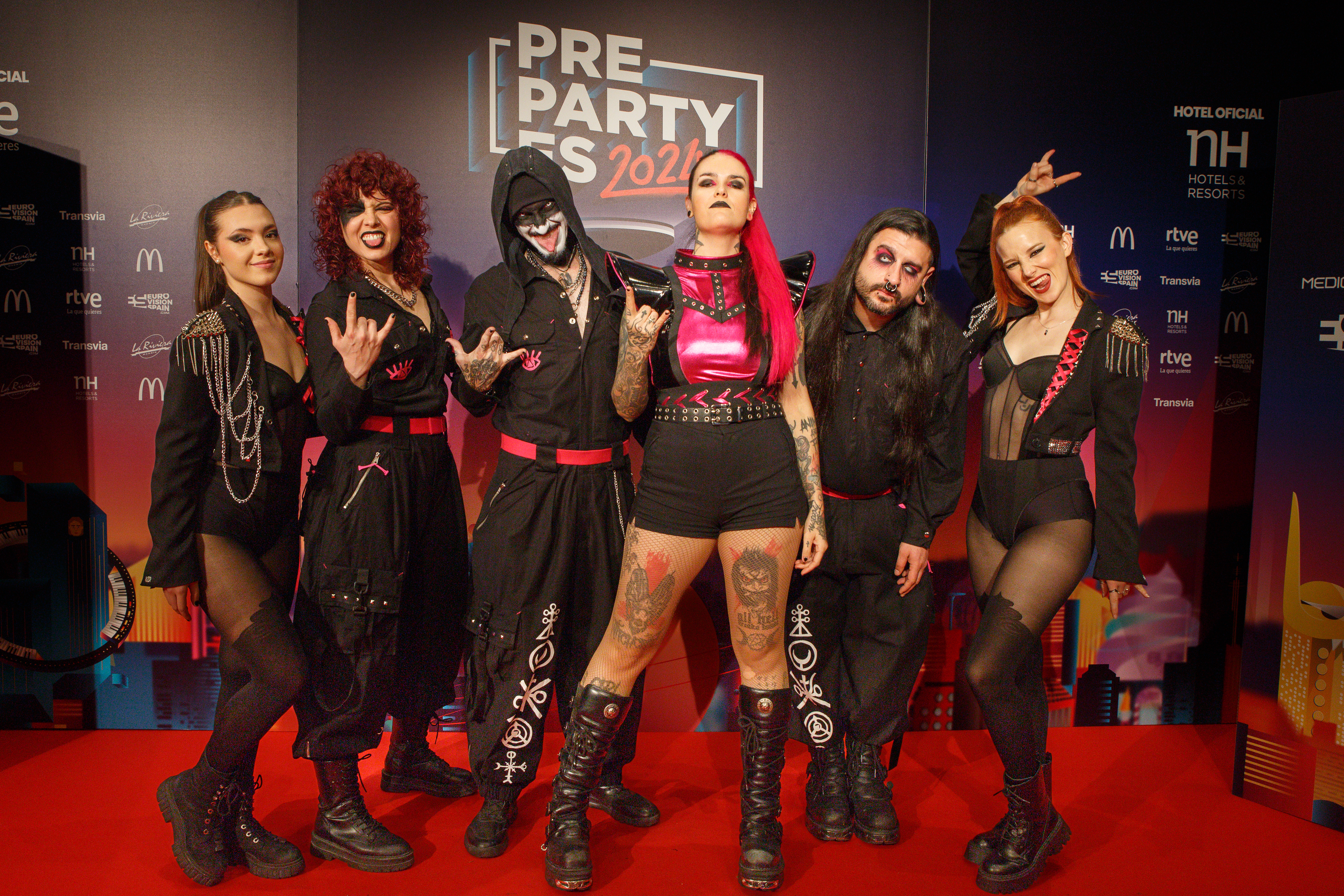
- Megara in 2024

Background information
- Origin: Madrid, Spain
- Genres: "Fucksia rock"; alternative metal
- Years active: 2015–present
- Members: Kenzy Loevett; Dim; Tio Rober Bueno; Nelson Valenzuela; Kat Almagro (for Eurovision Song Contest 2024)
- Past members: Vitti Crocutta; Raphaela Tache
- Website: megaraband.com

Megara (Spanish pronunciation: [meˈɣaɾa]) is a Spanish rock band formed in Madrid in 2015, currently consisting of Kenzy Loevett, Dim, Tio Rober Bueno, and Nelson Valenzuela. They represented San Marino in the Eurovision Song Contest 2024 with the song "11:11". They failed to qualify in the second semi-final, getting 14th place. It was the third time in a row that the country failed to qualify for the final. During Eurovision Song Contest 2024, Kat Almagro joined the band as a drummer.

== History ==
Megara was formed in Madrid in 2015 by guitarist Rober and vocalist Kenzy. That same year, the band released their debut EP Muérase quien pueda. In 2016, they released Siete, their first studio album. After the publication of their second studio album Aquí estamos todos locos in 2018, the band began rising in popularity, making their debut appearances at Download Festival and Resurrection Fest in 2019.

=== Benidorm Fest 2023 ===
In 2023, the band participated in Benidorm Fest 2023, the Spanish preselection for the Eurovision Song Contest 2023 with the song "Arcadia". They finished fourth in the first semi-final on 31 January 2023, qualifying for the final, where they finished in fourth overall. That same year, they announced that they would be the supporting act on the Spanish leg of Babymetal's World Tour.

=== Eurovision Song Contest 2024 ===
In 2024, the band participated in the Sammarinese preselection Una Voce per San Marino 2024 with the song "11:11". The song was originally intended to compete in Benidorm Fest 2024, but was not selected by broadcaster RTVE. To comply with Sammarinese selection regulations, verses in the Italian language were added. They competed in the second semi-final, and, after qualifying to the second chance round on 23 February 2024, advanced to the final. They were declared the winners of the competition by a five-member professional jury, and were thus selected to represent the country in the Eurovision Song Contest 2024. They failed to qualify from the second semi-final on 9 May 2024, placing 14th out of 16 with 16 points.

== Musical style ==
The band have cited their musical style as "fucksia rock", a combination of electronic, dance and rock genres. The band stated that they coined the term out of disdain of being put into one genre, with Rober Bueno stating in an interview, "we didn't see ourselves pigeonholed into any [genres]... [it] encompasses several styles. We like pop or rock and we express our tastes in our songs. And it has a mix of all that". In another interview, the band described their music as "the perfect mix between the sinister and cotton candy".

== Discography ==
=== Studio albums ===
Title	Details
Siete	Released: 23 May 2016; Label: On Fire Records, JBC Music; Formats: Digital download, streaming
Aquí todos estamos locos	Released: 15 January 2018; Label: On Fire Records, JBC Music; Formats: Digital download, streaming
Truco o trato	Released: 28 October 2022; Label: On Fire Records, JBC Music; Formats: Digital download, streaming
Año cero	Released: 30 January 2026; Label: Virgin; Formats: Digital download, streaming

=== Extended plays ===
Title	Details
Muérase quien pueda	Released: 1 July 2015; Label: On Fire Records, JBC Music; Formats: Digital download, streaming
Truco o trato (Capítulo I)	Released: 1 March 2021; Label: On Fire Records / JBC Music; Formats: Digital download, streaming
Pink Side	Released: 29 March 2021; Label: On Fire Records, JBC Music; Formats: Digital download, streaming
Truco o trato (Capítulo II)	Released: 13 May 2022; Label: On Fire Records, JBC Music; Formats: Digital download, streaming

=== Singles ===
==== As lead artist ====
Title	Year	Album or EP
"Truco o trato"	2020	Truco o trato
"Ni contigo ni sin ti"	2021	Truco o trato
"Náufrago"	2021	Mester de Juglaría
"Medusa"	2022	Truco o trato
"Estanque de tormentas"	2022	Truco o trato
"Hocus Pocus"	2022	Truco o trato
"Arcadia"	2022	Truco o trato
"11:11"	2024	Año cero
"Cicatrices"	2025	Año cero
"13 razones"	2025	Año cero
"4ño c3ro"	2025	Año cero
"Oniria"	2025	Año cero
"Boom Boom Bah"	2026	Año cero
"Dime quién hay"	2026	Año cero

==== As featured artist ====
Title	Year	Album or EP
"Geometría universal" (Arcano Boreal featuring Megara)	2022	Atlas

Awards and achievements
Preceded by Piqued Jacks with "Like an Animal"	San Marino in the Eurovision Song Contest; 2024	Succeeded by Gabry Ponte with "Tutta l'Italia"
