= 11:11 (Megara song) =

2024 single by Megara

Single by Megara

from the album Año cero
- Released: 15 February 2024
- Genre: Electro-rock
- Length: 3:00
- Label: Indica
- Songwriters: Roberto la Lueta Ruiz; Sara Jiménez Moral
- Producer: Isra Dante Ramos Solomando

Megara singles chronology
"Arcadia" (2022)	"11:11" (2024)	"Dancing Queen" (2024)

Music video
- "11:11" on YouTube

Eurovision Song Contest 2024 entry
- Country: San Marino
- Artist: Megara
- Language: Spanish
- Composers: Roberto la Lueta Ruiz; Sara Jiménez Moral
- Lyricists: Roberto la Lueta Ruiz; Sara Jiménez Moral

Finals performance
- Semi-final result: 14th
- Semi-final points: 16

Entry chronology
- ◄ "Like an Animal" (2023)
- "Tutta l'Italia" (2025) ►

Official performance video
- "11:11" (Second Semi-Final) on YouTube

"11:11" (Spanish pronunciation: [ˈonθe j ˈonθe]) is a song by Spanish alternative rock band Megara, written and produced by Issa Dante Ramos Solomando, Roberto la Lueta Ruiz, and Sara Jiménez Moral, and released on 15 February 2024 by Indica Entertainment. "11:11" was the Sammarinese entry for the Eurovision Song Contest 2024, held in Malmö.

== Background and composition ==
"11:11" was produced by Issa Dante Ramos Solomando, and written and composed by Roberto la Lueta Ruiz and Sara Jiménez Moral. In a press release, the band stated that the song was written over the course of a "few days" with the intent of doing something that the band had never musically composed before. The song's title itself relates to an "angel number" tied to "spiritual awakening, self-awareness, and personal growth". In analyses by ESC Kompakt and Wiwibloggs, it is described as a rock song that has "hints" of flamenco guitar. The song itself is inspired by the band's experiences, telling its detractors in a "fuck off message", particularly by including the phrase "me la pela" (transl. I don't give a fuck), that despite trying to break their hearts, they will still be loved by others.

The band previously made bids to enter the Eurovision Song Contest in 2022 and 2023 to represent Spain; both were unsuccessful. According to the band, the band initially entered Benidorm Fest 2024 but weren't chosen. In a last-ditch attempt, the band decided to enter Una Voce per San Marino 2024 for a chance to win a bid for the Eurovision Song Contest 2024.

== Music video and promotion ==
An accompanying music video for the song was released on 21 February 2024, with the video being directed by Javier Bragada. The video features the group in an office space perform in front of two executives, with the band eventually tying and gagging the executives.

To further promote the song, the band announced their intentions to participate in various Eurovision pre-parties, including the Nordic Eurovision Party 2024, the London Eurovision Party 2024, the Barcelona Eurovision Party 2024, and Pre-Party ES 2024.

== Eurovision Song Contest ==
=== Una voce per San Marino 2024 ===
San Marino's broadcaster San Marino RTV (SMRTV) organized a 129-entry competition, Una voce per San Marino 2024, to select its entrant for the Eurovision Song Contest 2024. The competition consisted of four 30 or 31-song semi-finals for foreign artists, a separate semi-final for Sanmarinese artists, and another separate semi-final composed entirely of AI-generated songs. In each of the six semi-finals, one entry qualified directly to the grand final. In the four foreign entry semi-finals, four songs advanced to a second chance round. In the second chance round, four songs directly advanced to a 17-song grand final, where a further eight entries that qualified automatically to the grand final were added. In the final, the winner was chosen solely by juries.

Megara were officially announced as participants in the competition on 30 January 2024. They were drawn to perform 23rd in the second foreign entry semi-final, and qualified to the second chance round. They were able to qualify to the grand final from the second chance round, and were later drawn to perform 17th in the grand final. When the results were announced at the end of the competition, the song was announced to have won, therefore giving the song the rights to represent San Marino in the Eurovision Song Contest 2024.

=== At Eurovision ===
The Eurovision Song Contest 2024 took place at the Malmö Arena in Malmö, Sweden, and consisted of two semi-finals held on the respective dates of 7 and 9 May and the final on 11 May 2024. During the allocation draw on 30 January 2024, San Marino was drawn to compete in the second semi-final, performing in the second half of the show. Megara was later drawn to perform tenth in the semi-final, ahead of Latvia's Dons and behind Georgia's Nutsa Buzaladze.

Megara competed with a revamped version of "11:11", created in collaboration with producer Jose Pablo Polo, which premiered directly at the contest.

== Release history ==
Release history and formats for "11:11"
Country	Date	Format(s)	Version	Label	Ref.
Various	15 February 2024	Digital download; streaming	Original	Indica Entertainment	
Various	23 April 2024	Digital download; streaming	Brais remix	Indica Entertainment	
Various	28 June 2024	Digital download; streaming	Eurovision version	Indica Entertainment	
