= Stay Away from Me =

- Film poster
- Italian: Stai lontana da me
- Directed by: Alessio Maria Federici
- Starring: Enrico Brignano; Ambra Angiolini
- Cinematography: Massimiliano Gatti
- Music by: Giuliano Taviani
- Release date: 14 November 2013
- Running time: 100 minutes
- Country: Italy
- Language: Italian

Stay Away from Me (Italian: Stai lontana da me) is a 2013 Italian romantic comedy film written and directed by Alessio Maria Federici. It is a remake of the French comedy film La Chance de ma vie.

== Cast ==
- Enrico Brignano as Jacopo Leone
- Ambra Angiolini as Sara
- Anna Galiena as Lorenza Bra
- Giampaolo Morelli as Mirko
- Fabio Troiano as Fabrizio
- Giorgia Cardaci as Sofia
- Giorgio Colangeli as Jacopo's father
- Gianna Paola Scaffidi as Jacopo's mother
- Michela Andreozzi as Silvia
- Fabrizia Sacchi as Simona
