= Fratelli detective (TV series) =

- Country of origin: Italy

Fratelli detective is an Italian television series.

== Plot ==
Francesco Forti, Chief Inspector of Police, is passionate about his job but always grappling with difficult cases and with a il-tempered Commissioner. His brother Lorenzo is only eleven years old and has an above-average IQ; with his special intuition, he often ends up helping his older brother in solving the most complicated investigations.

== See also ==
- List of Italian television series
