= Tutta l'Italia =

2025 song by Gabry Ponte

Single by Gabry Ponte
- Language: Italian
- Released: 31 January 2025
- Genre: Dance
- Length: 2:57
- Label: Gekai; Warner
- Composers: Gabry Ponte; Edwyn Roberts
- Lyricists: Andrea Bonomo; Edwyn Roberts
- Producer: Gabry Ponte

Gabry Ponte singles chronology
"Deep Fear" (2025)	"Tutta l'Italia" (2025)	"Exotica" (2025)

Music video
- "Tutta l'Italia" on YouTube

Eurovision Song Contest 2025 entry
- Country: San Marino
- Artist: Gabry Ponte
- Language: Italian
- Composers: Gabry Ponte; Edwyn Roberts
- Lyricists: Andrea Bonomo; Edwyn Roberts

Finals performance
- Semi-final result: 10th
- Semi-final points: 46
- Final result: 26th
- Final points: 27

Entry chronology
- ◄ "11:11" (2024)
- "Superstar" (2026) ►

"Tutta l'Italia" (lit. 'All of Italy') is a 2025 song by Italian DJ and producer Gabry Ponte, with uncredited vocals performed by Andrea Bonomo. It was released through Gekai and Warner on 31 January 2025, and was used as the official theme song for the Sanremo Music Festival 2025. It later won the San Marino Song Contest and represented the country at the Eurovision Song Contest 2025.

The song combines electronic and dance beats with elements of Italian song and tradition, such as the accordion, tarantella, and references to Italian pop culture. It reached number fourteen on the Italian singles chart.

== Music video ==
The music video for "Tutta l'Italia", directed by Attilio Cusani, was released on 15 February 2025 via Ponte's YouTube channel. The same year on 13 March, it was also released on the official Eurovision YouTube channel. The video contains Ponte DJing the song as people dance around him in a plain white room, one of which is wearing an Achraf Hakimi shirt.

== Charts ==
=== Weekly charts ===
Weekly chart performance for "Tutta l'Italia"
Chart (2025)	Peak position
Greece International (IFPI)	94
Iceland (Tónlistinn)	27
Italy (FIMI)	14
Italy Airplay (EarOne)	23
Lithuania (AGATA)	32
Lithuania Airplay (TopHit)	25
San Marino Airplay (SMRTV Top 50)	41
Sweden (Sverigetopplistan)	91

=== Monthly charts ===
Monthly chart performance for "Tutta l'Italia"
Chart (2025)	Peak position
Lithuania Airplay (TopHit)	57

=== Year-end charts ===
Year-end chart performance for "Tutta l'Italia"
Chart (2025)	Position
Italy (FIMI)	45

== Certifications ==
Certifications for "Tutta l'Italia"
Region	Certification	Certified units/sales
Italy (FIMI)	Platinum	200,000^{‡}
^{‡} Sales+streaming figures based on certification alone.
