= San Marino RTV (TV channel) =

Sammarinese TV channel

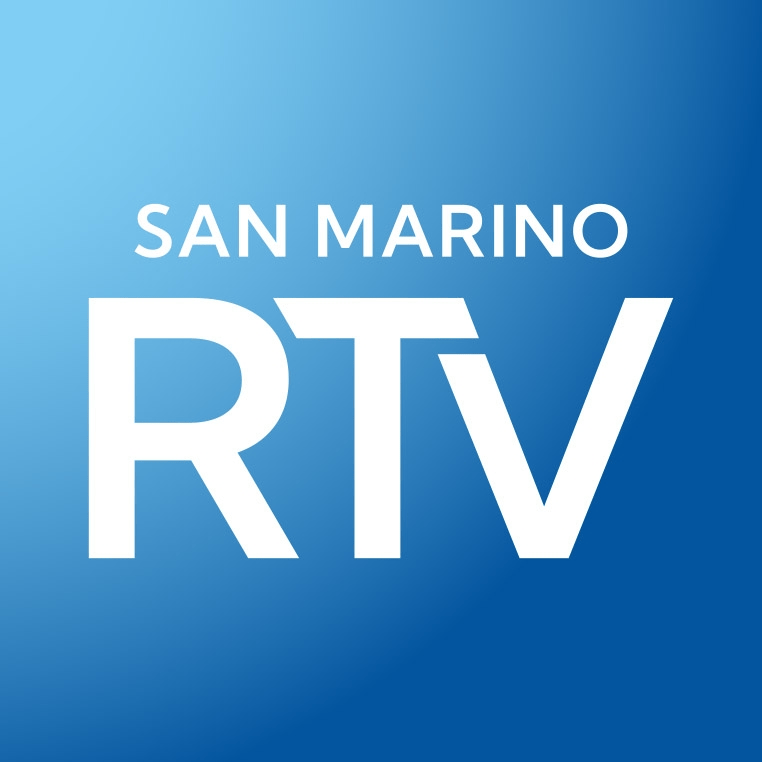
- Country: San Marino
- Headquarters: City of San Marino

Programming
- Language: Italian
- Picture format: 1080i HDTV (downscaled to 576i for the SD feed)

Ownership
- Owner: San Marino RTV
- Sister channels: San Marino RTV Sport

History
- Launched: 24 April 1993 (experimental); 28 February 1994; 32 years ago
- Former names: SMtv San Marino (2011–13)

Links
- Website: www.sanmarinortv.sm

Availability

Terrestrial
- Digital terrestrial television (San Marino and Italy): Channel 550

San Marino RTV is a Sammarinese free-to-air television channel owned and operated by public broadcaster Radiotelevisione della Repubblica di San Marino (SMRTV). It is the company's flagship television channel, and is known for broadcasting news bulletins and self-produced entertainment programming.

It was launched on 28 February 1994 and it was branded as "SMtv San Marino" between 2011 and 2013.

== Programming ==
The channel mostly shows self-produced entertainment programming. It is a member of the European Broadcasting Union (organizer of the Eurovision Song Contest) and the Italian television syndication K2. It also offers a teletext service named San Marino Video.

=== Eurovision Song Contest ===
San Marino RTV is responsible for the Sammarinese participation in the Eurovision Song Contest. The country debuted in 2008 with Miodio and placed last in the first semi-final. After RAI, SMRTV also announced its comeback in the Eurovision Song Contest 2011. It reached the final in 2014 with the song "Maybe" by Valentina Monetta, in 2019 with the song "Say Na Na Na" by Serhat and in 2021 with "Adrenalina" by Senhit (featuring Flo Rida). Gabry Ponte also qualified to the final in 2025, with the song 'Tutta L'Italia'. In 2022 and 2023, the channel used the format Una Voce per San Marino to select its Eurovision entries with the final taking place at the Teatro Nuovo in Dogana. In August 2023, the broadcaster confirmed that the same national final would also be used in 2024. The national final was renamed to 'San Marino Song Contest' from 2025.
