= San Marino RTV =

Public service broadcaster of San Marino

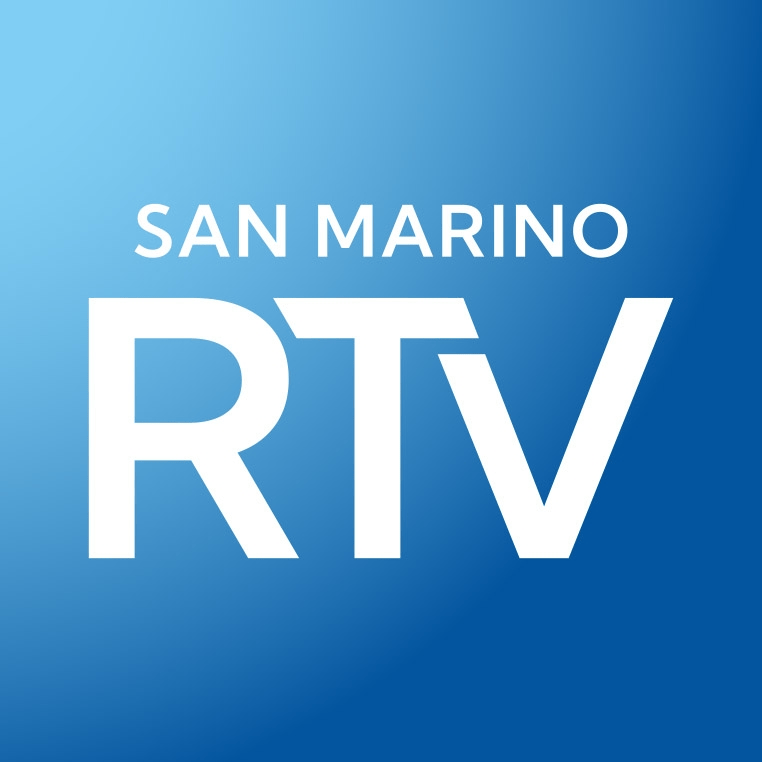
- Type: Public broadcasting
- Country: San Marino
- Availability: San Marino, Italy
- Founded: August 1991; 34 years ago
- Owner: 50% RAI; 50% ERAS
- Key people: Roberto Sergio (president)
- Former names: SMtv San Marino (2011–2013)
- Official website: sanmarinortv.sm

Radiotelevisione della Repubblica di San Marino, commonly known as San Marino RTV (abbreviated SMRTV), is the public service broadcaster of San Marino. On 13 June 2011, San Marino RTV changed its name to SMtv San Marino. In November 2013, the name was changed back to San Marino RTV.

The broadcaster currently operates two television channels (San Marino RTV and San Marino RTV Sport) and two radio stations (Radio San Marino and Radio San Marino Classic).

== History ==
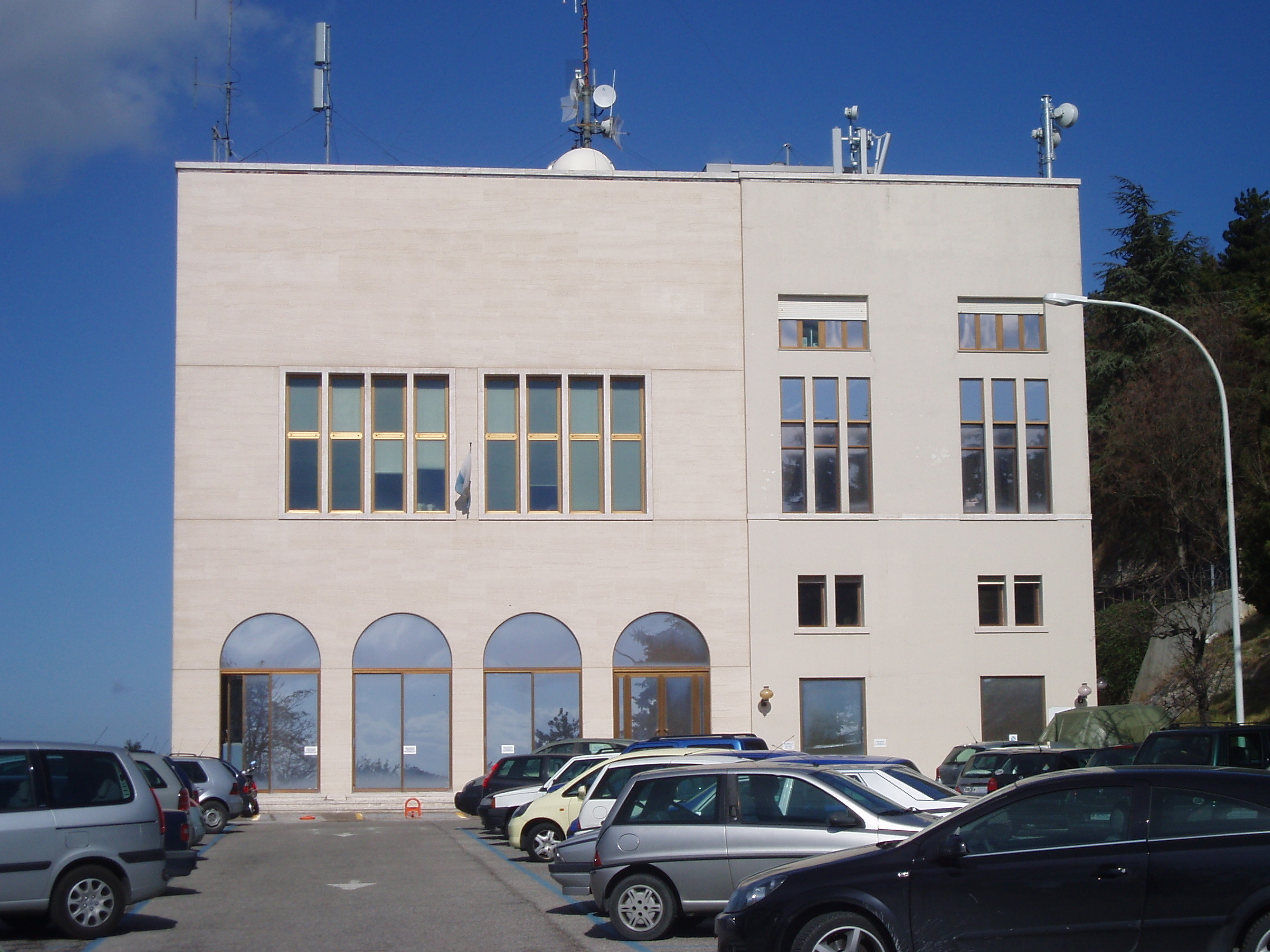
Seat of the presidency and general management of SMRTV in San Marino; John F. Kennedy Avenue, 13

San Marino RTV was founded in August 1991 thanks to a share capital of Ente per la Radiodiffusione Sammarinese (ERAS, San Marino Broadcasting Company) and the Italian public service broadcaster, RAI. Both participated with 50% of the capital. The agreement between both parties is subject to periodic reviews to guarantee and update the public service broadcasting objectives. San Marino RTV broadcasts in Italian, the official language of San Marino.

Experimental radio broadcasts began on 27 December 1992. On 28 February 1993, Radio San Marino was launched broadcasting 24 hours a day. Experimental television broadcasts began on 24 April 1993. On 28 February 1994 a regular television service was launched, broadcasting from 10:00 A.M. to 2:00 A.M.

In July 1995, San Marino RTV became a full member of the European Broadcasting Union (EBU). The establishment is also a founding member of the (C.R.I., Italian speaking radio and television broadcasting community).

In 2007, San Marino RTV started expressing interest in entering the Eurovision Song Contest. On 27 November 2007, it was announced that San Marino would make its debut at the Eurovision Song Contest 2008, held in Belgrade, Serbia. After having been absent in the 2009 and 2010 contests due to financial problems, San Marino reached the final for the first time in the 2014 contest.

In 2011, San Marino RTV attempted to participate in the Junior Eurovision Song Contest, but decided to withdraw in October of that year. On 25 October 2013, it was announced that San Marino would make its debut at the 2013 contest, held in Kyiv, Ukraine.

On 11 October 2014, the channel opened an office in Rome with correspondent Francesca Billotti.

From 22 December 2016 San Marino RTV has been broadcasting in high definition on digital terrestrial, and since 22 February 2018 it has also been broadcasting in HD on satellite.

Starting 20 October 2021, the channel began broadcasting throughout Italy on channel 831 in MPEG-4 SD on RAI Mux B. In December of the same year, Ludovico Di Meo was appointed General Manager of San Marino RTV, a position he held to 29 January 2023.

== Services ==
=== Radio ===
- Radio San Marino (102.7 FM): San Marino's first national radio station, broadcast since 27 December 1992. Its programming is generalist, with special attention to information.
- Radio San Marino Classic (103.2 FM): Music station created in June 2004 that plays classic pieces of Italian and international music. It also broadcasts the matches of the San Marino Football League and sessions of the Grand and General Council.

On its website, you can listen to the signal live and download the programs through a podcast service.

=== Television ===
- San Marino RTV: Generalist channel that is broadcast 24 hours a day. Its programming focuses on news, documentaries, films, cultural and sporting events in San Marino. Since 2018, San Marino RTV has broadcasts in HD on the digital terrestrial channel 573.
- San Marino RTV Sport: Programming includes live events, news, and interviews.

== Logo history ==
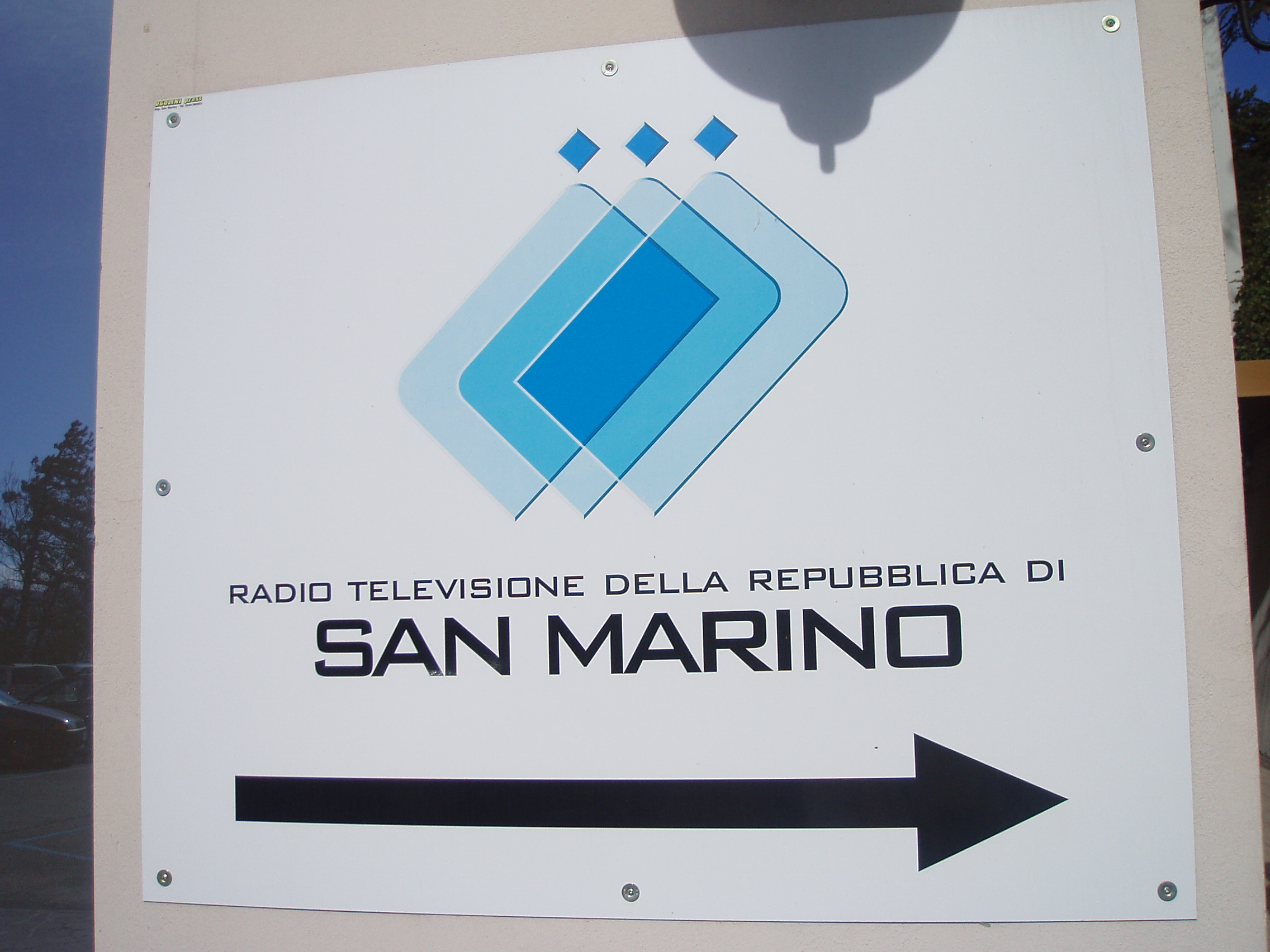
Logo used from 1994 to 12 June 2011

Logo used from November 2013 to 31 January 2021

Logo used from 1 February 2021 to 14 June 2025

== See also ==
- RAI
- List of Italian-language television channels
