= El Desperado =

El Desperado may refer to:

- El Desperado (wrestler), Japanese professional wrestler
- El Desperado (album), an album by Let 3
- The Dirty Outlaws, also known as El desperado, 1967 Italian Spaghetti Western

== See also ==
- Desperado (disambiguation)
