= Harmonija Disonance =

Croatian band

- Origin: Zagreb, Croatia
- Genres: Folk
- Years active: 2018–present
- Labels: Universal Music Croatia
- Members: Mira Crnčić; Magdalena Cvitan; Marta Cvitan; Katarina Mandić; Francesca Paleka; Jana Radić; Hana Zdunić

Harmonija Disonance is a Croatian folk music group. The band was formed in 2018, in Zagreb, Croatia. They consist of seven members: Mira Crnčić, Magdalena Cvitan, Marta Cvitan, Katarina Mandić, Francesca Paleka, Jana Radić and Hana Zdunić.

== History ==
Harmonija Disonance formed in 2018 in Zagreb, Croatia. Before professionally releasing songs, the band performed and covered various Croatian folk songs.

The band released their debut single "Zima" on 5 February 2021. It was later confirmed by the song's composer, Bartol Stopić, how the song was rejected from competing at Dora 2021. On 9 December 2022, Harmonija Disonance was announced as one of the 18 participants in Dora 2023, the national contest in Croatia to select the country's Eurovision Song Contest 2023 entry, with the song "Nevera (Lei, lei)", which was released on 20 January 2023 through Universal Music Croatia. They would end up placing second in the competition, behind the winning Let 3 and their song "Mama ŠČ!". "Nevera (Lei, lei)" became the group's first charting entry on the HR Top 40 chart by debuting at #29 on the issue of 6 February 2023.

== Discography ==
=== Singles ===
Title	Year	Peak chart positions	Album
Title	Year	CRO	Album
"Zima"	2021	—	non-album singles
"Nevera (Lei, lei)"	2023	14	non-album singles
"—" denotes a recording that did not chart or was not released in that territory.
