= Barbara Munjas =

Croatian singer

- Born: 7 December 1988 (age 36); Rijeka, SR Croatia, SFR Yugoslavia
- Origin: Ika, Croatia
- Genres: Rock, ethno rock, pop
- Occupations: Singer; songwriter
- Years active: 2007–present
- Labels: Aquarius Records

Barbara Munjas (born 7 December 1988) is a Croatian singer and songwriter. She is most known as the lead vocalist lyricist for the rock band Barbari and former vocalist of the group Gustafi. Munjas began to establish herself as a solo artist with the release of the single "Men" in 2018. In March 2022, Munjas released her debut album Right Place & Right Time through Aquarius Records.

== Life and career ==
Barbara Munjas was born on 7 December 1988 in Rijeka, Croatia and grew up in the nearby town of Ika.

Munjas released her debut single "Ti si tu" in 2007. With "Ti si tu" she participated in Dora 2007. Performing first in the second semi-final with a total of 11 points thus placing 12th, she failed to advance to the final. Later the same year, she joined folk-rock band Gustafi. She was the main female vocalist until she left the band in 2012. A year later, in 2013, Munjas formed the rock band Barbari with her as the lead vocalist. The band released two studio albums, Monfiorenzo underground in 2013 and Santa Barbara in 2014. Since 2018 Munjas has been active as a solo musician. Her debut album Right Place & Right Time was released in 2022 through Aquarius Records. Based on the album's performance, Munjas earned a nomination at the fifth annual Rock&Off Awards in the category "Album of The Year" for it.

Munjas was one of the 18 participants in Dora 2023, the national contest in Croatia to select the country's Eurovision Song Contest 2023 entry, coming eighth with the song "Putem snova". On 15 December 2023, Munjas was again announced as one of the 24 participants in Dora 2024 with the song "Nepobjediva"; She was eliminated from her semi-final on 22 February 2024.

== Discography ==
=== Albums ===
| Title | Details |
|---|---|
| Right Place & Right Time | Released: 14 March 2022; Label: Aquarius Records; Formats: Digital download, streaming |

=== Singles ===
| Title | Year | Peak chart positions | Album |
| Title | Year | CRO | Album |
|---|---|---|---|
| "Ti si tu" | 2007 | — | non-album singles |
| "Men" | 2018 | — | Right Place & Right Time |
| "Right Place & Right Time" | 2019 | — | Right Place & Right Time |
| "Odraz uma do razuma" | 2020 | — | non-album singles |
| "Gone Back" | 2020 | — | Right Place & Right Time |
| "Laž na laž" | 2021 | — | non-album singles |
| "Like I Wanted" | 2021 | — | Right Place & Right Time |
| "Kad tad" | 2021 | — | non-album singles |
| "I Will Be Standing" | 2022 | — | Right Place & Right Time |
| "Farewell" | 2022 | — | Right Place & Right Time |
| "Putem snova" | 2023 | — (Note: "Putem snova" did not enter the HR Top 40, but peaked at number 50 on the regional HR Top 100 (Istra i Primorje) chart.) | non-album singles |
| "Oda mladosti" | 2023 | — | non-album singles |
| "Vesna" | 2023 | — | non-album singles |
| "Nepobjediva" | 2024 | — | non-album singles |
"—" denotes a recording that did not chart or was not released in that territory.

== Awards and nominations ==
| Year | Association | Category | Nominee / work | Result | Ref. |
|---|---|---|---|---|---|
| 2023 | Rock&Off Awards | Album of The Year | Right Place & Right Time | Nominated | |
