= Croatia in the Eurovision Song Contest 2024 =

- Eurovision Song Contest 2024
- Participating broadcaster: Croatian Radiotelevision (HRT)
- Country: Croatia
- Selection process: Dora 2024
- Selection date: 25 February 2024

Competing entry
- Song: "Rim Tim Tagi Dim"
- Artist: Baby Lasagna
- Songwriters: Marko Purišić

Placement
- Semi-final result: Qualified (1st, 177 points)
- Final result: 2nd, 547 points

Participation chronology

Croatia was represented at the Eurovision Song Contest 2024 with the song "Rim Tim Tagi Dim", written and performed by Marko Purišić under his stage name Baby Lasagna. The Croatian participating broadcaster, Croatian Radiotelevision (HRT), organised the national final Dora 2024 to select its entry for the contest.

Croatia was drawn to compete in the first semi-final of the Eurovision Song Contest which took place on 7 May 2024 and was later selected to perform in position 7. At the end of the show, "Rim Tim Tagi Dim" was announced among the top 10 entries of the first semi-final and hence qualified to compete in the final, marking a second consecutive qualification to the final for the country. It was later revealed that Croatia placed first out of the fifteen participating countries in the semi-final with 177 points. In the final, Croatia performed in position 23 and placed second out of the 25 performing countries, scoring a total of 547 points, winning the public televote. This marked Croatia's highest placing in the history of the contest.

== Background ==
Prior to the 2024 contest, Croatian Radiotelevision (HRT) had participated in the Eurovision Song Contest representing Croatia twenty-eight times since its first entry in 1993. Its best result in the contest to this point was fourth, which it achieved on two occasions: in 1996 with the song "Sveta ljubav" performed by Maja Blagdan and in 1999 with the song "Marija Magdalena" performed by Doris Dragović. Following the introduction of semi-finals in 2004, it had this far featured in eight finals out of seventeen participations. In 2023, it qualified to the final (for the first time since 2017) with the song "Mama ŠČ!" by Let 3, finishing in 13th place.

As part of its duties as participating broadcaster, HRT organises the selection of its entry in the Eurovision Song Contest and broadcasts the event in the country. Since first participating in 1993, it has consistently organised the national final Dora in order to select its entry for the contest, except between 2012 and 2018, when the broadcaster either opted out of participation or internally selected its entries. On 14 September 2023, HRT confirmed its participation in the 2024 contest and its intention to continue to use Dora to select its entry.

== Before Eurovision ==
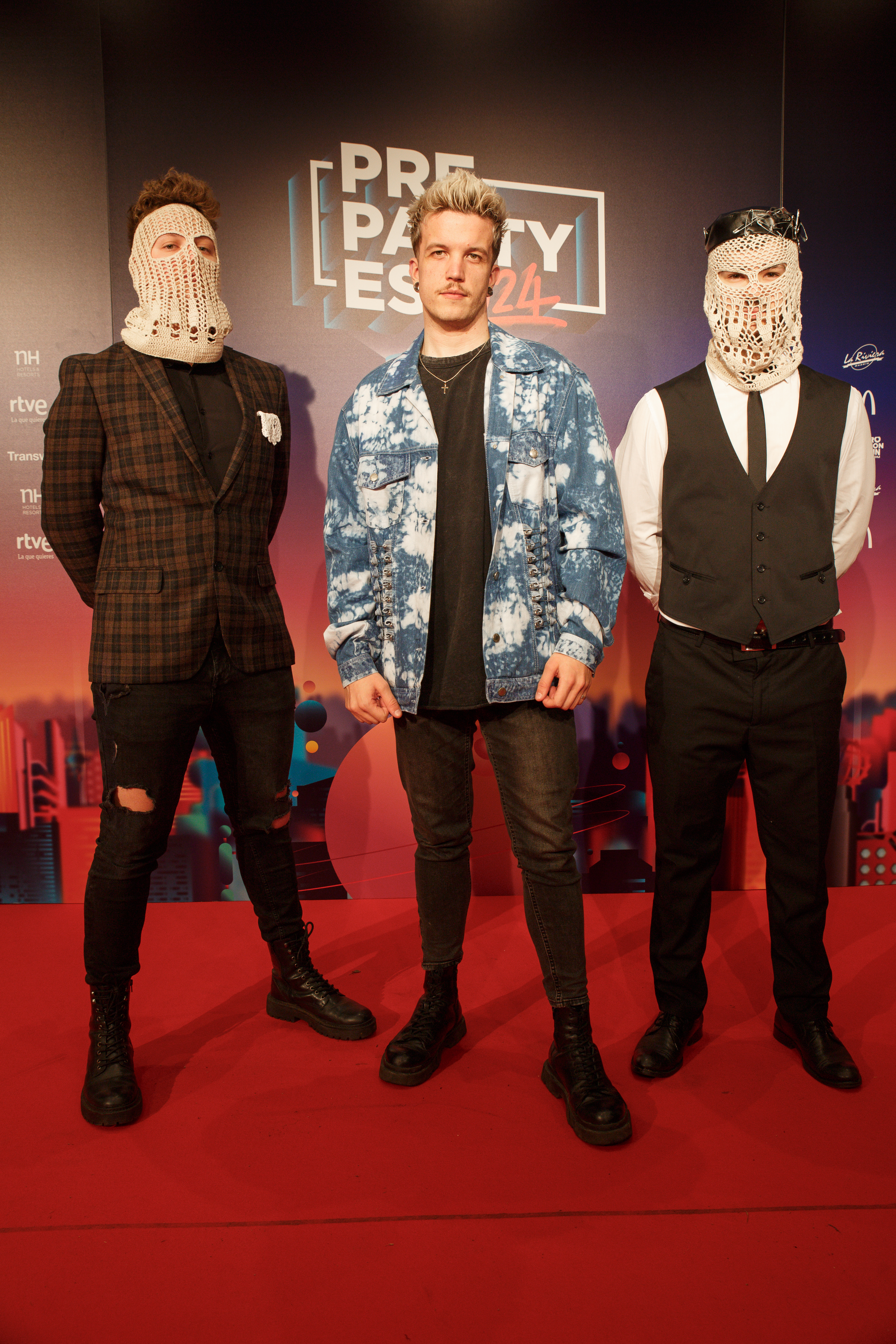
Baby Lasagna, winner of Dora 2024, at the PrePartyES event in Madrid

=== Dora 2024 ===
Dora 2024 was the twenty-fifth edition of Dora, the national final format which selects the Croatian entry for the Eurovision Song Contest. The competition took place at the HRT studios in Zagreb, the first time since 2011 that the contest was not held in Opatija, and was hosted by Duško Čurlić, Maja Ciglenečki and Anja Cerar. It aired on HRT 1, on the streaming service HRTi, as well as on the Croatian radio station HR 2.

==== Format ====
The head of the Croatian delegation to the contest, Tomislav Štengl, initially discussed the possibility of including two semi-finals in addition to the usual final, which was provisionally scheduled for 24 February 2024; it was ultimately decided that the competition would consist of two semi-finals on 22 and 23 February, and a final on 25 February. Twelve entries performed in each semi-final, with eight qualifying for the final based on the results of a public televote. The winner of the final was determined by a 50/50 combination of votes from the public and a jury composed of four national panels – Osijek, Rijeka, Split and Zagreb – and four international panels – Germany, Iceland, Italy and Ukraine; each of these panels consisted of three music industry professionals. The viewers and the juries each had a total of 464 points to award. Each jury group distributed their points following the same pattern used in the Eurovision Song Contest, i.e. 1–8, 10 and 12 points. The viewer vote was based on the percentage of votes each song achieved through telephone and SMS voting; for example, if a song gained 10% of the viewer vote, then that entry would be awarded 10% of 464 points rounded to the nearest integer: 46 points. The stage and set designer for the stage of Dora 2024 was Igor Juras.

==== Competing entries ====
On 15 September 2023, HRT opened a submission period where artists – required to hold Croatian citizenship – and composers were able to submit their entries to the broadcaster until 30 November 2023. At the closing of the window, a record number of 203 entries had been received.

An expert committee reviewed the received submissions and selected twenty-four entries (plus four backups), which were announced on 15 December 2023. The participants included Damir Kedžo and Let 3, who won the competition in 2020 and 2023, respectively. Additionally, Severina, who won the competition in 2006 and represented Croatia in Eurovision the same year, was a backup dancer for Let 3's performance. On 3 January, it was announced that Zsa Zsa had withdrawn for undisclosed reasons; she was replaced by Baby Lasagna. The songs premiered on 4 January 2024 on the program Svijet diskografije on HR 2, and were released on YouTube on 9 January 2024.

Entry withdrawn Replacement entry

Dora 2024 contestants
Artist	Song	Language	Songwriter(s)
Alen Đuras	"A Tamburitza Lullaby"	English	Jimmy Åkerfors; Michel Fannoun; Siniša Reljić-Simba; Tony Malm
Baby Lasagna	"Rim Tim Tagi Dim"	English	Marko Purišić
Barbara Munjas	"Nepobjediva"	Croatian	Barbara Munjas; Zoran Majstorović
Boris Štok	"Can We Talk"	English	Aidan O'Connor; Boris Štok; Darko Terlević; John Doherty
Damir Kedžo	"Voljena ženo"	Croatian	Ante Pecotić
Erna	"How Do You Love Me"	English	Alan Dović; Erna Imamović; Gabor Racz
ET	"Pametnom dosta"	Croatian	Adonis Ćulibrk; Inav Coste
Eugen	"Tišine"	Croatian	Anja Grabovac; Eugen Stjepan Višić
James Night	"Nebo plače"	Croatian	Leonardo Šajin
Lana Mandarić	"More"	Croatian	Lana Mandarić
Lara Demarin	"Ne vjerujem ti"	Croatian	Hrvoje Domazet; Lara Demarin; Luka Demarin; Robert Domitrović
Let 3	"Babaroga"	Croatian	Damir Martinović Mrle; Iztok Turk; Matej Zec; Zoran Prodanović
Lu Dedić	"Plavi leptir"	Croatian	Miro Lesić
Marcela	"Gasoline"	English	Bjørgen van Essen; Daniël van den Brink; Délano Ladurner; Marcela Oroši
Mario Battifiaca feat. Robert Ferlin	"Vodu piti, trizan biti"	Croatian	Bruno Krajcar
Misha	"One Day"	English	Nemanja Filipović
Natalie Balmix	"Dijamanti"	Croatian	Darko Dimitrov; Lazar Cvetkoski; Natalie Balmix; Robert Bilbilov
Noelle	"Baby, Baby"	Croatian	Ivan Zečić; Miroslav Zečić
Pavel	"Do mjeseca"	Croatian	Aljoša Šerić; Jere Šešelja
Saša Lozar	"Ne plačem zbog nje"	Croatian	Ante Pecotić
Stefany	"Sretnih dana dat' će Bog"	Croatian	Branimir Mihaljević; Nenad Ninčević
The Splitters	"Od kad te sanjam"	Croatian	Josip Senta; Petar Senta
Vatra	"Slatke suze, gorka ljubav"	Croatian	Ivan Dečak
Vinko	"Lying Eyes"	English	Srđan Sekulović Skansi; Vinko Ćemeraš
Zsa Zsa	"Probudi usne moje"	Unknown	

Backup entries
#	Artist	Song	Language	Songwriter(s)
1	~~Baby Lasagna~~	~~"Rim Tim Tagi Dim"~~	~~English~~	~~Marko Purišić~~
2	Cota G4	"Stavi se na mjesto"	Unknown	
3	Ether	"Duboko roni"	Unknown	
4	Mihael Kvorka	"Vrati se"	Croatian	Alan Dović; Mihael Kvorka

==== Contest overview ====
===== Semi-finals =====
The two semi-finals took place on 22 February and 23 February 2024 respectively. Slimane, 2024 French entrant, performed as an interval act in the first semi-final, while Raiven, 2024 Slovenian entrant, performed as an interval act in the second semi-final. Natalie Balmix had audio problems in the second semi-final due to technical issues.

Semi-final 1 – 22 February 2024
R/O	Artist	Song	Result
1	Noelle	"Baby, Baby"	—N/a
2	Mario Battifiaca feat. Robert Ferlin	"Vodu piti trizan biti"	Qualified
3	Stefany	"Sretnih dana dat' će Bog"	Qualified
4	Misha	"One Day"	—N/a
5	Erna	"How Do You Love Me"	—N/a
6	Eugen	"Tišine"	Qualified
7	Vinko	"Lying Eyes"	Qualified
8	Barbara Munjas	"Nepobjediva"	—N/a
9	Let 3	"Babaroga"	Qualified
10	Lana Mandarić	"More"	Qualified
11	Pavel	"Do mjeseca"	Qualified
12	Saša Lozar	"Ne plačem zbog nje"	Qualified

Semi-final 2 – 23 February 2024
R/O	Artist	Song	Result
1	Lu Dedić	"Plavi leptir"	—N/a
2	James Night	"Nebo plače"	—N/a
3	Lara Demarin	"Ne vjerujem ti"	Qualified
4	Alen Đuras	"A Tamburitza Lullaby"	Qualified
5	The Splitters	"Od kad te sanjam"	—N/a
6	Boris Štok	"Can We Talk"	Qualified
7	Baby Lasagna	"Rim Tim Tagi Dim"	Qualified
8	ET	"Pametnom dosta"	—N/a
9	Vatra	"Slatke suze, gorka ljubav"	Qualified
10	Damir Kedžo	"Voljena ženo"	Qualified
11	Natalie Balmix	"Dijamanti"	Qualified
12	Marcela	"Gasoline"	Qualified

===== Final =====
The final was held on 25 February 2024 at 20:15 CET and featured the 16 qualifiers from the preceding two semi-finals. The winner, "Rim Tim Tagi Dim" performed by Baby Lasagna, was decided by a combination of votes from a professional jury and the Croatian public via televoting. The interval act of the final saw Let 3 and Jovanka Broz Titutka perform Let 3's Eurovision 2023 entry "Mama ŠČ!", as well as their hit "Ero s onoga svijeta". Over 180,000 votes were cast in the televoting. There were some technical difficulties during the final; Natalie Balmix had issues with her audio, and Boris Štok's performance was delayed due to undisclosed technical issues.

Final – 25 February 2024
R/O	Artist	Song	Jury	Televote	Total	Place
1	Natalie Balmix	"Dijamanti"	24	11	35	10
2	Mario Battifiaca feat. Robert Ferlin	"Vodu piti trizan biti"	0	9	9	15
3	Lana Mandarić	"More"	9	4	13	13
4	Boris Štok	"Can We Talk"	10	13	23	12
5	Stefany	"Sretnih dana dat' će Bog"	3	9	12	14
6	Pavel	"Do mjeseca"	38	15	53	7
7	Saša Lozar	"Ne plačem zbog nje"	1	5	6	16
8	Lara Demarin	"Ne vjerujem ti"	19	6	25	11
9	Let 3	"Babaroga"	55	24	79	3
10	Alen Đuras	"A Tamburitza Lullaby"	35	27	62	5
11	Eugen	"Tišine"	26	15	41	8
12	Vatra	"Slatke suze, gorka ljubav"	21	15	36	9
13	Damir Kedžo	"Voljena ženo"	51	22	73	4
14	Baby Lasagna	"Rim Tim Tagi Dim"	74	247	321	1
15	Marcela	"Gasoline"	39	20	59	6
16	Vinko	"Lying Eyes"	59	23	82	2

Detailed jury votes
R/O	Song	Osijek	Ukraine	Rijeka	Iceland	Split	Italy	Germany	Zagreb	Total
1	"Dijamanti"	3		8		4		1	8	24
2	"Vodu piti trizan biti"									0
3	"More"		1		5		3			9
4	"Can We Talk"	1		2		3	2		2	10
5	"Sretnih dana dat' će Bog"							3		3
6	"Do mjeseca"	7	5	5	6	2		6	7	38
7	"Ne plačem zbog nje"						1			1
8	"Ne vjerujem ti"						8	10	1	19
9	"Babaroga"	10	2	10	10	6	4	7	6	55
10	"A Tamburitza Lullaby"	2	8	6	2	8	6		3	35
11	"Tišine"		6		3		5	12		26
12	"Slatke suze, gorka ljubav"	4	7	1	8	1				21
13	"Voljena ženo"	5	3	7	7	7	10	8	4	51
14	"Rim Tim Tagi Dim"	12	10	12	12	12		4	12	74
15	"Gasoline"	8	4	4	4	5	7	2	5	39
16	"Lying Eyes"	6	12	3	1	10	12	5	10	59

==== Ratings ====
Viewing figures by show
Show	Air date	Viewing figures	
Show	Air date	Nominal	Share
Final	25 February 2024	720,000	24.04%

==== Reception ====
In the lead-up to and following Dora, HRT was criticized by Eurovision fans and the general public for originally excluding the eventual winner Baby Lasagna from the line-up, placing him as a backup entry; when the entries were first released, he became the favourite to win. Writing for Index.hr, Marina Radoš called for the resignation of the HRT Eurovision team following the contest. HRT received further criticism for poor quality of the selected entries and the audio and technical difficulties. Following Baby Lasagna's performance in the first Eurovision semi-final, Index.hr further criticized HRT for placing him as a backup entry, calling out the jury, consisting of Željko Mesar, Igor Geržina, Dražen Miočić, Robert Urlić, Tomislav Krizmanić and Ema Gross, and disputing their competence.

=== Promotion ===
As part of the promotion of his participation in the contest, Baby Lasagna attended the PrePartyES in Madrid on 30 March 2024, the London Eurovision Party on 7 April 2024 and the Eurovision in Concert event in Amsterdam on 13 April 2024 – the latter preceded by an appearance on the Dutch TV show Beau, broadcast on RTL 4. On 22 March 2024, he performed at the Večernjak's Rose award ceremony in Zagreb. On 13 April 2024, HRT organised a national mass dance to "Rim Tim Tagi Dim" across the cities of Zagreb, Split, Osijek, Zadar and Baby Lasagna's hometown of Umag; the footage was then shown on HRT shows Dobro jutro, Hrvatska, Dnevnik, Kod nas doma, and on the HRT social networks and website. On 21 April 2024, Baby Lasagna performed the song on the Slovenian TV show Nedeljsko popoldne, broadcast on TV SLO 1. He then met the Swedish ambassador to Croatia Anna Boda in Zagreb. The singer signed a cooperation agreement with the Municipality of Umag for financial and promotional purposes. On 1 May, Baby Lasagna took part in Serbian representative Teya Dora's birthday party, organised by the Serbian and Croatian delegations and open to press and fans.

== At Eurovision ==
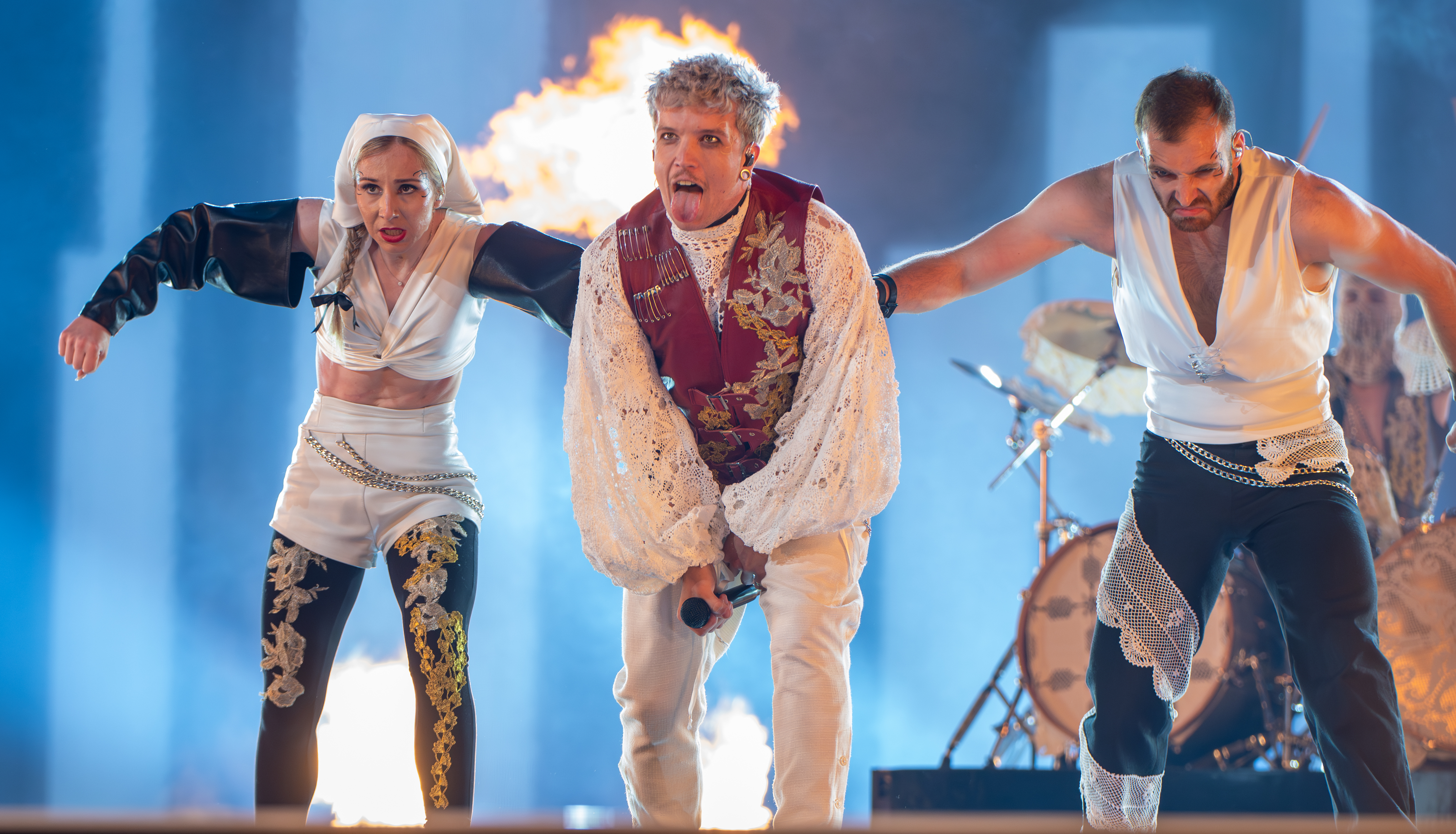
Baby Lasagna during a rehearsal before the first semi-final.

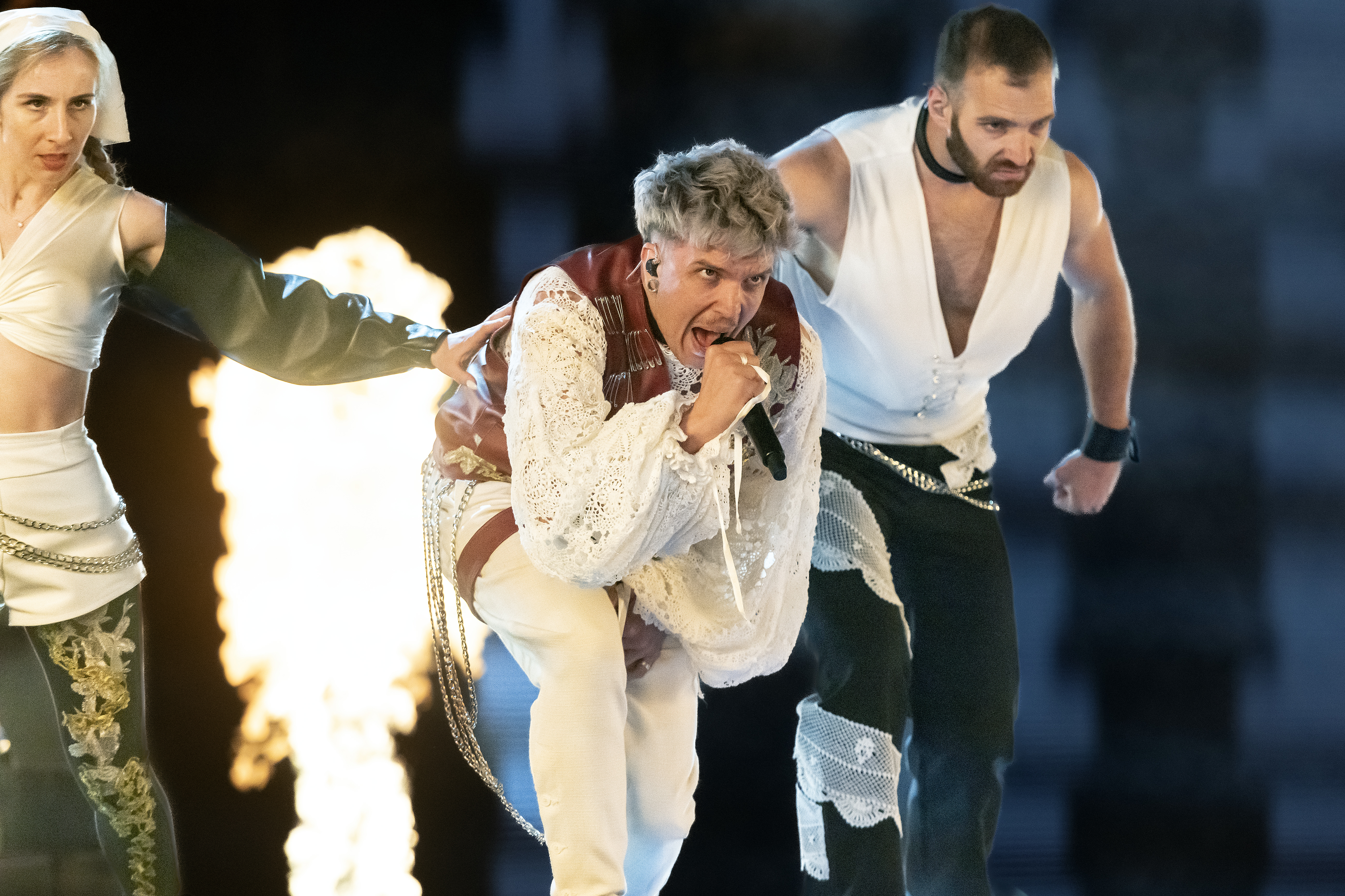
Baby Lasagna during the dress rehearsal for the final on 10 May 2024.

The Eurovision Song Contest 2024 took place at the Malmö Arena in Malmö, Sweden, and consisted of two semi-finals held on the respective dates of 7 and 9 May and the final on 11 May 2024. All nations with the exceptions of the host country and the "Big Five" (France, Germany, Italy, Spain and the United Kingdom) were required to qualify from one of two semi-finals in order to compete in the final; the top ten countries from each semi-final progressed to the final. On 30 January 2024, an allocation draw was held to determine which of the two semi-finals, as well as which half of the show, each country would perform in; the European Broadcasting Union (EBU) split up the competing countries into different pots based on voting patterns from previous contests, with countries with favourable voting histories put into the same pot. Croatia was scheduled for the first half of the first semi-final. The shows' producers then decided the running order for the semi-finals; Croatia was set to perform in position 7.

In Croatia, all three shows were broadcast on HRT 1 as well as on the broadcaster's streaming platform HRTi, with commentary by Duško Ćurlić, and on the HRT radio station HR 2, with commentary by Zlatko Turkalj. On HRT 1, the final was viewed by an average of 1.225 million, equating a viewing share of 74% of the Croatian TV audience for the four-hour broadcast of the final.

=== Performance ===
Baby Lasagna took part in technical rehearsals on 27 April and 1 May, followed by dress rehearsals on 6 and 7 May. For his performance of "Rim Tim Tagi Dim" at the contest, he is joined by supporting dancers. The costumes, taking inspiration from Croatian traditional clothing, were designed by Valentina Pliško.

=== Semi-final ===
Croatia performed in position 7, following the entry from Poland and before the entry from Iceland. At the end of the show, the country was announced as a qualifier for the final. It was later revealed that Croatia placed first out of the fifteen participating countries in the first semi-final with 177 points.

=== Final ===
Following the semi-final, Croatia drew "producer's choice" for the final, meaning that the country will perform in the half decided by the contest's producers. The country was later chosen by producers to perform in position 23, following the entry from Slovenia and before the entry from Georgia. Baby Lasagna once again took part in dress rehearsals on 10 and 11 May before the final, including the jury final where the professional juries cast their final votes before the live show on 11 May. He performed a repeat of his semi-final performance during the final on 11 May. Croatia placed second in the final, scoring 547 points; 337 points from the public televoting and 210 points from the juries. This marked Croatia's best result in the contest to date.

=== Voting ===
Below is a breakdown of points awarded to Croatia in the first semi-final and in the final. Voting during the three shows involved each country awarding sets of points from 1-8, 10 and 12: one from their professional jury and the other from televoting in the final vote, while the semi-final vote was based entirely on the vote of the public. The Croatian jury consisted of Gina Victoria Damjanović, Dino Jelusić, who won the 2003 Junior contest, Srđan Sekulović – Skansi, Mihovil Šoštarić, and Vanna, who represented Croatia in the 2001 contest. In the first semi-final, Croatia placed 1st with 177 points, marking the first time the country had won a Eurovision semi-final. The country received twelve points from Australia, Finland, Iceland, Serbia, Slovenia and Ukraine. This marked a second consecutive qualification to the final. In the final, Croatia placed 2nd with 547 points, receiving twelve points in the jury vote from Cyprus and Serbia and twelve points in the public televote from Albania, Austria, Azerbaijan, Denmark, Iceland, Ireland, Norway, Serbia and Slovenia. This marked the highest position ever achieved by Croatia at the contest. Over the course of the contest, Croatia awarded its 12 points to Serbia in the first semi-final, and to Portugal (jury) and Serbia (televote) in the final.

HRT appointed again Ivan Dorian Molnar as its spokesperson to announce the Croatian jury's votes in the final as in 2021 and 2022.

==== Points awarded to Croatia ====
Points awarded to Croatia (Semi-final 1)
Score	Televote
12 points	Australia; Finland; Germany; Iceland; Serbia; Slovenia; Sweden; Ukraine
10 points	Ireland; Lithuania; Poland
8 points	Moldova; Rest of the World; United Kingdom
7 points	Azerbaijan; Cyprus; Luxembourg
6 points	Portugal
5 points	
4 points	
3 points	
2 points	
1 point	

Points awarded to Croatia (Final)
Score	Televote	Jury
12 points	Albania; Austria; Azerbaijan; Denmark; Iceland; Ireland; Norway; Serbia; Slovenia	Cyprus; Serbia
10 points	Australia; Estonia; Finland; Germany; Lithuania; Luxembourg; Malta; Netherlands; Poland; Sweden; Switzerland; Ukraine	Finland; Iceland; Lithuania; Malta; Sweden
8 points	Belgium; Czechia; Italy; Rest of the World; San Marino; Spain	Australia; Austria; Denmark; Estonia; Italy; Moldova; Poland; Switzerland; United Kingdom
7 points	Armenia; France; Moldova; Portugal; United Kingdom	Ireland; Netherlands
6 points	Greece	Armenia; Germany; Latvia; Luxembourg; Slovenia
5 points	Cyprus; Georgia; Israel; Latvia	
4 points		Azerbaijan; Israel; Ukraine
3 points		Albania
2 points		Czechia; France
1 point		Georgia

==== Points awarded by Croatia ====
Points awarded by Croatia (Semi-final 1)
Score	Televote
12 points	Serbia
10 points	Slovenia
8 points	Ukraine
7 points	Luxembourg
6 points	Ireland
5 points	Finland
4 points	Cyprus
3 points	Lithuania
2 points	Portugal
1 point	Moldova

Points awarded by Croatia (Final)
Score	Televote	Jury
12 points	Serbia	Portugal
10 points	Slovenia	Slovenia
8 points	Ukraine	Ireland
7 points	Italy	Ukraine
6 points	France	Italy
5 points	Ireland	Luxembourg
4 points	Estonia	France
3 points	Armenia	Serbia
2 points	Sweden	Sweden
1 point	Switzerland	Cyprus

==== Detailed voting results ====
Each participating broadcaster assembles a five-member jury panel consisting of music industry professionals who are citizens of the country they represent. Each jury, and individual jury member, is required to meet a strict set of criteria regarding professional background, as well as diversity in gender and age. No member of a national jury was permitted to be related in any way to any of the competing acts in such a way that they cannot vote impartially and independently. The individual rankings of each jury member as well as the nation's televoting results were released shortly after the grand final.

The following members comprised the Croatian jury:

- Gina Victoria Damjanović
- Dino Jelusić
- Srđan Sekulović – Skansi
- Mihovil Šoštarić
- Ivana Vrdoljak (Vanna)

Detailed voting results from Croatia (Semi-final 1)
R/O	Country	Televote	
R/O	Country	Rank	Points
01	Cyprus	7	4
02	Serbia	1	12
03	Lithuania	8	3
04	Ireland	5	6
05	Ukraine	3	8
06	Poland	12	
07	Croatia		
08	Iceland	14	
09	Slovenia	2	10
10	Finland	6	5
11	Moldova	10	1
12	Azerbaijan	13	
13	Australia	11	
14	Portugal	9	2
15	Luxembourg	4	7

Detailed voting results from Croatia (Final)
R/O	Country	Jury							Televote	
R/O	Country	Juror A	Juror B	Juror C	Juror D	Juror E	Rank	Points	Rank	Points
01	Sweden	10	4	5	13	17	9	2	9	2
02	Ukraine	4	1	6	11	3	4	7	3	8
03	Germany	13	16	20	20	14	19		19	
04	Luxembourg	6	10	10	5	5	6	5	18	
~~05~~	~~Netherlands~~ ‡ (Note: The Netherlands was disqualified prior to the final.)	~~22~~	~~19~~	~~21~~	~~10~~	~~6~~	~~14~~		N/A	
06	Israel	15	9	9	12	15	12		15	
07	Lithuania	23	8	22	16	16	17		12	
08	Spain	24	7	23	8	18	13		17	
09	Estonia	20	22	24	18	25	24		7	4
10	Ireland	1	17	3	2	4	3	8	6	5
11	Latvia	14	13	15	24	21	20		21	
12	Greece	12	18	11	15	19	16		11	
13	United Kingdom	25	25	25	17	20	25		24	
14	Norway	17	23	19	22	22	22		20	
15	Italy	7	5	8	6	8	5	6	4	7
16	Serbia	5	11	18	4	7	8	3	1	12
17	Finland	21	24	17	19	23	23		13	
18	Portugal	3	2	2	1	2	1	12	23	
19	Armenia	16	20	16	9	13	15		8	3
20	Cyprus	9	15	4	14	12	10	1	16	
21	Switzerland	8	6	12	21	9	11		10	1
22	Slovenia	2	12	1	3	1	2	10	2	10
23	Croatia									
24	Georgia	19	21	13	25	24	21		22	
25	France	11	3	7	7	10	7	4	5	6
26	Austria	18	14	14	23	11	18		14	

== After Eurovision ==
Following Baby Lasagna's second place finish at the 2024 contest, the Zagreb Assembly announced it would organise a series of events to welcome the singer back to the country. On 12 May 2024, Ban Jelačić Square featured performances to celebrate the result, featuring appearances from Let 3, who represented Croatia in the Eurovision Song Contest 2023, Tajči and Emilija Kokić, as well as DJ Mario Kovač. Baby Lasagna also attended the event with a performance of "Rim Tim Tagi Dim". Attendees included Tomislav Tomašević (Mayor of Zagreb) and Andrej Plenković (Prime Minister of Croatia). The event was also broadcast live on HRT 1.
