= The Splitters =

Croatian band

- Origin: Split, Croatia
- Genres: Rock; pop rock
- Years active: 2017–present
- Label: Croatia Records
- Members: Josip Senta; Marko Komić; Petar Senta; Antonio Komić

The Splitters is a Croatian rock band composed of four members: Josip Senta, Marko Komić, Petar Senta and Antonio Komić.

== History ==
The Splitters were formed in 2017 in Split, Croatia. They started performing their original songs at various festivals such as the ST@rt festival in Split and the West Herzegowina Festival in Široki Brijeg. The band's debut album Love Sucks was released on 7 April 2018. It was only available via SoundCloud and contained English language songs.

In early 2019 the band signed a record deal with Croatia Records and since then they have been writing Croatian language songs. Their second studio album and first to be recorded in Croatian, Izvedi me van, was released on 2 July 2020.

At the 69th edition of the Zagreb Festival in 2022 they performed the song "Izgubljeni grad". The Splitters were one of the 18 participants in Dora 2023, the national contest in Croatia to select the country's Eurovision Song Contest 2023 entry, coming fourth with the song "Lost and Found". The band was among the 24 participants in Dora 2024 with the song "Od kad te sanjam"; they did not qualify for the final.

== Band members ==
All members have been the same since the band formed in 2017.

- Josip Senta – vocals, bass guitar (2017–present)
- Marko Komić – guitar 2017–present)
- Petar Senta – rhythm guitar, vocals (2017–present)
- Antonio Komić – drums (2017–present)

== Discography ==
=== Studio albums ===
Title	Details
Love Sucks	Released: 7 April 2018; Label: Self-released; Formats: streaming
Izvedi me van	To be released: 2 July 2020; Label: Croatia Records; Formats: CD, digital download, streaming

=== Singles ===
Title	Year	Peak chart positions	Album
Title	Year	CRO	Album
"Oboji me"	2019	—	Izvedi me van
"Život na ekranu"	2019	—	Izvedi me van
"Zauvijek mlad"	2019	—	Izvedi me van
"Nepoznata netko"	2020	—	Izvedi me van
"Lollipop"	2020	—	Izvedi me van
"Barbara"	2021	—	Non-album single
"Nitko kao mi"	2021	—	Non-album single
"Emocionalna pornografija"	2022	—	Non-album single
"Izgubljeni gradi"	2022	36	Non-album single
"Role filmova"	2022	—	Non-album single
"Lost And Found"	2023	—	Non-album single
"Svjetlost"	2023	17	Non-album single
"—" denotes releases that did not chart or were not released in that territory.
