= Pavel (band) =

Croatian rock band

- Origin: Zagreb, Croatia
- Genres: Rock; pop rock
- Years active: 2006–present
- Labels: Dallas Records
- Members: Aljoša Šerić; Antonia Matković; Jurica Hotko; Toni Tkalec; Josip Radić; Stipe Mađor; Dean Melki; Filip Hrelja
- Past members: Saša Jungić, Jakov Kolega, Jerko Jurin

Pavel is a Croatian rock band composed of eight members: Aljoša Šerić, Antonia Matković, Jurica Hotko, Toni Tkalec, Mario Radan, Stipe Mađor, Dean Melki and Filip Hrelja. The group signed a joint record deal with Dallas Records, after forming in 2006. Later in 2007, the group released their debut studio album, Pavel.

The band was among the participants of Dora 2024, the Croatian selection for the Eurovision Song Contest 2024, with the song "Do mjeseca"; they advanced from their semi-final on 22 February 2024.

== Band members ==
Current members

- Aljoša Šerić — vocals, acoustic guitar (2006–present)
- Antonia Matković — vocals (2006–present)
- Jurica Hotko — piano (2006–present)
- Toni Tkalec — guitar (2020–present)
- Josip Radić — bass guitar (2021–present)
- Stipe Mađor — trumpet (2006–present)
- Dean Melki — violin (2006–present)
- Filip Hrelja — drums (2020–present)

== Discography ==
=== Albums ===
- Pavel (2007)
- Od prve zvijezde ravno (2012)
- I mi smo došli na red (2014)
- Družba krivih odluka (2017)
- Ennui (2020)

=== Singles ===
Title	Year	Peak chart positions	Album
Title	Year	CRO	Album
"Sunce"	2019	5	Non-album singles
"Samo da jutro ne dočekam sama"	2019	36	Non-album singles
"Ne daj na nas"	2020	3	Non-album singles
"Dobri se zaborave"	2020	23	Non-album singles
"Jedan dobar dan"	2021	12	Non-album singles
