= Boris Štok =

Croatian singer

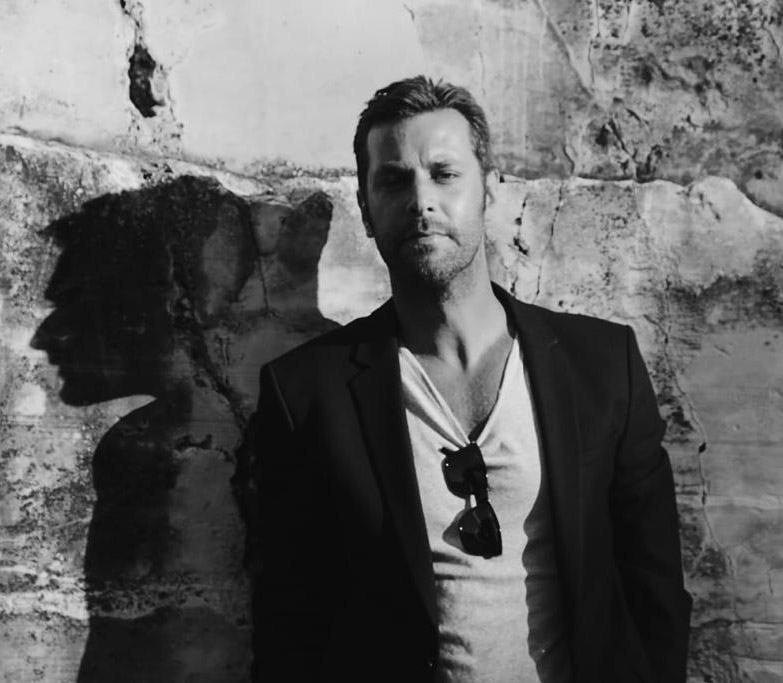

Background information
- Born: 18 March 1978 (age 48); Rijeka, SR Croatia, SFR Yugoslavia
- Genres: Rock
- Occupations: Singer; songwriter
- Years active: 2000–present
- Label: Aquarius Records

Boris Štok (born 18 March 1978) is a Croatian singer and songwriter. He is most known as the lead vocalist for the rock band Quasarr. Štok began to establish himself as a solo artist with the release of the single "Voli me još ovu noć" in 2017. In October 2017, Štok released his debut EP Puls through Aquarius Records. Shortly after, in 2018, his debut album Ispod kože was released. In 2019, the album won him a Porin award in the category Best Alternative Album.

== Life and career ==
Boris Štok was born on 18 March 1978 in Rijeka, Croatia. He graduated in Management at the Faculty of Economics in Rijeka.

He started his music journey by playing music in a series of demo bands, choirs (such as Putokazi) and cover bands with which he performed in Croatia and Slovenia. His musical role models are Shirley Bassey, Roisin Murphy, Frank Sinatra, Brendan Perry, Nina Simone, David Bowie and Randy Crawford.

In 2000, started his career as a co-founder and long-term member of the rock band Quasarr. The band released three albums, the self-titled Quasarr (2007), Propaganda (2011) and Sjene (2015).

In 2017, Štok started his solo career with the singles "Ove misli", "Voli me još ovu noć", "Ispod kože" and "Kao mi". Later, in the same year, he released his debut EP Puls which earned him a Porin award nomination in the category Best New Artist. In October 2018 releases his first studio album Ispod kože, for which won a Porin award in the category "Best Alternative Album". In November 2020, Štok released his second studio album Uvijek dio mene. The album spawned numerous singles, among them "Predajem se tebi", "Reci mi" and "Još uvijek". Štok's third studio album 3 was released in November 2022.

Štok was one of the 18 participants in Dora 2023, the national contest in Croatia to select the country's Eurovision Song Contest 2023 entry, coming fourteenth with the song "Grijeh". Štok was again one of the 24 participants in Dora 2024 with the song "Can We Talk"; he advanced from his semi-final on 23 February 2024.

== Discography ==
=== Albums ===
Title	Details
Ispod kože	Released: 5 October 2018; Label: Aquarius Records; Formats: CD, digital download, streaming
Uvijek dio mene	Released: 20 November 2020; Label: Aquarius Records; Formats: CD, digital download, streaming
3	Released: 22 November 2022; Label: Aquarius Records; Formats: CD, digital download, streaming

=== Extended plays ===
Title	Details
Puls	Released: 18 October 2017; Label: Aquarius Records; Formats: CD, digital download, streaming

== Awards and nominations ==
Year	Association	Category	Nominee / work	Result	Ref.
2018	Porin	Best New Artist	Boris Štok	Nominated	
2019	Porin	Best Alternative Album	Ispod kože	Won	
2021	Porin	Best Alternative Album	Uvijek dio mene	Nominated	
