= Two Dogs Fuckin' =

Studio album by Let 3
- Released: April 5, 1989
- Recorded: June to December 1988
- Studio: Studio Tivoli, Ljubljana; Križanke Ljubljana
- Genre: Rock, Alternative rock
- Length: 37:58
- Label: Helidon
- Producer: Goran Lisica

Let 3 chronology
Two Dogs Fuckin' (1989)	El Desperado (1991)

Singles from Two Dogs Fuckin'
- 1. "Izgubljeni" Released: 1989

Two Dogs Fuckin' is the first album by rock band Let 3. The album was released in 1989 by Helidon.

The album was digitally remastered in 2009 by Dallas Records following the 20 year anniversary of the album.

== Reception ==
Professional ratings
Review scores
Source	Rating
Muzika.hr	4/5 stars
Terapija.hr	10/10 stars
tportal.hr	9/10 stars

The album was well received by Croatian critics and fans. The song "Izgubljeni" was a big hit among fans and has since become a song that the football supporters of HNK Rijeka Armada uses at matches.

== Track listing ==
No.	Title	Producer(s)	Length
1.	"Sam U Vodi" (Guitar – Igor Leonardi, Synthesizer – Raoul Varljen)	Goran Lisica	5:51
2.	"Ne Trebam Te" (Saxophone – Mario Marolt)	Goran Lisica	3:45
3.	"U Rupi Od Smole" (Guitar – Igor Leonardi)	Goran Lisica	5:25
4.	"Armada" (Acoustic Guitar – Igor Karlić, Guitar – Dalibor Laginja, Synthesizer – Raoul Varljen, Timpani – Siniša Banović)	Goran Lisica	3:43
5.	"Ciklama"	Goran Lisica	0:28
6.	"Izgubljeni" (Woodwind [Sopile] – Dubravko Seršić)	Goran Lisica	3:33
7.	"Zora" (Backing Vocals – Tanja Cacadou, Guitar – Igor Leonardi)	Goran Lisica	4:55
8.	"Niotkuda"	Goran Lisica	4:55
9.	"Veliki Dan" (Backing Vocals – Nina Cacadou, Sitar, Flute [Fife] – Martin Lumbar, Synthesizer – Raoul Varljen)	Goran Lisica	5:20
Total length:			37:58

Remastered bonus tracks
No.	Title	Length
10.	"Pere, Pere"	4:46
11.	"Ne Trebam Te (Live)"	3:46
12.	"We Are Lost"	3:22
Total length:		39:52

== Personnel ==
- Damir Martinović – Mrle (bass, vocal)
- Zoran Prodanović – Prlja (vocal)
- Ivica Dražić – Miki (guitar, voice)
- Nenad Tubin – Tubin (drums, voice)
- Igor Perović – Gigi (guitar)
