= Gustafi =

Croatian folk rock band

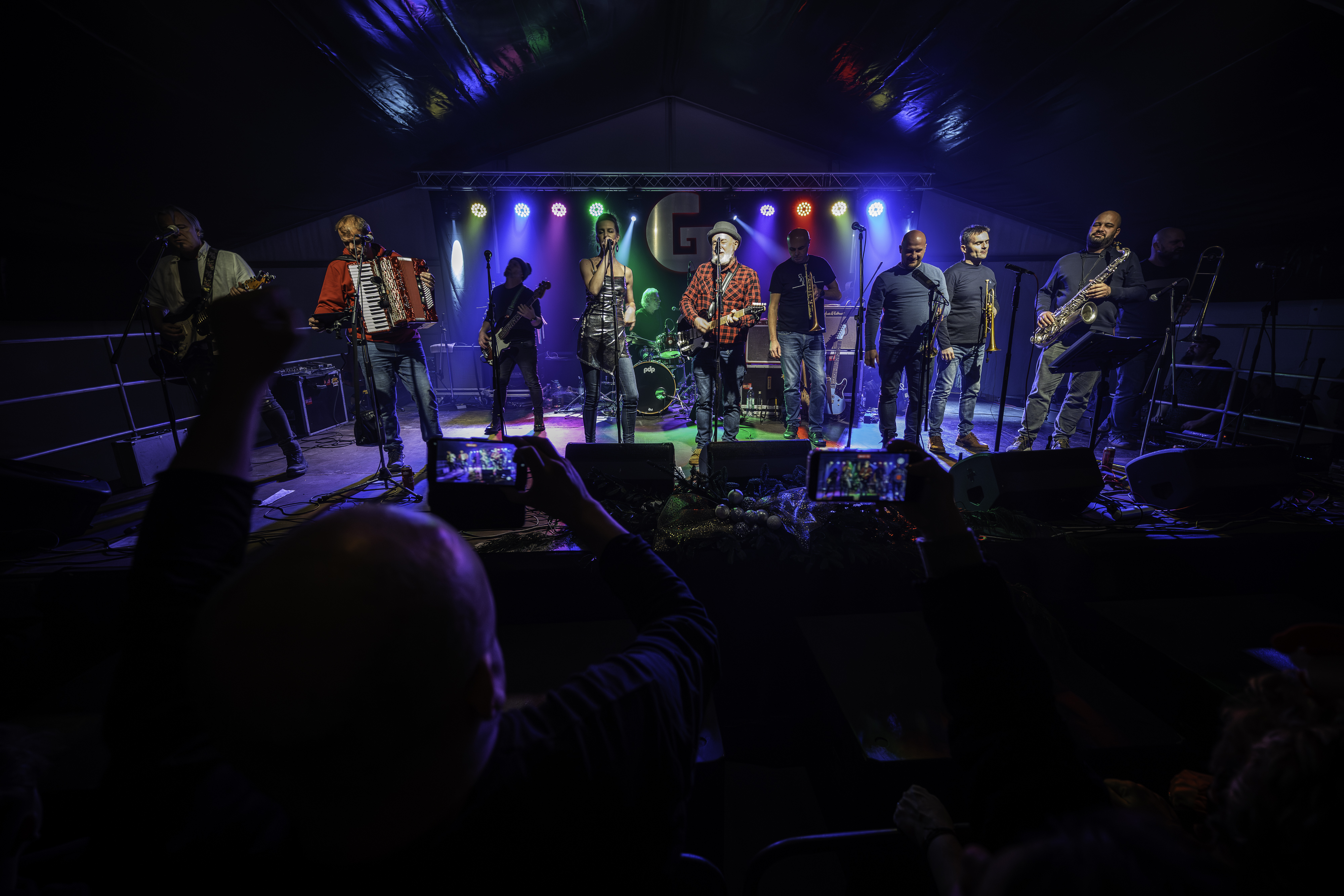

Background information
- Origin: Vodnjan, Croatia
- Genres: World rock music
- Years active: 1980–present
- Label: Artistra Records/ Spona
- Members: Edi Maružin; Čedomir Mošnja; Alen Peruško; Boris Mohorić; Aldo Foško; Ang Maružin; Luka Horvat; Bernarda Ravnić; Marko Šišović; Jimi Grgić; Mirjan Derossi
- Past members: Vlado Maružin; Rusmin Obić; Edin Pecman; Davor Milovan; Romano Hantih; Martin Šikman; Gianluca Antonini; Sara Queiroz; Ana Antolović; Ana Ljutić; Emmanoele da Silva; Barbara Munjas; Alen Berobić; Dino Kalčić; Davor Kliman; Tatjana Giorgi; Nikola Bernobić; Anton Železnik; Mihaela Sirotnjak; Domenik Tuna; Davor Dragosavac; Fredi Poropat; Antun Fero

Gustafi are a Croatian folk rock band formed in Vodnjan, a small town in Istria, in 1980. The band was founded by Edi Maružin, Vlado Maružin, Čedomir Mošnja, Igor Arih and Livio Morosin and was originally called Gustaph y njegovi dobri duhovi. They released their first album titled V in 1985.

The band is known for their eclectic style which combines Istrian folk music and rock, along with blues and Tex-Mex influences. They are considered one of the most prominent examples of the so-called ča-val (Cha Wave), a type of pop rock music accompanied with lyrics sung in the chakavian dialect spoken in Istria, which became popular in the mid-1990s in Croatia (other notable performers of ča-val are Alen Vitasović and Šajeta).

== Discography ==
- V (1985)
- Tutofato (1994)
- Zarad tebe (1995)
- Sentimiento muto (1997)
- Vraćamo se odmah (1999)
- Na minimumu (2002)
- Gust of (2004)
- Tampon, vol. 1 (2005)
- F.F. (2006)
- Chupacabra (2009)
- Kanibalkanska (2012)
- Maneštra (2015)
