= Desperado =

Desperado or desperados may refer to:

- Outlaw, particularly in the American Old West

== Books ==
- Desperadoes (comics), a comic book series
- Desperadoes (novel), a 1979 novel by Ron Hansen
- Desperado Publishing, an American independent comic book publisher

== Film and television ==
- Desperado (film series), a series of five TV movies from 1987 to 1989
- Desperado (film), a 1995 action thriller with Antonio Banderas
- Desperados (film), a 2020 American comedy film
- The Desperadoes, a 1943 Western starring Randolph Scott and Claire Trevor
- The Desperados, a 1969 Western starring Vince Edwards and Jack Palance
- Desperados (TV series), a UK children's drama show
- The Dirty Outlaws, a 1967 western also known as El Desperado or The Desperado

== Games ==
- Desperado (chess), a chess piece that seems determined to give itself up
- Desperados (video game series), a stealth-based real-time tactics game series
  - Desperados: Wanted Dead or Alive, the first game in the series released in 2001
- Gun.Smoke, a 1985 video game, ported to some systems as Desperado - Gun.Smoke
- Desperados, a 1999 video game by ValuSoft

== Amusement rides ==
- Desperado (roller coaster), a roller coaster at Buffalo Bill's casino in Primm, Nevada
- Desperados (ride), a collective amusement ride

== Music ==
=== Bands ===
- Desperado (band), an American heavy metal band
- Desperadoes Steel Orchestra, a Trinidad steelband
- Dezperadoz (formerly Desperados), a German Western-themed heavy metal band

=== Albums ===
- Desperado: The Soundtrack, a soundtrack album from the 1995 film
- Desperado (Eagles album), Second studio album by the Eagles, 1973
- Desperado (Pat Martino album), 1970, or the title song
- Desperado (High Rise album), 1998, or the title song

=== Songs ===
- "Desperado" (Eagles song), a song by the Eagles
- "Desperado" (Rihanna song), a song by Rihanna 2016
- "Desperado", a song by Alice Cooper from Killer
- "Desperado", a song by Eve of Destiny
- "Desperado", a song by Azealia Banks from Broke with Expensive Taste
- "Desperado", a song by Kenny Rogers from Daytime Friends
- "Desperados", a song by Hanoi Rocks
- "Desperado", a song by Raghav featuring Tesher
- "Desperados", a song by Andy Mineo

== Sports ==
- El Desperado (wrestler), a Japanese professional wrestler
- Dallas Desperados, a franchise in the Arena Football League
- The Desperados, a professional wrestling stable consisting of Dutch Mantel, Black Bart and Deadeye Dick (Randy Colley)

== Other ==
- Desperados (beer), a lager produced by Karlovačko Brewery
