= Let 3 =

Croatian modern rock band

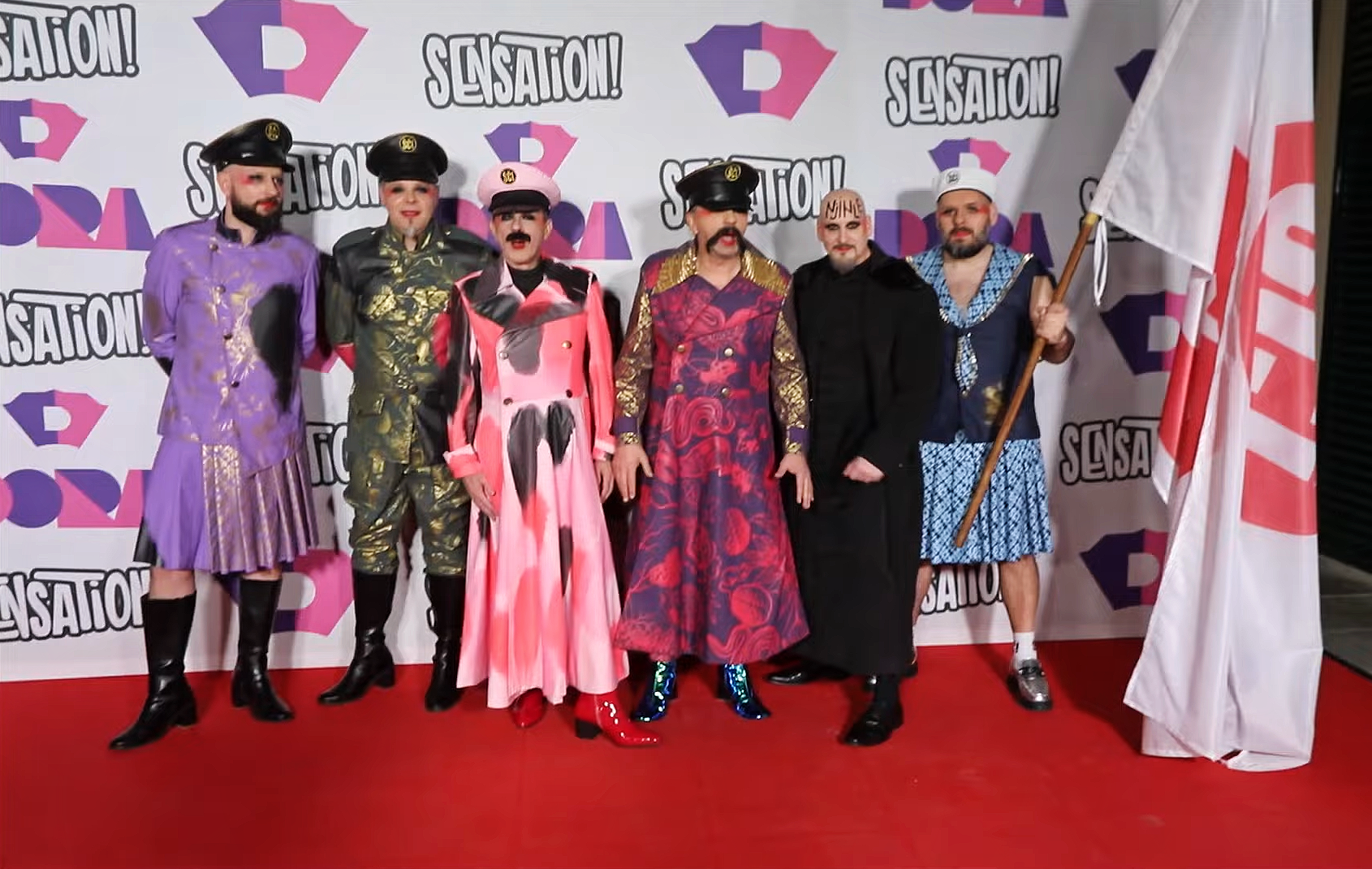
- Let 3 in 2023

Background information
- Origin: Rijeka, Croatia
- Genres: Alternative rock; punk rock; shock rock
- Years active: 1987–present
- Labels: Helidon; Dallas Records
- Members: Damir Martinović; Zoran Prodanović; Ivan Bojčić; Dražen Baljak; Matej Zec

Let 3 (Croatian pronunciation: [lêːt trîː]; transl. 'Flight 3') is a Croatian rock band based in Rijeka, Croatia formed in 1987. The frontmen are Damir Martinović "Mrle" (born 15 July 1961) and Zoran Prodanović "Prlja" (born 18 December 1964). Particularly popular in the SFR Yugoslavia, the band is known for their original approach to rock music and their obscene live performances. Their songs often contain provocative and vulgar lyrics. They represented Croatia in the Eurovision Song Contest 2023 with the song "Mama ŠČ!".

== History ==
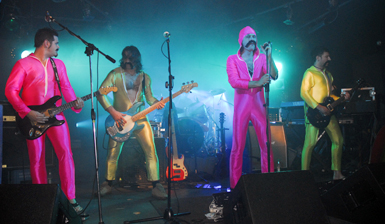
Let 3 in 2007

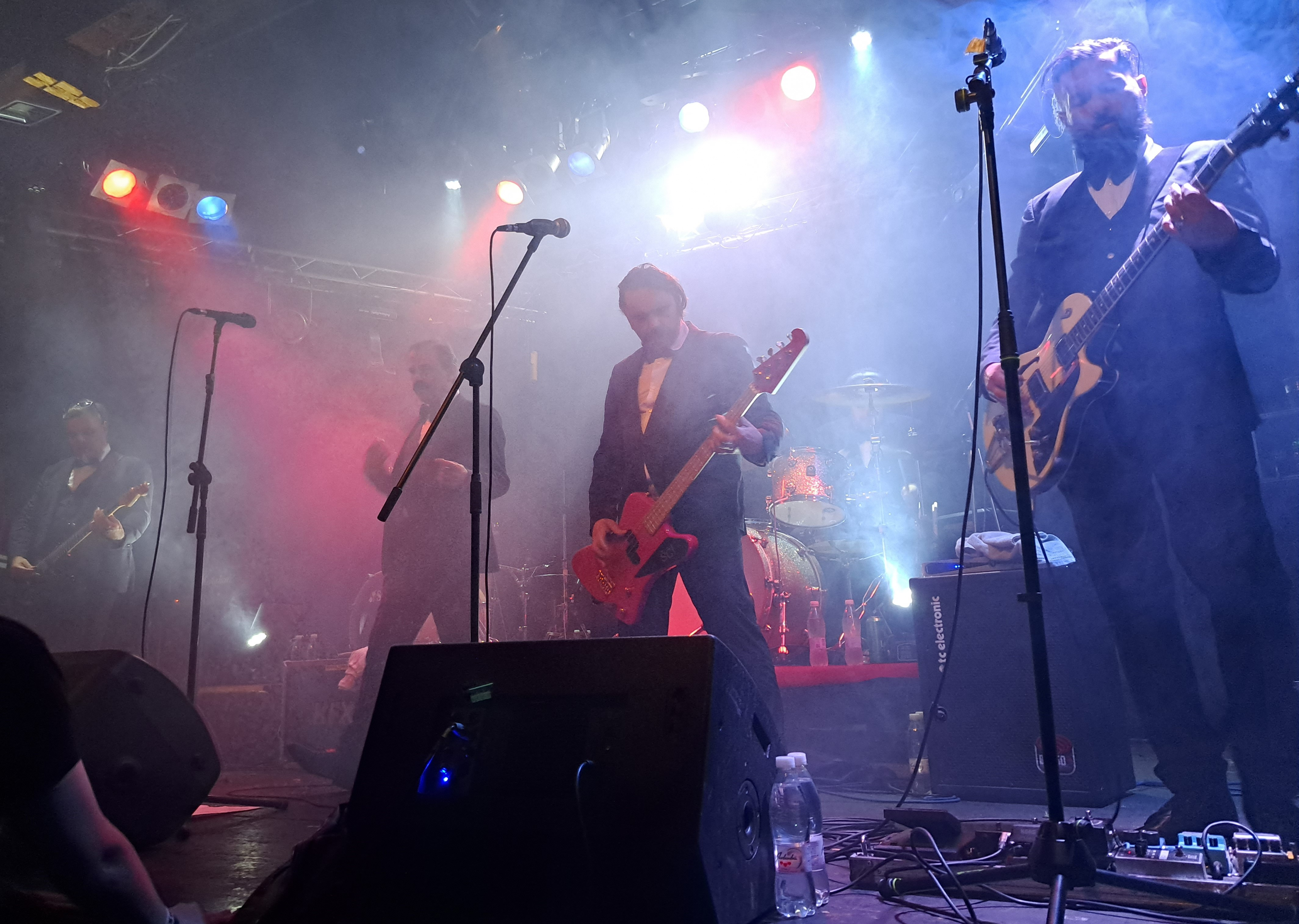
Let 3 performing in 2023

Let 3 was formed in Rijeka in the late 1980s. The band soon gained a reputation for their unprecedented, controversial and sometimes obscene performances, exemplifying the eclectic nature of Rijeka's music scene. The band's members have voiced support for liberal causes, such as women's and LGBT rights, and have taken a vocal stance against conservative politics and the Catholic Church.

In 1997, the band released their fifth album, titled Nečuveno (translated as 'Outrageous' or 'Unheard-of'). It was distributed as a CD, but it had nothing recorded on it. Nonetheless, 350 copies of the album were sold. Just one copy of their follow-up, Jedina (transl. 'The only one'), was initially made; the band refused to sell or distribute it. The record company eventually released the album in slightly different versions. As a protest, the band staged a mock suicide by firing squad on Ban Jelačić Square in Zagreb.

In late 2000, the band unveiled a four-metre tall statue named Babin kurac (transl. 'Grandma's dick'), depicting a woman with a horseshoe moustache and a one-metre long phallus. It was exhibited in various cities throughout Croatia.

In 2005, Let 3 released the single "Rado ide Srbin u vojnike (Pička)" (transl. 'The Serb gladly enlists in the army (Pussy)'), a play on the Serbian patriotic song "Rado ide Srbin u vojnike". In the song's music video, extras dressed in Serbian and Albanian national costumes are seen masturbating. The single featured on the studio album Bombardiranje Srbije i Čačka, which parodies Balkan machismo and militarism. The band stated: "We wanted to create an album of what people here fear the most; namely peasantry… and pornography".

In December 2006, the band was sanctioned by police after performing naked at an open-air concert in Varaždin. The band's defence that they had not been naked because they had corks in their anuses did not convince the judge; the court found them guilty and fined each member kn 350 (€47.78). On 14 December 2008, the live afternoon talk show Nedjeljom u dva was cut short by the host after two of the band members simulated the ejection of a cork from their rectums.

On 9 December 2022, Let 3 was announced as one of eighteen participants in Dora 2023, the Croatian national selection for the Eurovision Song Contest 2023, with the song "Mama ŠČ!". For their performance, they were joined by artist Žanil Tataj Žak as the character "Njinle" (meaning 'Lenin' in Šatrovački). They went on to win the competition by a landslide with a total of 279 points, thus gaining the right to represent Croatia in the Eurovision Song Contest 2023 in Liverpool, United Kingdom. They performed at the first semi-final on 9 May 2023, placing eighth and thus qualifying for the final, where they ultimately came 13th with a score of 123 points (7th in the televote).

For the "Mama ŠČ" video, visuals and staging, as well as numerous live shows and performances, Let 3 collaborated with the drag artist Jovanka Broz Titutka, famous in the Croatian queer scene.

Let 3 was again among the twenty-four participants of Dora 2024 with the song "Babaroga"; they advanced from their semi-final on 22 February 2024. In addition, they performed an interval act of their Croatian Eurovision Mama ŠČ! entry during voting.

== Band members ==
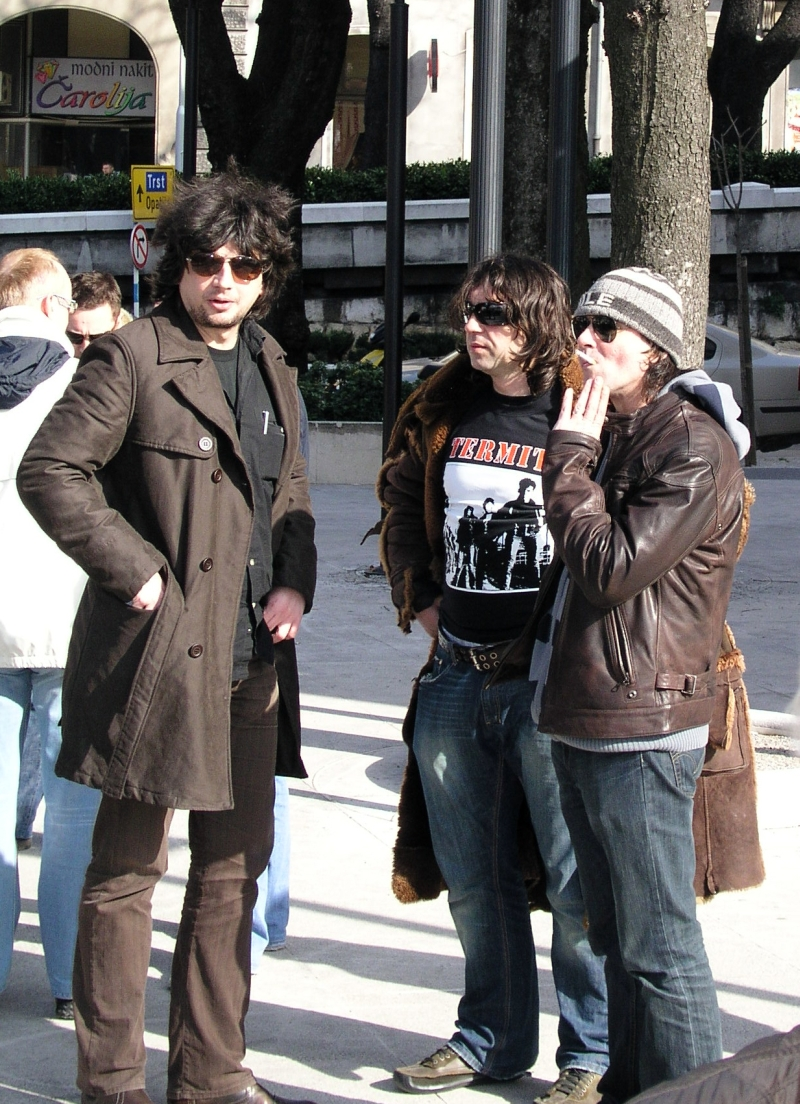
Mrle (centre) and Prlja (right) in Rijeka in 2008

=== Members ===
As of 2024

- Damir Martinović (Mrle) – bass guitar, effects, vocals
- Zoran Prodanović (Prlja) – vocals
- Ivan Bojčić (Bin) – drums
- Dražen Baljak (Baljak) – guitar, mandolin
- Matej Zec (Knki) – guitar, backing tracks

=== Former members ===
- Branko Kovačić (Husta) – drums, percussion
- Kornelije Đuras (Korni) – keyboards, samples
- Ivan Šarar (Faf) – keyboards, programming, samples
- Ivica Dražić (Miki) – guitar, vocals
- Nenad Tubin – drums, vocals
- Igor Perović (Gigi) – guitar
- Zoran Klasić (Klas) – guitar, vocals
- Orijen Modrušan – guitar
- Alen Tibljaš – drums
- Marko Bradaschia – drums
- Dean Benzia – drums
- Siniša Banović – drums
- Ljubomir Silić – bass guitar
- Raoul Varljen – keyboards

== Discography ==
=== Studio albums ===
- 1989 – Two Dogs Fuckin'
- 1991 – El Desperado
- 1994 – Peace
- 1996 – Živi kurac (transl. 'Live dick')
- 1997 – Nečuveno (transl. 'Unheard-of')
- 2000 – Jedina (transl. 'The only one')
- 2005 – Bombardiranje Srbije i Čačka (transl. 'Bombing of Serbia and Čačak')
- 2008 – Živa pička (transl. 'Live cunt')
- 2013 – Kurcem do vjere / Thank You, Lord (transl. 'By dick to faith')
- 2016 – Angela Merkel sere (transl. 'Angela Merkel shits')
- 2023 – ŠČ!
- 2025 – RKTRD NDRD

=== Charted singles ===
List of charted singles, with selected chart positions
Title	Year	Peak chart positions
Title	Year	LTU
"Mama ŠČ!"	2023	24

== Awards and nominations ==
Year	Association	Category	Nominee / work	Result	Ref.
1997	Porin Award	Best Original Vocal or Instrumental Composition for Theatre, Movies and/or Television	"Pipi"	Won	
2001	Porin Award	Best Alternative Album	Jedina	Won	
2001	Crni Mačak	Best Performer	Let 3	Won	
2001	Crni Mačak	Song of the Year	"Profesor Jakov"	Won	
2006	Zlatna Koogla	Album of The Year	Bombardiranje Srbije i Čačka	Won	
2006	Zlatna Koogla	Band of The Year	Let 3	Won	
2006	Zlatna Koogla	Performer of The Year	Let 3	Won	
2006	Zlatna Koogla	Best Music Video	"Rado ide Srbin u vojnike (Pička)"	Won	
2006	Zlatna Koogla	Producer of The Year	Iztok Turk for Bombardiranje Srbije i Čačka	Won	
2006	Zlatna Koogla	Best Album Design	Bombardiranje Srbije i Čačka	Won	
2006	Porin Award	Rock Album of The Year	Bombardiranje Srbije i Čačka	Won	
2006	Porin Award	Best Music Video	"Ero s onoga svijeta"	Won	
2023	Dora		Mama ŠČ!	1st place	
2023	Eurovision Song Contest		Mama ŠČ!	13th place	
2023	You're A Vision Award		Their outfits at Eurovision	2nd place	

Achievements
Preceded by Mia Dimšić with "Guilty Pleasure"	Croatia in the Eurovision Song Contest; 2023	Succeeded by Baby Lasagna with "Rim Tim Tagi Dim"
