= Ika, Croatia =

Coordinates: 45°18′N 14°17′E

Ika
- Town
- Interactive map of Ika
- Country: Croatia
- Region: Istria
- County: Primorje-Gorski Kotar County

Area
  - Total: 0.2 km^{2} (0.077 sq mi)

Population (2021)
  - Total: 295
  - Density: 1,500/km^{2} (3,800/sq mi)
- Time zone: UTC+1 (CET)
  - Summer (DST): UTC+2 (CEST)

Ika is a small village in Croatia. It is a suburb of Opatija settled in Kvarner bay area under the Učka Mountain. It is connected by the D66 state road with Rijeka and Pula.

As a part of Opatija it has been developed from fisherman‘s village to tourist destination with access to Lungomare beaches and proximity of Nature park Učka. In Ika there are 2 beaches separated by an old pier. In this small place you can find restaurants and hotels located at the beachfront.
