= Croatia in the Eurovision Song Contest 2023 =

- Eurovision Song Contest 2023
- Country: Croatia
- Selection process: Dora 2023
- Selection date: 11 February 2023

Competing entry
- Song: "Mama ŠČ!"
- Artist: Let 3
- Songwriters: Damir Martinović Mrle; Zoran Prodanović

Placement
- Semi-final result: Qualified (8th, 76 points)
- Final result: 13th, 123 points

Participation chronology

Croatia was represented at the Eurovision Song Contest 2023 with the song "Mama ŠČ!" performed by Let 3. The Croatian broadcaster Croatian Radiotelevision (HRT) organised the national final Dora 2023 to select the Croatian entry for the 2023 contest. The final took place on 11 February 2023, with a combination of jury voting and televoting selecting Let 3 to represent Croatia at the 2023 contest in Liverpool.

Croatia was drawn to compete in the first semi-final of the Eurovision Song Contest which took place on 9 May 2023 and was later selected to perform in position 7. At the end of the show, "Mama ŠČ!" was announced among the top 10 entries of the first semi-final and hence qualified to compete in the final. It was later revealed that Croatia placed eighth out of the fifteen participating countries in the semi-final with 76 points. In the final, Croatia performed in position 25 and placed thirteenth out of the 26 participating countries, scoring a total of 123 points, marking Croatia's best result since 2017.

== Background ==
Prior to the 2023 contest, Croatia had participated in the Eurovision Song Contest twenty-eight times since its first entry in 1993. The nation's best result in the contest was fourth, which it achieved on two occasions: in 1996 with the song "Sveta ljubav" performed by Maja Blagdan and in 1999 with the song "Marija Magdalena" performed by Doris Dragović. Following the introduction of semi-finals in 2004, Croatia had thus far featured in seven finals. Since 2018, the Croatian entries failed to qualify from the semi-finals; the last time Croatia competed in the final was in 2017 with the song "My Friend" performed by Jacques Houdek. In 2022, Croatia failed to qualify to the final with Mia Dimšić and the song "Guilty Pleasure".

The Croatian national broadcaster, Croatian Radiotelevision (HRT), broadcasts the event within Croatia and organises the selection process for the nation's entry. HRT confirmed Croatia's participation in the 2023 Eurovision Song Contest on 20 September 2022. Between 1993 and 2011, HRT organised the national final Dora in order to select the Croatian entry for the Eurovision Song Contest. In 2012 and 2013, the broadcaster opted to internally select the entry. After missing the contest in 2014 and 2015, the Croatian broadcaster continued the internal selection procedure between 2016 and 2018. Since 2019, HRT has used Dora to select Croatia's entry, a method that was continued for their 2023 participation.

== Before Eurovision ==
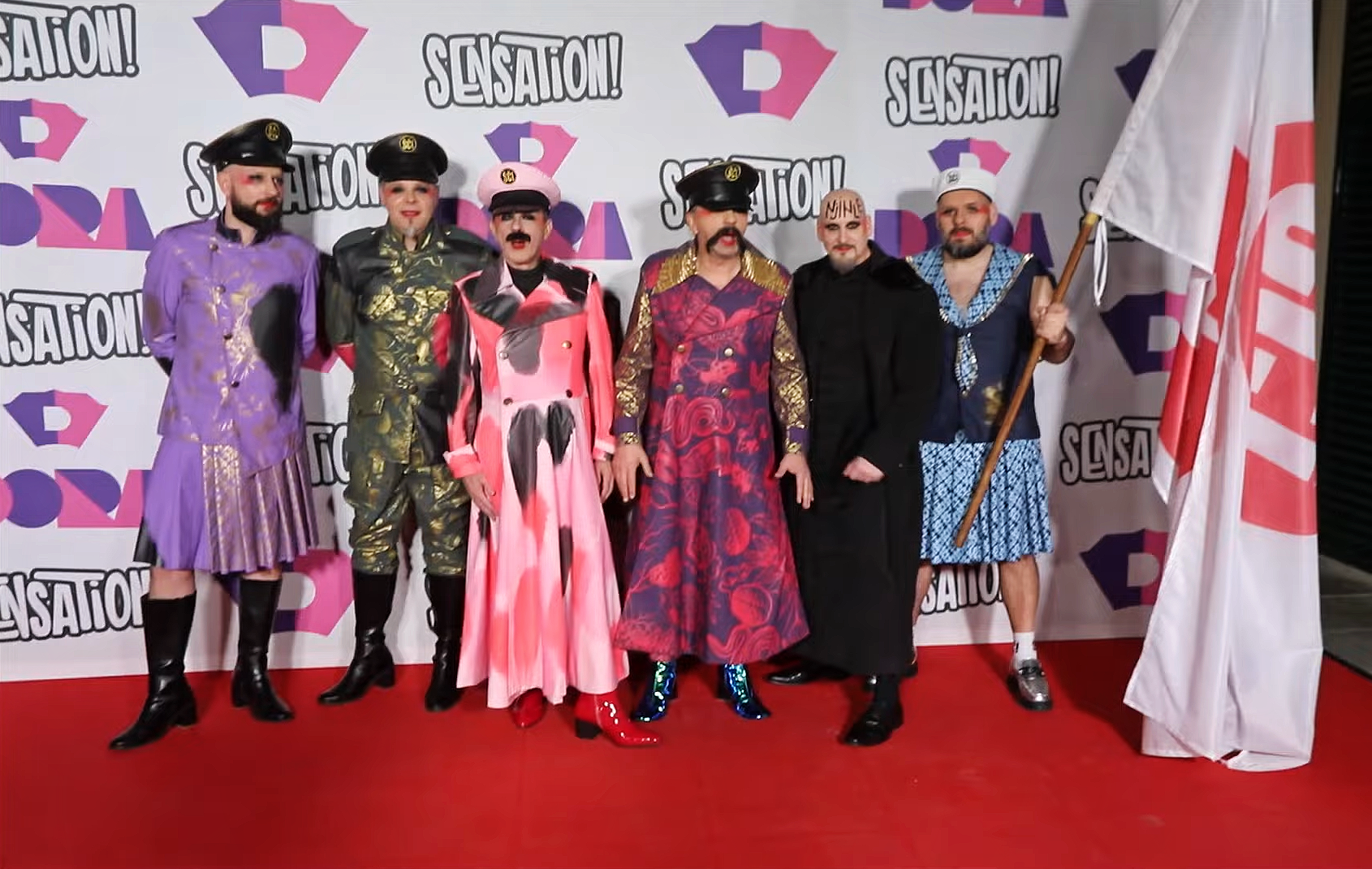
Let 3, winner of Dora 2023

=== Dora 2023 ===
Dora 2023 was the twenty-fourth edition of the Croatian national selection Dora which selects Croatia's entry for the Eurovision Song Contest 2023. The competition consisted of eighteen entries competing in one final on 11 February 2023 at the Marino Cvetković Sports Hall in Opatija, hosted by Mirko Fodor, Mario Lipovšek Battifiaca and Marko Tolja. The show was broadcast on HRT 1 as well as online via the streaming service HRTi.

==== Competing entries ====
On 20 September 2022, HRT opened a submission period where artists and composers were able to submit their entries to the broadcaster with the deadline on 20 November 2022. 196 entries were received by the broadcaster during the submission period. A nine-member expert committee consisting of Željko Mesar (HRT), Zlatko Turkalj (HR), Robert Urlić (HR), Ema Gross (HR), Igor Geržina (HRT), Željen Klašterka (HRT), Ivan Horvat (eurosong.hr), Tomislav Krizmanić (OGAE) and Dražen Miočić (HRT) reviewed the received submissions and selected eighteen artists and songs for the competition. HRT announced the competing entries on 9 December 2022 and among the competing artists was Damir Kedžo, who was set to represent Croatia in the Eurovision Song Contest 2020 before its cancellation.

| Artist | Song | Songwriter(s) |
|---|---|---|
| Barbara Munjas | "Putem snova" | Barbara Munjas, Alen Bernobić |
| Boris Štok | "Grijeh" | Boris Štok, Darko Terlević |
| Damir Kedžo | "Angels and Demons" | Jamie Duffin, Stefan Celar, Kyler Niko, Victoria Jane Horn |
| Đana | "Free Fallin'" | Đana Smajo |
| Detour | "Master Blaster" | Nenad Borgudan |
| Eni Jurišić | "Kreni dalje" | Matija Cvek, Vlaho Arbulić, Eni Jurišić |
| Hana Mašić | "Nesreća" | Boris Subotić |
| Harmonija Disonance | "Nevera (Lei, lei)" | Bartol Stopić, Sanja Daić, Bojan Petrović |
| Krešo and Kisele Kiše | "Kme kme" | Krešimir Burić |
| Let 3 | "Mama ŠČ!" | Damir Martinović Mrle, Zoran Prodanović |
| Maja Grgić | "I Still Live" | Mateo Martinović Teo, Maja Grgić |
| Martha May | "Distance" | Marta Ivić |
| Meri Andraković | "Bye Bye Blonde" | Boris Đurđević, Valerija Đurđević |
| Patricia Gasparini | "I Will Wait" | Siniša Reljić, Lisa Desmond, Aidan Winkels |
| Tajana Belina | "Dom" | Tajana Belina, Marcel Sprunkel |
| The Splitters | "Lost and Found" | Neven Kolarić, Branimir Mihaljević |
| Top of the Pops ft. Mario 5reković | "Putovanje" | Bruno Krajcar, Danijel Načinović |
| Yogi | "Love at First Sight" | Yugomir Lonich |

==== Final ====
The final took place on 11 February 2023. The winner, "Mama ŠČ!" performed by Let 3, was determined by a 50/50 combination of votes from ten regional juries and a public televote. The viewers and the juries each had a total of 580 points to award. Each jury group distributed their points as follows: 1-8, 10 and 12 points. The viewer vote was based on the percentage of votes each song achieved through telephone and SMS voting. For example, if a song gained 10% of the viewer vote, then that entry would be awarded 10% of 580 points rounded to the nearest integer: 58 points. Ties were decided in favour of the entry ranked higher by the public televote. In addition to the performances of the competing entries, the show was opened by 2022 Croatian Eurovision entrant Mia Dimšić, while 1994 Croatian Eurovision entrant Tony Cetinski performed as the interval act.

Final – 11 February 2023
| R/O | Artist | Song | Jury | Televote | Total | Place |
|---|---|---|---|---|---|---|
| 1 | Top of the Pops ft. Mario 5reković | "Putovanje" | 13 | 20 | 33 | 10 |
| 2 | Yogi | "Love at First Sight" | 10 | 3 | 13 | 16 |
| 3 | Boris Štok | "Grijeh" | 7 | 10 | 17 | 14 |
| 4 | Tajana Belina | "Dom" | 2 | 8 | 10 | 17 |
| 5 | Krešo and Kisele Kiše | "Kme kme" | 34 | 19 | 53 | 7 |
| 6 | Maja Grgić | "I Still Live" | 8 | 5 | 13 | 15 |
| 7 | Barbara Munjas | "Putem snova" | 37 | 15 | 52 | 8 |
| 8 | Đana | "Free Fallin'" | 7 | 14 | 21 | 13 |
| 9 | Patricia Gasparini | "I Will Wait" | 5 | 3 | 8 | 18 |
| 10 | The Splitters | "Lost and Found" | 50 | 60 | 110 | 4 |
| 11 | Hana Mašić | "Nesreća" | 21 | 12 | 33 | 11 |
| 12 | Damir Kedžo | "Angels and Demons" | 44 | 59 | 103 | 5 |
| 13 | Martha May | "Distance" | 23 | 8 | 31 | 12 |
| 14 | Detour | "Master Blaster" | 73 | 41 | 114 | 3 |
| 15 | Meri Andraković | "Bye Bye Blonde" | 22 | 22 | 44 | 9 |
| 16 | Let 3 | "Mama ŠČ!" | 105 | 174 | 279 | 1 |
| 17 | Eni Jurišić | "Kreni dalje" | 52 | 19 | 71 | 6 |
| 18 | Harmonija Disonance | "Nevera (Lei, lei)" | 67 | 88 | 155 | 2 |

Detailed Regional Jury Votes
| R/O | Song | Rijeka | Čakovec-Varaždin | Split | Osijek | Šibenik-Knin | Vukovar | Pula | Zadar | Zagreb | Dubrovnik | Total |
|---|---|---|---|---|---|---|---|---|---|---|---|---|
| 1 | "Putovanje" | | | 1 | | | 2 | | | | 10 | 13 |
| 2 | "Love at First Sight" | 2 | | | | | 3 | | | 5 | | 10 |
| 3 | "Grijeh" | | 1 | 3 | | | | 3 | | | | 7 |
| 4 | "Dom" | | | | | 1 | | | | | 1 | 2 |
| 5 | "Kme kme" | 1 | 6 | 4 | | 4 | 5 | 2 | 5 | 3 | 4 | 34 |
| 6 | "I Still Live" | | | | | | | | | | 8 | 8 |
| 7 | "Putem snova" | 7 | 4 | | 1 | 7 | | 8 | | 8 | 2 | 37 |
| 8 | "Free Fallin'" | | 7 | | | | | | | | | 7 |
| 9 | "I Will Wait" | | 3 | | 2 | | | | | | | 5 |
| 10 | "Lost and Found" | 12 | | 12 | | | 1 | 12 | 7 | | 6 | 50 |
| 11 | "Nesreća" | | | 7 | 4 | | | 6 | 2 | 2 | | 21 |
| 12 | "Angels and Demons" | 3 | 10 | 6 | 7 | 3 | 4 | | 4 | 7 | | 44 |
| 13 | "Distance" | 4 | | | 3 | 6 | | 7 | 3 | | | 23 |
| 14 | "Master Blaster" | 6 | 2 | 8 | 8 | 10 | 6 | 5 | 10 | 6 | 12 | 73 |
| 15 | "Bye Bye Blonde" | | | | 6 | 2 | 12 | | 1 | 1 | | 22 |
| 16 | "Mama ŠČ!" | 10 | 12 | 10 | 12 | 12 | 10 | 10 | 12 | 12 | 5 | 105 |
| 17 | "Kreni dalje" | 5 | 5 | 2 | 5 | 5 | 7 | 4 | 6 | 10 | 3 | 52 |
| 18 | "Nevera (Lei, lei)" | 8 | 8 | 5 | 10 | 8 | 8 | 1 | 8 | 4 | 7 | 67 |

==== Ratings ====
Viewing figures by show
| Show | Air date | Viewing figures | | Ref. |
| Show | Air date | Nominal | Share | Ref. |
|---|---|---|---|---|
| Final | 11 February 2023 | 900,000 | 42% | |

== At Eurovision ==
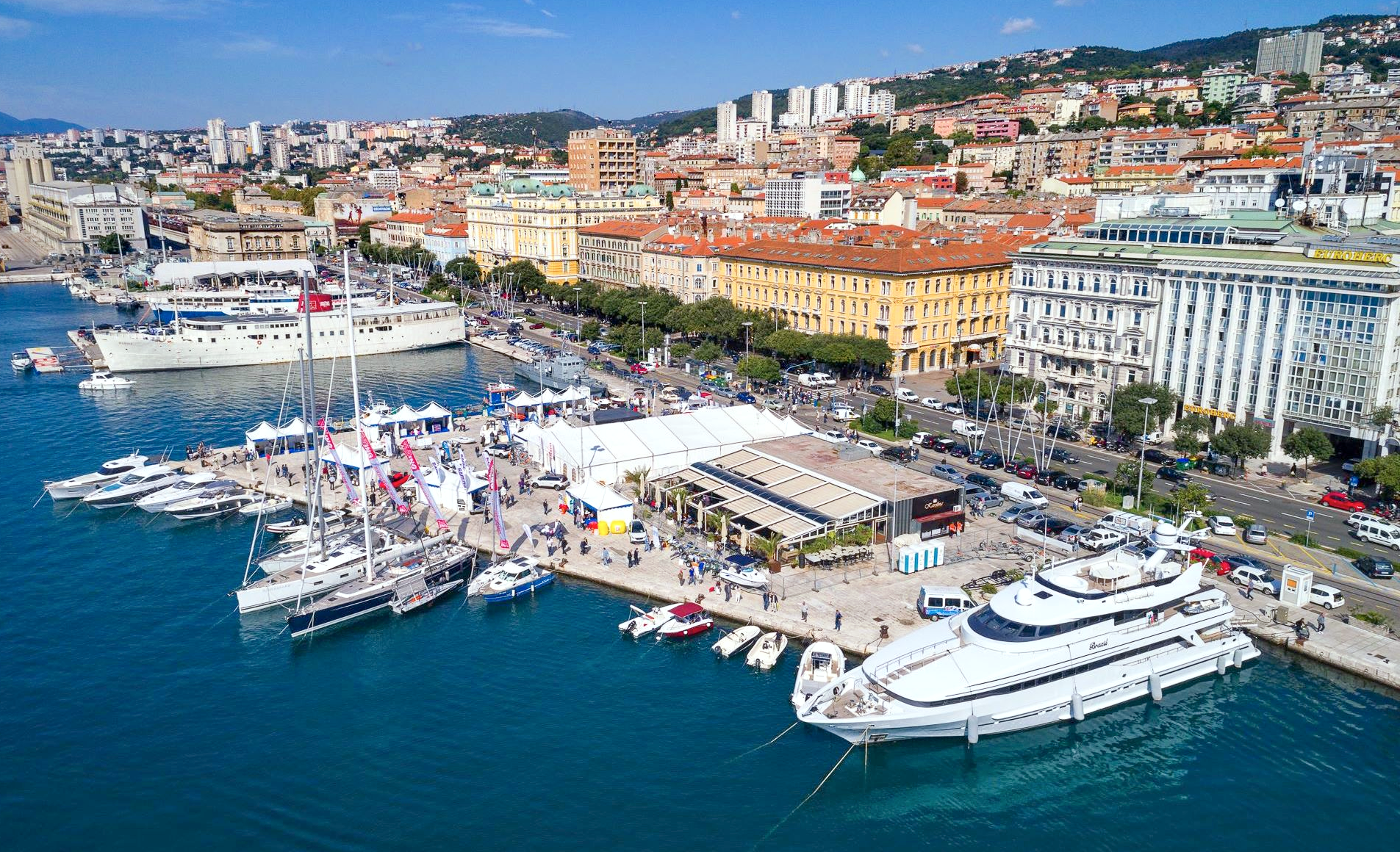
A video postcard introduced Let 3's performance in the first semi-final and final of the Eurovision Song Contest 2023. The postcard was filmed at the Port of Rijeka in March 2023 in collaboration with the host broadcaster BBC. The Whitby Harbour in North Yorkshire and River Port in Kyiv also featured in the Croatian postcard.

According to Eurovision rules, all nations with the exceptions of the host country and the "Big Five" (France, Germany, Italy, Spain and the United Kingdom) are required to qualify from one of two semi-finals in order to compete for the final; the top ten countries from each semi-final progress to the final. The European Broadcasting Union (EBU) split up the competing countries into six different pots based on voting patterns from previous contests, with countries with favourable voting histories put into the same pot. On 31 January 2023, an allocation draw was held, which placed each country into one of the two semi-finals, and determined which half of the show they would perform in. Croatia has been placed into the first semi-final, to be held on 9 May 2023, and has been scheduled to perform in the first half of the show.

Once all the competing songs for the 2023 contest had been released, the running order for the semi-finals was decided by the shows' producers rather than through another draw, so that similar songs were not placed next to each other. Croatia was set to perform in position 7, following the entry from Ireland and before the entry from Switzerland. Immediately after the close of the first semi-final, a press conference was held in which each of the artists drew the half of the final of which they would perform in. Croatia was drawn into the second half of the final and was later selected by the EBU to perform in position number 25, following the entry from Slovenia and before the entry from the United Kingdom.

All three shows were broadcast live in Croatia on television and radio, with commentary provided by Duško Ćurlić for the broadcasts on HRT 1 and HR 2. The first semi-final broadcast on 9 May, which saw the participation of Croatia and the country's first qualification for the final since 2017, received an overnight market share of 38.4% of Croatian television viewers, representing approximately 720,000 households.

=== Semi-final ===
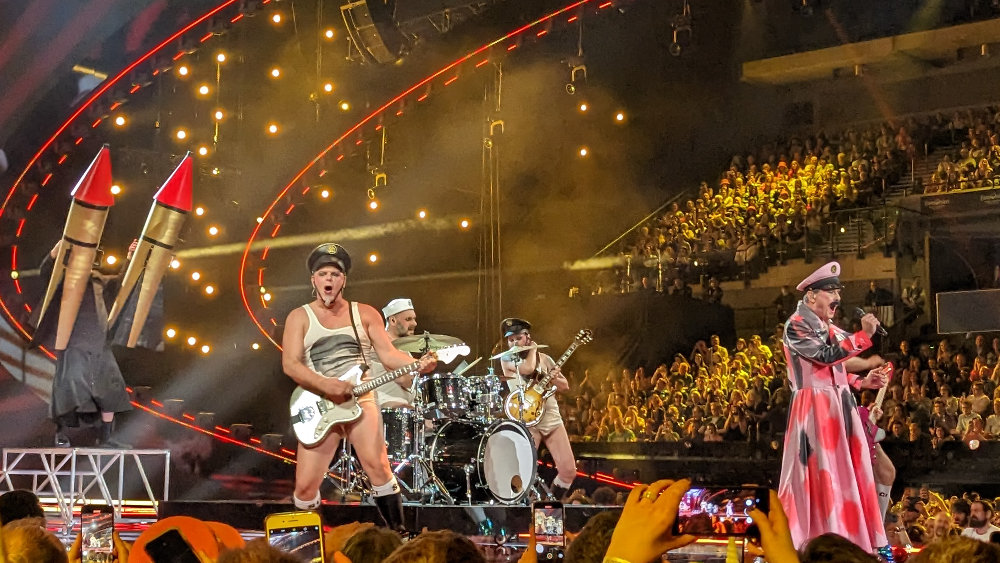
Let 3 during a rehearsal before the first semi-final

Let 3 took part in technical rehearsals on 30 April and 2 May, followed by dress rehearsals on 8 and 9 May. This included the jury show on 8 May where the professional back-up juries of each country watched and voted in a result used if any issues with public televoting occurred.

At the end of the show, Croatia was announced as having finished in the top 10 and subsequently qualifying for the grand final. It was later revealed that Croatia eighth out of the fifteen participating countries in the second semi-final with 76 points, marking the first Croatian qualification to the final since 2017.

=== Final ===
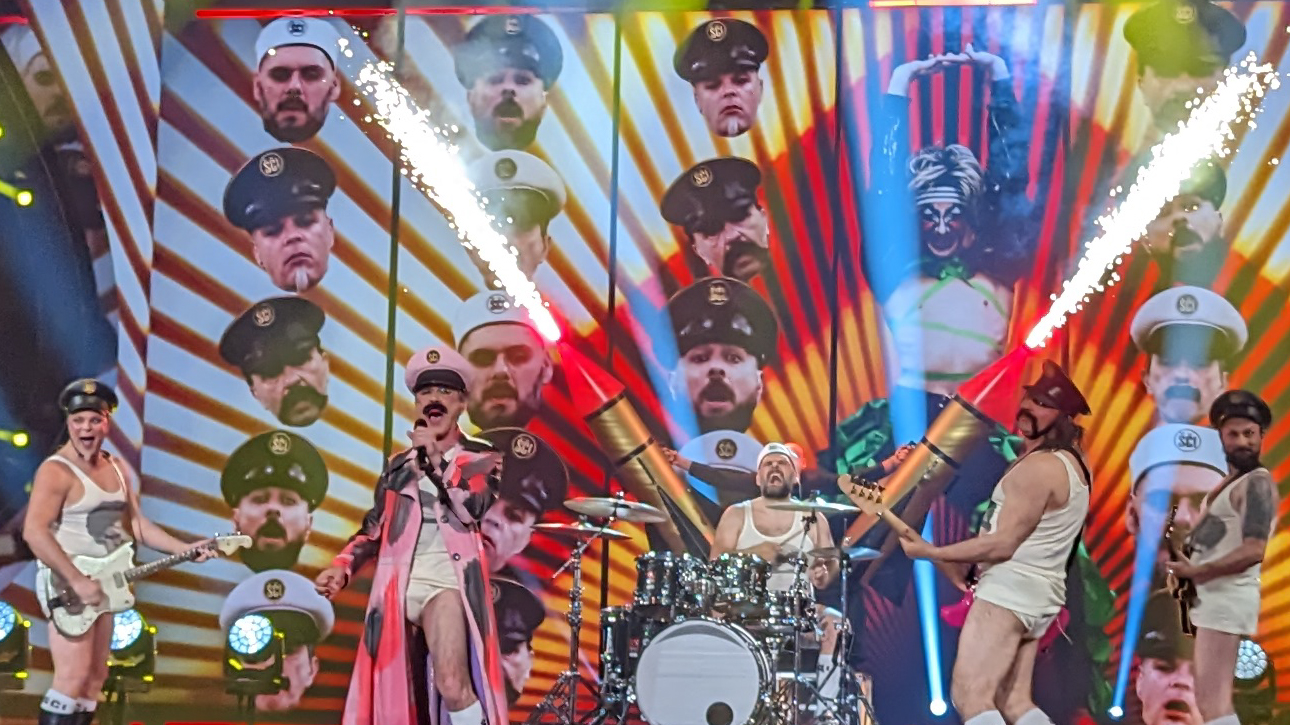
Let 3 during the jury final on 12 May 2023.

Shortly after the first semi-final, a winners' press conference was held for the ten qualifying countries. As part of this press conference, the qualifying artists took part in a draw to determine which half of the grand final they would subsequently participate in. This draw was done in the order the countries appeared in the semi-final running order. Croatia was drawn to compete in the second half. Following this draw, the shows' producers decided upon the running order of the final, as they had done for the semi-finals. Croatia was subsequently placed to perform in position number 25, following the entry from Slovenia and before the entry from the United Kingdom.

Let 3 once again took part in dress rehearsals on 12 and 13 May before the final, including the jury final where the professional juries cast their final votes before the live show on 12 May. The group performed a repeat of their semi-final performance during the final on 13 May. Croatia placed 13th in the final, scoring 123 points; 112 points from the public televoting (seventh place) and 11 points from the juries (twenty-fifth place). This marked Croatia's highest placing since 2017.

=== Voting ===
Below is a breakdown of points awarded to Croatia in the first semi-final and in the final. Voting during the three shows involved each country awarding sets of points from 1-8, 10 and 12: one from their professional jury and the other from televoting in the final vote, while the semi-final vote was based entirely on the vote of the public. The exact composition of the professional jury, and the results of each country's jury and televoting were released after the final. The Croatian jury consisted of Branimir Mihaljević, Damir Kedžo, Nikša Bratoš, Albina Grčić, who represented Croatia in the Eurovision Song Contest 2021, and Jelena Balent. In the first semi-final, Croatia placed 8th with 76 points, receiving maximum twelve points from Serbia. This marked the first Croatian qualification to the final since 2017. In the final, Croatia placed 13th with 123 points, receiving twelve points in the public televote from Slovenia. Over the course of the contest, Croatia awarded its 12 points to Finland in the first semi-final, and to Italy (jury) and Slovenia (televote) in the final.

==== Points awarded to Croatia ====
Points awarded to Croatia (Semi-final 1)
| Score | Televote |
|---|---|
| 12 points | Serbia |
| 10 points | Germany |
| 8 points | |
| 7 points | Latvia |
| 6 points | Finland |
| 5 points | Ireland; Israel; Italy; Sweden; Switzerland |
| 4 points | Czechia; Norway |
| 3 points | Moldova; Rest of the World |
| 2 points | Netherlands |
| 1 point | |

Points awarded to Croatia (Final)
| Score | Televote | Jury |
|---|---|---|
| 12 points | Slovenia | |
| 10 points | Austria; Serbia | |
| 8 points | Albania; Ukraine | Serbia |
| 7 points | | |
| 6 points | Germany; Israel; Poland; Switzerland | |
| 5 points | Iceland; Sweden | |
| 4 points | Australia; Czechia; Finland; Italy; Latvia; Lithuania | |
| 3 points | Rest of the World | Portugal |
| 2 points | Ireland | |
| 1 point | Georgia | |

==== Points awarded by Croatia ====
Points awarded by Croatia (Semi-final 1)
| Score | Televote |
|---|---|
| 12 points | Finland |
| 10 points | Serbia |
| 8 points | Czech Republic |
| 7 points | Israel |
| 6 points | Norway |
| 5 points | Portugal |
| 4 points | Sweden |
| 3 points | Moldova |
| 2 points | Switzerland |
| 1 point | Azerbaijan |

Points awarded by Croatia (Final)
| Score | Televote | Jury |
|---|---|---|
| 12 points | Slovenia | Italy |
| 10 points | Finland | Sweden |
| 8 points | Italy | Israel |
| 7 points | Serbia | Finland |
| 6 points | Albania | Spain |
| 5 points | Norway | Slovenia |
| 4 points | Israel | Serbia |
| 3 points | Czech Republic | Estonia |
| 2 points | Sweden | Moldova |
| 1 point | Moldova | Portugal |

==== Detailed voting results ====
Each nation's jury consisted of five music industry professionals who are citizens of the country they represent, with their names published before the contest to ensure transparency. This jury judged each entry based on: vocal capacity; the stage performance; the song's composition and originality; and the overall impression by the act. In addition, no member of a national jury was permitted to be related in any way to any of the competing acts in such a way that they cannot vote impartially and independently. The individual rankings of each jury member as well as the nation's televoting results were released shortly after the grand final. The following members comprised the Croatian jury:

- Branimir Mihaljević
- Damir Kedžo
- Nikša Bratoš
- Albina Grčić
- Jelena Balent

Detailed voting results from Croatia (Semi-final 1)
| R/O | Country | Televote | |
| R/O | Country | Rank | Points |
|---|---|---|---|
| 01 | Norway | 5 | 6 |
| 02 | Malta | 11 | |
| 03 | Serbia | 2 | 10 |
| 04 | Latvia | 14 | |
| 05 | Portugal | 6 | 5 |
| 06 | Ireland | 13 | |
| 07 | Croatia | | |
| 08 | Switzerland | 9 | 2 |
| 09 | Israel | 4 | 7 |
| 10 | Moldova | 8 | 3 |
| 11 | Sweden | 7 | 4 |
| 12 | Azerbaijan | 10 | 1 |
| 13 | Czech Republic | 3 | 8 |
| 14 | Netherlands | 12 | |
| 15 | Finland | 1 | 12 |

Detailed voting results from Croatia (Final)
| R/O | Country | Jury | | | | | | | Televote | |
| R/O | Country | Juror 1 | Juror 2 | Juror 3 | Juror 4 | Juror 5 | Rank | Points | Rank | Points |
|---|---|---|---|---|---|---|---|---|---|---|
| 01 | Austria | 14 | 13 | 10 | 10 | 14 | 16 | | 15 | |
| 02 | Portugal | 3 | 14 | 19 | 18 | 11 | 10 | 1 | 11 | |
| 03 | Switzerland | 21 | 12 | 18 | 8 | 20 | 20 | | 16 | |
| 04 | Poland | 23 | 23 | 24 | 24 | 25 | 25 | | 14 | |
| 05 | Serbia | 8 | 4 | 6 | 17 | 5 | 7 | 4 | 4 | 7 |
| 06 | France | 17 | 7 | 8 | 14 | 16 | 12 | | 12 | |
| 07 | Cyprus | 15 | 22 | 20 | 3 | 13 | 11 | | 20 | |
| 08 | Spain | 2 | 15 | 3 | 13 | 8 | 5 | 6 | 19 | |
| 09 | Sweden | 7 | 3 | 1 | 2 | 3 | 2 | 10 | 9 | 2 |
| 10 | Albania | 18 | 10 | 15 | 22 | 7 | 17 | | 5 | 6 |
| 11 | Italy | 1 | 2 | 2 | 7 | 4 | 1 | 12 | 3 | 8 |
| 12 | Estonia | 9 | 18 | 13 | 1 | 19 | 8 | 3 | 25 | |
| 13 | Finland | 16 | 6 | 4 | 12 | 1 | 4 | 7 | 2 | 10 |
| 14 | Czech Republic | 24 | 9 | 9 | 11 | 12 | 14 | | 8 | 3 |
| 15 | Australia | 20 | 24 | 23 | 5 | 24 | 18 | | 18 | |
| 16 | Belgium | 10 | 20 | 17 | 25 | 22 | 22 | | 23 | |
| 17 | Armenia | 25 | 21 | 12 | 15 | 15 | 21 | | 22 | |
| 18 | Moldova | 4 | 16 | 14 | 6 | 9 | 9 | 2 | 10 | 1 |
| 19 | Ukraine | 22 | 19 | 22 | 4 | 21 | 15 | | 13 | |
| 20 | Norway | 19 | 11 | 7 | 16 | 10 | 13 | | 6 | 5 |
| 21 | Germany | 11 | 25 | 25 | 23 | 23 | 24 | | 17 | |
| 22 | Lithuania | 12 | 17 | 21 | 21 | 18 | 23 | | 24 | |
| 23 | Israel | 5 | 1 | 5 | 9 | 6 | 3 | 8 | 7 | 4 |
| 24 | Slovenia | 6 | 5 | 11 | 20 | 2 | 6 | 5 | 1 | 12 |
| 25 | Croatia | | | | | | | | | |
| 26 | United Kingdom | 13 | 8 | 16 | 19 | 17 | 19 | | 21 | |
