= El Desperado (album) =

Studio album by Let 3
- Released: December 18, 1991
- Recorded: March to July 1991
- Studio: Studio Tivoli
- Genre: Rock, Alternative rock
- Length: 42:20
- Label: Helidon
- Producer: Goran Lisica

Let 3 chronology
Two dogs fuckin' (1989)	El Desperado (1991)	Peace (1994)

Singles from El Desperado
- 1. "Vjeran Pas" Released: 1991

El Desperado is the second album by rock band, Let 3. The album was released in 1989 by Helidon.

The album was digitally remastered in 2009 by Dallas Records following the 20 year anniversary of the album Two dogs fuckin' alongside the album.

The song Vjeran Pas is a cover of the song with the same name from the rock band Termiti of which Mrle was a part of. The lyrics are credited to Predrag Kraljević, the former frontman of Termiti.

== Reception ==
Professional ratings
Review scores
Source	Rating
Terapija.net	7/10 stars

The album was received as a nice follow up to their previous album by fans and critics.

== Track listing ==
No.	Title	Producer(s)	Length
1.	"El Desperado" (Trumpet - Jaka Hawlina)	Goran Lisica	3:26
2.	"Voules Vous"	Goran Lisica	3:46
3.	"Fuck Famiglia"	Goran Lisica	4:16
4.	"Pokvarena Žena"	Goran Lisica	4:21
5.	"Pogibe" (Backing Vocals, Handclaps – Alfa Camera, Trombone – Marko Lovrić Markus, Trumpet – Jaka Hawlina)	Goran Lisica	5:29
6.	"Vjeran Pas" (Keyboards – Josip Krošnjak Pepi)	Goran Lisica	4:07
7.	"Fahrenheite"	Goran Lisica	4:18
8.	"Ha Ha Ha"	Goran Lisica	2:43
9.	"Love Killer" (Rap – M.C. Kunndalini)	Goran Lisica	3:04
10.	"Ciklama"	Goran Lisica	0:50
11.	"Mona"	Goran Lisica	6:00
Total length:			42:20

Remastered bonus tracks
No.	Title	Length
12.	"Elevry Budy Nous' A"	2:35
13.	"Pokvarena Žena (Live)"	4:02
14.	"Pogibe (Live)"	6:23
15.	"Fahrenheite (Live)"	3:42
Total length:		59:17

== Personnel ==
- Damir Martinović – Mrle (bass, vocal)
- Zoran Prodanović – Prlja (vocal)
- Ivica Dražić – Miki (guitar, voice)
- Zoran Klasić – Klas (guitar, voice)
- Dean Benzia (drums, voice)
- Backing Vocals – Edi Kraljić, Nina Simić
- Design – Dalibor Laginja
- Executive Producer – Goran Lisica
- Keyboards – Raoul Varljen
- Lyrics By – Damir Martinović (tracks: 1, 3, 6 to 14), Igor Večerina (tracks: 11),

Zoran Prodanović (tracks: 1, 3, 5, 8, 15), Predrag Kraljević (tracks: 6)

- Recorded By – Toni Jurij (tracks: 12 to 14)
- Recorded By, Mixed By, Producer – Janez Križaj
