= Mama ŠČ! =

2023 single by Let 3

Single by Let 3

from the album ŠČ!
- Language: Croatian
- Released: 20 January 2023
- Length: 2:34
- Label: Dallas
- Composers: Damir Martinović; Zoran Prodanović
- Lyricist: Damir Martinović

Let 3 singles chronology
"Drama (Remake)" (2022)	"Mama ŠČ!" (2023)	"Babaroga" (2024)

Audio
- "Mama ŠČ!" on YouTube

Lyric video
- "Mama ŠČ!" on YouTube

Music video
- "Mama ŠČ!" on YouTube

Eurovision Song Contest 2023 entry
- Country: Croatia

Finals performance
- Semi-final result: 8th
- Semi-final points: 76
- Final result: 13th
- Final points: 123

Entry chronology
- ◄ "Guilty Pleasure" (2022)
- "Rim Tim Tagi Dim" (2024) ►

Official performance video
- "Mama ŠČ!" (First Semi-Final) on YouTube "Mama ŠČ!" (Grand Final) on YouTube

"Mama ŠČ!" (Croatian pronunciation: [mâma ʃtʃə̂]) (Note: In order to be pronounced, the final syllable is realised with a schwa, normally not part of the phonology of the Croatian language.) is a song by Croatian shock rock band Let 3, released on 20 January 2023. The song represented Croatia in the Eurovision Song Contest 2023 after winning Dora 2023, Croatia's national selection for that year's Eurovision Song Contest. The song peaked at number one in Croatia and entered the charts in Iceland and Lithuania.

== Background and composition ==
In interviews with Jutarnji list, the band reported that the song title is a reference to the Russian letter Shcha (Щ). The song, according to the band, is an anti-war song; in the interview, the band reported that after total Armageddon has been waged on Earth, a rocket would land on Earth, containing the letters "ŠČ". In other interviews, the band has also claimed that "ŠČ" could also mean the sound someone makes when somebody orgasms, a blood type, or a sound someone makes when they are meditating.

In further interviews with the Croatian newsite Pressing, the band claimed that the song was a metaphor for the Russian Federation. The band claims that in the song, they mock dictators for being "childish", with an emphasis on the Russian president Vladimir Putin and his decision to launch the Russian invasion of Ukraine.

According to Hrvoje Cvijanović, the "tractor", which is mentioned numerous times in the song, is symbolism for the Belarusian president Alexander Lukashenko, who has aided Russia in the invasion, including by gifting a tractor to Putin for his 70th birthday. The song criticizes both leaders, calling them "psychopaths", although rather allusively, since performers are precluded from promoting political messages in the Eurovision Song Contest.

== Commercial performance ==
On the issue of 6 February 2023, "Mama ŠČ!" debuted at number 27 on the Croatian HR Top 40 chart. This marks the band's first chart entry in less than a year, the last being "Drama", a collaboration with Croatian singer Alka Vuica in early 2022 issued on 21 March. In its second week on the chart, the song fell two spots to number 29. After the performance at Dora 2023, the song rose to a new peak at number four in its third week on the chart. By peaking at number four, "Mama ŠČ" became the band's highest-charting song on the HR Top 40 chart to date. A week later, in its fourth week on the chart, the song topped the chart becoming Let 3's first chart topper in Croatia.

In the week of 25 February 2023, "Mama ŠČ" debuted at number six on Billboard's Croatia Songs chart, becoming the band's first song to do so. It was also Croatia's first Eurovision entry to chart on the Croatia Songs chart. The song stayed on the chart for a total of four weeks.

== Eurovision Song Contest ==
=== Dora 2023 ===
Dora 2023 was the twenty-fourth edition of Dora, a music competition which selects Croatia's entry for the Eurovision Song Contest. The competition consisted of eighteen entries competing in one final on 11 February 2023.

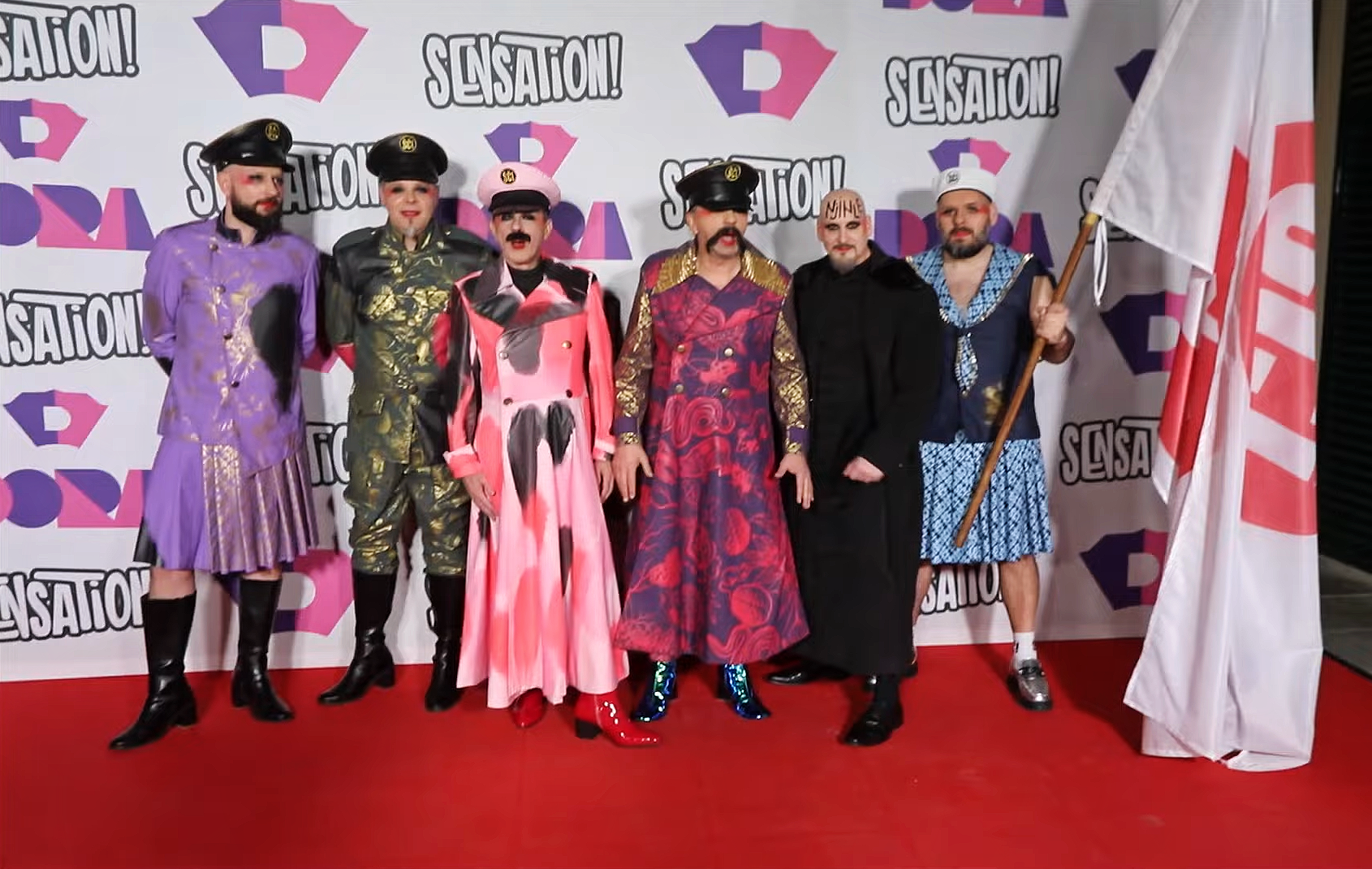
Let 3 on Dora 2023

The song was considered by Croatian media outlets as a heavy favorite within the public to win Dora 2023. During their live performance, the band were dressed in stereotypical military uniforms, with one member dressing up as Vladimir Lenin holding two rockets. All members had roses in between their buttocks. At the end of the show's voting, it was revealed that "Mama ŠČ!" had won the competition, thus earning the Croatian spot for the Eurovision Song Contest 2023. After winning Dora, Let 3 announced that they might travel to Liverpool on an ecologically acceptable tractor "with [the] steering wheel on the other side" since they were going to the United Kingdom.

=== At Eurovision ===
According to Eurovision rules, all nations with the exceptions of the host country and the "Big Five" (France, Germany, Italy, Spain and the United Kingdom) are required to qualify from one of two semi-finals in order to compete for the final; the top ten countries from each semi-final progress to the final. Croatia had been placed into the first semi-final, to be held on 9 May 2023, and was scheduled to perform in the first half of the show. Unlike previous years, the semi finals were determined by televote only, instead of both jury and televote.

Croatia performed in slot 7 during the first semi final on 9 May 2023. At the end of the show, it was announced that Croatia had qualified for the Grand Final. It was later announced that they had placed 8th out of 15 in the semi final, with 76 points. On the final on 13 May, they placed 13th overall with 123 points, including being ranked 7th with the televoters with 112 points.

== Charts ==
Chart performance for "Mama ŠČ!"
Chart (2023)	Peak position
Croatia (Billboard)	6
Croatia Domestic Airplay (HR Top 40)	1
Iceland (Tónlistinn)	37
Lithuania (AGATA)	24
