= Uuden Musiikin Kilpailu =

Finnish TV music contest

- Logo since 2020
- Also known as: Tävlingen för ny musik (Swedish); Contest for New Music (English)
- Genre: Music, entertainment, reality television
- Presented by: Jorma Uotinen, Sami Sykkö, Jasmin Beloued (2026); Sanni, Jasmin Beloued (2025); Benjamin, Pilvi Hämäläinen and Viivi Pumpanen (2024); Samu Haber (2023); Paula Vesala and Miisa Rotola-Pukkila (2022); Antti Tuisku (2021); Krista Siegfrids (2016–2020); Roope Salminen (2015–2016); Rakel Liekki (2015); Anne Lainto (2012–2014); Ilkka Uusivuori (2013–2014); Joona Kortesmäki (2012)
- Country of origin: Finland
- Original language: Finnish
- No. of series: 15

Production
- Executive producers: Anssi Autio (2012–2026); Mikko Silvennoinen (2026–present)
- Running time: ~120 minutes
- Production company: Yleisradio (Yle)

Original release
- Network: Yle TV2
- Release: 27 January 2012 – 2 March 2019
- Network: Yle TV1
- Release: 7 March 2020 – present

Related
- Finland in the Eurovision Song Contest

Uuden Musiikin Kilpailu (Finnish: [ˈuːden ˈmusiːkin ˈkilpɑi̯lu]; abbreviated UMK; Swedish: Tävlingen för ny musik; English: Contest for New Music) is an annual music contest organised by the Finnish public broadcaster Yleisradio (Yle). It made its debut in 2012 as the Finnish selection format for the Eurovision Song Contest, replacing the previous Finnish Eurovision selection Suomen euroviisukarsinta which had been held since 1961.

== Winners ==
Table key
First place
Second place
Third place
Last place

Year	Song	Artist	Results at Eurovision			
Year	Song	Artist	Final	Points	Semi	Points
2012	"När jag blundar"	Pernilla Karlsson	Failed to qualify		12	41
2013	"Marry Me"	Krista Siegfrids	24	13	9	64
2014	"Something Better"	Softengine	11	72	3	97
2015	"Aina mun pitää"	Pertti Kurikan Nimipäivät	Failed to qualify		16	13
2016	"Sing It Away"	Sandhja	Failed to qualify		15	51
2017	"Blackbird"	Norma John	Failed to qualify		12	92
2018	"Monsters"	Saara Aalto	25	46	10	108
2019	"Look Away"	Darude feat. Sebastian Rejman	Failed to qualify		17	23
2020	"Looking Back"	Aksel Kankaanranta	Contest cancelled due to the COVID-19 pandemic			
2021	"Dark Side"	Blind Channel	6	301	5	234
2022	"Jezebel"	The Rasmus	21	38	7	162
2023	"Cha Cha Cha"	Käärijä	2	526	1	177
2024	"No Rules!"	Windows95man	19	38	7	59
2025	"Ich komme"	Erika Vikman	11	196	3	115
2026	"Liekinheitin"	Linda Lampenius and Pete Parkkonen	6	279	3	227

== Editions ==
=== 2012 ===
The final took place on 25 February 2012 at the Helsinki Ice Hall in Helsinki where the six finalist songs were performed and the viewers selected a winner. The show featured interval performances by The Rasmus, Anna Abreu, and 2011 Finnish entrant Paradise Oskar. The first of two rounds of televoting selected "När jag blundar" performed by Pernilla Karlsson, "Laululeija" performed by Stig and "Lasikaupunki" performed by Ville Eetvartti as the three super finalists. In the second round of televoting, Pernilla Karlsson and the song "När jag blundar" was the winner.

R/O	Artist	Song	Music (m) / Lyrics (l)	Televote		Place
R/O	Artist	Song	Music (m) / Lyrics (l)	Round 1	Round 2	Place
1	Iconcrash	"We Are the Night"	Janni Peuhu (m & l), Rory Winston (l)	—	—	—
2	Pernilla Karlsson	"När jag blundar"	Jonas Karlsson (m & l)	29.8%	53.4%	1
3	Mica Ikonen	"Antaa mennä"	Lauri Hämäläinen (m & l), Mica Ikonen (m & l)	—	—	—
4	Kaisa Vala	"Habits of Human Beings"	Kaisa Vala (m & l)	—	—	—
5	Stig	"Laululeija"	Matti Mikkola (m), DJPP (m), Paula Vesala (l)	17%	17.8%	3
6	Ville Eetvartti	"Lasikaupunki"	Jyri Sariola (m), Tero Myllyvirta (l), Joni Pekkarinen (l)	18%	28.7%	2

=== 2013 ===
The final took place on 9 February 2013 at the Barona Areena in Espoo where the eight finalist songs were performed and the jury and viewers selected a winner. The show featured interval performances by Teflon Brothers and Stig, last year's Eurovision Song Contest entrant Pernilla Karlsson, 2007 Eurovision entrant Hanna Pakarinen, Emma Salokoski and Suvi Teräsniska. After combining the jury (50%) and televote (50%), Krista Siegfrids and the song "Marry Me" emerged as the winner.

Final – 9 February 2013
R/O	Artist	Song	Music & Lyrics (m & l)	Jury (50%)	Televote (50%)	Total	Place
1	Arion	"Lost"	Iivo Kaipainen (m & l)	13.5%	7.0%	10.2%	5
2	Elina Orkoneva	"He's Not My Man"	Elina Orkoneva (m & l)	11.5%	5.2%	8.4%	6
3	Lucy Was Driving	"Dancing All Around The Universe"	Lucy Was Driving (m), Otso Koskelo (l)	9.6%	1.6%	5.6%	7
4	Krista Siegfrids	"Marry Me"	Krista Siegfrieds (m & l), Erik Nyholm (m & l), Kristofer Karlsson (m & l), Jessika Lundström (m & l)	14.6%	38.6%	26.6%	1
5	Last Panda	"Saturday Night Forever"	Henry Tikkanen (m & l), Aapo Immonen (m & l)	9.2%	1.4%	5.3%	8
6	Mikael Saari	"We Should Be Through"	Mikael Saari (m & l)	14.6%	18.4%	16.5%	2
7	Great Wide North	"Flags"	Kaj Kiviniemi (m & l), Mika Kiviniemi (m)	14.6%	12.0%	13.3%	4
8	Diandra	"Colliding into You"	Patrick Sarin (m), Leri Leskinen (m), Sharon Vaughn (l)	12.3%	15.8%	14.1%	3

=== 2014 ===
The final took place on 1 February 2014 at the Barona Areena in Espoo where the eight finalist songs were performed and the combination of votes from the jury and public televote selected a winner. In addition to the performances from the competing artists, the winner of UMK 2013, Krista Siegfrids, performed her single "Cinderella" during the interval. Softengine was the winner of the competition with the song "Something Better".

Final – 1 February 2014
R/O	Artist	Song	T. Wirtanen	A. Puurtinen	T. Saarinen	Redrama	Jury Total	Jury (%)	Televote (%)	Total	Place
1	Softengine	"Something Better"	8	10	10	10	38	18.27%	28.28%	23.28%	1
2	Hanna Sky	"Hope"	3	7	4	5	19	9.13%	—	9.13%	7
3	Miau	"God/Drug"	10	9	7	6	32	15.38%	13.94%	14.66%	3
4	Lauri Mikkola	"Going Down"	5	6	5	7	23	11.06%	—	11.06%	5
5	MadCraft	"Shining Bright"	4	3	3	3	13	6.25%	—	6.25%	8
6	Mikko Pohjola	"Sängyn reunalla"	9	8	9	9	35	16.83%	19.48%	18.16%	2
7	Clarissa feat. Josh Standing	"Top of the World"	6	4	6	4	20	9.62%	—	9.62%	6
8	Hukka ja Mama	"Selja"	7	5	8	8	28	13.46%	—	13.46%	4

=== 2015 ===
It was confirmed that Uuden Musiikin Kilpailu would return in 2015, for its fourth series. Three semi-finals were held on 7 February, 14 February, and 21 February 2015 while the final was held on 28 February 2015. It was held at the YLE TV Studios in Helsinki.

Final – 28 February 2015
R/O	Artist	Song	Jury (10%)	Televote (90%)	Total	Place
1	Shava	"Ostarilla"	1.2%	2.2%	3.4%	8
2	Satin Circus	"Crossroads"	2.1%	24.2%	26.3%	2
3	Solju	"Hold Your Colours"	0.7%	5.8%	6.5%	4
4	Järjestyshäiriö	"Särkyneiden sydänten kulmilla"	0.9%	2.4%	3.3%	9
5	Norlan "El Misionario"	"No voy a llorar por ti"	0.4%	3.7%	4.1%	7
6	Opera Skaala	"Heart of Light"	1.6%	6.7%	8.3%	3
7	Jouni Aslak	"Lions & Lambs"	1.1%	3.3%	4.4%	6
8	Pertti Kurikan Nimipäivät	"Aina mun pitää"	1.2%	36.2%	37.4%	1
9	Angelo De Nile	"All For Victory"	0.8%	5.5%	6.3%	5

=== 2016 ===
It was confirmed that Uuden Musiikin Kilpailu would return in 2016, for its fifth series. Three semi-finals were held on 6 February, 13 February, and 20 February 2016 while the final was held on 27 February 2016. Like the previous year, it was held at YLE TV Studios in Helsinki.

Final – 27 February 2016
R/O	Artist	Song	Jury	Public Vote				Total	Place
R/O	Artist	Song	Jury	Before Show	During Show	Total	Points	Total	Place
1	Cristal Snow	"Love Is Blind"	41	12%	9%	9.1%	39	80	6
2	Stella Christine	"Ain't Got Time for Boys"	19	6%	7%	6.5%	28	47	8
3	Annica Milán and Kimmo Blom	"Good Enough"	35	10%	11%	10.7%	46	81	5
4	Eini	"Draamaa"	32	4%	7%	6.7%	29	61	7
5	Barbe-Q-Barbies	"Let Me Out"	46	12%	9%	9.1%	39	85	4
6	Tuuli Okkonen	"Don't Wake Me Up"	20	4%	5%	4.9%	21	41	9
7	Sandhja	"Sing It Away"	98	16%	14%	14.4%	62	160	1
8	Saara Aalto	"No Fear"	67	11%	21%	20.2%	87	154	2
9	Mikael Saari	"On It Goes"	72	25%	17%	18.4%	79	151	3

=== 2017 ===
It was confirmed that Uuden Musiikin Kilpailu would return in 2017, for its sixth series. Unlike previous years, there were no semi-finals, only a single final held on 28 January 2017 at the Espoo Metro Areena, and the show used international juries instead of Finnish juries.

Final – 28 January 2017
R/O	Artist	Song	Jury	Televote	Total	Place
1	Emma	"Circle of Light"	53	53	106	3
2	Alva	"Arrows"	15	48	63	6
3	Günther & D'Sanz	"Love Yourself"	37	45	82	5
4	Anni Saikku	"Reach Out for the Sun"	43	16	59	7
5	Knucklebone Oscar & The Shangri-La Rubies	"Caveman"	5	13	18	10
6	Norma John	"Blackbird"	94	88	182	1
7	Lauri Yrjölä	"Helppo elämä"	43	15	58	8
8	Club La Persé	"My Little World"	21	29	50	9
9	Zühlke	"Perfect Villain"	74	71	145	2
10	My First Band	"Paradise"	45	52	97	4

=== 2018 ===
Yle selected Saara Aalto internally to represent Finland in the Eurovision Song Contest 2018. Aalto performed three songs and the winning song was selected by viewers and international juries. The show was held on 3 March 2018 at the Espoo Metro Areena.

R/O	Song	Composer(s)	Jury	Televote	Total	Place
1	"Monsters"	Saara Aalto, Joy Deb, Linnea Deb, Ki Fitzgerald	88	95	183	1
2	"Domino"	Thomas G:son, Bobby Ljunggren, Johnny Sanchez, Will Taylor, Saara Aalto	84	75	159	2
3	"Queens"	Farley Arvidsson, Charlie Walshe, Tom Aspaul, Saara Aalto	68	70	138	3

=== 2019 ===
The 2019 edition took place on 2 March 2019. Yle announced on 29 January 2019 that they had internally selected Darude to perform three songs, similarly to how Saara Aalto's song was selected in the previous edition.

Darude performed three songs, featuring vocalist Sebastian Rejman, and the winning song was selected by viewers and international juries. The show was held on 2 March 2019 at Logomo in Turku.

R/O	Song	Composer(s)	Jury	Televote	Total	Place
1	"Release Me"	Ville Virtanen, Jaakko Manninen, Brandyn Burnette	70	19	89	3
2	"Superman"	Ville Virtanen, Chris Hope, Thom Bridges	74	73	147	2
3	"Look Away"	Sebastian Rejman, Ville Virtanen	96	148	244	1

=== 2020 ===
The 2020 edition was held on 7 March 2020 in Tampere.

Final – 7 March 2020
R/O	Artist	Song	Jury	Televote			Total	Place
R/O	Artist	Song	Jury	Votes	Percentage	Points	Total	Place
1	Catharina Zühlke	"Eternity"	42	8,600	7.5%	24	66	5
2	Erika Vikman	"Cicciolina"	58	35,431	30.9%	99	157	2
3	Aksel Kankaanranta	"Looking Back"	76	33,711	29.4%	94	170	1
4	F3M	"Bananas"	64	7,167	6.3%	20	84	4
5	Sansa	"Lover View"	30	2,121	1.8%	6	36	6
6	Tika	"I Let My Heart Break"	50	27,634	24.1%	77	127	3

=== 2021 ===
The 2021 edition was held on 20 February 2021 in Tampere.

Final – 20 February 2021
R/O	Artist	Song	Jury	Televote			Total	Place
R/O	Artist	Song	Jury	Votes	Percentage	Points	Total	Place
1	Teflon Brothers and Pandora	"I Love You"	30	23,493	17.0%	150	180	2
2	Aksel	"Hurt"	56	8,154	5.9%	52	108	5
3	Laura	"Play"	4	1,382	1.0%	9	13	7
4	Danny	"Sinä päivänä kun kaikki rakastaa mua"	22	5,942	4.3%	38	60	6
5	Oskr	"Lie"	62	8,292	6.0%	53	115	4
6	Blind Channel	"Dark Side"	72	75,040	54.3%	479	551	1
7	Ilta	"Kelle mä soitan"	48	15,892	11.5%	101	149	3

=== 2022 ===
The 2022 edition was held on 26 February 2022 at Logomo.

Final – 26 February 2022
R/O	Artist	Song	Jury	Televote			Total	Place
R/O	Artist	Song	Jury	Votes	Percentage	Points	Total	Place
1	The Rasmus	"Jezebel"	68	41,758	27.4%	242	310	1
2	Isaac Sene	"Kuuma jäbä"	28	17,069	11.2%	99	127	5
3	Olivera	"Thank God I'm an Atheist"	46	20,879	13.7%	121	167	4
4	Bess	"Ram pam pam"	56	25,604	16.8%	148	204	3
5	Younghearted	"Sun numero"	40	8,839	5.8%	51	91	6
6	Cyan Kicks	"Hurricane"	52	29,261	19.2%	169	221	2
7	Tommi Läntinen	"Elämä kantaa mua"	4	8,992	5.9%	52	56	7

=== 2023 ===
The 2023 edition was held on 25 February 2023 at Logomo in Turku.

Final – 25 February 2023
R/O	Artist	Song	Jury	Televote			Total	Place
R/O	Artist	Song	Jury	Votes	Percentage	Points	Total	Place
1	Robin Packalen	"Girls Like You"	28	21,303	9.2%	81	109	4
2	Kuumaa	"Ylivoimainen"	44	16,569	7.1%	63	107	5
3	Käärijä	"Cha Cha Cha"	72	122,822	52.9%	467	539	1
4	Keira	"No Business on the Dancefloor"	42	23,933	10.3%	91	133	3
5	Benjamin	"Hoida mut"	34	8,416	3.6%	32	66	7
6	Lxandra	"Something to Lose"	46	6,312	2.7%	24	70	6
7	Portion Boys	"Samaa taivasta katsotaan"	28	32,613	14.1%	124	152	2

=== 2024 ===
The 2024 edition was held on 10 February 2024 at Nokia Arena in Tampere.

Final – 10 February 2024
R/O	Artist	Song	Jury	Televote			Total	Place
R/O	Artist	Song	Jury	Votes	Percentage	Points	Total	Place
1	Sini Sabotage	"Kuori mua"	38	6,872	3.06%	27	65	7
2	Cyan Kicks	"Dancing with Demons"	48	20,392	9.08%	80	128	4
3	Jesse Markin	"Glow"	34	19,381	8.63%	76	110	5
4	Mikael Gabriel and Nublu	"Vox populi"	42	34,675	15.44%	136	178	3
5	Sara Siipola	"Paskana"	70	51,743	23.04%	203	273	2
6	Sexmane	"Mania"	34	18,864	8.40%	74	108	6
7	Windows95man	"No Rules!"	28	72,651	32.35%	285	313	1

=== 2025 ===
The 2025 edition was held on 8 February 2025 at Nokia Arena in Tampere.

Final – 8 February 2025
R/O	Artist	Song	Jury	Televote			Total	Place
R/O	Artist	Song	Jury	Votes	Percentage	Points	Total	Place
1	Costee	"Sekaisin"	40	16,700	4.88%	43	83	6
2	Neea River	"Nightmares"	24	23,302	6.80%	60	84	5
3	Goldielocks	"Made Of"	74	88,937	25.96%	229	303	2
4	Viivi	"Aina"	38	38,837	11.34%	100	138	3
5	Nelli Matula	"Hitaammin hautaan"	50	34,177	9.98%	88	138	4
6	Erika Vikman	"Ich komme"	68	140,590	41.04%	362	430	1

=== 2026 ===
The 2026 edition was held on 28 February 2026 at Nokia Arena in Tampere.

Final – 28 February 2026
R/O	Artist	Song	Jury	Televote			Total	Place
R/O	Artist	Song	Jury	Votes	Percentage	Points	Total	Place
1	Komiat	"Lululai"	40	38,414	8.2%	76	116	3
2	Etta	"Million Dollar Smile"	12	15,187	3.4%	30	42	6
3	Kiki	"Rakkaudenkipee"	28	7,146	1.6%	14	42	7
4	Antti Paalanen	"Takatukka"	58	76,829	17.2%	152	210	2
5	Chachi	"Cherry Cake"	32	33,947	7.6%	67	99	4
6	Sinikka Monte	"Ready to Leave"	46	25,907	5.8%	51	97	5
7	Linda Lampenius and Pete Parkkonen	"Liekinheitin"	78	249,248	55.8%	492	570	1
