= Finland in the Eurovision Song Contest 2016 =

- Eurovision Song Contest 2016
- Participating broadcaster: Yleisradio (Yle)
- Country: Finland
- Selection process: Uuden Musiikin Kilpailu 2016
- Selection date: 27 February 2016

Competing entry
- Song: "Sing It Away"
- Artist: Sandhja
- Songwriters: Sandhja Kuivalainen; Milos Rosas; Heikki Korhonen; Petri Matara; Markus Savijoki

Placement
- Semi-final result: Failed to qualify (15th)

Participation chronology

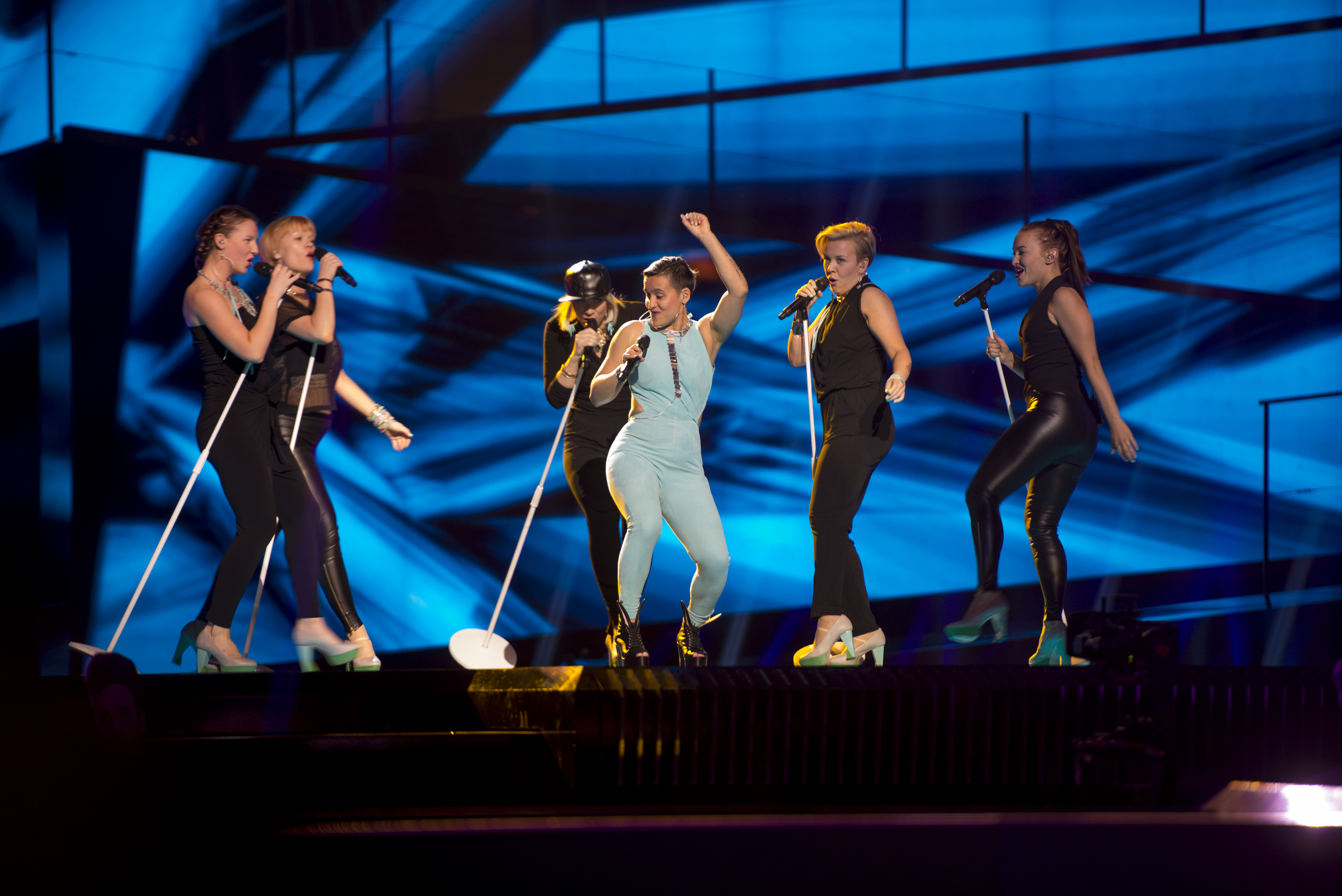

Finland was represented at the Eurovision Song Contest 2016 with the song "Sing It Away" written by Sandhja Kuivalainen, Milos Rosas, Heikki Korhonen, Petri Matara, and Markus Savijoki, and performed by Sandhja. The Finnish participating broadcaster, Yleisradio (Yle), organised the national final Uuden Musiikin Kilpailu 2016 in order to select its entry for the contest. 18 entries were selected to compete in the national final, which consisted of three semi-finals and a final, taking place in February 2016. Six entries competed in each semi-final and the top three from each semi-final, as selected solely by a public vote, advanced to the final. Nine entries competed in the final on 27 February where the 50/50 combination of votes from ten jury groups representing different factions of Finnish society and votes from the public selected "Sing It Away" performed by Sandhja as the winner.

Finland was drawn to compete in the first semi-final of the Eurovision Song Contest which took place on 10 May 2016. Performing as the opening entry for the show in position 1, "Sing It Away" was not announced among the top 10 entries of the first semi-final and therefore did not qualify to compete in the final. It was later revealed that Finland placed fifteenth out of the 18 participating countries in the semi-final with 51 points.

== Background ==
Prior to the 2016 contest, Yleisradio (Yle) had participated in the Eurovision Song Contest representing Finland forty-nine times since its first entry in 1961. It has won the contest once in 2006 with the song "Hard Rock Hallelujah" performed by Lordi. In 2015, "Aina mun pitää" performed by Pertti Kurikan Nimipäivät failed to qualify Finland to the final, placing last in the semi-final.

As part of its duties as participating broadcaster, Yle organises the selection of its entry in the Eurovision Song Contest and broadcasts the event in the country. The broadcaster confirmed its intentions to participate at the 2016 contest on 26 May 2015. Yle had selected its entries for the contest through national final competitions that have varied in format over the years. Between 1961 and 2011, a selection show that was often titled Euroviisukarsinta highlighted that the purpose of the program was to select a song for Eurovision. However, since 2012, the broadcaster has organised the selection show Uuden Musiikin Kilpailu (UMK), which focuses on showcasing new music with the winning song being selected as the Finnish entry for that year. Along with its participation confirmation, the broadcaster also announced that its entry for the 2016 contest would be selected through Uuden Musiikin Kilpailu 2016.

== Before Eurovision ==
=== Uuden Musiikin Kilpailu 2016 ===
Uuden Musiikin Kilpailu 2016 was the fifth edition of Uuden Musiikin Kilpailu (UMK), the music competition that selects Finland's entries for the Eurovision Song Contest. The competition consisted of four shows that commenced with the first of three semi-finals on 6 February 2016 and concluded with a final on 27 February 2016. The four shows were held at the YLE Studios in Helsinki and hosted by Finnish actor/singer/rapper Roope Salminen and 2013 Finnish Eurovision entrant Krista Siegfrids. Due to Siegfrids participation in the Swedish Eurovision Song Contest 2016 national final Melodifestivalen 2016 on 13 February, Salminen hosted the second semi-final alone. Rakel Liekki and Mikko Silvennoinen presented an after-show programme that took place following the announcement of the qualifiers in each semi-final and during the final. All shows were broadcast on Yle TV2 and online at yle.fi/umk. The final was also broadcast online at the official Eurovision Song Contest website eurovision.tv as well as via radio on Yle Radio Suomi and with commentary in Swedish by Eva Frantz and Johan Lindroos on Yle X3M.

==== Format ====
The format of the competition consisted of four shows: three semi-finals and a final. Six songs competed in each semi-final and the top three entries from each semi-final qualified to complete the nine-song lineup in the final. The results for the semi-finals were determined exclusively by a public vote, while the results in the final were determined by the 50/50 combination of public voting and jury voting. Public voting included the options of telephone, SMS and online voting. Prior to each of the four shows, the public was able to vote in advance online between Monday to Thursday. The proceeds from the public voting were donated to the Nose Day Foundation (Nenäpäivä-säätiö), which funds projects in developing nations.

==== Competing entries ====
A submission period was opened by Yle which lasted between 1 September 2015 and 8 September 2015. The competition allowed entries longer than three minutes to compete, however, should the winning song be longer than three minutes, it would have to be shortened for the Eurovision Song Contest. At least one of the writers and the lead singer(s) had to hold Finnish citizenship or live in Finland permanently in order for the entry to qualify to compete. A panel of experts appointed by Yle selected eighteen entries for the competition from the received submissions. The competing entries along with their promotional music videos were presented during a live streamed press conference on 12 January 2016, hosted by Krista Siegfrids, Rakel Liekki and Mikko Silvennoinen. The competing entries were also presented in a televised preview programme on 30 January 2016, hosted by Rakel Liekki, where a panel of guests consisting of Essi Hellén, Mikko Silvennoinen, Jaana Pelkonen and Tommi Manninen discussed the artists and songs and together with an audience vote, determined which entry had the best music video. The guest panel selected "Love Is Blind" performed by Cristal Snow and "Sing it Away" performed by Sandhja as having the best music videos, while the audience vote was won by "Love Is Blind" performed by Cristal Snow. Between 31 January and 19 February, each competing artist held a Facebook Live session online, the content of which was up to each artist.

Artist	Song	Songwriter(s)
Annica Milán and Kimmo Blom	"Good Enough"	Jonas Gladnikoff, Matthew Ker, Michael James Down, Primož Poglajen
Attention 2	"Ready For the Show"	Henna Helasvuo, Lasse Turunen
Barbe-Q-Barbies	"Let Me Out"	Janne Saksa, Niki Westerback, Tracy Lipp
ClemSO	"Thief"	Clement Ogundipe, Gideon Aiyegunle
Cristal Snow	"Love Is Blind"	Tapio Huuska, Jimi Constantine, Samuel Kovanko
Eini	"Draamaa"	Janne Rintala
Gušani Brothers	"Poom Poom"	Irfan Gušani, Sami Gušani, Meho Gušani
Lieminen	"Pehmeiden arvojen vaalijat"	Jaakko Luomanen, Pasi Siitonen
Mikael Saari	"On It Goes"	Mikael Saari
Mikko Herranen	"Evil Tone"	Mikko Herranen
Pää-Äijät	"Shamppanjataivas"	Julmari, Jaba, Jimi, Heku, Samu
Pietarin Spektaakkeli	"Liian kuuma"	Pietari Kiviharju, Antti Hynninen
Rafaela Truda	"Rise Up"	Kalle Mäkipelto, Olli-Matti Kalliosaari, Rafaela Truda
Saara Aalto	"No Fear"	Saara Aalto
Sandhja	"Sing It Away"	Sandhja Kuivalainen, Milos Rosas, Heikki Korhonen, Petri Matara, Markus Savijoki
Stella Christine	"Ain't Got Time for Boys"	Stella Christine
Tuuli Okkonen	"Don't Wake Me Up"	Michael James Down, Primož Poglajen, Dimitri Stassos, Tuuli Okkonen, Johnny Sanchez, Sara Ljunggren
Ylona	"Blazing Fire"	Tero Kaikkonen, Jaakko Salovaara, Ilona Savolainen

==== Semi-finals ====
The three semi-final shows took place on 6, 13 and 20 February 2016. The top three from the six competing entries in each semi-final qualified to the final based on the results from the public vote. In addition to the competing entries, hosts Krista Siegfrids and Roope Salminen performed the song "Juontoharjoitukset" as the interval act in the first semi-final, while Robin performed a cover of the 1980 Finnish Eurovision entry "Huilumies" and his single "Miten eskimot suutelee?" in the second semi-final and Chisu performed a cover of the 1962 Finnish Eurovision entry "Tipi-tii" and her song "Tähdet" in the third semi-final.

Semi-final 1 – 6 February 2016
R/O	Artist	Song	Public Vote			Place
R/O	Artist	Song	Before Show	During Show	Total	Place
1	Saara Aalto	"No Fear"	35%	35%	35%	1
2	Mikko Herranen	"Evil Tone"	9%	7%	7%	6
3	Stella Christine	"Ain't Got Time for Boys"	17%	21%	21%	2
4	Eini	"Draamaa"	11%	19%	18%	3
5	ClemSO	"Thief"	12%	8%	8%	5
6	Pää-Äijät	"Shamppanjataivas"	16%	10%	11%	4

Semi-final 2 – 13 February 2016
R/O	Artist	Song	Public Vote			Place
R/O	Artist	Song	Before Show	During Show	Total	Place
1	Attention 2	"Ready For the Show"	7%	5%	5%	6
2	Cristal Snow	"Love Is Blind"	28%	21%	22%	3
3	Annica Milán and Kimmo Blom	"Good Enough"	21%	22%	22%	2
4	Rafaela Truda	"Rise Up"	8%	14%	13%	4
5	Ylona	"Blazing Fire"	10%	14%	13%	5
6	Mikael Saari	"On It Goes"	26%	24%	25%	1

Semi-final 3 – 20 February 2016
R/O	Artist	Song	Public Vote			Place
R/O	Artist	Song	Before Show	During Show	Total	Place
1	Lieminen	"Pehmeiden arvojen vaalijat"	7%	5%	5%	6
2	Tuuli Okkonen	"Don't Wake Me Up"	18%	26%	24%	2
3	Gušani Brothers	"Poom Poom"	14%	9%	10%	4
4	Barbe-Q-Barbies	"Let Me Out"	23%	24%	24%	3
5	Pietarin Spektaakkeli	"Liian kuuma"	9%	8%	9%	5
6	Sandhja	"Sing It Away"	29%	28%	28%	1

==== Final ====
The final took place on 27 February 2016 where the nine entries that qualified from the preceding three semi-finals competed. "Sing It Away" performed by Sandhja was selected as the winner by a 50/50 combination of public votes and ten jury groups that represented different sections of Finnish society: Eurovision experts, musicians, the media, social media influencers, YouTube personalities, Finland Swedes, LGBT, members of parliament, asphalt constructors, and children. The viewers and the juries each had a total of 430 points to award. Each jury group distributed their points as follows: 1, 2, 4, 6, 8, 10 and 12 points. The viewer vote was based on the percentage of votes each song achieved through the following voting methods: telephone, SMS and online voting. For example, if a song gained 10% of the viewer vote, then that entry would be awarded 10% of 430 points rounded to the nearest integer: 43 points.

In addition to the performances of the competing entries, the interval act featured Krista Siegfrids covering the first 1961 Finnish Eurovision song, "Valoa ikkunassa", 2015 Finnish Eurovision entrants Pertti Kurikan Nimipäivät and Finnish Eurovision Song Contest 2006 winners Lordi.

Final – 27 February 2016
R/O	Artist	Song	Jury	Public Vote				Total	Place
R/O	Artist	Song	Jury	Before Show	During Show	Total	Points	Total	Place
1	Cristal Snow	"Love Is Blind"	41	12%	9%	9.1%	39	80	6
2	Stella Christine	"Ain't Got Time for Boys"	19	6%	7%	6.5%	28	47	8
3	Annica Milán and Kimmo Blom	"Good Enough"	35	10%	11%	10.7%	46	81	5
4	Eini	"Draamaa"	32	4%	7%	6.7%	29	61	7
5	Barbe-Q-Barbies	"Let Me Out"	46	12%	9%	9.1%	39	85	4
6	Tuuli Okkonen	"Don't Wake Me Up"	20	4%	5%	4.9%	21	41	9
7	Sandhja	"Sing It Away"	98	16%	14%	14.4%	62	160	1
8	Saara Aalto	"No Fear"	67	11%	21%	20.2%	87	154	2
9	Mikael Saari	"On It Goes"	72	25%	17%	18.4%	79	151	3

Detailed Jury Votes
R/O	Song	Parliament	Eurovision experts	Finland Swedes	Musicians	LGBT	YouTubers	Media	Children	Bloggers	Asphalt constructors	Total score
1	"Love Is Blind"	8	2	6	2	10	4	1		8		41
2	"Ain't Got Time for Boys"	2		2	6				1	6	2	19
3	"Good Enough"		8	1			8	4	6		8	35
4	"Draamaa"	1	6		1	4	1	10	8	1		32
5	"Let Me Out"	6		8	10	6		8	2	2	4	46
6	"Don't Wake Me Up"		4			1	2	2	10		1	20
7	"Sing It Away"	12	10	10	8	12	12	12	4	12	6	98
8	"No Fear"	10	1	12	4	2	6		12	10	10	67
9	"On It Goes"	4	12	4	12	8	10	6		4	12	72

Jury Group Members
Jury	Members
Parliament	Jaana Pelkonen; Aino-Kaisa Pekonen; Kristiina Salonen; Jani Toivola
Eurovision Experts	Marko Vaittinen; Kaisa Iivonen; Anna Muurinen; Sami Luukela
Finland Swedes	Janne Grönroos; Jan Wallin; Hannes Wallin; Linda Sundell
Musicians	Hanna Pakarinen; Mikko Tamminen; Aija Puurtinen; Alina Toivanen
LGBT	Mikko Autio; Jenni Ahtiainen; Paula Noronen; Mika Tarvainen
YouTubers	Sonja Hämäläinen; Roope Lainevuo; Mika Tolvanen; Joona Puhakka
Media	Ilkka Mattila; Mari Pudas; Marcus Sjöström; Katja Ståhl
Children	Eedit Patrakka; Juuso Meklin; Oiva Hyvönen; Eeli Kuosmanen
Bloggers	Nimo Samatar; Peeta Peltola; Mikko Toiviainen; Emmi Nuorgam
Asphalt Constructors	Joel Jaalas; Pavel Pajunen; Jukka Hilmola; Iiro Aarnikoivu

=== Promotion ===
Sandhja's promotional activities in the lead up to the Eurovision Song Contest were focused mainly in Finland where she released a new single, "Love Me High", and completed interviews and performances to promote the release of her album Freedom Venture, which was released on 29 April 2016. In addition to her appearances in Finland, Sandhja took part took part in promotional activities in Tel Aviv, Israel between 11 and 13 April where she performed during the Israel Calling event held at the Ha'teatron venue.

== At Eurovision ==
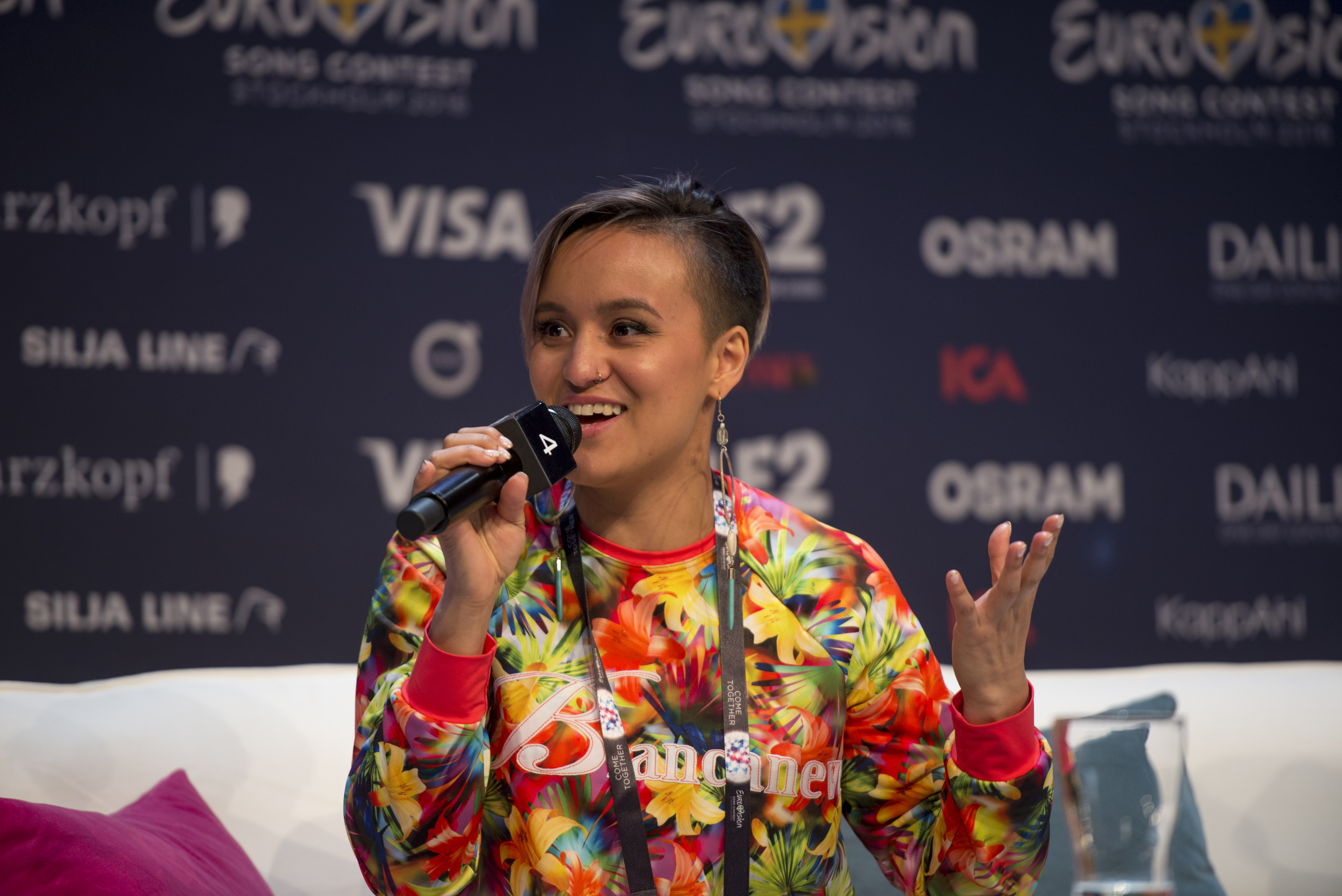
Sandhja during a press meet and greet

According to Eurovision rules, all nations with the exceptions of the host country and the "Big Five" (France, Germany, Italy, Spain and the United Kingdom) are required to qualify from one of two semi-finals in order to compete for the final; the top ten countries from each semi-final progress to the final. The European Broadcasting Union (EBU) split up the competing countries into six different pots based on voting patterns from previous contests, with countries with favourable voting histories put into the same pot. On 25 January 2016, a special allocation draw was held which placed each country into one of the two semi-finals, as well as which half of the show they would perform in. Finland was placed into the first semi-final, held on 10 May 2016, and was scheduled to perform in the first half of the show.

Once all the competing songs for the 2016 contest had been released, the running order for the semi-finals was decided by the shows' producers rather than through another draw, so that similar songs were not placed next to each other. Finland was set to open the show and perform in position 1, before the entry from Greece.

The two semi-finals and the final were televised in Finland on Yle TV2 with a second audio program providing commentary in Finnish by Mikko Silvennoinen and in Swedish by Eva Frantz and Johan Lindroos; the shows also aired on TV Finland. The three shows were broadcast via radio with Finnish commentary by Sanna Pirkkalainen and Jorma Hietamäki on Yle Radio Suomi and with Swedish commentary by Eva Frantz and Johan Lindroos on Yle Vega. The Finnish spokesperson, who announced the top 12-point score awarded by the Finnish jury during the final, was Jussi-Pekka Rantan.

=== Semi-final ===
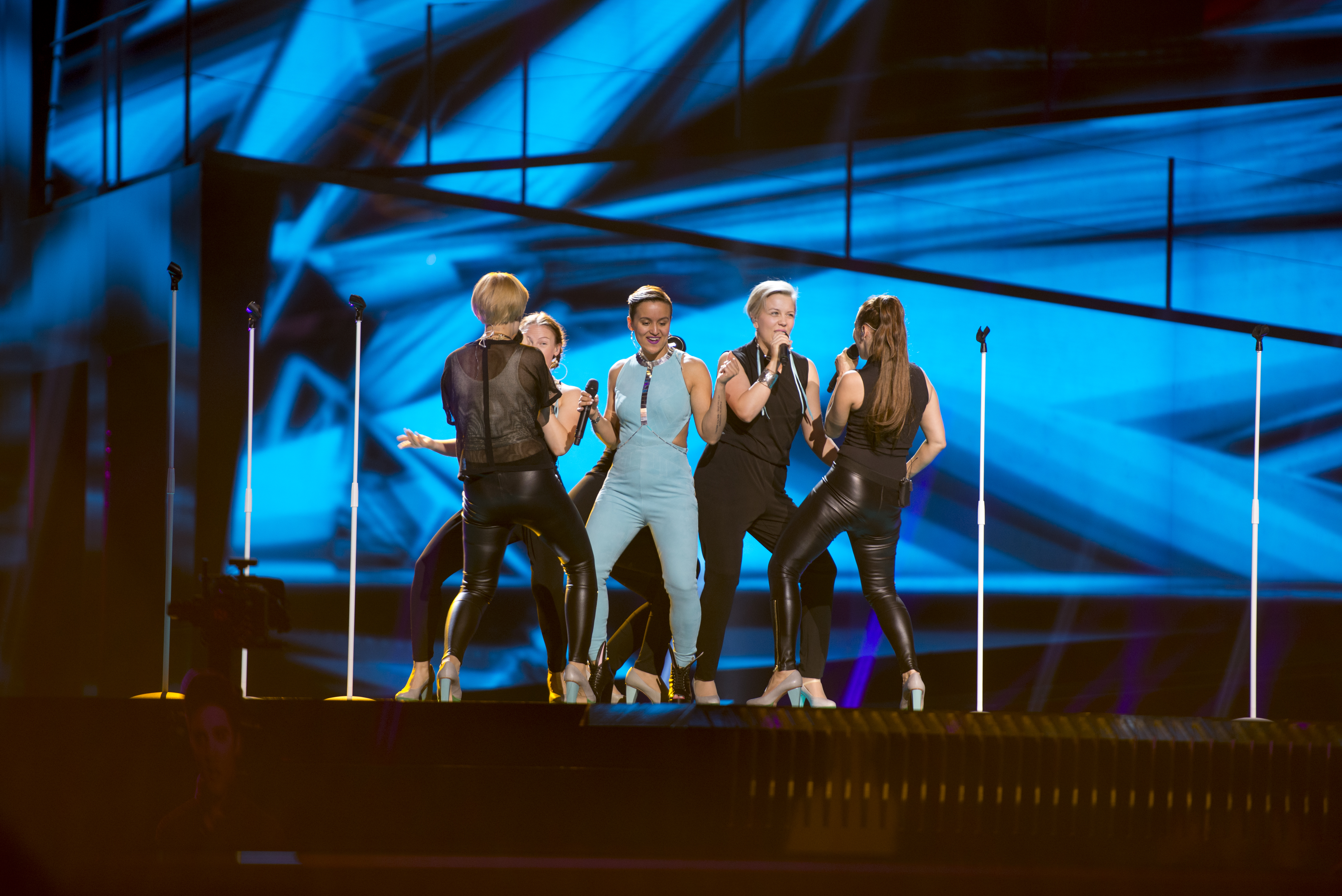
Sandhja during a rehearsal before the first semi-final

Sandhja took part in technical rehearsals on 2 and 6 May, followed by dress rehearsals on 9 and 10 May. This included the jury show on 9 May where the professional juries of each country watched and voted on the competing entries.

The Finnish performance featured Sandhja performing in a blue jumpsuit joined by five backing vocalists wearing black outfits. Sandhja and the backing vocalists performed a dance routine together that revolved around the microphone stands and made use of the catwalk and satellite stage. The LED screens displayed blue and purple designs with a liquid effect. The five backing vocalists that joined Sandhja on stage were Heini Ikonen, Reetta Korhonen, Jepa Lambert, Tuuli Ikonen and Linda Ilves.

At the end of the show, Finland was not announced among the top 10 entries in the first semi-final and therefore failed to qualify to compete in the final. It was later revealed that Finland placed fifteenth in the semi-final, receiving a total of 51 points: 16 points from the televoting and 35 points from the juries.

=== Voting ===
Voting during the three shows was conducted under a new system that involved each country now awarding two sets of points from 1-8, 10 and 12: one from their professional jury and the other from televoting. Each nation's jury consisted of five music industry professionals who are citizens of the country they represent, with their names published before the contest to ensure transparency. This jury judged each entry based on: vocal capacity; the stage performance; the song's composition and originality; and the overall impression by the act. In addition, no member of a national jury was permitted to be related in any way to any of the competing acts in such a way that they cannot vote impartially and independently. The individual rankings of each jury member as well as the nation's televoting results were released shortly after the grand final.

Below is a breakdown of points awarded to Finland and awarded by Finland in the first semi-final and grand final of the contest, and the breakdown of the jury voting and televoting conducted during the two shows:

==== Points awarded to Finland ====
Points awarded to Finland (Semi-final 1)
Score	Televote	Jury
12 points		
10 points		
8 points		Armenia
7 points	Estonia	Czech Republic
6 points	Sweden	
5 points		Malta
4 points		Hungary; Sweden
3 points		Spain
2 points	Iceland	Austria; Netherlands
1 point	Hungary	

==== Points awarded by Finland ====
Points awarded by Finland (Semi-final 1)
Score	Televote	Jury
12 points	Estonia	Netherlands
10 points	Austria	Czech Republic
8 points	Russia	Malta
7 points	Cyprus	Armenia
6 points	Netherlands	Russia
5 points	Iceland	Croatia
4 points	Hungary	Iceland
3 points	San Marino	Austria
2 points	Croatia	Azerbaijan
1 point	Armenia	Estonia

Points awarded by Finland (Final)
Score	Televote	Jury
12 points	Ukraine	Sweden
10 points	Sweden	Netherlands
8 points	Russia	Australia
7 points	Australia	Israel
6 points	Austria	Lithuania
5 points	Poland	Malta
4 points	Bulgaria	Austria
3 points	France	Czech Republic
2 points	Latvia	Italy
1 point	Cyprus	France

==== Detailed voting results ====
The following members will comprise the Finnish jury:

- Jurek Reunamäki (Jurek; jury chairperson) – music producer
- Hanna Kinnunen – radio host and producer
- Heimo Hatakka – lyricist, journalist
- Jori Sjöroos – producer, composer, lyricist
- Jannika Bergroth (Jannika B) – singer, songwriter

Detailed voting results from Finland (Semi-final 1)
R/O	Country	Jury							Televote	
R/O	Country	Jurek	H. Kinnunen	H. Hatakka	J. Sjöroos	Jannika B	Rank	Points	Rank	Points
01	Finland									
02	Greece	16	17	17	15	17	17		16	
03	Moldova	8	16	15	14	9	14		17	
04	Hungary	7	15	14	12	6	12		7	4
05	Croatia	5	4	10	7	10	6	5	9	2
06	Netherlands	1	1	7	5	1	1	12	5	6
07	Armenia	6	3	6	8	7	4	7	10	1
08	San Marino	15	12	11	2	12	11		8	3
09	Russia	10	5	2	11	2	5	6	3	8
10	Czech Republic	3	2	5	6	3	2	10	11	
11	Cyprus	11	13	9	13	13	13		4	7
12	Austria	2	6	13	1	15	8	3	2	10
13	Estonia	12	8	12	4	11	10	1	1	12
14	Azerbaijan	9	9	4	10	5	9	2	15	
15	Montenegro	17	11	16	16	14	16		14	
16	Iceland	13	7	3	9	4	7	4	6	5
17	Bosnia and Herzegovina	14	14	8	17	16	15		12	
18	Malta	4	10	1	3	8	3	8	13	

Detailed voting results from Finland (Final)
R/O	Country	Jury							Televote	
R/O	Country	Jurek	H. Kinnunen	H. Hatakka	J. Sjöroos	Jannika B	Rank	Points	Rank	Points
01	Belgium	18	22	14	19	17	22		17	
02	Czech Republic	14	6	7	16	7	8	3	22	
03	Netherlands	4	2	8	7	8	2	10	13	
04	Azerbaijan	23	25	16	21	19	23		24	
05	Hungary	21	23	21	25	20	25		12	
06	Italy	16	11	10	3	12	9	2	16	
07	Israel	12	7	12	4	1	4	7	14	
08	Bulgaria	9	17	17	9	22	15		7	4
09	Sweden	2	1	3	1	6	1	12	2	10
10	Germany	13	19	24	10	14	19		25	
11	France	17	20	4	11	3	10	1	8	3
12	Poland	10	21	11	22	21	20		6	5
13	Australia	3	3	15	8	4	3	8	4	7
14	Cyprus	24	26	25	24	26	26		10	1
15	Serbia	22	24	13	26	24	24		26	
16	Lithuania	5	14	2	17	2	5	6	11	
17	Croatia	11	15	23	20	10	18		20	
18	Russia	26	10	6	18	11	14		3	8
19	Spain	19	12	1	12	23	12		15	
20	Latvia	7	16	26	14	5	13		9	2
21	Ukraine	8	5	22	6	15	11		1	12
22	Malta	6	8	5	5	18	6	5	23	
23	Georgia	25	18	9	13	25	21		19	
24	Austria	1	4	20	2	16	7	4	5	6
25	United Kingdom	20	9	19	15	13	16		21	
26	Armenia	15	13	18	23	9	17		18	
