= Finland in the Eurovision Song Contest 2015 =

- Eurovision Song Contest 2015
- Participating broadcaster: Yleisradio (Yle)
- Country: Finland
- Selection process: Uuden Musiikin Kilpailu 2015
- Selection date: 28 February 2015

Competing entry
- Song: "Aina mun pitää"
- Artist: Pertti Kurikan Nimipäivät
- Songwriters: Pertti Kurikan Nimipäivät

Placement
- Semi-final result: Failed to qualify (16th)

Participation chronology

Finland was represented at the Eurovision Song Contest 2015 with the song "Aina mun pitää" written and performed by the band Pertti Kurikan Nimipäivät. The Finnish participating broadcaster, Yleisradio (Yle), organised the national final Uuden Musiikin Kilpailu 2015 in order to select its entry for the contest. 18 entries were selected to compete in the national final, which consisted of three semi-finals and a final, taking place in February 2015. Six entries competed in each semi-final and the top three from each semi-final, as selected solely by a public vote, advanced to the final. Nine entries competed in the final on 28 February where the combination of votes from eight jury groups representing different factions of Finnish society and votes from the public selected "Aina mun pitää" performed by Pertti Kurikan Nimipäivät as the winner.

Finland was drawn to compete in the first semi-final of the Eurovision Song Contest which took place on 19 May 2015. Performing during the show in position 5, "Aina mun pitää" was not announced among the top 10 entries of the first semi-final and therefore did not qualify to compete in the final. It was later revealed that Finland placed sixteenth (last) out of the 16 participating countries in the semi-final with 13 points.

== Background ==
Prior to the 2015 contest, Yleisradio (Yle) had participated in the Eurovision Song Contest representing Finland forty-eight times since its first entry in 1961. It has won the contest once in 2006 with the song "Hard Rock Hallelujah" performed by Lordi. In 2014, "Something Better" performed by Softengine managed to qualify Finland to the final and placed eleventh.

As part of its duties as participating broadcaster, Yle organises the selection of its entry in the Eurovision Song Contest and broadcasts the event in the country. The broadcaster confirmed their intentions to participate at the 2015 contest on 26 May 2014. Yle had selected its entries for the contest through national final competitions that have varied in format over the years. Between 1961 and 2011, a selection show that was often titled Euroviisukarsinta highlighted that the purpose of the program was to select a song for Eurovision. However, since 2012, the broadcaster has organised the selection show Uuden Musiikin Kilpailu (UMK), which focuses on showcasing new music with the winning song being selected as the Finnish Contest entry for that year. Along with its participation confirmation, the broadcaster also announced that its entry for the 2015 contest would be selected through Uuden Musiikin Kilpailu 2015.

== Before Eurovision ==
=== Uuden Musiikin Kilpailu 2015 ===
Uuden Musiikin Kilpailu 2015 was the fourth edition of Uuden Musiikin Kilpailu (UMK), the music competition that selects Finland's entries for the Eurovision Song Contest. The competition consisted of four shows that commenced with the first of three semi-finals on 7 February 2015 and conclude with a final on 28 February 2015. The four shows were held at the YLE Studios in Helsinki and hosted by Rakel Liekki and Roope Salminen. All shows were broadcast on Yle TV2 and online at yle.fi/umk. The final was also broadcast online at the official Eurovision Song Contest website eurovision.tv as well as via radio on Yle Radio Suomi and with commentary in Swedish on Yle X3M.

==== Format ====
The format of the competition consisted of four shows: three semi-finals and a final. Six songs competed in each semi-final and the top three entries from each semi-final qualified to complete the nine-song lineup in the final. The results for the semi-finals were determined exclusively by a public vote, while the results in the final were determined by the combination of public voting and jury voting. Public voting included the options of telephone, SMS and online voting. The proceeds from the public voting were donated to the Nose Day Foundation (Nenäpäivä-säätiö), which funds projects in developing nations.

==== Competing entries ====
A submission period was opened by Yle which lasted between 1 September 2014 and 8 September 2014. The competition allowed entries longer than three minutes to compete, however, should the winning song be longer than three minutes, it would have to be shortened for the Eurovision Song Contest. At least one of the writers and the lead singer(s) had to hold Finnish citizenship or live in Finland permanently in order for the entry to qualify to compete. A panel of experts appointed by Yle selected eighteen entries for the competition from the received submissions. The competing entries were to be presented during a live streamed press conference on 13 January 2015, however the entries were leaked on Spotify on 7 January 2015. The competing entries were also presented in a televised preview programme on 31 January 2015, hosted by Aino Töllinen, where a panel of guests consisting of Cristal Snow, Hanna-Riikka Siitonen, Toni Wirtanen and Regina Iisa discussed the artists and songs and determined which entry had the best music video. The guest panel selected "Ostarilla" performed by Shava as having the best entry.

Artist	Song	Songwriter(s)
Aikuinen	"Kyynelten lahti"	Arde, Aikuinen
Angelo De Nile	"All for Victory"	Tuomas Heikkinen, Kimmo Blom, Mikko Salovaara, Torsti Spoof
Eeverest	"Love It All Away"	Marcus Tikkanen, Niko Mansikka-Aho
Hans on the Bass	"Loveshine"	Klaus Suhonen
Heidi Pakarinen	"Bon voyage"	Simo Koho, Maria Söder
Ida Bois	"Kumbaya"	Ida Bois
Järjestyshäiriö	"Särkyneiden sydänten kulmilla"	Juho Markkanen, Mikko Manninen
Jouni Aslak	"Lions and Lambs"	Jouni Aslak Raatikainen
Norlan "El Misionario"	"No voy a llorar por ti"	Oldrich Gonzaléz, Norlan Leygonier Santana
Opera Skaala	"Heart of Light"	Visa Oscar, Essi Luttinen, Janne Lehmusvuo
Otto Ivar	"Truth or Dare"	Otto Iivari
Pertti Kurikan Nimipäivät	"Aina mun pitää"	Pertti Kurikan Nimipäivät
Pihka ja Myrsky	"Sydän ei nuku"	Lasse Turunen, Laura Madekivi
Satin Circus	"Crossroads"	J.M.A, Patric Sarin, Olli Halonen, Paul Uotila, Axel Kalland, Kristian Westerling, Julia Fabrin
Shava	"Ostarilla"	Kiureli Sammallahti
Siru	"Mustelmat"	Ilkka Wirtanen, Kari Haapala, Siru Airistola
Solju	"Hold Your Colours"	Ylva Persson, Linda Persson, Ulla Pirttijärvi-Länsman
Vilikasper Kanth	"Äänen kantamattomiin"	Vilikasper Kanth, Vesa Lappalainen, Jari Kanth

==== Semi-finals ====
The three semi-final shows took place on 7, 14 and 21 February 2015. The top three from the six competing entries in each semi-final qualified to the final based on the results from the public vote. In addition to the performances of the competing entries, host Roope Salminen together with Koirat performed the song "Biisonit" as the interval act in the first semi-final, while 1987 Finnish Eurovision entrant Vicky Rosti, 2002 Finnish Eurovision entrant Laura Voutilainen and 2013 Finnish Eurovision entrant Krista Siegfrids performed a cover of the 1982 Finnish Eurovision entry "Nuku Pommiin" in the second semi-final and Antti Tuisku performed his single "Peto on irti" and a cover of the 2006 Finnish winning Eurovision entry "Hard Rock Hallelujah" in the third semi-final.

Semi-final 1 – 7 February 2015
R/O	Artist	Song	Result
1	Satin Circus	"Crossroads"	Advanced
2	Hans on the Bass	"Loveshine"	—N/a
3	Vilikasper Kanth	"Äänen kantamattomiin"	—N/a
4	Pihka ja Myrsky	"Sydän ei nuku"	—N/a
5	Norlan "El Misionario"	"No voy a llorar por ti"	Advanced
6	Pertti Kurikan Nimipäivät	"Aina mun pitää"	Advanced

Semi-final 2 – 14 February 2015
R/O	Artist	Song	Result
1	Siru	"Mustelmat"	—N/a
2	Shava	"Ostarilla"	Advanced
3	Otto Ivar	"Truth or Dare"	—N/a
4	Eeverest	"Love It All Away"	—N/a
5	Opera Skaala	"Heart of Light"	Advanced
6	Jouni Aslak	"Lions and Lambs"	Advanced

Semi-final 3 – 21 February 2015
R/O	Artist	Song	Result
1	Solju	"Hold Your Colours"	Advanced
2	Aikuinen	"Kyynelten lahti"	—N/a
3	Ida Bois	"Kumbaya"	—N/a
4	Järjestyshäiriö	"Särkyneiden sydänten kulmilla"	Advanced
5	Angelo de Nile	"All for Victory"	Advanced
6	Heidi Pakarinen	"Bon voyage"	—N/a

==== Final ====
The final took place on 28 February 2015 where the nine entries that qualified from the preceding three semi-finals competed. "Aina mun pitää" performed by Pertti Kurikan Nimipäivät was selected as the winner by a combination of public votes (90%) and eight jury groups that represented different sections of Finnish society: Marthas, LGBT, children, Finland Swedes, musicians, the media, Eurovision fans of voluntary UMK viewers and taxi drivers (10%). Each jury group distributed their points as follows: 1, 2, 4, 6, 8, 10 and 12 points, while the viewer vote was based on the percentage of votes each song achieved through the following voting methods: telephone, SMS and online voting. In addition to the performances of the competing entries, the interval act featured Emma Salokoski and 2014 Finnish Eurovision entrants Softengine.

Final – 28 February 2015
R/O	Artist	Song	Jury	Televote	Total	Place
1	Shava	"Ostarilla"	1.2%	2.2%	3.4%	8
2	Satin Circus	"Crossroads"	2.1%	24.2%	26.3%	2
3	Solju	"Hold Your Colours"	0.7%	5.8%	6.5%	4
4	Järjestyshäiriö	"Särkyneiden sydänten kulmilla"	0.9%	2.4%	3.3%	9
5	Norlan "El Misionario"	"No voy a llorar por ti"	0.4%	3.7%	4.1%	7
6	Opera Skaala	"Heart of Light"	1.6%	6.7%	8.3%	3
7	Jouni Aslak	"Lions & Lambs"	1.1%	3.3%	4.4%	6
8	Pertti Kurikan Nimipäivät	"Aina mun pitää"	1.2%	36.2%	37.4%	1
9	Angelo De Nile	"All For Victory"	0.8%	5.5%	6.3%	5

Detailed Jury Votes
R/O	Song	Marthas	LGBT	Children	Finland Swedes	Musicians	Media	Eurovision fans	Taxi drivers	Total score	Percentage
1	"Ostarilla"	1	8	10	8	6	2	6		41	1.2%
2	"Crossroads"	6	6	12	12	1	12	12	12	73	2.1%
3	"Hold Your Colours"	12	1	6		2	4			25	0.7%
4	"Särkyneiden sydänten kulmilla"	2	4		6		8	4	8	32	0.9%
5	"No voy a llorar por ti"	4		1	1	4		2	1	13	0.4%
6	"Heart of Light"		10	2		12	10	10	10	54	1.6%
7	"Lions & Lambs"		2	8	10		6	8	4	38	1.1%
8	"Aina mun pitää"	8	12		4	10	1		6	41	1.2%
9	"All For Victory"	10		4	2	8		1	2	27	0.8%

Jury Group Members
Jury	Members
Marthas	Marjukka Erpilä; Riitta Poikajärvi; Elina Hattunen; Kirsti Aarnio
LGBT	Mikko Silvennoinen; Laura Haimila; Jukka Kuronen; Alina Toivanen
Children	Iina Virtanen; Ilari Virtanen; Lumi Kurri; Leimu Leisti
Finland Swedes	Janne Grönroos; Fredrika Lindholm; Martina Rustén; Hans-Erik Kotkamaa
Musicians	Maija Vilkkumaa; Sinikka Svärd; Matti Mikkola; Heikki Salo
Media	Paula Noronen; Antti Aro; Sami Luukela; Veronica Verho
Eurovision fans	Minja Nätti; Mikko Ahola; Katariina Kähkönen; Jonne Heikkinen
Taxi Drivers	Jukka Kuusisto; Anssi Roitto; Timo Hietarinne; Cindy Schmidt

=== Preparation ===
"Aina mun pitää" set a Eurovision record by being the shortest Eurovision song to ever compete at the contest with its 85-second length. Following their Finnish national final win, the band garnered media interest from international press commenting on the fact that the band was composed of middle-aged men with developmental disabilities. The band's manager, Teuvo Merkkiniemi, stated: "They try to change the world by their songs and playing: they are an example to other people with handicaps."

== At Eurovision ==
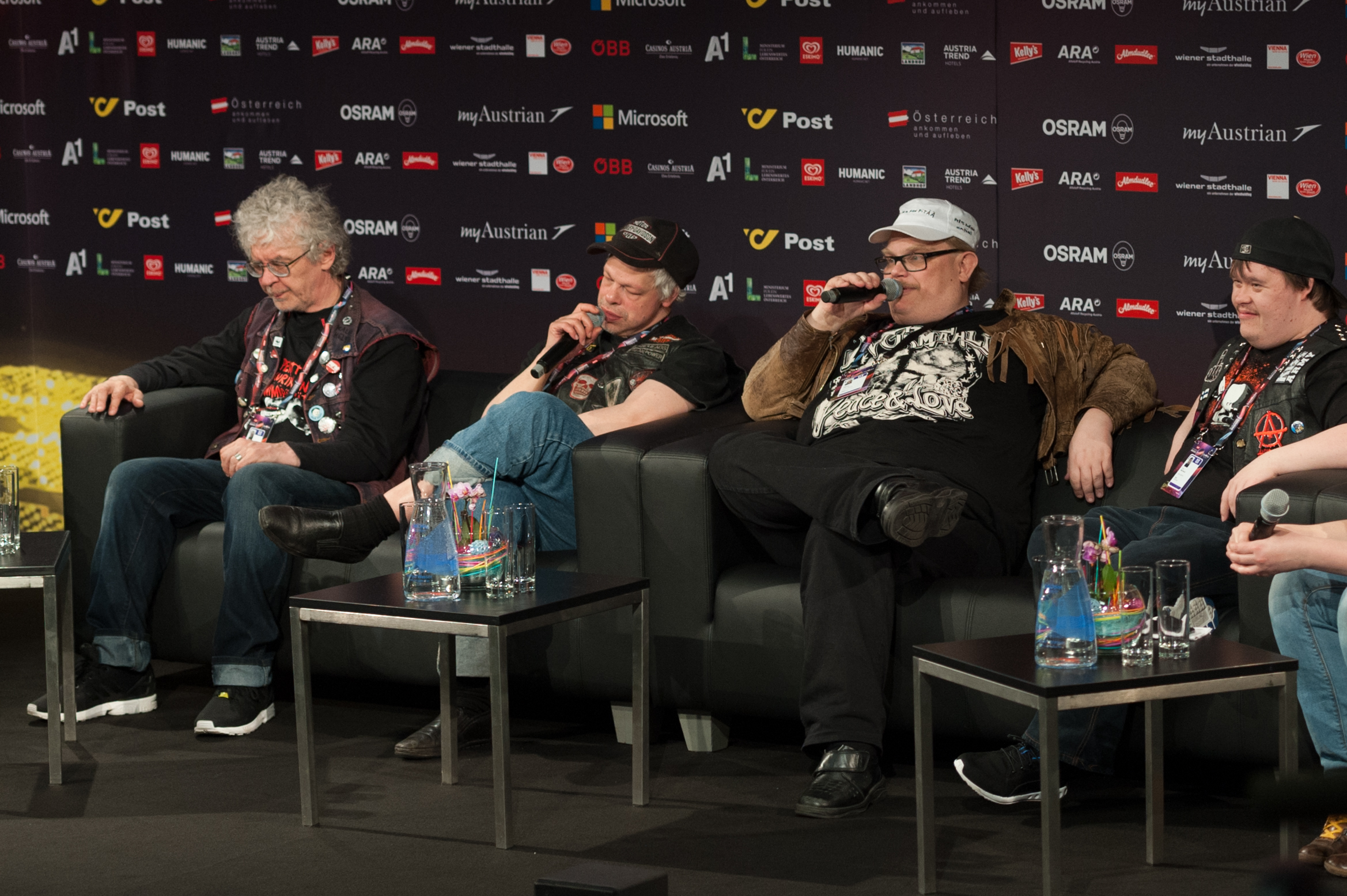
Pertti Kurikan Nimipäivät during a press meet and greet

According to Eurovision rules, all nations with the exceptions of the host country and the "Big Five" (France, Germany, Italy, Spain and the United Kingdom) are required to qualify from one of two semi-finals in order to compete for the final; the top ten countries from each semi-final progress to the final. In the 2015 contest, Australia also competed directly in the final as an invited guest nation. The European Broadcasting Union (EBU) split up the competing countries into five different pots based on voting patterns from previous contests, with countries with favourable voting histories put into the same pot. On 26 January 2015, a special allocation draw was held which placed each country into one of the two semi-finals, as well as which half of the show they would perform in. Finland was placed into the first semi-final, to be held on 19 May 2015, and was scheduled to perform in the first half of the show.

Once all the competing songs for the 2015 contest had been released, the running order for the semi-finals was decided by the shows' producers rather than through another draw, so that similar songs were not placed next to each other. Finland was set to perform in position 5, following the entry from the Netherlands and before the entry from Greece.

The two semi-finals and the final were televised in Finland on Yle TV2 and Yle Radio Suomi with a second audio program providing commentary in Finnish by Aino Töllinen and Cristal Snow and in Swedish by Eva Frantz and Johan Lindroos also on Yle Radio Vega. The Finnish spokesperson, who announced the Finnish votes during the final, was 2013 Finnish Eurovision entrant Krista Siegfrids.

=== Semi-final ===
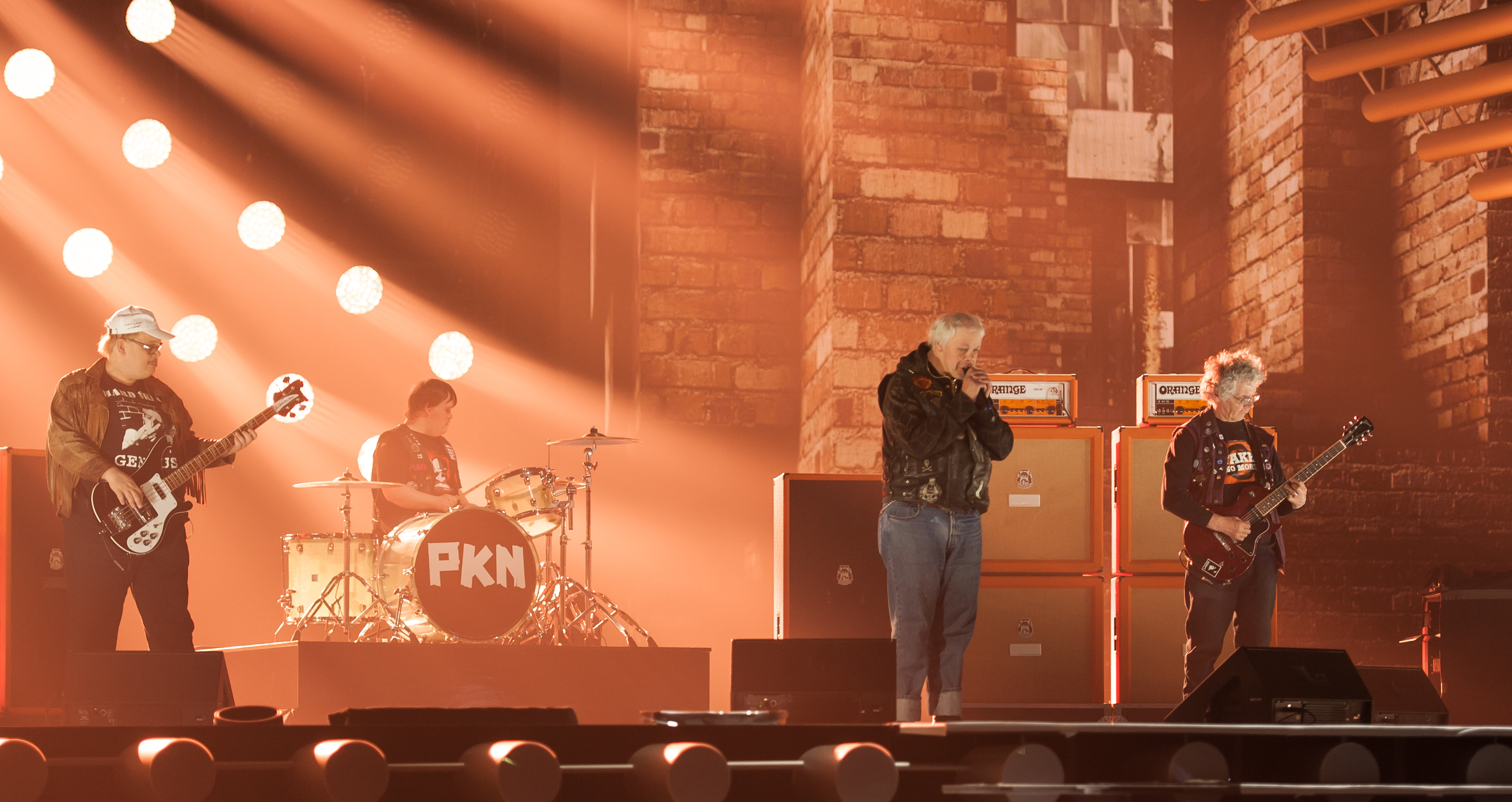
Pertti Kurikan Nimipäivät during a rehearsal before the first semi-final

Pertti Kurikan Nimipäivät took part in technical rehearsals on 11 and 15 May, followed by dress rehearsals on 18 and 19 May. This included the jury show on 18 May where the professional juries of each country watched and voted on the competing entries.

The Finnish performance featured the members of Pertti Kurikan Nimipäivät dressed in punk outfits and performing in a band set-up. The stage lighting transitioned between white and golden yellow and the LED screens displayed industrial brick walls. Sound equipment were scattered around the stage and the performance also featured smoke effects.

At the end of the show, Finland was not announced among the top 10 entries in the first semi-final and therefore failed to qualify to compete in the final. It was later revealed that Finland placed sixteenth (last) in the semi-final, receiving a total of 13 points.

=== Voting ===
Voting during the three shows consisted of 50 percent public televoting and 50 percent from a jury deliberation. The jury consisted of five music industry professionals who were citizens of the country they represent, with their names published before the contest to ensure transparency. This jury was asked to judge each contestant based on: vocal capacity; the stage performance; the song's composition and originality; and the overall impression by the act. In addition, no member of a national jury could be related in any way to any of the competing acts in such a way that they cannot vote impartially and independently. The individual rankings of each jury member were released shortly after the grand final.

Following the release of the full split voting by the EBU after the conclusion of the competition, it was revealed that Finland had placed tenth with the public televote and sixteenth (last) with the jury vote in the first semi-final. In the public vote, Finland scored 51 points, while with the jury vote, Finland scored 1 point.

Below is a breakdown of points awarded to Finland and awarded by Finland in the first semi-final and grand final of the contest, and the breakdown of the jury voting and televoting conducted during the two shows:

==== Points awarded to Finland ====
Points awarded to Finland (Semi-final 1)
Score	Country
12 points	
10 points	
8 points	
7 points	
6 points	
5 points	
4 points	Estonia; Serbia
3 points	
2 points	Denmark; Hungary
1 point	Belarus

==== Points awarded by Finland ====
Points awarded by Finland (Semi-final 1)
Score	Country
12 points	Belgium
10 points	Russia
8 points	Estonia
7 points	Hungary
6 points	Romania
5 points	Georgia
4 points	Serbia
3 points	Netherlands
2 points	Greece
1 point	Denmark

Points awarded by Finland (Final)
Score	Country
12 points	Sweden
10 points	Estonia
8 points	Russia
7 points	Belgium
6 points	Latvia
5 points	Australia
4 points	Norway
3 points	Israel
2 points	Italy
1 point	Slovenia

==== Detailed voting results ====
The following members comprised the Finnish jury:

- Aija Puurtinen (jury chairperson) – singer, musician
- Laura Haimila – morning show host
- Mikko Pykäri – composer
- Pekka Eronen (Aikuinen) – songwriter/lyricist, film critic
- Jukka Immonen – producer, composer

Detailed voting results from Finland (Semi-final 1)
R/O	Country	A. Puurtinen	L. Haimila	M. Pykäri	Aikuinen	J. Immonen	Jury Rank	Televote Rank	Combined Rank	Points
01	Moldova	5	14	12	8	13	12	12	12	
02	Armenia	15	15	15	3	15	15	15	15	
03	Belgium	1	4	2	2	3	1	2	1	12
04	Netherlands	9	9	5	6	2	4	11	8	3
05	Finland									
06	Greece	4	3	7	9	9	7	10	9	2
07	Estonia	10	11	6	1	4	5	1	3	8
08	Macedonia	14	10	11	14	10	14	14	14	
09	Serbia	8	6	9	12	14	10	5	7	4
10	Hungary	7	7	8	4	5	3	7	4	7
11	Belarus	13	5	13	13	11	13	13	13	
12	Russia	2	1	1	11	1	2	3	2	10
13	Denmark	12	12	4	7	8	9	9	10	1
14	Albania	6	8	10	15	12	11	8	11	
15	Romania	3	13	14	5	7	8	4	5	6
16	Georgia	11	2	3	10	6	6	6	6	5

Detailed voting results from Finland (Final)
R/O	Country	A. Puurtinen	L. Haimila	M. Pykäri	Aikuinen	J. Immonen	Jury Rank	Televote Rank	Combined Rank	Points
01	Slovenia	17	15	8	8	18	12	11	10	1
02	France	22	14	11	7	15	13	20	14	
03	Israel	10	9	16	10	17	10	10	8	3
04	Estonia	4	13	4	2	8	5	1	2	10
05	United Kingdom	27	19	10	22	19	22	17	23	
06	Armenia	25	27	27	18	27	27	27	27	
07	Lithuania	16	26	14	16	11	17	21	21	
08	Serbia	14	10	18	25	26	21	16	19	
09	Norway	7	21	9	4	9	9	7	7	4
10	Sweden	2	2	1	5	3	2	2	1	12
11	Cyprus	15	23	15	6	5	11	22	15	
12	Australia	8	11	12	11	4	6	6	6	5
13	Belgium	3	3	3	1	6	3	5	4	7
14	Austria	26	20	17	13	25	23	23	25	
15	Greece	9	6	19	23	21	14	24	22	
16	Montenegro	23	25	26	21	20	25	9	16	
17	Germany	11	7	7	15	7	7	19	12	
18	Poland	24	12	13	9	22	16	25	24	
19	Latvia	1	1	6	3	2	1	8	5	6
20	Romania	18	22	25	14	24	24	13	18	
21	Spain	12	8	20	24	16	15	14	13	
22	Hungary	20	16	21	17	10	18	18	17	
23	Georgia	6	5	5	20	13	8	15	11	
24	Azerbaijan	13	18	22	26	12	20	26	26	
25	Russia	5	4	2	19	1	4	4	3	8
26	Albania	21	24	24	27	23	26	12	20	
27	Italy	19	17	23	12	14	19	3	9	2
