= Shava =

Shava may refer to:

- Shava, a king in Hindu mythology, regarded as the founder of Shravasti
- Sceafa, king in English mythology
- Shava (band), Finnish Bhangra band that released its first album in 2010
- "Say Shava Shava", a song from the 2001 Indian film Kabhi Khushi Kabhie Gham
- Andrei Arshavin (born 1981), Russian football player
