= Satin Circus =

Finnish pop band

- Origin: Helsinki, Finland
- Genres: Pop, pop rock
- Years active: 2010–2018
- Label: Sony Music
- Members: Kristian Westerling; Axel Kalland; Paul Uotila; Olli Halonen

Satin Circus was a Finnish pop band founded in 2010. The group was born out of the desire of four friends to play positive and energetic pop music together. The band released their first studio album, Expectations, on February 14, 2014. The band took part in Uuden Musiikin Kilpailu 2015, the Finnish selection for Eurovision Song Contest 2015 with the song "Crossroads". The band finished second, losing only to Pertti Kurikan Nimipäivät.

== Members ==
- Kristian Westerling – Lead vocals, guitar
- Axel Kalland – Keyboards, saxophone, backing vocals
- Paul Uotila – Lead vocals from 2015, Bass
- Olli Halonen – Drums, backing vocals

== Discography ==
Year	Album	Peak positions	Certification
Year	Album	FIN	Certification
2014	Expectations	12	

=== Singles ===
- "EMMA" (2013)
- "If You Love Me" (2014)
- "Crossroads" (2015)
- "Come back" (2015)
