= We Created the World =

2014 studio album by Softengine

Studio album by Softengine
- Released: 3 October 2014
- Recorded: 2013/14
- Genre: Alternative rock; indie pop
- Label: Sony Music Entertainment

Singles from We Created the World
- 1. "Something Better" Released: 21 March 2014; 2. "Yellow House" Released: 13 June 2014; 3. "The Sirens" Released: 3 October 2014; 4. "What If I?" Released: 17 December 2014

We Created the World is the debut studio album by Finnish alternative rock band Softengine. It was released in Finland on 3 October 2014, through Sony Music Entertainment. The album has peaked to number 7 on the Finnish Albums Chart. The album includes the singles "Something Better", "Yellow House", "The Sirens" and "What If I?".

== Singles ==
"Something Better" was released as the lead single from the album on 21 March 2014. The song was selected to represent Finland at the Eurovision Song Contest 2014 at the B&W Hallerne in Copenhagen, Denmark. The song qualified from the second semi-final to compete in the final. Finland placed 11th in the final, scoring 72 points. This was Finland's best placing in the contest since Lordi's victory in the Eurovision Song Contest 2006. "Yellow House" was released as the second single from the album on 13 June 2014. "The Sirens" was released as the third single from the album on 3 October 2014. "What If I?" was released as the fourth single from the album on 17 December 2014.

== Track listing ==
Standard listing
No.	Title	Writer(s)	Length
1.	"Our New Age"		1:28
2.	"Broken Reflection"		2:54
3.	"Yellow House"		3:36
4.	"Phone Call from Unknown"		3:29
5.	"The Sirens"		4:05
6.	"What If I?"		3:59
7.	"Narcissus"		3:12
8.	"Something Better"	Topi Latukka; Henri Oskár	3:03
9.	"In Disarray"		3:27
10.	"Circle"		3:41
11.	"Our Life, Our Love"		5:23

== Chart performance ==
Chart (2014/15)	Peak position
Finnish Albums (Suomen virallinen lista)	7

== Release history ==
Region	Release date	Format	Label
Finland	3 October 2014	Digital Download, CD	Sony Music Entertainment
