= The Punk Syndrome =

- Theatrical release poster
- Kovasikajuttu
- Directed by: Jukka Kärkkäinen, J-P Passi
- Written by: Jukka Kärkkäinen, J-P Passi, Sami Jahnukainen
- Produced by: Sami Jahnukainen/Mouka Filmi
- Starring: Pertti Kurikka; Kari Aalto; Sami Helle; Toni Välitalo
- Cinematography: J-P Passi
- Edited by: Riitta Poikselkä
- Distributed by: Buena Vista International
- Release date: 21 April 2012
- Running time: 85 minutes
- Country: Finland
- Language: Finnish

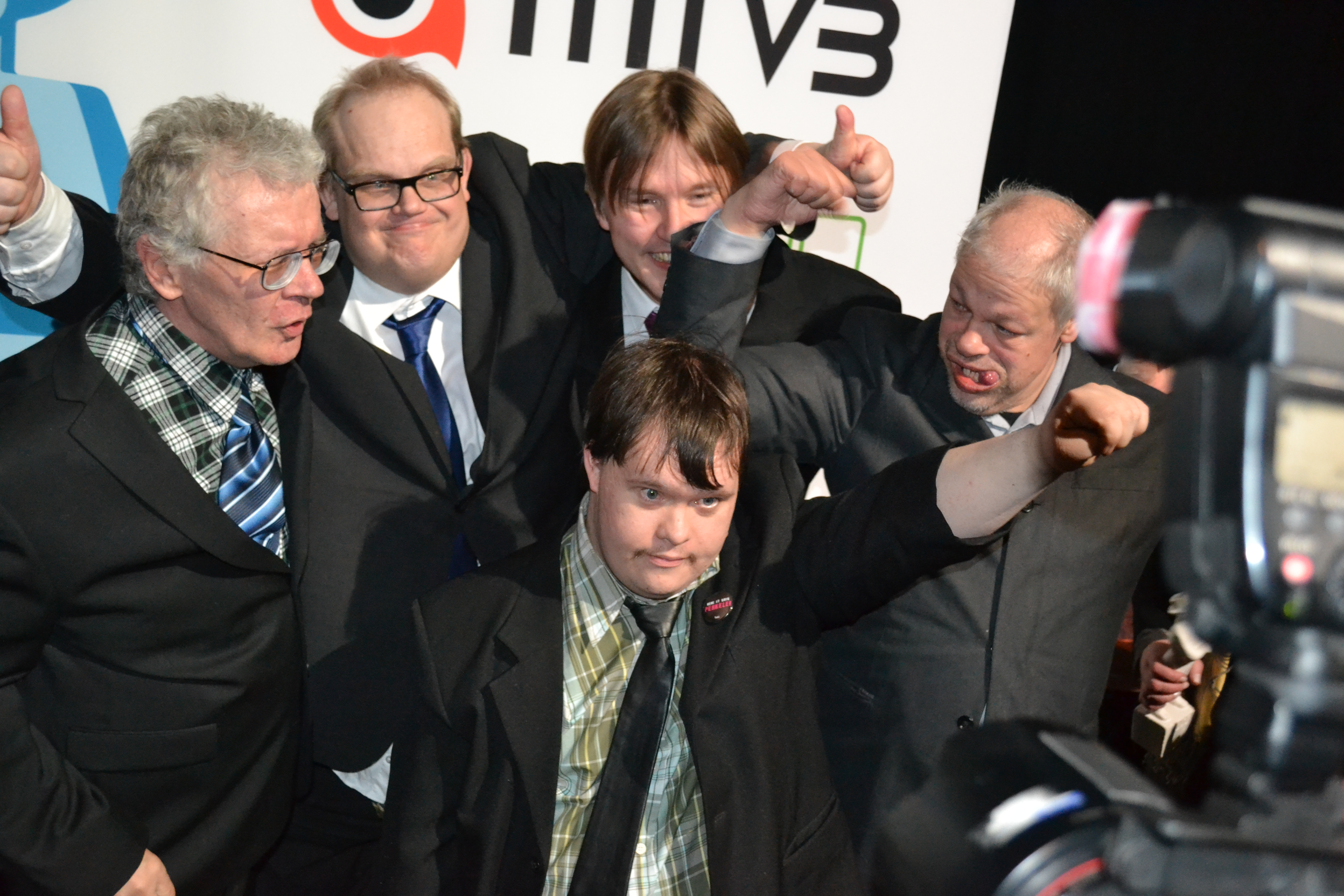
The band members celebrate the film winning the Jussi Award for the best documentary in 2013.

The Punk Syndrome (Finnish: Kovasikajuttu) is a 2012 Finnish documentary film about the punk rock band Pertti Kurikan Nimipäivät, whose members all are developmentally disabled. Directed by Jukka Kärkkäinen and J-P Passi, the film was pitched at Sheffield Doc/Fest's 2010 MeetMarket prior to completion, and premiered in cinemas in Finland on 4 May 2012.

== Synopsis ==
The Punk Syndrome follows a Finnish punk rock band whose members are living with autism and/or Down syndrome. The film employs a cinéma vérité style, meaning it doesn't provide a commentary or explanatory captions to what is seen on screen. The film shows the band members using punk music as an outlet to their frustration with everyday things, such as living in a group home, not being served coffee because of their disability and so on. The film has been said to open a window to the world of the disabled. During the film the band rises from total obscurity to become a small phenomenon and they also get to travel outside Finland. The movie has an upbeat tone and it has been compared to another band documentary Anvil! The Story of Anvil.

== Awards ==
In Finland, The Punk Syndrome won the Audience Award at Tampere Film Festival in 2012 and the Jussi Award for the best documentary film in 2013. It was awarded as the "most innovative feature film" at the Visions du Réel film festival in Switzerland in 2012. In 2013 it also won the audience award in the SXGlobal category at the SXSW festival in Austin, Texas. In March 2013 the film was awarded a special award for "passionate optimism and upholding the ideals of humanism in life" at the 10th Docudays UA festival in Ukraine. In October 2013, the film won a Citizens' Prize at the Yamagata International Documentary Film Festival.

== Reception ==
In Variety John Anderson described The Punk Syndrome as a "funny, edgy and very human feature" which might turn into a cult-hit. In his review in The Observer, Philip French called The Punk Syndrome "a very likable, relaxed film". David Parkinson at Empire magazine gave it three out of five stars calling it "candid and compassionate".

== Sequel ==
In 2017, a new documentary about the band's retirement directed by Kärkkäinen called The Punk Voyage (Finnish: Tokasikajuttu) was nominated for two Jussie Awards and won the main prize at the 2018 Tampere Film Festival.
