= Raskasta Joulua =

Finnish band

- Origin: Finland
- Years active: 2004–present
- Labels: T2 Productions; Spinefarm; Warner Music Finland; Gramophone Records
- Members: Erkka Korhonen; Erkki Silvennoinen; Mirka Rantanen; Tuomas Wäinölä; Vili Ollila
- Website: www.raskastajoulua.com

Raskasta Joulua is a music project from Finland in which diverse artists have recorded traditional Christmas carols and Christmas hits in a heavy metal style. "Raskasta joulua" is a term in Finnish which means "heavy Christmas" in English. The concept was founded by guitarist Erkka Korhonen in 2004. Many notable Finnish metal vocalists have appeared on Raskasta Joulua albums and tours, including Marko Hietala, Jarkko Ahola, Ari Koivunen, Juha-Pekka Leppaluoto and Tony Kakko.

The band's first album, Raskasta Joulua, contained performances by the Trans-Siberian Orchestra and was produced by T2 Productions. The album was released in December 2004.

The second album was released on the Warner label in 2006 after a promotional 3-concert tour in December 2005 increased the popularity of the project. This led to increased sales of the subsequent releases. Raskasta Joulua have toured every year since 2005 and the 3 concert tour has become an annual tradition.

In 2013 the band changed their record label for the second time and signed to Spinefarm Records. They also released their second self-titled album, which achieved platinum status in Finland. In 2014, it was followed by two new albums, Raskasta Joulua 2 and Ragnarok Juletide, the latter of which is their first album recorded in the English language. The other albums are in Finnish.

== Discography ==
- Raskasta Joulua (Heavy Christmas) (T2 Productions, 2004)
- Raskaampaa Joulua (Heavier Christmas) (Warner, 2006)
- Raskasta Joulua (Heavy Christmas) (Spinefarm, 2013)
- Raskasta Joulua Kaksi (Heavy Christmas 2) (Spinefarm, 2014)
- Ragnarok Juletide (Spinefarm, 2014)
- Tulkoon joulu - akustisesti (Spinefarm, 2015)
- Raskasta Joulua IV (Spinefarm, 2017)
- Viides Adventti (Gramophone Records, 2022)
- Raskasta Joulua 10-vuotisjuhlaversio (Universal Music Oy, 2023)

== Members ==
=== 2016 line-up ===
- Erkka Korhonen – guitar
- Vili Ollila – keyboards
- Mirka Rantanen – drums
- Erkki Silvennoinen – bass
- Tuomas Wäinölä – guitar
- Marko Hietala – vocals
- JP Leppäluoto – vocals
- Ari Koivunen – vocals
- Antony Parviainen – vocals
- Tommi Salmela – vocals
- Pasi Rantanen – vocals
- Kimmo Blom – vocals
- Elize Ryd – vocals
- Antti Railio – vocals
- Ville Tuomi – vocals
- Floor Jansen – vocals
- Jarkko Ahola – vocals
- Tarja Turunen - vocals
