= Pertti Kurikan Nimipäivät =

Finnish punk band

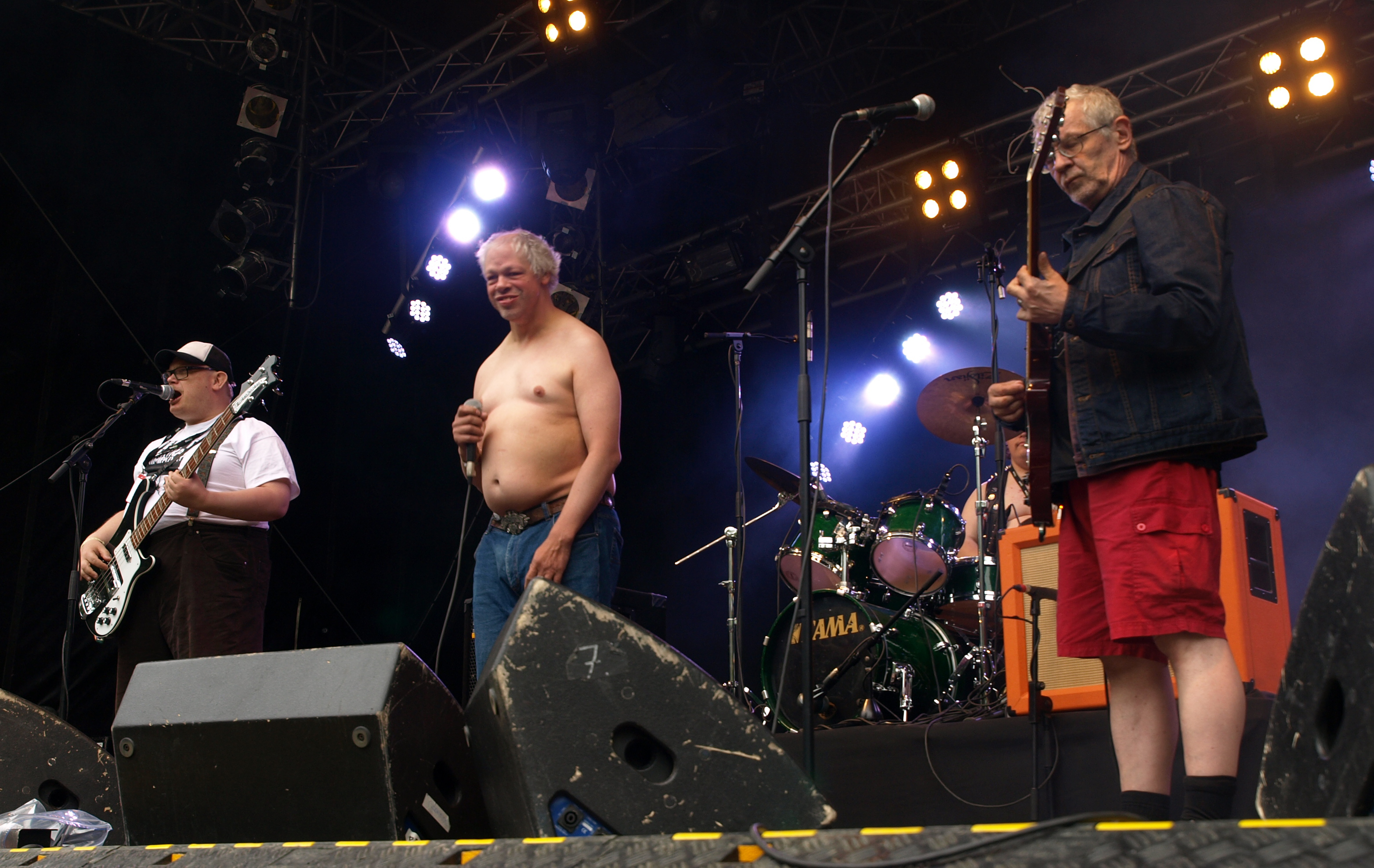
- The band performing at Provinssirock in 2013

Background information
- Also known as: PKN
- Origin: Helsinki, Finland
- Genres: Punk rock, outsider music
- Years active: 2009–2016, 2017
- Labels: Red Lounge Records, Sony Music
- Members: Pertti Kurikka; Kari Aalto; Sami Helle; Toni Välitalo
- Website: www.pkn.rocks

Pertti Kurikan Nimipäivät (Finnish for 'Pertti Kurikka's name day party'; pronounced [ˈpertːi ˈkurikɑn ˈnimiˌpæi̯væt]; PKN) was a Finnish punk rock band, formed in 2009 in a charity workshop for adults with developmental disabilities. They are the main focus of the 2012 Finnish documentary film The Punk Syndrome. In 2015, they qualified for the finals of Uuden Musiikin Kilpailu, which they later won; they represented Finland in the Eurovision Song Contest 2015 but got knocked out in the semi-final. The group disbanded in December 2016 when guitarist Pertti Kurikka turned 60 years old and retired from playing punk rock.

== History ==
=== Formation (2004–2012) ===
Pertti Kurikan Nimipäivät began in a workshop run by Lyhty, a charity for adults with developmental disabilities. In 2004, Pertti Kurikka, the future guitarist of the band, met organizer Kalle Pajamaa of Lyhty. Pajamaa noticed Kurikka's potential and sought to establish a band based upon him. They worked on the band's formation over the next five years, and in 2009 the band made its debut.

In 2009, Finnish director Pekka Karjalainen sought music performed by people with disabilities for the film Vähän kunnioitusta, which tells the story of a young girl with a learning disability aspiring to live an independent and normal life. Pertti Kurikan Nimipäivät is featured in the film with their first-ever demo: "Kallioon!". The song became a hit, and the band soon discovered that they had a following outside the circle of disabled people.

In 2012, their fame grew as they were the main subject of The Punk Syndrome, a Finnish documentary film. The documentary, depicting the band's story from its outset to their first European tour, earned them a following in Scandinavia and Germany.

=== 2014: Charity concert with Mr. Lordi ===
In 2014, the band performed in a charity concert with Mr. Lordi of the Finnish rock band, Lordi. The charity concert was held in Rovaniemi on 23 May 2014 for benefit of the mentally-disabled community of Mozambique and the Lapland Metkat Association. Pertti Kurikan Nimipäivät's bold and unusual take on Eurovision has been compared to that of Lordi, Finland's 2006 Eurovision entry and the winner of that year's contest.

=== 2015: Eurovision Song Contest 2015 ===
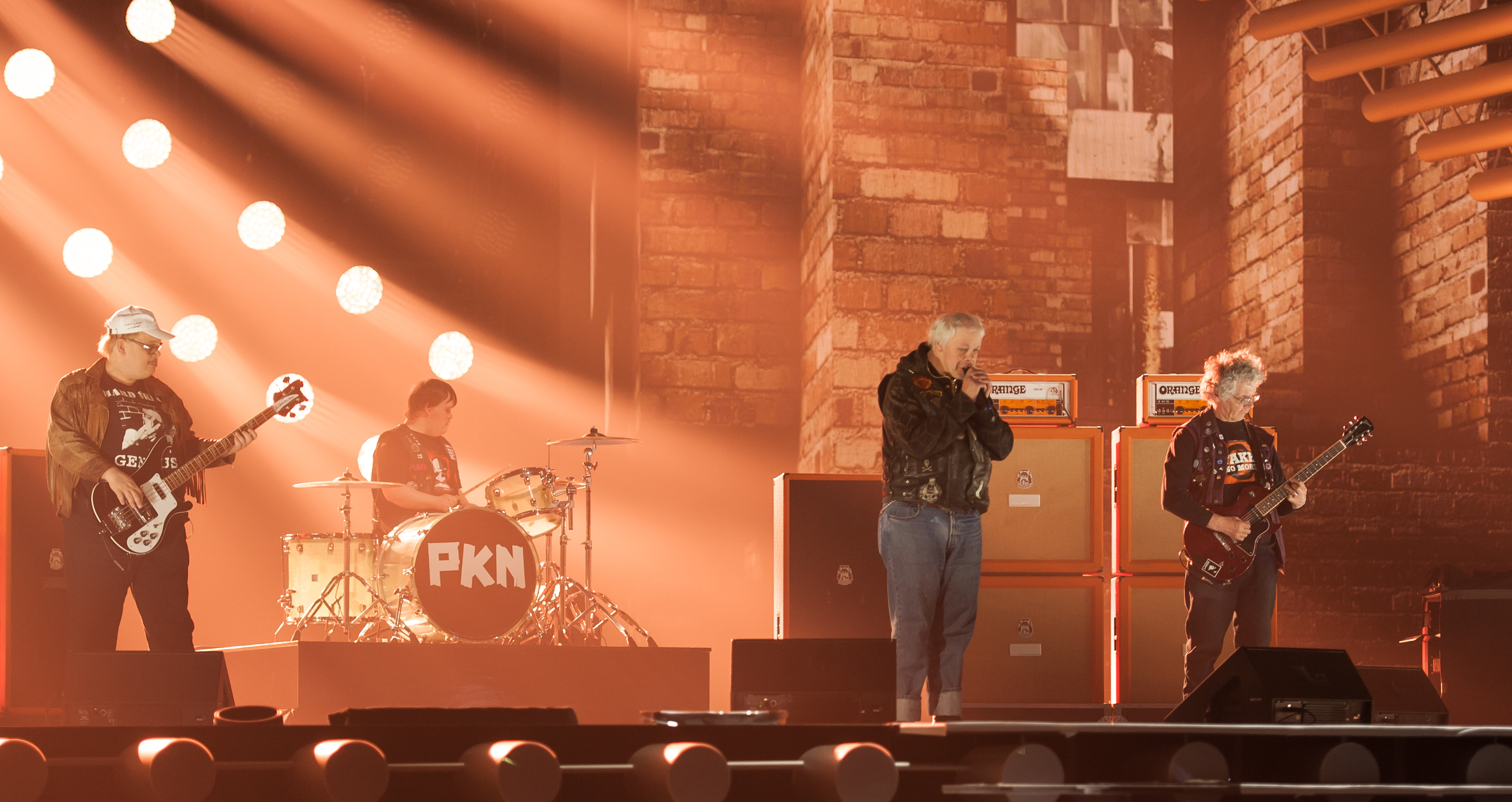
ESC 2015 Pertti Kurikan Nimipäivät

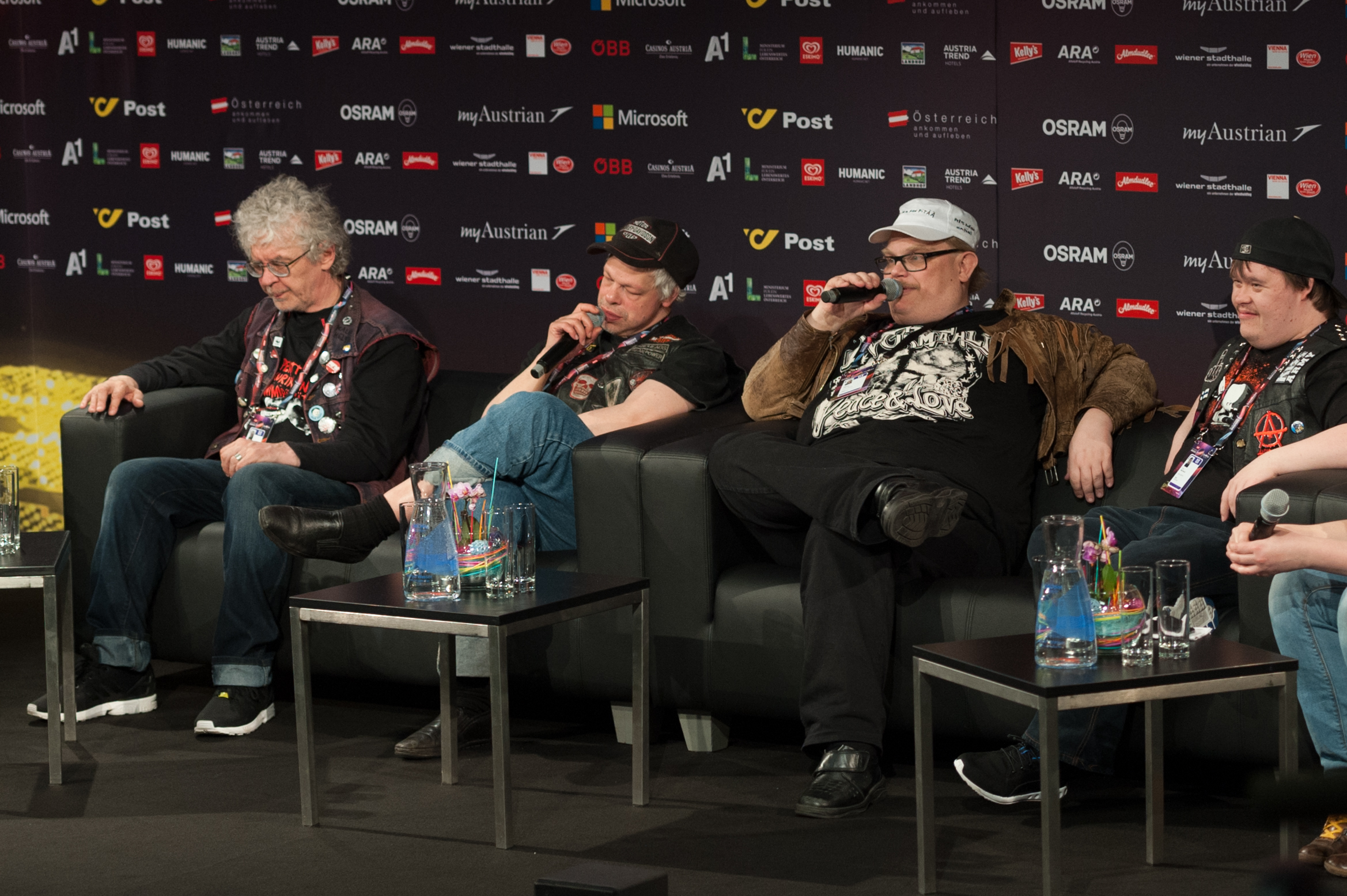
ESC 2015 the interview

The band entered Uuden Musiikin Kilpailu, Finland's national selection for Eurovision Song Contest 2015 with the song "Aina mun pitää". They entered the contest in order to raise awareness for people with Down syndrome. On 7 February 2015, the band was one of the three acts from the first-semi finals to advance to the finals. On 28 February 2015, the band won Uuden Musiikin Kilpailu 2015, thereby becoming Finland's representative for the Eurovision Song Contest in Vienna, Austria in May 2015. PKN was the first punk band to compete in Eurovision.

PKN's Eurovision bid was noticed by the international media and covered, for instance, by the BBC, The Guardian, VICE and the Associated Press.

Posti issued a PKN stamp on 11 May 2015, eight days before the first Eurovision semi-final in Vienna.

On 26 December 2016, the group performed their final concert, intended to mark Kurikka's 60th birthday, upon which he had long planned to retire from the music industry. The group disbanded after the show.

In 2017, the group re-united for a one-off charity concert.

== Members ==
The band had four members: guitarist Pertti Kurikka, vocalist Kari Aalto, bassist Sami Helle and Toni Välitalo on drums. All members have either Down syndrome or autism.

=== Pertti Kurikka ===
Pertti Kurikka (born 26 December 1956 in Vihti) was the band's guitarist. He wrote the music for the band and also some of the lyrics. He has released a spoken word cassette and a book of horror stories under the pseudonym Kalevi Helvetti. He also edits a zine called "Kotipäivä" ("Home Day").

Kurikka has been listening to punk for 30 years, but also listened to many other music genres ranging from classical to schlager and disco to children's music. He visits church regularly and retired from the music industry at the age of 60. He can also play the street organ.

=== Kari Aalto ===
Kari Aalto (born 25 May 1976 in Tampere) was the singer of the band and also writes most of their lyrics. He is a school friend of Kurikka. He has his own talk show on Finnish local radio station Bassoradio. He can play drums, bass and keyboards. He loves motorcycles, American cars, women and alcohol. He listens to 1950s and 1960s rock, psychobilly, rockabilly, surf, reggae, doowop and also rap, heavy metal and folk. He does not listen to punk in his spare time, as nowadays it is his profession.

=== Sami Helle ===
Sami Helle (born 1973 (age 52–53)) played bass in the band and also sang background vocals. As a child he lived in Boston, New York City, Paris and Antibes, so he can speak fluent English. He is politically active as a member of the Finnish Central Party and also as activist of Me itse, an organization of disabled people. He wishes to become a municipal councillor of Helsinki and later a member of the parliament.

Helle independently released a solo album, Blue Moments, under the name Sam Heat. The sound is more gentle, a musical departure from the punk sound of PKN. Helle wrote the music and lyrics for the entire album.

=== Toni Välitalo ===
Toni Välitalo (born 1982 (age 43–44) or 1983 (age 42–43)) was the drummer and also the youngest member of the band. He started playing drums at the age of six. In addition to punk, he plays other genres such as jenkka, blues and mazurka. His favourite music is Finnish schlager.

=== Kalle Pajamaa ===
Disability director Kalle Pajamaa (born 1979) is the band's concert manager and arranges the songs for the band. He is affectionately called the fifth member of the band.

== Discography ==
=== Albums ===
Title	Details	Peak chart positions
Title	Details	FIN
Letkukytkentöjä	Released: 14 October 2016; Label: Hikinauhat; Format: Digital download, CD, LP, Cassette	
"—" denotes an album that did not chart or was not released in that territory.

=== Compilation albums ===
Title	Details	Peak chart positions
Title	Details	FIN
Kuus kuppia kahvia ja yks kokis	Released: 7 December 2012; Label: Airiston Punk-levyt; Format: Digital download, CD, LP	17
Sikakovapaketti	Released: 2012; Label: N/A; Format: Box set with DVD, CD and cassette	—
Coffee Not Tea	Released: 2013; Label: Constant Flux; Format: Cassette	—
The Best of Greatest Hits	Released: 8 May 2015; Label: Epic Records; Format: Digital download, CD, LP	4
"—" denotes an album that did not chart or was not released in that territory.

=== Extended plays ===
Title	Details
Ei yhteiskunta yhtä miestä kaipaa	Released: October 2010; Label: Airiston Punk-Levyt, Red Lounge Records; Format: 7-inch EP; Split with Kakka-hätä 77
Päättäjä on pettäjä	Released: June 2011; Label: Headbands; Format: Cassette
Osaa eläimetkin pieree	Released: November 2011; Label: Mauski Records, Punk & Pillu; Format: 7-inch EP
Asuntolaelämää	Released: October 2012; Label: Airiston Punk-levyt; Format: 7-inch EP
Jarmo	Released: 20 November 2013; Label: Airiston Punk-Levyt, Punk & Pillu; Format: 7-inch EP
Mies haisee / Joe Weider	Released: February 2015; Label: Mauski Records, Punk & Pillu; Format: 7-inch EP; Split with Karanteeni
Oma rauha	Released: March 2015; Label: Airiston punk-levyt, Mutant; Format: 7-inch EP
12-inch split	Released: March 2015; Label: Blast of Silence Records; Format: 12-inch EP; Split with M.O.T.O.

=== Singles ===
Title	Year	Album
"Mongoloidi"	2014	Non-album singles
"Me ollaan runkkareita" split with Hard Skin	2014	Non-album singles
"Aina mun pitää"	2015	Non-album singles
"Pertti käyttää kondomia"	2015	Non-album singles
"Kännissä kotiin, aamulla töihin"	2016	Letkukytkentöjä

Awards and achievements
Preceded by Softengine with "Something Better"	Finland in the Eurovision Song Contest; 2015	Succeeded by Sandhja with "Sing It Away"
