= Järjestyshäiriö =

Finnish pop rock band

- Origin: Finland
- Genres: Pop rock
- Years active: 1997–2016
- Labels: Spinefarm Records (–2005), Levy-yhtiö (2006–2008), Warner Music Finland (2008–2016)
- Members: Juho Markkanen; Juha Ryhänen; Matti Keränen; Mikko Manninen; Sirja Minkovitsch
- Website: http://www.jarjestyshairio.net/

Järjestyshäiriö was a Finnish pop rock band, founded in 1997 in the town of Jyväskylä by members Juho Markkanen, Mikko Manninen, and Juha Ryhänen, with Matti Keränen and Sirja Minkovitsch joining later on in the groups lifetime. Their influences include Eppu Normaali, Depeche Mode, and Queen.

Their first album, Tuhlatut päivät, valvotut yöt, was released by Spinefarm Records in 2005. After the first album by Spinefarm, they turned to the Lahti-based recording company Levy-yhtiö, which released their second album Takapihojen rocktähdet syksyllä in 2006. In the autumn of 2007, Takapihojen rocktähdet syksyllä was re-released as Takapihojen Rocktähdet+ in a USB-friendly format. This was Finland's first ever music album released in USB format.

In 2008, the band signed a contract with Warner Music Finland, and in 2009 released their third album Lopullinen ratkaisu. One of the singles in the album, Karkuri, managed to become the most downloaded song in Finland for a short period of time, and was played on the popular Finnish radio station YleX. In Finland's music charts, it succeeded the Eurovision Song Contest 2009 winner Alexander Rybak's song Fairytale.

The group, by 2010, was working on a fourth studio album. Jyrki Tuovisen, a fellow singer and sound engineer, said the album will be released on 20 February 2015. Järjestyshäiriö's first standalone single, Rantakatu, was released in March 2014.

The group competed in the Uuden Musiikin Kilpailu 2015 with the song Särkyneiden sydänten kulmilla. The song progressed from the third semi-final, and competed to represent Finland in the Eurovision Song Contest 2015. They came in last place.

In November 2015, they announced that they would break up in January 2016.

== Discography ==
=== Albums ===
Name	Publication information	List	Sales
Name	Publication information	Album list	Sales
Tuhlatut päivät, valvotut yöt	Release date: 23 February 2005; Format: CD; Label: Spinefarm Records	–	–
Takapihojen rocktähdet	Release date: 15 November 2006; Format: CD/Digital; Label: Levy-yhtiö	–	–
Takapihojen rocktähdet+	Release date: Autumn 2007; Format: USB; Label: Levy-yhtiö	–	–
Lopullinen ratkaisu	Release date: 20 May 2009; Format: CD/Digital; Label: Warner Music Finland	–	–
Yöjuttu	Release date: 20 February 2015; Format: CD/Digital; Label: Warner Music Finland	–	–

=== EPs ===
Name	Publication information	List	Sales
Name	Publication information	Singles list	Sales
Kunnes toisin todistetaan	Release date: 2004; Format: CD	#9	–

=== Singles ===
Year	Single	Download list	Single list	Radio list	Album
2004	”Levoton”	–	–	–	Tuhlatut päivät, valvotut yöt
2005	”John Doe”	–	18	–	Tuhlatut päivät, valvotut yöt
2006	”Lähiön lapset”	–	17	–	Takapihojen rocktähdet
2006	”Tahtoisin”	–	–	–	Takapihojen rocktähdet
2007	”Jos et mua saa”	2	12	–	Takapihojen rocktähdet
2009	”Karkuri”	1	1	–	Lopullinen ratkaisu
2009	”Täynnä voimaa”	13	–		Lopullinen ratkaisu
2009	”Muuri”	–	–	–	Lopullinen ratkaisu
2014	”Rantakatu”	–	–	48	Yöjuttu
2015	”Särkyneiden sydänten kulmilla”	–	–	–	Yöjuttu

=== Music videos ===
- Tahtoisin (2006)
- Karkuri (2009 – dir. Jesse Hietanen)
- Rantakatu (2014)
- Särkyneiden sydänten kulmilla (2015)
