= Softengine =

Finnish alternative rock band

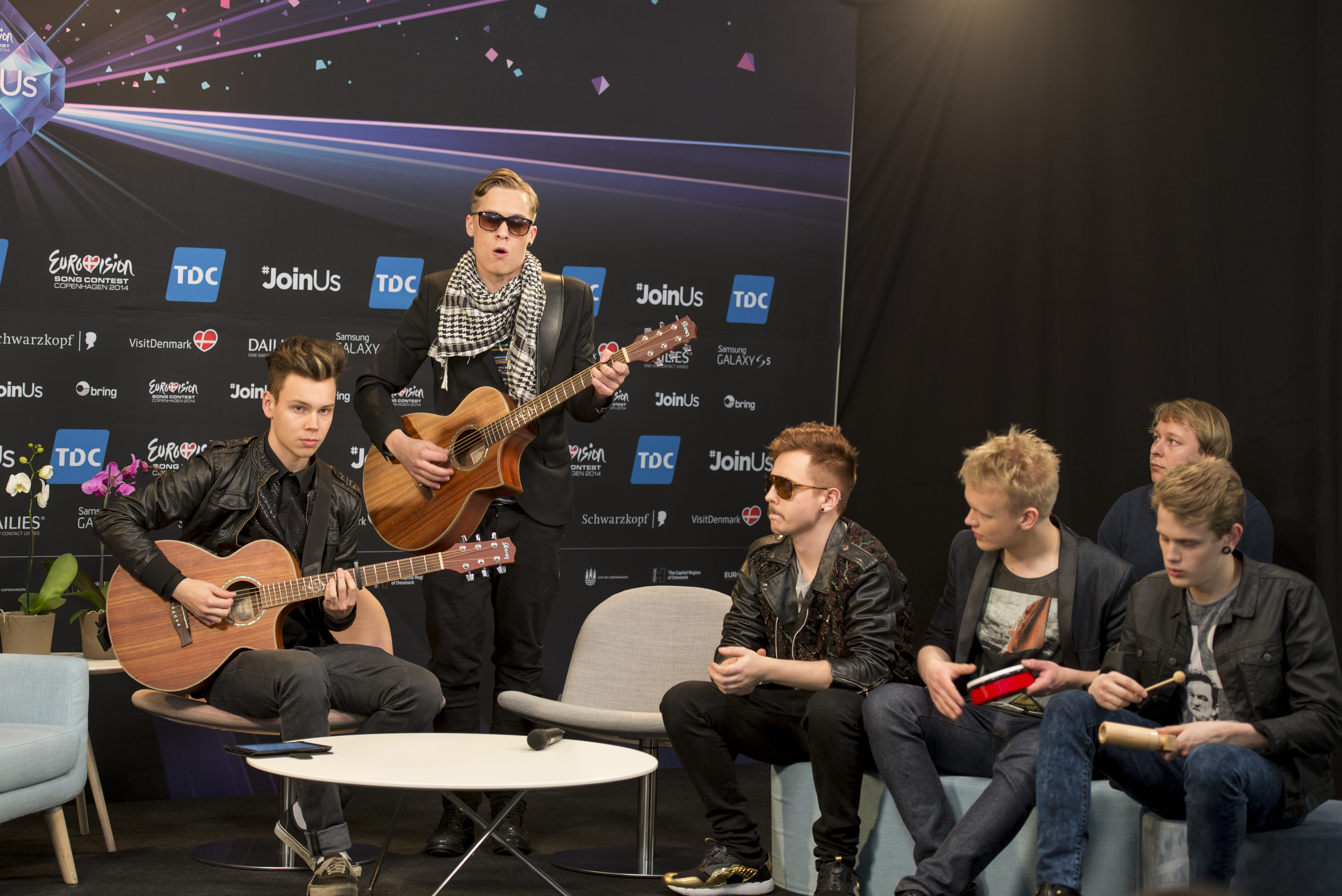
- Softengine (2014)

Background information
- Origin: Seinäjoki, Finland
- Genres: Alternative rock
- Years active: 2011–2018
- Labels: Sony Music (2014–2018)
- Members: Topi Latukka (born 1994); Ossi Mäkelä; Tuomo Alarinta
- Past members: Kasimir Kantonen; Eero Keskinen; Henri Oskár (born 1994)

Softengine is a Finnish alternative rock band that represented Finland in the Eurovision Song Contest 2014 in Copenhagen, Denmark, with their song "Something Better". They released their debut album We Created the World in October 2014. The band's members were born between 1994 and 1997.

The first of two parts of their second studio album was released as an EP on 4 December 2015 entitled From Earth, From Ashes, From Dust. It includes the release of the singles "All About You & I" and "Big Fat Bass Drums".

== Music career ==
=== 2011–13: Formation and early beginnings ===
The band was formed in the city of Seinäjoki, Finland in the summer of 2011 at the cottage of the grandparents of singer/guitarist/songwriter Topi Latukka. They came to their line-up in the summer of 2013, after diligent songwriting, practising, gigging and success in band competitions.

=== 2013–14: Eurovision Song Contest and We Created the World ===
Softengine presenting themselves and Something Better at the Eurovision Song Contest 2014.

On 10 December 2013 Softengine was revealed as one of the acts for Uuden Musiikin Kilpailu 2014. On 11 January 2014 they won their Heat to advance to the final. On 1 February 2014 Softengine were chosen to represent Finland with the song "Something Better" at the Eurovision Song Contest at the B&W Hallerne in Copenhagen, Denmark. During the semi-final allocation draw on 20 January 2014 at the Copenhagen City Hall, Finland were drawn to compete in the second half of the second semi-final on 8 May 2014. In the second semi-final, the producers of the show decided that Finland would perform 8th, following Lithuania and preceding Ireland. They released their Eurovision song "Something Better" on 21 March 2014. The song got qualified to the final with 3rd place and 97 points. At the final, they performed 18th, following Slovenia and preceding Spain. Their final result was 11th place with 72 points, Finland's best placing since 2006. In June 2014 they released a new single, called "Yellow House". In September 2014 it was announced that bassist Eero Keskinen would leave the band to focus on his career as a lighting technician. On 3 October 2014 they brought a new single out "The Sirens", the official video was released on YouTube on the 17 October 2014. Also on 17 October 2014 they released their debut album We Created the World. The debut album features 11 songs, including singles Something Better, Yellow House and The Sirens. "What If I?" was released as a single on 17 December 2014, along with a music video.

=== 2015 ===
The band appeared on the Finnish Eurovision selection show UMK in March 2015, to perform an acoustic version of "Something Better" followed by "The Sirens". On 17 June 2015, the band released "All About You And I".

== Discography ==
=== Albums ===
Title	Details	Peak chart positions
Title	Details	FIN
We Created the World	Released: 17 October 2014; Label: Sony Music; Format: Digital download, CD	7

=== Extended plays ===
Title	Details	Peak chart positions
Title	Details	FIN
From Earth, From Ashes, From Dust	Released: 4 December 2015; Label: Sony Music; Formats: Digital download, CD	—
"—" denotes an album that did not chart or was not released in that territory.

=== Singles ===
Title	Year	Peak chart positions				Album
Title	Year	AUT	GER	IRE	UK	Album
"Broken Reflection"	2014	—	—	—	—	We Created the World
"Circle"	2014	—	—	—	—	We Created the World
"In Disarray"	2014	—	—	—	—	We Created the World
"Narcissus"	2014	—	—	—	—	We Created the World
"Our Life, Our Love"	2014	—	—	—	—	We Created the World
"Our New Age"	2014	—	—	—	—	We Created the World
"Phone Call from Unknown"	2014	—	—	—	—	We Created the World
"Something Better"	2014	62	80	72	93	We Created the World
"The Sirens"	2014	—	—	—	—	We Created the World
"What If I?"	2014	—	—	—	—	We Created the World
"Yellow House"	2014	—	—	—	—	We Created the World
"All About You & I"	2015	—	—	—	—	From Earth, From Ashes, From Dust
"Big Fat Bass Drums"	2015	—	—	—	—	From Earth, From Ashes, From Dust
"Golden Years"	2015	—	—	—	—	From Earth, From Ashes, From Dust
"Raise a Glass"	2015	—	—	—	—	From Earth, From Ashes, From Dust
"Free Rider"	2016	—	—	—	—	Non-album singles
"She Is My Messiah"	2016	—	—	—	—	Non-album singles
"—" denotes single that did not chart or was not released in that territory.

Awards and achievements
Preceded by Krista Siegfrids with "Marry Me"	Finland in the Eurovision Song Contest; 2014	Succeeded by Pertti Kurikan Nimipäivät with "Aina mun pitää"
