= Aina mun pitää =

2015 single by Pertti Kurikan Nimipäivät

Single by Pertti Kurikan Nimipäivät
- Released: 13 January 2015
- Recorded: 2014
- Genre: punk rock
- Length: 1:27
- Label: Sony Music Finland
- Songwriter: Pertti Kurikan Nimipäivät

Pertti Kurikan Nimipäivät singles chronology
"Me ollaan runkkareita" (2014)	"Aina mun pitää" (2015)	"Mies haisee" (2015)

Eurovision Song Contest 2015 entry
- Country: Finland
- Artist: Pertti Kurikan Nimipäivät
- Language: Finnish
- Composer: Pertti Kurikan Nimipäivät
- Lyricist: Pertti Kurikan Nimipäivät

Finals performance
- Semi-final result: 16th
- Semi-final points: 13

Entry chronology
- ◄ "Something Better" (2014)
- "Sing It Away" (2016) ►

"Aina mun pitää" (pronounced [ˈɑi̯nɑ mum ˈpitæː]; English: I always have to) is a song by Finnish punk rock band Pertti Kurikan Nimipäivät. The song won Uuden Musiikin Kilpailu (UMK) 2015 and represented Finland in the Eurovision Song Contest 2015.

== Background and release ==
On 7 January 2015, it was leaked through Spotify that Pertti Kurikan Nimipäivät would compete in Uuden Musiikin Kilpailu 2015 with the song "Aina mun pitää", along with the seventeen other competing artists. The official music video was presented on 13 January on both the band's Vevo account and UMK's YouTube channel, and then, the next day, it was released on iTunes.

== Composition ==
"Aina mun pitää" is a song which runs for one minute and twenty-seven seconds. It was written by Pertti Kurikan Nimipäivät's band members. The song's lyrics are about having to engage in daily activities such as washing-up and not being allowed to engage in fun or social activities, inspired by the experience of the band members living in a residence for disabled people. It is the shortest song to be entered in the history of the Eurovision Song Contest, beating the record previously held by the United Kingdom for their 1957 entry in the contest that clocked in at one minute and fifty-two seconds.

== Live performances ==
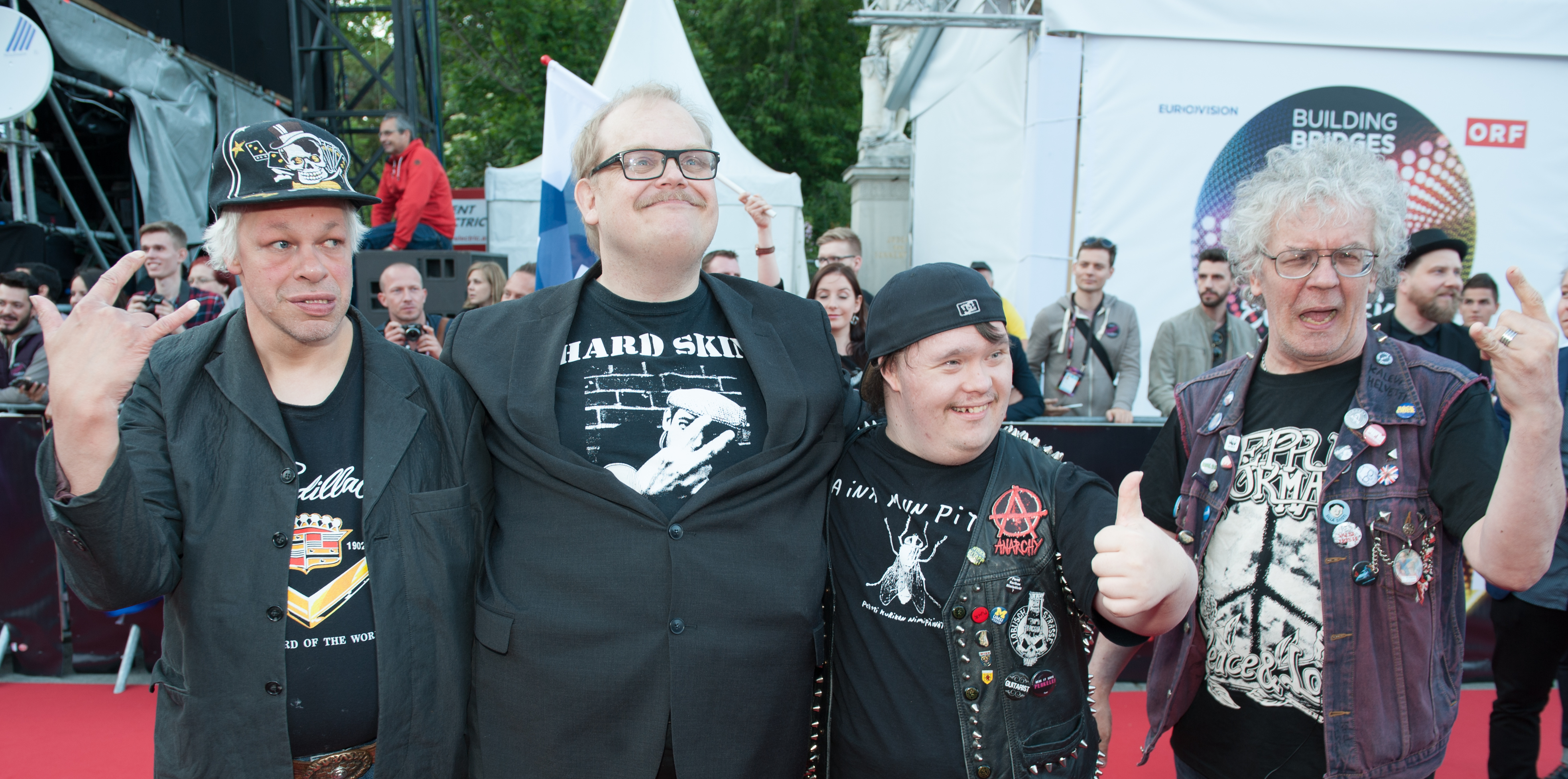
ESC 2015 Pertti Kurikan Nimipäivät

The song was performed live for the first time during the first semi-final of Uuden Musiikin Kilpailu 2015, the Finnish national selection for the Eurovision Song Contest. It was later performed as well in the grand final three weeks later where it won the competition. Pertti Kurikan Nimipäivät also performed the song during the first half of the first semi-final of the Eurovision Song Contest 2015 in Vienna. They finished 16th out of 16 countries, failing to qualify for the Grand Final.

== Track listing ==
Digital download
No.	Title	Length
1.	"Aina mun pitää"	1:27
2.	"Diagnoosivammainen"	1:29
3.	"Sofianlehto"	1:07
