= Mikko Silvennoinen =

Finnish television producer, presenter and journalist (born 1975)

Mikko Silvennoinen (14 May 1975 in Kiihtelysvaara) is a Finnish television host, journalist and producer. At 18, he started as a host of the music programme Jyrki. He was one of the first well-known faces of the show.

After hosting Jyrki for one year, Silvennoinen left to study television in the United States where he did interviews and reports about the world of entertainment for Nelonen and the magazines Apu and Katso. He graduated from California State University in 2000 with a Bachelor of Arts degree in Communications Studies and Broadcast Journalism. The following year, he brought the show Hollywood eXpress to Nelonen.

After returning from his studies, Silvennoinen continued to work at Nelonen, working on both sides of the camera. His most significant work on television is considered to be the show 4POP which he both edited and hosted from 2003 to 2004. The show was a weekly programme of pop culture.

Silvennoinen's newest show, however, was not a success. The talk show Kuka, mitä, häh?, which was placed in the Thursday night time slot of the ambitiously legendary Hyvät, pahat ja rumat show, was cancelled only after a few episodes in spring 2007. Silvennoinen himself hosted the show along with five regular guests, and also a few special guests.

As a television producer, Silvennoinen was honored with the job of producing the popular Hauskat kotivideot, which shows videos from America's Funniest Home Videos. The show is hosted by Sampo Marjomaa.

Silvennoinen has openly spoken about his homosexuality. He has written columns for the gay magazine Voltti (formerly Z-lehti) and worked as a member of the Seta board from 2005 to 2006. The magazine City voted him as the city's best gay celebrity.

Since January 2011, he has been the television programme director of the Estonian TV3. He lives in Kalamaja.

Since 2016 Silvennoinen has provided commentary for the Eurovision Song Contest and Uuden Musiikin Kilpailu on television, on national public-broadcasting company YLE. In June 2026, Silvennoinen was named executive produce of UMK.

== Television shows ==
Hosted

- Jyrki (1995–1996)
- Hollywood eXpress (2001)
- 4POP (2003–2004)
- Jussi-gaala
- Kuka, mitä, häh? (2007)
