= Kimmo Blom =

Finnish vocalist and stage artist (1970–2022)

- Also known as: Angelo De Nile
- Born: 31 January 1970; Orimattila, Finland
- Died: 25 August 2022 (aged 52)
- Genres: Rock, Pop, hard rock, heavy metal
- Occupation: Singer
- Instrument: Vocals
- Years active: 1987–2022

Kimmo Sakari Blom (31 January 1970 – 25 August 2022) was a Finnish singer and stage artist, known for his work in several rock and metal bands such as Urban Tale, Boys of the Band, and Heartplay. From 2004, he performed in the Finnish Christmas metal project Raskasta Joulua and from 2018, he was the lead vocalist of melodic metal band Leverage. He has also provided backing vocals for metal bands such as Stratovarius, Thunderstone, Kiuas, Ari Koivunen, Timo Tolkki's Avalon, and Twilight Guardians. Between 2018 and 2020 he also participated in the swedish band Sapphire Eyes.

== Career ==
In 2010, Kimmo and his band Boys of the Band applied to represent Finland at the Eurovision Song Contest 2010 with the song "America (I Think I Love You)", but weren't successful in qualifying for the final. Five years later, and under the pseudonym of Angelo De Nile, he performed in Uuden Musiikin Kilpailu 2015, the national final for Finland in the Eurovision Song Contest 2015, with the song "All For Victory", and came in 5th place. A year later, this time together with Annica Milán, he again tried his luck to represent Finland at the Eurovision Song Contest 2016 with the song "Good Enough", which again finished in 5th place.

== Personal life and death ==
Kimmo Blom died of cancer in August 2022, at the age of 52. His partner, singer Annica Milán, confirmed Blom was diagnosed with a rare conjunctival melanoma in 2015.

== Discography ==
=== Albums ===
- 1999: Edrian Sun Cycle (with Edrian Sun Cycle)
- 2001: The Album (with Heartplay)
- 2001: Urban Tale (with Urban Tale)
- 2003: Signs of Time (with Urban Tale)
- 2004: Where The Deadends Meet (with Heartplay)
- 2004: Raskasta Joulua (with Raskasta Joulua)
- 2005: Northern Light (with Northern Light)
- 2008: This Is My World (with Dyecrest)
- 2010: Does I Can? (with Boys of the Band)
- 2013: Charming Grace (with Charming Grace)
- 2014: Raskasta Joulua 2 (with Raskasta Joulua)
- 2014: Ragnarok Juletide (with Ragnarok Juletide)
- 2015: Tulkoon Joulu – Akustisesti (with Raskasta Joulua)
- 2018: Raskasta Joulua IV (with Raskasta Joulua)
- 2018: Breath Of Ages (with Sapphire Eyes)
- 2019: Raskasta Iskelmää (with Raskasta Iskelmää)
- 2019: Determinus (with Leverage)
- 2020: Magic Moments (with Sapphire Eyes)
- 2021: Above the Beyond (with Leverage)

=== Singles ===
- 1991: "The Dragonman" (with Nova Scotia)
- 1991: "Unwritten Tale Parts 3 & 4" (with Nova Scotia)
- 2000: "Masters Of Your Mind" (with Heartplay)
- 2000: "I'll Be Your Shelter" (with Heartplay)
- 2001: "One Day (I'll Make You Mine)" (with Urban Tale)
- 2004: "Olet minun" (with Mr C)
- 2004: "Kuului laulu enkelten" (with Raskasta Joulua)
- 2010: "America (I Think I Love You)" (with Boys of the Band)
- 2011: "Kings And Queens" (with Boys of the Band)
- 2014: "We Celebrate At Christmastime – Medley" (with Ragnarok Juletide)
- 2014: "Christmas Has Come" (with Ragnarok Juletide)
- 2014: "Kellot kuulla saa" (with Raskasta Joulua)
- 2014: "Joulu, juhla parahin" (with Raskasta Joulua)
- 2015: "Tulkoon joulu (Acoustic)" (with Raskasta Joulua)
- 2015: "Ensimmäinen joulu (Acoustic)" (with Raskasta Joulua)
- 2015: "All For Victory" (as Angelo De Nile)
- 2016: "Good Enough" (as Annica Milán & Kimmo Blom)
- 2016: "Rhyme Or Reason" (as Annica Milán & Kimmo Blom)
- 2017: "Take Me As I Am" (as Annica Milán & Kimmo Blom)
- 2017: "Joulun rauhaa" (with Raskasta Joulua)
- 2018: "Joulumuisto" (with Raskasta Joulua)
- 2018: "Red Moon Over Sonora" (with Leverage)
- 2018: "Wheels From Hell" (with Leverage)
- 2019: "Mä elän vieläkin" (with Raskasta Iskelmää)
- 2019: "Rikoo on riskillä ruma" (with Raskasta Iskelmää)
- 2019: "Kesäkatu" (with Raskasta Iskelmää)
- 2019: "Burn Love Burn" (with Leverage)
- 2019: "Wind Of Morrigan" (with Leverage)
- 2021: "Emperor" (with Leverage)
- 2021: "Starlight" (with Leverage)

==== As featured artist ====
- 2000: "En piittaiskaan" (Pop & Jazz Konservatorio Feat. Kimmo Blom)
- 2001: "So You Wanna Play Ball..." (Helsinki Roosters Feat. Kimmo Blom)
- 2003: "Not That Innocent" (Radioactive Feat. Kimmo Blom)
- 2003: "7 A.M." (Radioactive Feat. Kimmo Blom)
- 2004: "Call Of Glory" (Michael Riesenbeck Feat. Kimmo Blom)
- 2005: "Still My Hero" (Northern Light Feat. Kimmo Blom)
- 2005: "Lay Down Your Defences" (Northern Light Feat. Kimmo Blom)
- 2013: "Bring My Life Back" (Charming Grace Feat. Kimmo Blom)
- 2019: "Where The Light Was Born" (Dyecrest Feat. Kimmo Blom)
- 2019: "Alla saasteidan" (R-Syke Feat. Kimmo Blom)
- 2022: "The Day Of The Brightest Colours" (Subspace Radio Feat. Kimmo Blom)
- 2022: "Radio Silence" (Subspace Radio Feat. Kimmo Blom)
