= Shava (band) =

Finnish band

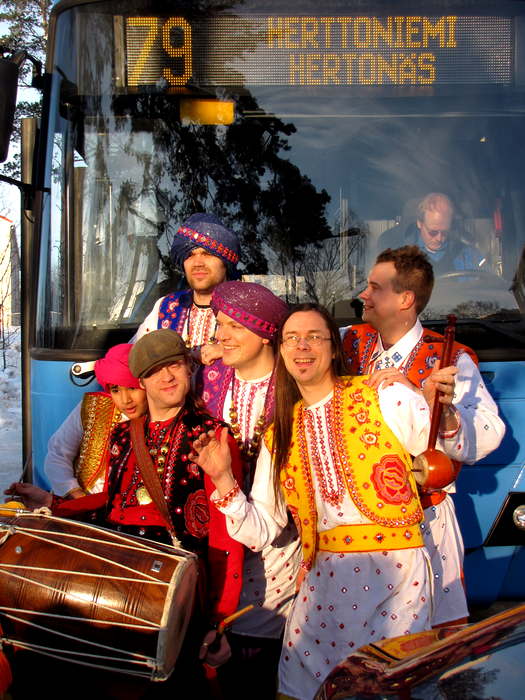
Shava

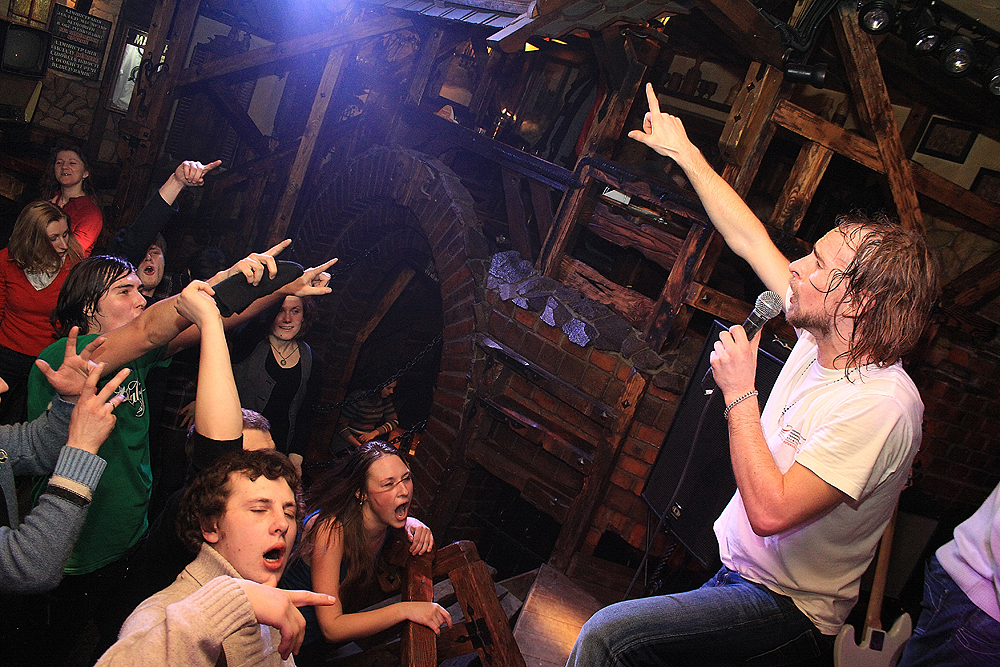
PanKe Shava 7

Shava is a band from Finland. The band calls its music Suomibhangra (Finnish Bhangra), a genre created by the band itself. Finnish Bhangra is a fusion of Finnish lyrics and Punjabi music. In 2010, the band released its first album, Betoninen kotimaani, which was voted as the audience favorite for the Folk Music Record Of The Year 2010 in Finland. The band has toured Finland, Italy, Germany, Switzerland, France, United Kingdom, Belgium, Netherlands, Canada and Iceland.

== Discography ==
- Betoninen kotimaani (2010)
- Langaton yhteys (2015)
