= Cristal Snow =

Finnish drag queen & singer (born 1975)

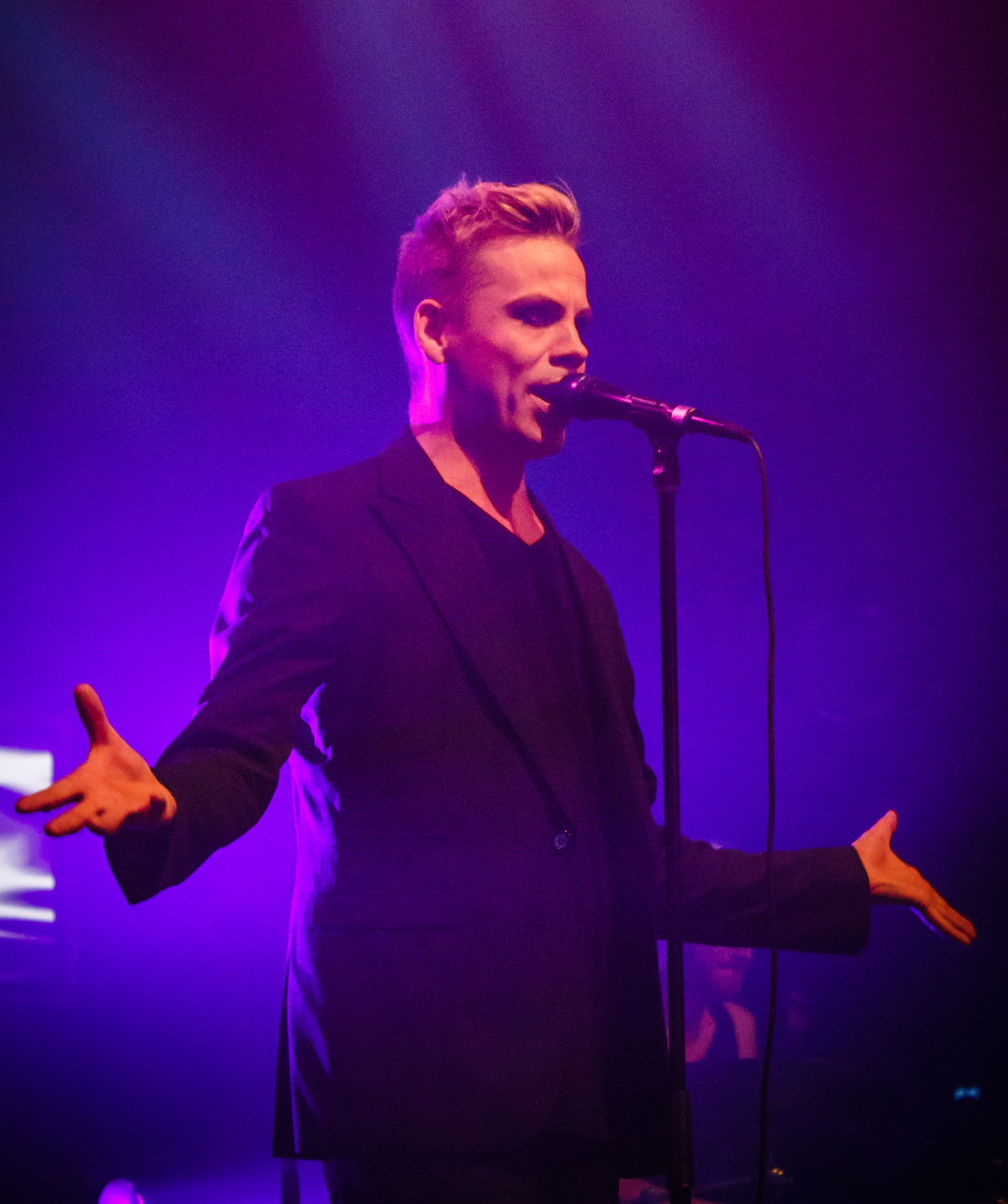
Cristal Snow performing in 2012

Tapio Huuska (born 14 July 1975), known by his stage name Cristal Snow, is a Finnish musician, television presenter, and a drag artist. He was one of the candidates to represent Finland in Eurovision Song Contest 2008. In 2016, he participated again in the preselection for Eurovision Song Contest 2016 with the song "Love Is Blind" and was placed 6th.

In March 2018, Snow started hosting the Finnish television game show Kymppitonni.

== Early life ==
Huuska was born in Naantali. When he was seven years old, his mother died and he moved with his father to Kankaanpää where he grew up. Huuska has two half-siblings from his father's second marriage, and the family also included the stepmother's two children. After Huuska graduated from an upper secondary school, he moved to the United States. He lived in New York for seven years and studied theatre at the City College of New York. During his years in New York, Huuska performed as a drag queen in nightclubs under the name Cristal Snow.

== Personal life ==
Snow is openly gay.

== Discography ==
=== Albums ===
- The Prophecy (2008)
- God You Made Me Wicked (2010)

=== Singles ===
- "Pump It Up" (2007)
- "Cristal Clear" (2007)
- "Scarred" (featuring Elena Mady) (2007)
- "Can't Save Me" (2008)
- "China Cool" (2008, promo EP, digital only)
- "Turn Me Up" (2009, promo, digital only)
- "Killing Me" (2010, promo, digital only)
- "Wicked" (2010, promo, digital only)
- "Surrender" (2010, promo EP)
- "Love Is Blind" (2016)
- "Riding The Storm" (2016)
- "Die Hard" (2016)
- "Higher Ground" (2016)
- "Indestructible" (featuring Kristiina Wheeler) (2017)
