= Rakel Liekki =

Finnish former pornographic actress

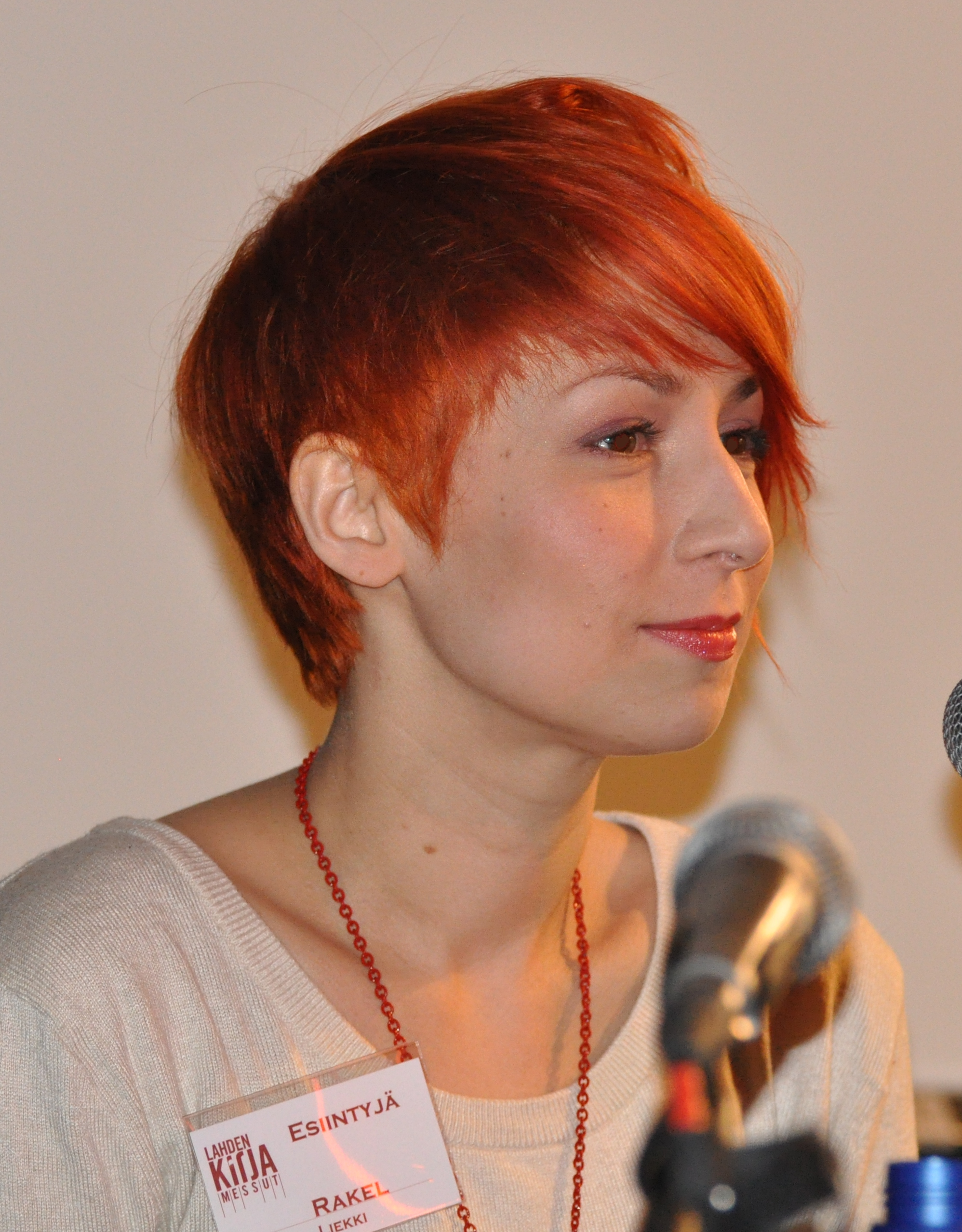
- Liekki in 2011
- Born: 20 September 1979 (age 46); Suonenjoki, Finland
- Other names: Rachel Flame, Rakel Liekki
- Height: 1.64 m (5 ft 5 in)

Tiina-Rakel Liekki (born 20 September 1979) is a Finnish artist, freelance journalist, writer, director and producer, and former pornographic actress.

== Career ==
Liekki was born in Suonenjoki. She is one of the best-known Finnish adult filmmakers, and was dubbed "the apostle of porn" in an article by City. In 2002, Liekki performed in Rakelin ja Lassin Panokoulu sex guidance videos together with Lassi Lindqvist as part of PornoStara television show on MoonTV channel. She had previously tested sex toys in the same show. She also worked for ATV on their Naked News and other adult oriented night shows. After that she worked as a producer for a Finnish digital television channel Sextv. Liekki also directed the porn film Rakel Liekki – Mun leffa.

Liekki retired from porn in 2005 and started hosting her own talk show Yö Rakelin kanssa (Night with Rachel). The talk show aired on Subtv television channel. She has since made guest appearances in other TV shows, such as Maria!, Uutisvuoto and Hurtta ja stara, based on BBC's The Underdog Show. In 2001, Liekki was featured in the music video for the song Hardboiled and Still Hellbound by Finnish black metal band Impaled Nazarene, in 2007 in the music video Broken Promised Land by Finnish rock band Private Line and in 2008 in the music video Lääke by Finnish metal band Stam1na. Her voice can be heard in The Capital Beat song "Baby Is Sleeping" (2009).

Liekki has written articles for several Finnish magazines and newspapers. She has been a regular guest on YLE's radio programme Taustapeili. In March 2008, Liekki was the poster girl for the animal welfare campaign "Irti mun munista!", organized by Animalia and SEY (Finnish Federation for the Animal Welfare Associations). In May 2008, she became a regular columnist for Uutispäivä Demari, the chief organ of the Social Democratic Party of Finland.

== Personal life ==
Liekki got a Bachelor of Arts degree from North Karelia Polytechnic, programme of fine art with painting as her major area of study in December 2001. In 2006, a work by Liekki, Mikko Hynninen and Antti Hietala, Fantasia#1 pornotähdelle (Fantasy#1 for a Porn Star), was featured in Kiasma. In 2010, Showroom Helsinki hosted an art exhibit titled "Ylisöpö!" featuring paintings by Liekki and Riikka Hyvönen.

Liekki is openly bisexual. She was married to Juha Jakonen, between 2007 and 2010. She was also in a registered partnership with a Left Alliance member of parliament Silvia Modig. They broke up in the autumn of 2011.

== Partial filmography ==
- Igor's vol 1
- Silkkaa pornoa (2001, Productions 69)
- Rakel Liekki: Mun leffa (2002, Productions 69)
- The Best of ELS (ELS production)
- Haluatko pornotähdeksi
- Haluatko pornotähdeksi 2 (2005, Turun Exhibition oy)

== Partial television history ==
- Pornostara (2001)
- Kuutamolla (1 episode, 2003)
- Jaajon jacuzzi (1 episode, 2003)
- 4Pop (1 episode, 2003)
- Persona non grata (1 episode, 2003)
- Escort (1 episode, 2003)
- W-tyyli (1 episode, 2004)
- Toni Wirtanen Undercover (1 episode, 2004)
- Harakanpesä (1 episode, 2004)
- Suoraa huutoa! (1 episode, 2004)
- Hyppönen Enbuske Experience (1 episode, 2004)
- Taistelevat julkkikset (1 episode, 2004)
- Uutisvuoto (1 episode, 2007, 2013)
- Popkult (2 episodes, 2008–2009)
