= Wild Wild Wonderland =

Studio album by Saara Aalto
- Released: 27 April 2018
- Genre: Pop, dance-pop
- Length: 42:31
- Label: Warner
- Producer: Saara Aalto (exec.); The Family; Arto Ruotsala; Carl Ryden; CASGAS; MGI; Xenomania; Commands; Marta Grauers; Thomas G:son; Johnny Sanchez; Will Taylor; Utters; Tommi Vainikainen; Riku Kantola; Teemu Roivainen; Matias Keskiruokanen

Saara Aalto chronology
| Tonight (2015) | Wild Wild Wonderland (2018) | Fairytale – Joulun taikaa (2019) |

Singles from Wild Wild Wonderland
- 1. "Monsters" Released: 9 February 2018; 2. "Domino" Released: 16 February 2018; 3. "Queens" Released: 23 February 2018; 4. "DANCE!!!" Released: 19 June 2018; 5. "Dance Like Nobody's Watching" Released: 1 February 2019

Wild Wild Wonderland is the sixth studio album and the major-label international debut studio album from the Finnish singer Saara Aalto, released under Warner Music. The album was released on 27 April 2018, prior to Aalto's participation in the Eurovision Song Contest 2018.

== Track listing ==
| No. | Title | Writer(s) | Producer(s) | Length |
|---|---|---|---|---|
| 1. | "Monsters" | Saara Aalto; Joy Deb; Linnea Deb; Ki McPhail | The Family | 3:02 |
| 2. | "HÄN" | Aalto; J. Deb; L. Deb | The Family | 2:58 |
| 3. | "DANCE!!!" | Aalto; L. Deb; Matias Keskiruokanen | The Family | 3:17 |
| 4. | "Queens" | Aalto; Thomas Dutton; Farley Arvidsson; Charlie Walshe | Arto Ruotsala | 3:05 |
| 5. | "Half a Heart" | Aalto; Lasse Kurki; Shane Stevens; Keskiruokanen | Ruotsala | 3:02 |
| 6. | "Dance Like Nobody's Watching" | Aalto; David Sneddon; Thomas AD Fuller | Ruotsala | 3:53 |
| 7. | "Sirens" | Aalto; Richard Stannard; Emma Rohan; Carl Ryden | Ryden | 3:35 |
| 8. | "Don't Deny Our Love" | Aalto; Axel Ehnström; Keskiruokanen | CASGAS; MGI | 3:08 |
| 9. | "My Touch" | Aalto; Brian Higgins; Benjamin Taylor; Timothy Deal; Georgia Morgan; Lauren Morgan; Sarah Thompson; Keir MacCulloch; Kyle Mackenzie; Kristoffer Ryeland; Judie Myers; Michael Paxman; Paul Muggleton | Xenomania; Commands | 3:47 |
| 10. | "Walking on Nails" | Aalto; Eric Bazilian; Märta Grauers; Kalvin Ryder | Märta Grauers | 3:25 |
| 11. | "Domino" | Aalto; Thomas Gustafsson; Bobby Ljunggren; Jonathan Sanchez; Will Taylor | Thomas G:son; Johnny Sanchez | 3:02 |
| 12. | "Wild Wild Wonderland" | Aalto; Daniel "Utters" Radclyffe; Olivia Sebastianelli | Utters | 3:14 |
| 13. | "No Fear" (bonus track) | Aalto; Teemu Roivainen | Tommi Vainikainen; Riku Kantola; Roivainen; Keskiruokanen | 3:03 |

== Charts ==
| Chart (2018) | Peak position |
|---|---|
| Finnish Albums (Suomen virallinen lista) | 2 |
