= Eeli Aalto =

Finnish painter and television director

Eeli Alvar Aalto
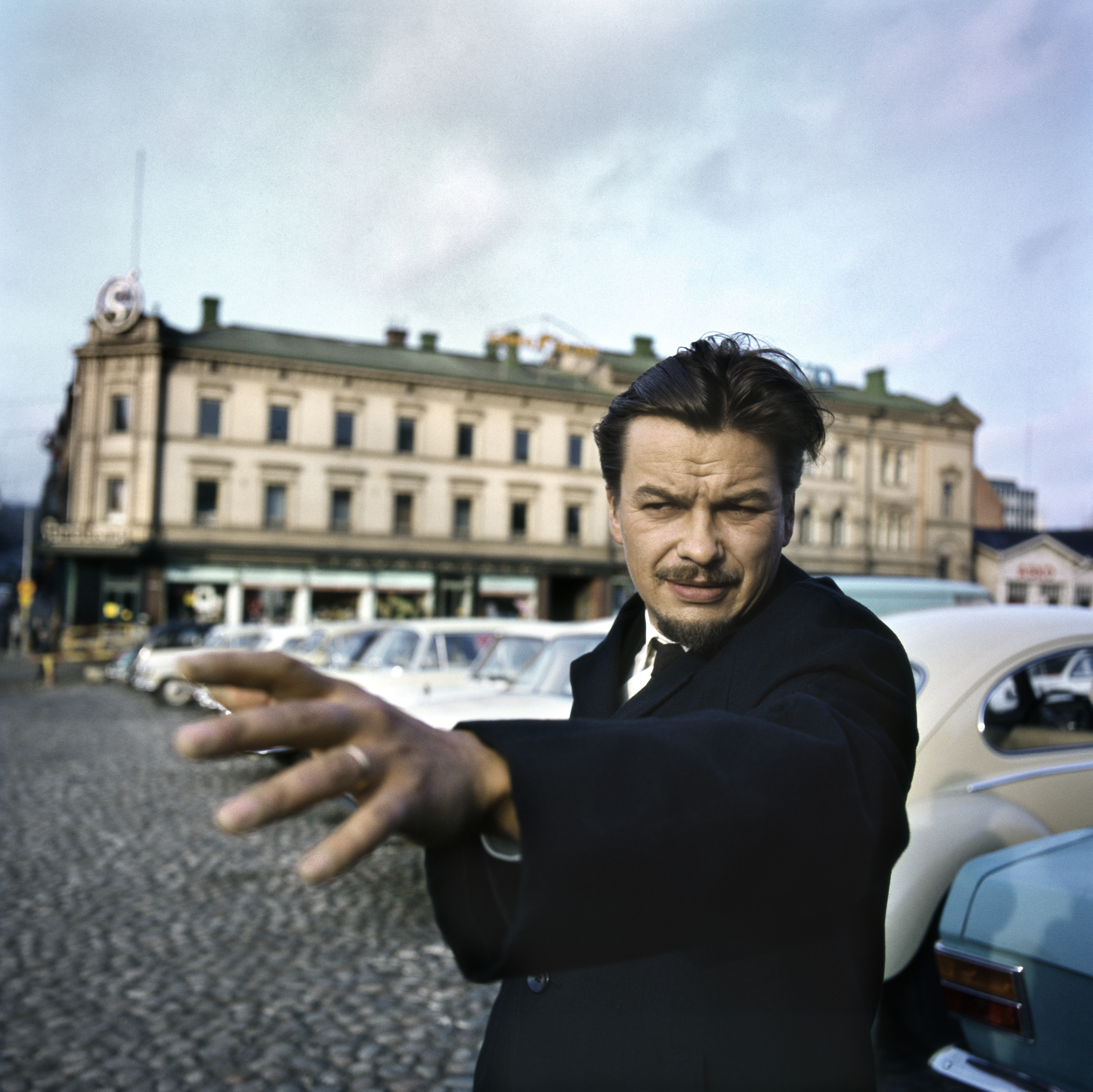
- Eeli Aalto at the Keskustori square in Tampere in 1967.
- Born: February 6, 1931 (age 95); Vyborg, Finland (present-day Russia)
- Education: Academy of Fine Arts, Helsinki
- Occupations: visual artist, television director
- Years active: 1950s–present

Eeli Alvar Aalto (born 6 February 1931 in Viipuri, Finland, present-day Vyborg, Russia) is a Finnish visual artist and television director.

== Youth ==
During the Winter War, Eeli Aalto and his parents fled the war to the Pohjois-Pohjanmaa region, first to Liminka and then to Oulu. Eeli Aalto became acquainted with art at the age of 10 when he saw paintings by the Liminka-based artist Vilho Lampi.

== Career ==
=== Painting and other visual arts ===
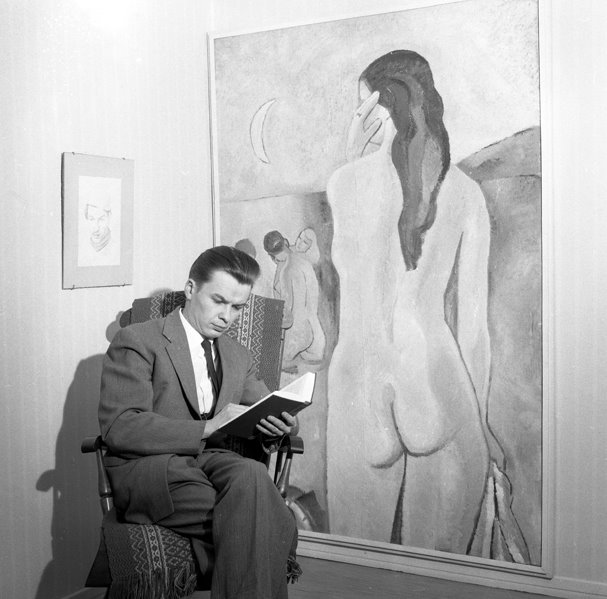
Aalto in 1960

Aalto studied art at the Academy of Fine Arts in Helsinki and later in Paris, France at the André Lhote academy.

Aalto participated in the frescoes by Lennart Segerstråle at the Rovaniemi Church. He painted landscapes and city scenarios. In the 1960s Aalto also experimented in abstract art. He designed a large three-part relief ("In the beginning there was the word. The word became flesh ... and lived among us", 1969) between the main entrances at the concrete facade of the Alava Church in Kuopio. In Oulu he participated in getting cultural facilities such as the Oulu University and the Oulu Museum of Art into the city. From 1962 to 1979 Aalto served as teacher of plastic composition at the department of architecture at the Oulu University.

From 1993 to 1998 Aalto painted the series "Sata kuvaa Oulusta" ("One hundred pictures of Oulu"). Eeli Aalto wrote of its birth: "We got refuge in Oulu. Why shouldn't I picture the city that accepted us?" The idea was for every picture to have its own personal meaning. Eeli Aalto used his realistic pictures to show that figurative art had never disappeared anywhere. According to Giorgio Morandi "nothing is as abstract as reality".

=== Television documents ===
In addition to paintings and sculptures, Aalto made numerous television documents for Yleisradio, such as a document about star singers called Synti suuri surkia in 1980. The document Piina about the artist Alpo Jaakola (1977) was awarded the Jussi Award for best television film.

After the dissolution of the Soviet Union Eeli Aalto travelled to his home city of Vyborg in 1991. He said that seeing the city after half a century first felt like descending to a nightmare. "I felt a foreigner, but so did the Russian inhabitants." Eeli Aalto made a documentary film Wiipurini (1992) based on his trip to Vyborg.

Eeli Aalto also made a series of writings and photographs called Viipurinmatka based on his trip, which he also published online in his series "100 kuvaa Oulusta".

==== Television essayist ====
Jukka Lindfors describes Eeli Aalto's films as personal statements, a kind of television essays or pontifications. "They are often poetic and nostalgic, but they also have quite a lot of fresh humour, acridity and black satire."

According to Lindfors Eeli Aalto's artist documents give away an air of understanding reaching beyond the surface, and each subject is also reflected in the filming and editing of the films. His subjects have often been peculiar marginal characters, creative outsiders. Aalto often also appears in his films himself, sometimes as a fictive character.

=== Literature and other works ===
Aalto has written two books about artists, of which one is about Vilho Lampi (1969) and the other about Reidar Särestöniemi (1976).

From 1983 to 1988 Eeli Aalto wrote columns in the newspaper Kaleva under the title "Pienet filosofiat". Aalto wrote about four hundred columns and also illustrated them.

Aalto's autobiography Kuviensa takana was published in 2016. It was also published in English (2018) and in Russian accompanied with an article by Anastasia Martynova who had studied Eeli Aalto's works in 2019.

Eeli Aalto was also witness to the Jumalan teatteri act in Oulu in 1987, where the actors threw urine and excrement on the audience. Aalto was the only member of the audience who watched the act in its entirety and took photographs, which were later used as evidence in a trial against the actors. In February 2009 Aalto published photographs of the act on the Internet, which had never been shown before.

== Private life ==
Aalto lives in Kempele. Aalto's son Simo Aalto is known as a magician, Aalto's grandchildren Saara and Suvi Aalto are singers and Sari Aalto is a ventriloquist.

== Awards and recognition ==
Eeli Aalto was awarded an artist's pension in 1994.

In 2012 Aalto was awarded the Kultainen kaulin ("Golden rolling pin") award for a culturally significant Oulu citizen.

== Bibliography ==
- Aalto, Eeli: Vilho lampi - Lakeuden maalari, Karisto 1969.
- Aalto, Eeli: Reidar Särestöniemi, WSOY 1976. ISBN 9510076856.
- Aalto, Eeli: Kuviensa takana, Books on Demand 2016. ISBN 9789523303096.
- Aalto, Eeli: Behind his Pictures, Books on Demand 2018. ISBN 978-952-80-0685-5 (in English).
- Aalto, Eeli: Za yego kartinami, Books on Demand 2019. ISBN 978-952-339-258-8 (in Russian).

== Television programs ==
- 1966: Vilho Lampi – Lakeuden maalari; Kaupunki
- 1967: Viimeinen tuomio; Eräs Im Memoriam; Haikara lensi ohi; Hiljaisen miehen maailma
- 1968: Kuin kamee; Taulu; Lastentaidetta
- 1969: Hei hei, tämä on totta; 36 000 päivää Oulussa; Elukka
- 1970: Röijy
- 1971: Hailuoto, hyvän haltijan saari; Myrrysmies; Kain tapper; Unelma paremmasta elämästä; C-G Lilius
- 1972: Euroopan mestari; Afrikkalainen keskustelu
- 1973: Reidarin värilliset aistimukse; Taakkasi on minun
- 1974: Tyttökauppias
- 1975: Maalaismaisema; Iso pieni tyttö, Anu Pentik
- 1977: Kauko Rantalan mustavalkea maailma; Reima Pietilä; Piina
- 1978: Anna-Leenan jouluaatto
- 1978: Tuhlaajapojan paluu; Anna-Leenan jouluaatto
- 1979: Aurinkogalleria
- 1980: Kerro kerro kuvasti – 6 osaa kuvataiteesta; Synti suuri surkia
- 1981: Erämaakoira; Paluu Ithakaan; Merkillinen matkakertomus
- 1982: Häät Kempeleen kirkossa; Mielipiteitä taidekasvatuksesta
- 1983: Kissa vieköön; Dostojevskin galleria; Lentäjä Non Grata
- 1984: Rakentamisen draama; Kirstinän runot heräävät; Oulu -10
- 1985: Muistojeni albumi; Budapest-Rock; Mauno Haartman; Juhani Pallasmaa; Keijo Petäjä
- 1986: Vuosisadan talvi; Oulun koulu; Yksin; Elämän äänet; Jouni Kesti; Oulun horisontista; Satu Huttunen – Vuoden nainen; Kesäyön oikkuja
- 1987: Kirkkokatu 50; Punaiset kengät Sodankylässä; Tuhlaajapojan päiväkirja; Kirje maailman katolta; Paskajuttu
- 1988: Kadonnutta tietoa etsimässä; Taiteen tähden – Veijo Hukka; Itsemurhat; Jorma Uotinen; Erotiikkaa etsimässä; Huippukokous mummolassa; Valmentajan muotokuva; Picasso Tukholmassa; Giorgio Morandi; Matti satujen talossa
- 1989: Tekstiilin intiimi kosketus; Edvard Much; Simosalabim (5 parts) 1989; Passikuva (4 parts); Tapaaminen Oulussa, Paavo Rintala; Uusikatu 1989
- 1992: Helene Schjerfbeck Ateneumissa; Alberto Giacometti; Wiipurini; Tuhlaajapoika ja Sokrates
- 1992–1994: Jokeri pokeri box (32 parts)
