= Jumalan teatteri =

Finnish group of actors

Jumalan teatteri (Finnish for "the theatre of God") was a Finnish avant-garde, radicalist group of student actors from the Helsinki Theatre Academy. The group was composed of Esa Kirkkopelto and Jari Halonen, now directors, and Jorma Tommila and Jari Hietanen, now actors. Jumalan teatteri is best remembered for their experimental act at the Oulu City Theatre in 1987, where the group used fire extinguishers, raw eggs, whips, excrement, and fireworks to drive out all but one member of the audience. Police arrested the performers, and it became an internationally known scandal.

== Oulu Theatre Days scandal ==
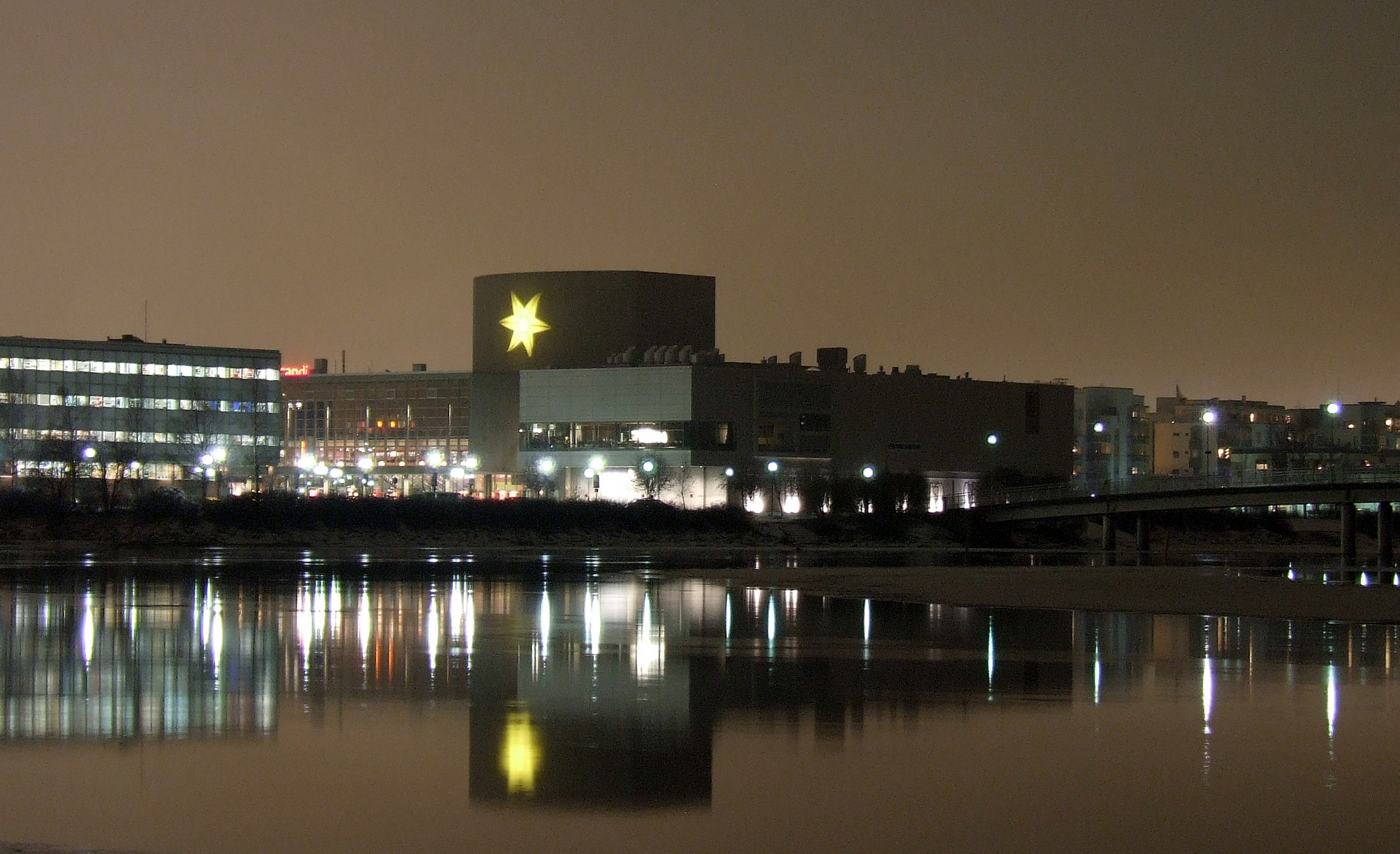
The Oulu City Theatre

An actor, completely nude, whips empty seats at the Oulu City Theatre. Photograph by Eeli Aalto.

An actor sprays a fire extinguisher while two members of the audience flee the scene. Photograph by Eeli Aalto.

=== Course of the events ===
Jumalan teatteri performed at the Oulu City Theatre on 17 January 1987. The four students from the Helsinki Theatre Academy had announced in the Kaleva newspaper that their performance would be "a manifesto of what theatre can now be and what it can not be" at a seminar at the Northern Theatre Days.

The students performed in the nude and wielded fire extinguishers, stolen from the VR Group railway company. They sprayed the dry powder fire extinguishers around the theatre hall and at people in the audience. The performers also whipped members of the audience and threw excrement, chicken eggs and yoghurt onto them. The group also set off firecrackers in the hall. The public fled as the automatic fire extinguishing system activated. First responders arrived on the scene, and some individuals who had been in the audience were taken to the hospital for treatment of respiratory damage caused by the explosive gases released from the firecrackers. After Jumalan teatteri's two-minute act, the actors fled into the city and were arrested by the police.

Eeli Aalto, the grandfather of Finnish singer Saara Aalto, was the only member of the audience who remained for the duration of the performance. The performers removed his sweater and attempted to remove his trousers. When he resisted, they left him in peace. Aalto took the only known photographs of the event.

=== Reaction from the Theatre Academy ===
At the time, the press could not be present to hear the members of the group, so the inspiration of the act was subject to investigation. Many people thought the inspiration came from Jouko Turkka and his methods of teaching, which had also been the subject of public debate before the Oulu act.

Acting principal of the Theatre Academy Marianne Möller thought the inspiration was the need for publicity of the "young theatre kids". The management of the academy as well as most of the teachers distanced themselves from the production, citing the students had done it on their private time.

On the other hand, professor of directing Jouko Turkka from the Theatre Academy and acting teacher of dramaturgy Jussi Parviainen sided themselves with the theatre group, although they claimed they had not known of the act beforehand. This brought public attention to the arguments at the academy. Jouko Turkka said he would "tip his hat to the boys" and "support his dear students".

Around ten students of the Theatre Academy formed an "open student body" supporting Jumalan teatteri in early February, demanding that Jussi Parviainen be appointed the new principal and that Marianne Möller, professor of acting work Ritva Valkama and teacher Erkki Saarela be expelled from the academy. A few days later, eight members of the "open student body" caused a scene at the premises of the Theatre Academy in Eira, Helsinki by breaking windows and throwing things out into the snow. At the same time, the members of the theatre group chained themselves into the front doors of the academy.

=== Political controversy ===
The performance of the group caused a huge scandal. Minister of Culture Gustav Björkstrand wanted to expel Turkka and Parviainen from their offices. At the Parliament of Finland, there even was discussion about closing the Theatre Academy down. The right wing demanded tough action and the left wing warned about the dangers of a lynching mentality. In a question to Björkstrand, Christian Democrat parliament member Esko Almgren asked "What is the government going to do to immediately stop the tax-funded activity by Jouko Turkka, Jussi Parviainen and the Theatre Academy aimed at anarchism and terror, damaging the art of the theatre?" In late January 1987 the government of Finland announced they would appoint a task force led by chancellor of the Ministry of the Environment Lauri Tarasti to investigate the internal problems at the Theatre Academy.

=== Reaction from the press ===
The reaction from the politicians also awakened the academic and cultural circles in Finland. Theatre critic Juha-Pekka Hotinen wrote a debate article at the newspaper Helsingin Sanomat claiming that "the purpose of the act was to investigate the fuzzy consensus community and its use of power". Hotinen claimed the Jumalan teatteri group had succeeded in this. According to Hotinen, the control structure of the community had been bared for a brief moment. According to Hotinen, a scandal using aesthetics performed in a quick fashion resembled terrorism. In considering the Jumalan teatteri act as a rebellion by the young theatre generation, Hotinen compared it to the Lapualaisooppera act of 1966 and to the play Pete Q of 1978. He claimed the press had inflated the significance of Jumalan teatteri "in an absurd manner", because he thought this had not been an unprecedented act in the theatre circles: "History knows of many attacks to the public, even as far as ritual suicides by artists. -- This does not negate that the act was repulsive in many fashions."

Professor Jouko Turkka, a teacher at the Theatre Academy, said in an interview by Helsingin Sanomat that real terrorism would not start at a theatre, but individual acts of terrorism would be possible in a Finland consisting of a casino economy, yuppie culture and postmodernism.

Only Hufvudstadsbladet reviewed the act as a performance on its own right and separated the reaction caused by the act from the act itself. Uusi Suomi and Iltalehti were the harshest in judging Jumalan teatteri. Jyrki Vesikansa, editor at Uusi Suomi published a column titled "Milloin ruumiita?" ("When will heads roll?") underneath the editorial, demanding that the Minister of Culture act against the "Turkkaesque" theaterical education. Discussion about Jumalan teatteri quieted down from late February to early March, but awakened fresh at the start of the trial in early September.

Kari Suomalainen, the editorial cartoonist at Helsingin Sanomat, commented on the issue with a cartoon where two men were discussing on the street: "Arvaa, mikä yhden kirjaimen ero on tasa-arvovaltuutetulla ja nykyteatterilla?" - "En tiedä." - "Toinen on Nikula ja toinen nakula!" ("Can you guess what is the one-letter difference between the equality officer and modern theatre?" - "No." - "One is Nikula and the other is a house of nudity!")

Author Matti Mäkelä has analysed the scandal in his 2016 essay collection Tämä ei ole taidetta ("This is not art"). According to Mäkelä, the Jumalan teatteri case was handled amazingly fast and superficially. This was because of many reasons: Yleisradio had not yet learned to handle provocation as news, the press had diminished and the Internet had not yet changed the structure of publicity. According to Mäkelä, the performers of Jumalan teatteri had behaved seriously badly.

=== Jari Halonen's later view ===
Jari Halonen told in 2016 in the Perjantai show on Yleisradio:

Firstly, the situation at the time was that one really did not dare attack the hegemony in charge, it was a completely different situation than today, now anyone who is able to is shouting something against something, they were not doing that at that time, it was one big hegemony, it was a specific problem, that's why we did it so roughly, because we saw that the entire art is... the entertainment industry is taking art underneath it, and it has happened, we prophesied correctly, that is we thought that we must do something, we talked about it the whole time, and some people talked about it, for example Turkka talked about it the whole time, but the hegemony, the artistic circles, they didn't care about it... the same circles went along with the entertainment industry, so we young theatre students decided to sacrifice something of our own, we knew we would get our butts kicked, we didn't do anything dangerous, we didn't do anything like that, but we did invent the best thing, the next thing would have to explode bombs, but we didn't want to hurt anyone, so we thought that heck, the best thing we could do to cause a big scandal would be to take some shit, and it was a huge scandal, it caused a big problem, nothing really happened there, but they told us the people were traumatised there, it was a joke to read about those people, when years ago when there was some actor who was supposed to be an artist, or brave, or a director, told at a police interrogation "when I got shit thrown on me there... and there was something on my coat, I didn't understand... after that I spent half a year on sick leave..." This kind of artist, I would say, there was nothing to joke about, we got our butts kicked, but it was our process of maturing as artists, the first idea of an artist is only to be brave enough to dare to do something, but I think today the bravest thing in art is what is in love that leaves something undone, today people like Veronika Honkasalo and people like that, they are as provocative as they can be, but that they would dare to be in love, I don't dare yet, but I am trying hard.

=== Jussi Parvianen's later view ===
Jussi Parviainen told at a 2017 event by the Oulu Merikoskikerho club along with former cultural reporter Kaisu Mikkola that Jumalan teatteri had had nothing to do with theatre. It was an act of terror. Hatred and need for attention. There was no other explanation.

According to chief criminal inspector Kari Myllyniemi who had led the investigation Turkka had acted cowardly in denying that he had publicly mentioned anything positive about Jumalan teatteri when he was interrogated by the police. According to Parviainen, the final destruction of the Theatre Academy started from Turkka's exact words. It gave birth to Pirun teatteri ("the theatre of the devil") that had destroyed the academy. According to Parviainen, it was unforgivable that many students at the Theatre Academy were left without education and training in their profession after Jumalan teatteri. Many dropped out of the academy. The academy continued its provocations in Helsinki. Students calling themselves Pirun teatteri caused a scene at the academy. Many students were afraid. Parviainen recalled that it was a terrible time and the academy had collapsed under itself.

Parviainen affirmed that there was controversy about Turkka's "malaria theatre" and the media had turned against it. In this situation the students wanted to defend the academy. According to Parviainen, the Theatre Academy had a lot of good in it and its destruction was a loss to many gifted students, who also studied intensively and wanted to continue their studies completely separate from Jumalan teatteri and its provocative activity.

Today, if people would throw explosives and shit on the public and the police would be there, those guys would not leave the scene alive.
Jussi Parviainen at a Radio Rock interview on 13 March 2018

== Court process against Jumalan teatteri ==
Two days after the act about ten people at the Theatre Days reported the group to the police and the Oulu police department started investigating the case. The Helsinki criminal police interrogated Jouko Turkka and Jussi Parviainen about their possible involvement in the case.

The process started at the Oulu district court in early September. The Oulu city official acting as the prosecutor demanded punishment for the group for theft, fraud and continued crimes where explosives were used to endanger people's lives and health, and for continued insult, continued assault and damages. The actors plead guilty to almost all of the charges. The prosecutor had also planned to charge the group for blasphemy, but dropped the charge because of the negative point of view of archbishop John Vikström. One of the accused was assisted by famous lawyer Matti Wuori, who thought that a criminal evaluation of the case should be based on the fact that the audience at the act had been professionals at the Theatre Days, who should have been prepared for a different kind of performance, and not an "unsuspecting Sunday audience who had come to see Moominpappa, but instead ended up in the middle of even symbolically unpleasant phenomena of life".

== Consequences ==
The members of the group were expelled from the Theatre Academy for a year, and were sentenced to seven months in prison with parole, fines of 17 thousand markka and to pay 40 thousand markka worth of compensation mostly for hospital and cleaning charges. They accepted the sentence given by the court and served their sentence at a labour camp.

The members of the group who had demonstrated in favour of Jumalan teatteri and had broken things at the Theatre Academy were also expelled from the academy and sentenced to short prison sentences with parole. The most famous former member of this so-called "Pirun teatteri" group was the journalist and, until 2023, Minister of Traffic and Communications Timo Harakka.

The case led to the expulsion of the principal of the Theatre Academy Outi Nyytäjä and three teachers.

== Sources ==
- Arminen, Ilkka: Juhannustansseista Jumalan teatteriin. Publications of the Association of Researchers #58. Helsinki, 1989. ISBN 951-9297-72-3.
- Mitä-missä-milloin 1988. Otava, 1987. ISBN 951-1-09685-0
- Mitä-missä-milloin 1989. Otava, 1988. ISBN 951-1-10120-X
- Image magazine #3/2003
- Jari Halonen, Jumalan teatteri, YLE.
- Jumalan teatteri tänään, YLE.

== Bibliography ==
- Seppänen, Janne: Tehtävä Oulussa: Tutkintoja Jumalan teatterin avantgardesta. Tampere University Press 1995. ISBN 951-44-3769-1
