= Queens (song) =

Single by Saara Aalto

from the album Wild Wild Wonderland
- Released: 22 February 2018
- Genre: Pop
- Length: 3:03
- Label: Warner Music Finland
- Songwriters: Saara Aalto; Thomas Dutton; Farley Arvidsson; Charlie Walshe
- Producer: Arto Ruotsala

Saara Aalto singles chronology
"Domino" (2018)	"Queens" (2018)	"DANCE!!!" (2018)

"Queens" is a song performed by Finnish singer-songwriter Saara Aalto. It was released to digital retailers and streaming platforms on 22 February 2018 by Warner Music Finland. It was the third and final song released by Aalto to compete in Uuden Musiikin Kilpailu 2018, the Finnish national selection for the Eurovision Song Contest 2018, but was not selected in favour of "Monsters". It was later included on Aalto's major-label international debut studio album, Wild Wild Wonderland.

== Eurovision Song Contest ==
In November 2017, at a press conference for Uuden Musiikin Kilpailu 2018, it was announced that Saara Aalto would represent Finland at the Eurovision Song Contest 2018 and her song would be selected through Uuden Musiikin Kilpailu 2018. The competition featured three songs, with all three competing entries being performed by Aalto. The show took place on 3 March 2018 at Espoo Metro Areena in Espoo, hosted by Krista Siegfrids and Mikko Silvennoinen. The winning song was determined by public voting and the votes from international jury panels. "Queens" finished third scoring 138 points.

== Track listing ==
Digital single
No.	Title	Length
1.	"Queens"	3:03

== Charts ==
Chart (2018)	Peak position
Finland Airplay (Radiosoittolista)	12

== Release history ==
Region	Date	Format	Label
Various	22 February 2018	Digital download; streaming	Warner Music Finland
