= Domino (Saara Aalto song) =

Single by Saara Aalto

from the album Wild Wild Wonderland
- Released: 16 February 2018
- Genre: Pop
- Length: 3:00
- Label: Warner Music Finland
- Songwriters: Saara Aalto; Thomas Gustafsson; Bobby Ljunggren; Jonathan Sanchez; Will Taylor
- Producers: Thomas G:son; Johnny Sanchez; Will Taylor

Saara Aalto singles chronology
"Monsters" (2018)	"Domino" (2018)	"Queens" (2018)

"Domino" is a song performed by Finnish singer-songwriter Saara Aalto. It was released to digital retailers and streaming platforms on 16 February 2018 by Warner Music Finland. It was the second of three songs released by Aalto to compete in Uuden Musiikin Kilpailu 2018, the Finnish national selection for the Eurovision Song Contest 2018, but was not selected in favour of "Monsters". It was later included on Aalto's major-label international debut studio album, Wild Wild Wonderland.

== Eurovision Song Contest ==
In November 2017, at a press conference for Uuden Musiikin Kilpailu 2018, it was announced that Saara Aalto will represent Finland at the Eurovision Song Contest 2018 and her song will be selected through Uuden Musiikin Kilpailu 2018. The competition will feature three songs, all three competing entries will be performed by Aalto. The show took take place on 3 March 2018 at Espoo Metro Areena in Espoo, hosted by Krista Siegfrids and Mikko Silvennoinen. The winning song was determined by public voting and the votes from international jury panels. "Domino" finished second scoring 159 points.

== Track listing ==
Digital single
No.	Title	Length
1.	"Domino"	3:00

== Charts ==
Chart (2018)	Peak position
Finland Airplay (Radiosoittolista)	18

== Release history ==
Region	Date	Format	Label
Various	16 February 2018	Digital download; streaming	Warner Music Finland
