= Monsters (Saara Aalto song) =

2018 single by Saara Aalto

Single by Saara Aalto

from the album Wild Wild Wonderland
- Released: 9 February 2018
- Genre: Pop
- Length: 3:00
- Label: Warner Music Finland
- Songwriters: Saara Aalto; Joy Deb; Linnea Deb; Ki Fitzgerald
- Producer: The Family

Saara Aalto singles chronology
"No Fear" (2016)	"Monsters" (2018)	"Domino" (2018)

Music video
- "Monsters" on YouTube

Eurovision Song Contest 2018 entry
- Country: Finland
- Artist: Saara Aalto
- Language: English
- Composers: Saara Aalto; Joy Deb; Linnea Deb; Ki Fitzgerald
- Lyricists: Saara Aalto; Joy Deb; Linnea Deb; Ki Fitzgerald

Finals performance
- Semi-final result: 10th
- Semi-final points: 108
- Final result: 25th
- Final points: 46

Entry chronology
- ◄ "Blackbird" (2017)
- "Look Away" (2019) ►

"Monsters" is a song performed by Finnish singer-songwriter Saara Aalto. It was released to digital retailers and streaming platforms on 9 February 2018 by Warner Music Finland. The song was written by Aalto, Joy Deb, Linnea Deb and Ki Fitzgerald, and is about befriending one's enemies. It represented Finland in the Eurovision Song Contest 2018.

It was the first of three songs released by Aalto to compete in Uuden Musiikin Kilpailu 2018, the Finnish national selection for the Eurovision Song Contest 2018, winning the competition and subsequently being selected to represent Finland in the contest. It was later included on Aalto's major-label international debut studio album, Wild Wild Wonderland.

== Eurovision Song Contest ==
In November 2017, at a press conference for Uuden Musiikin Kilpailu 2018, it was announced that Saara Aalto would represent Finland at the Eurovision Song Contest 2018 and that her song would be selected through Uuden Musiikin Kilpailu 2018. The competition featured three songs that were all performed by Aalto. The show took place on 3 March 2018 at Espoo Metro Areena in Espoo, hosted by Krista Siegfrids and Mikko Silvennoinen. The winning song was determined by public voting and by votes from international jury panels. The song later finished 25th in the Eurovision Song Contest.

== Track listing ==
Digital single
No.	Title	Length
1.	"Monsters"	3:00

Remixes EP
No.	Title	Length
1.	"Monsters" (Initial Talk Remix)	3:29
2.	"Monsters" (Cutmore Remix)	4:09
3.	"Monsters" (Extended Version)	4:24
4.	"Monsters" (Cutmore Radio Edit)	3:09

Twilight Version digital single
No.	Title	Length
1.	"Monsters" (Twilight Version)	3:21

== Charts ==
Chart (2018)	Peak position
Finland (Suomen virallinen lista)	13
Iceland (RÚV)	19
Sweden Heatseeker (Sverigetopplistan)	7

== Release history ==
Region	Date	Format	Version	Label
Various	9 February 2018	Digital download; streaming	Original	Warner Music Finland
Various	20 April 2018	Digital download; streaming	Remixes EP	Warner Music Finland
Various	26 April 2018	Digital download; streaming	Twilight Version	Warner Music Finland
