= You Had My Heart =

Studio album by Saara Aalto
- Released: 24 May 2013
- Recorded: 2013
- Genre: Pop
- Length: 45:44
- Label: Yume Records
- Producer: Teemu Roivainen

Saara Aalto chronology
Enkeleitä – Angels (2011)	You Had My Heart (2013)	Ai De Zhu Fu (2013)

Singles from You Had My Heart
- 1. "You Had My Heart" Released: 22 March 2013

You Had My Heart is the third studio album by Finnish singer-songwriter Saara Aalto. It was released on 24 May 2013 by Yume Records. It peaked at number 43 on the Finnish Albums Chart. The album was produced by Teemu Roivainen.

== Singles ==
"You Had My Heart" was released as the lead single from the album on 22 March 2013. The music video for the song was uploaded to YouTube on 23 March 2013 at a total length of four minutes and twenty-eight seconds, the video was directed by Marko Mäkilaakso.

== Track listing ==
No.	Title	Writer(s)	Length
1.	"Intro – Life Reborn"	Saara Aalto; Riku Kantola	1:38
2.	"You Had My Heart"	Aalto; Teemu Roivainen	4:19
3.	"Walk You Through"	Aalto	3:33
4.	"You Gotta Go"	Aalto	4:03
5.	"Higher"	Aalto; Roivainen	4:05
6.	"My Bird"	Aalto; Roivainen	4:42
7.	"Can I Keep the Pictures?" (2013 Version)	Aalto	5:35
8.	"10 O'Clock"	Aalto	3:28
9.	"My Love" (2013 Version)	Aalto; Roivainen	5:04
10.	"Without You"	Aalto	4:30
11.	"Je suis malade"	Serge Lama; Alice Dona	4:56

== Charts ==
=== Weekly charts ===
Chart (2013)	Peak position
Finnish Albums (Suomen virallinen lista)	43

== Release history ==
Region	Date	Format	Label
Finland	24 May 2013	Digital download	Yume Records
