= Will Taylor (music producer) =

- Born: 1991 (age 34–35); Leicester, England
- Genres: Pop
- Occupations: Songwriter, producer
- Years active: 2014-present
- Website: highkey-music.com

Will Taylor is a British songwriter, composer and music producer based in Leicester, England. He studied Music Production and Creative Recording at the University of Brighton, and has gone on to work with platinum-selling artists and songwriters. In recent years, he has found chart and radio success across Europe, including a top 20 single with Finnish artist Saara Aalto, and a number one album in Russia with Sergey Lazarev. Other credits include numerous entries into national competitions for the Eurovision Song Contest.

== Entries in the Junior Eurovision Song Contest ==
- "Señorita" by Carlos Higes, Spain, (Junior Eurovision Song Contest 2022), 6th place

== Eurovision pre-selections discography ==
2015

- "Supernova" by Janet (Belarus 2015), 14th
- "Alive" by Alen Hit (Belarus 2015), eliminated
- "Unshakable" by Anewta C (Moldova 2015), eliminated

2016

- "Fire Burn" by Dominic (Malta 2016), 13th
- "Overload" by Viktoria Petryk (Ukraine 2016), 7th (semi-final)
- "Survivors" by Deividas Žygas (Lithuania 2016), 12th (quarter-final)
- "Take Me Far" by Omar Naber (Switzerland 2016), eliminated
- "Never Let Go" by Anna Gulko (Moldova 2016), 12th (semi-final)
- "Superhuman" by Xandra (Romania 2016), 10th (semi-final)

2017

- "Hypnotised" by Aron Brink (Iceland 2017), 4th
- "Walk On By" by Xandra (Romania 2017), 5th
- "Sacrifice" by Mia (Lithuania 2017), 5th (quarter-final)
- (Georgia (country)) "Fighter" by Elene Mikiashvili (Georgia 2017), 14th

2018

- "Domino" by Saara Aalto (Finland 2018), 2nd
- "Try" by Xandra (Romania 2018), 9th
- "Heaven" by Mihai Trăistariu (Romania 2018), 7th
- "Somebody To Love" by Manuel Chivari (Romania 2018), 7th (semi-final)
- "Thinking About You" by Endless feat. Maria Grosu (Romania 2018), 6th (semi-final)
- "Chasing Rushes" by NAPOLI (Belarus 2018), 4th
- "Powerful" by Donata (Lithuania 2018), 12th (quarter-final)
- "Alien" by Felicia Dunaf (Moldova 2018), 8th

2019

- "I Will Not Surrender" by Maxim Zavidia (Moldova 2019), 2nd
- "Weight Of The World" by Nicola (Romania 2019), 7th (semi-final)
- "Underground" by Vaida (Romania 2019), 6th
- "Ja Sam Ti San" by Andrea Demirović (Montenegro 2019), 3rd

2020

- "Don't Let Me Down" by NAPOLI (Belarus 2020), 9th

2022

- "Do svidaniya" by ARIS (Romania 2022), eliminated (semi-final)
- "Washing Machine" by Queens of Roses (Lithuania 2022), 8th

2023

- "Whatever Wind May Blow" by Dominic Cini & Anna Azzopardi (Malta 2023), eliminated (semi-final)
- "Haunted" by Lyndsay (Malta 2023), eliminated (quarter-final)
- "Love Again" by Skrellex (Norway 2023), 7th

2025

- "Frelsið Mitt"/"Set Me Free" by Stebbi Jak (Iceland 2025), 2nd

2026

- "Into the Wild" by Skrellex (Norway 2026), 7th

== Production and writing credits ==
"You Did It"	Kaia
"My Body"	Nada
"張杰-夢想新大陸主題曲"	Jason Zhang
"Take A Hike"	Jiyeon
"Baya (Speechless)"	Mihai Trăistariu
"Going Under"	Sergey Lazarev
"Deep Blue"	Sergey Lazarev
"Not Worth It Anymore"	Sergey Lazarev
"You On Me"	Carina Dahl
"The Whole World"	Litesound
"Stand"	Adrian Aron
"My Heart Is Broken"	Alen Hit
"Speechless"	Waldo Greeff
"Llegara"	Yeyo
"I Want Your Love"	La Pelopony
"Desastres De Un Capitulo Final"	La Pelopony
