= Jouko Turkka =

Finnish theatre director and controversialist

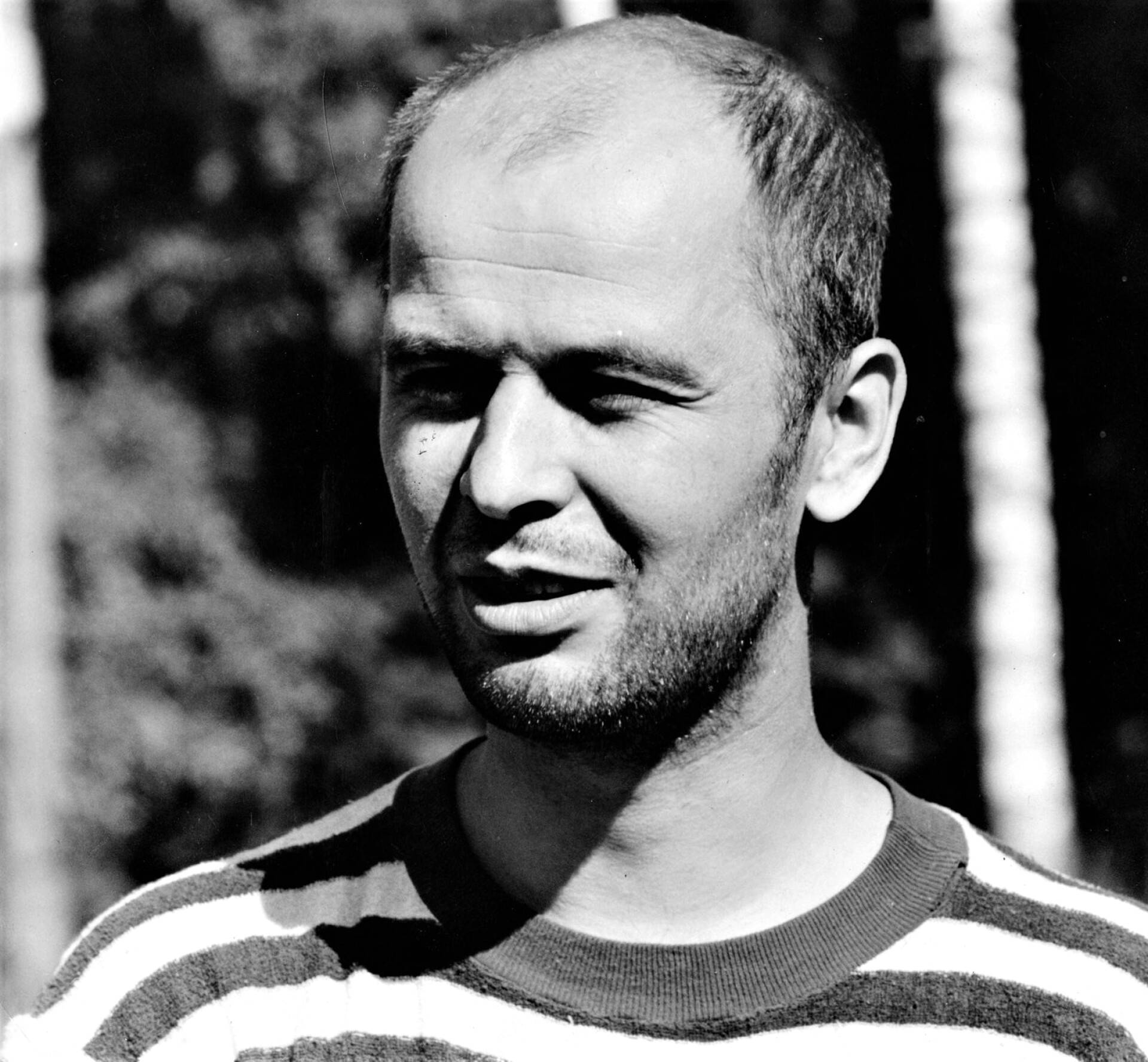
Jouko Turkka in the early 1970s.

Jouko Veli Turkka (17 April 1942 – 22 July 2016) was a Finnish theatrical director and controversialist. He was assistant director of the Helsinki City Theatre from 1975 to 1982, and a professor at the Helsinki Theatre Academy from 1981 to 1988, being its rector from 1982 to 1985. Turkka influenced a whole generation of Finnish actors, and created a recognisable style of acting.

Turkka died after a long illness on 22 July 2016, aged 74.

== Technique ==
The method was to progressively search for a mental borderline state by way of psychological and physical exertion, and the result was frequently an acting performance characterised by actors shaking uncontrollably and spewing spit and snot and other bodily fluids around them. Some likened the method to brainwashing, or to those of religious cults.

In 1987 the government had cause to remove him from his post as rector of the Helsinki School of Drama, when a group of his students held a performance at a theater symposium held in the city of Oulu. The organizers had specifically requested that the group should present something "shocking" so that there would be a bit of fuel for late night discussions at the bar. However the young students overshot expectations by staging a performance art piece in which they cut themselves to bleed, smeared each other with excrement, and crucified and whipped one of their number. The group, called "Jumalan teatteri" (The Theatre of God) in a direct reference to Antonin Artaud, also hurled excrement at the audience, resulting in well-publicised laundry bills and court cases for the recompense for same.

When the Finnish Minister of Culture appointed Maija-Liisa Márton to follow him as headmaster, the whole student body occupied and barricaded the school building with desks and chairs, refusing to "give it up".

Several actors have written books which describe their experiences with him, either as students or actors.

== Literary works ==
- Aiheita (1982; J. H. Erkko Award)
- Selvitys oikeuskanslerille (1984)
- Häpeä (1994)
- Nyt alkoi elämä (1996)
- Kärsimys on turhaa (2017)

== Selected plays, directed by ==
- Anu ja Mikko (1968)
- Hyvästi Mansikki (1969)
- Tuntematon sotilas (1971)
- Tulitikkuja lainaamassa (1972)
- Kyllikki ja Runar (1974, 1996)
- Nummisuutarit (1974, 1975)
- Siinä näkijä missä tekijä (1976)
- Niskavuoren nuori emäntä (1977)
- Putkinotko (1978)
- Aavesonaatti (1978)
- Viisas neitsyt (1979)
- Tuntematon sotilas (1979)
- Murtovarkaus (The Burglary) (1981)
- Voimamies (1982)
- Tuhat ja yksi yötä (1983)
- Hypnoosi (1985)
- Kött och Kärlek (1986)
- Valheita (1990)
- Presidentin dementia (1993)
- Att hyra en kändis (1994)
- Kumpi nauttii enemmän – mies vai nainen? (1995)
- Rakkaita pettymyksiä rakkaudessa (1996)
- Täysin tyydytetty nainen (1997)
- Yksi yö Ruotsalaista Kesää (2004)
- Konkurssisirkus (2005)

== Books about Jouko Turkka ==
- Sotilaan Tarina (1986) by Anna-Leena Härkönen (a novel which includes a recognizable character of a bald-headed theater director)
- Kausi Helvetissä (1988) by Kari Kontio
- Lihat Ylös! (1988) by Anneli Ollikainen
- Menkää mielenhäiriöön (2001) by Ville Virtanen (a roman à clef which Virtanen has openly acknowledged portrays his own student days under the Turkka method)
