= Vilho Lampi =

Finnish painter (1898–1936)

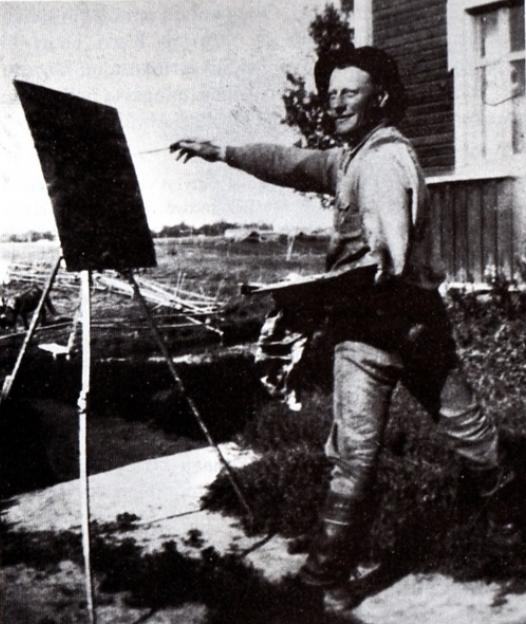
- Born: 19 July 1898; Oulu, Finland
- Died: 17 March 1936 (aged 37); Oulu, Finland
- Known for: Painter

Vilho Henrik Lampi (19 July 1898 – 17 March 1936) was a Finnish painter who is best known for his self-portraits and paintings of Liminka and the people who lived there.

== History ==
Lampi was born in Oulu but lived in Liminka for most of his life. He studied at the Finnish Academy of Fine Arts from 1921 to 1925 and after finishing his studies he returned to Liminka, where he lived and painted his most famous works.

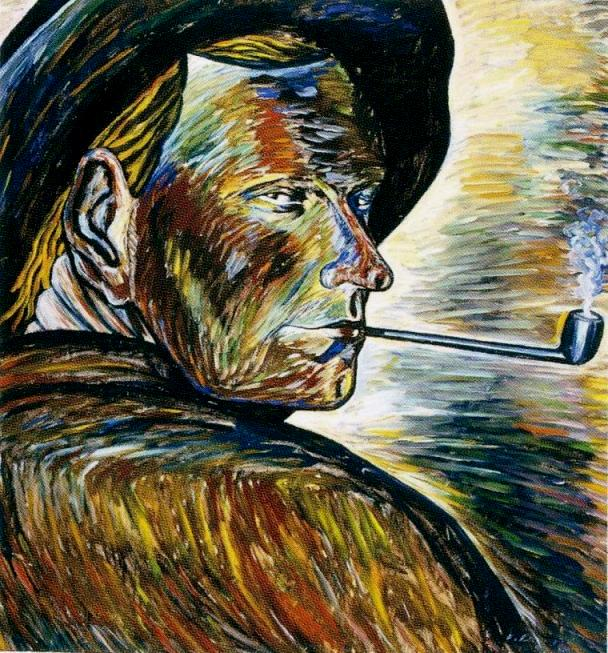
Self-Portrait, 1929

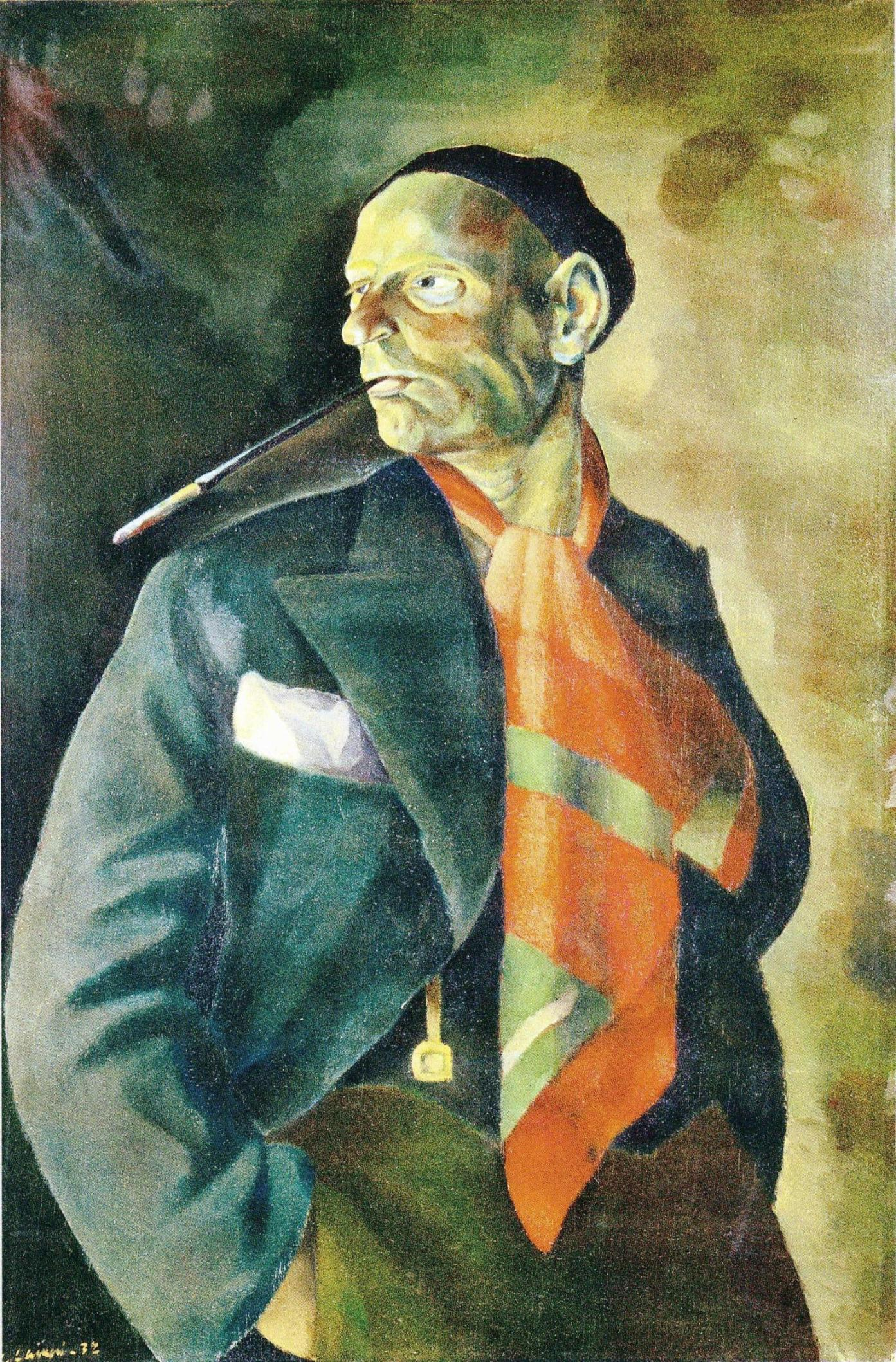
Self-Portrait, 1932

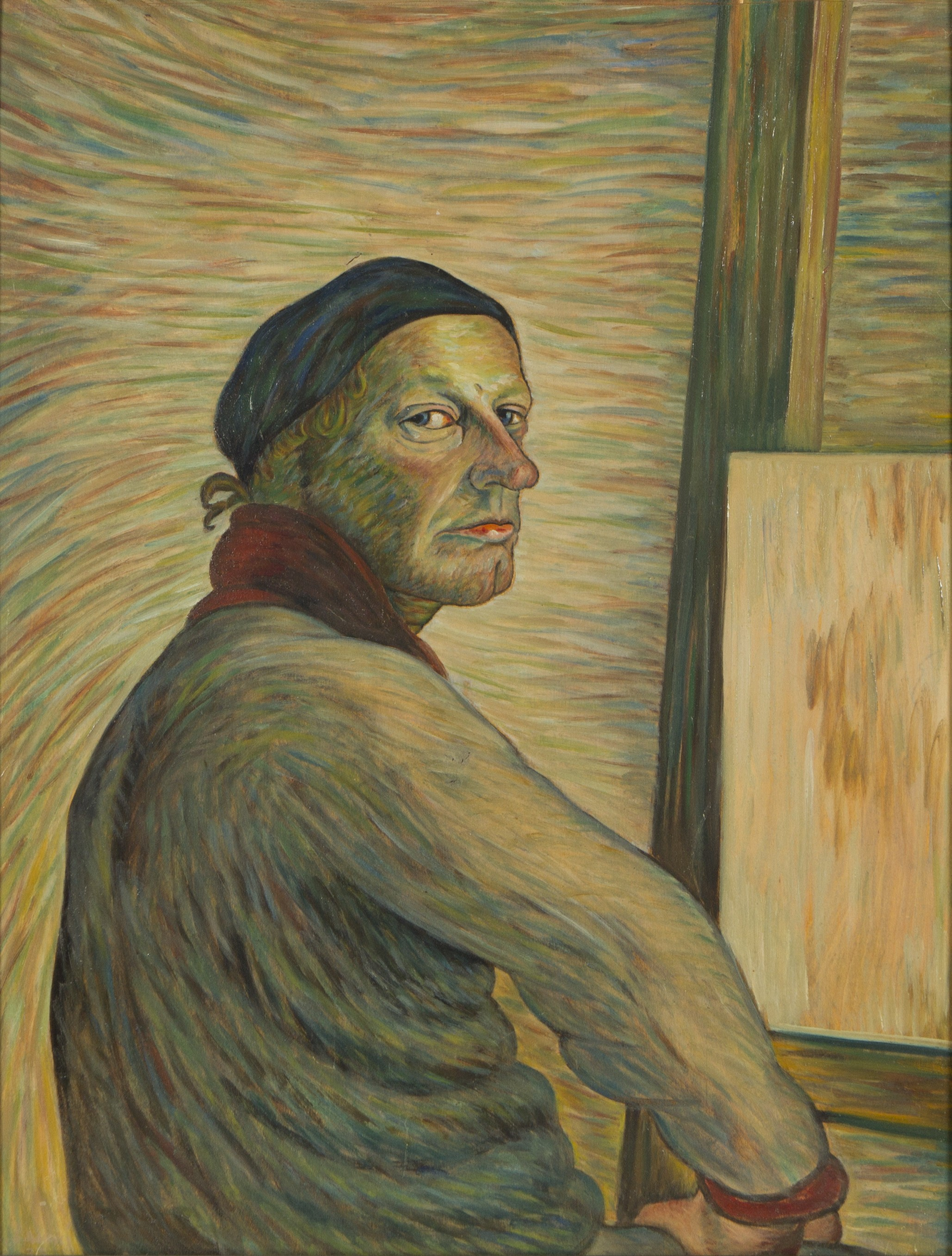
Self-Portrait, 1933

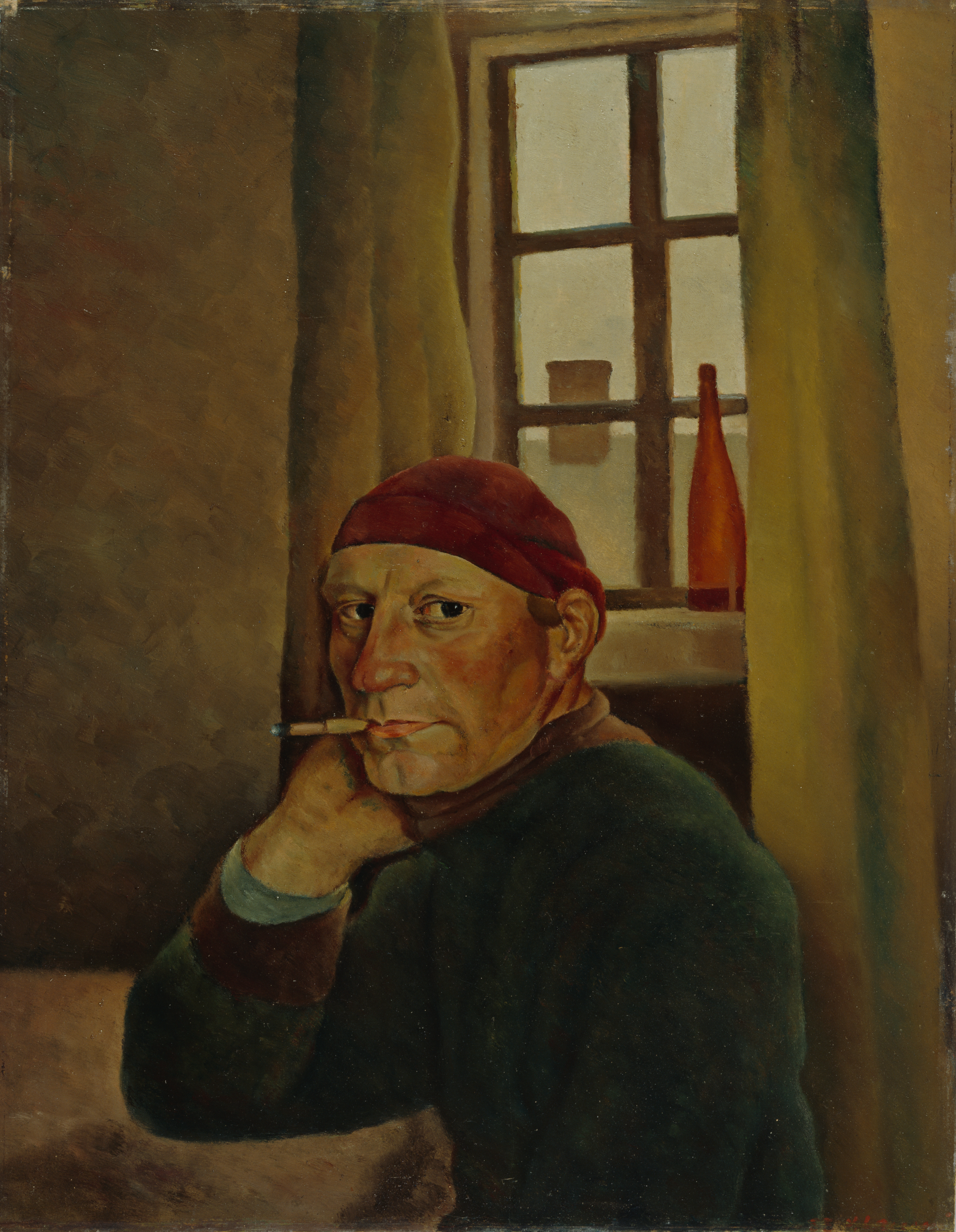
Self-Portrait, 1933

Lampi committed suicide on 17 March 1936 by jumping from a bridge to Oulujoki while visiting in Oulu.

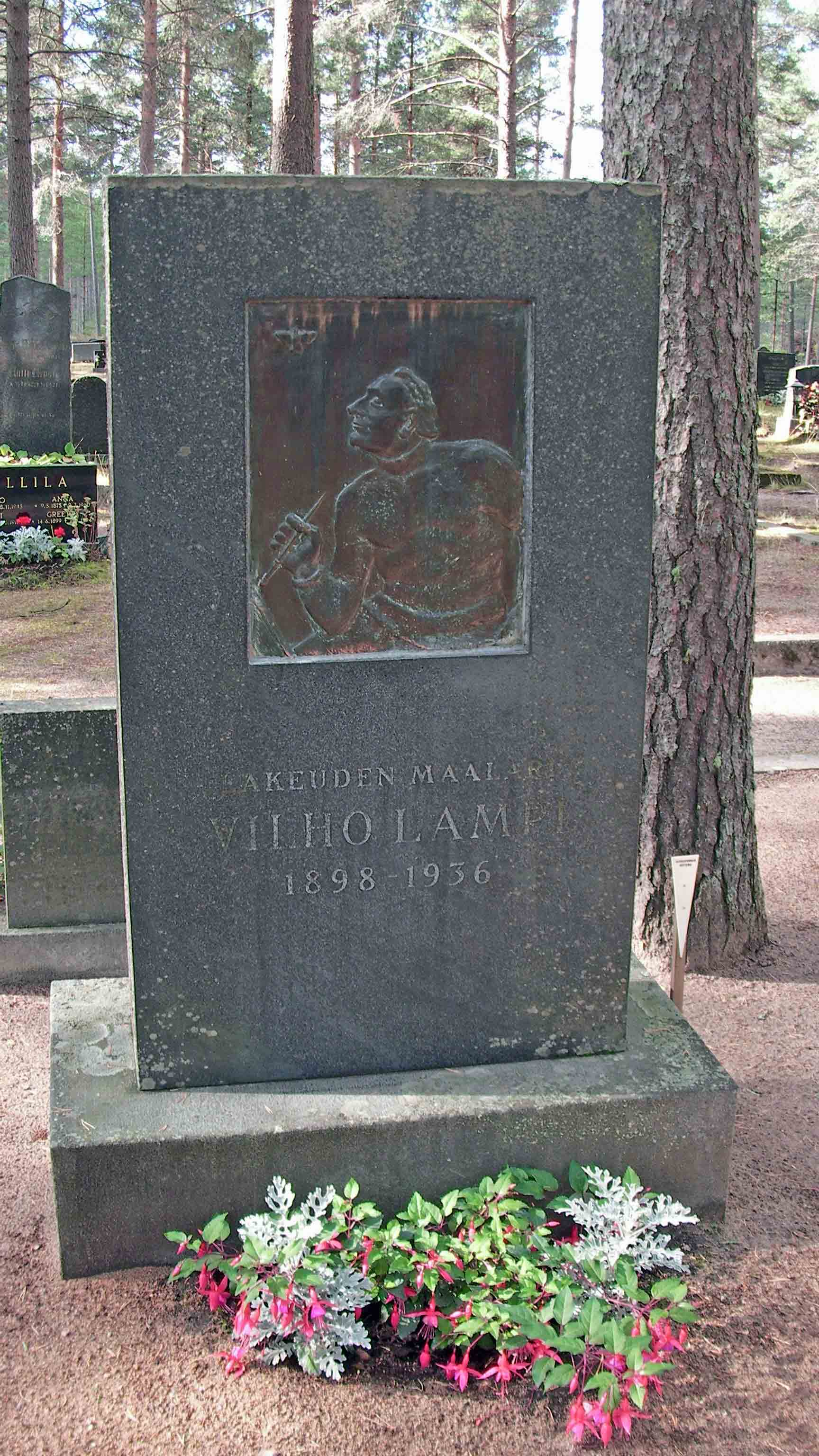
Grave in Liminka

== Literature ==
- Unto Immonen: Vilho Lampi, lakeuden melankoolikko in Suomen taiteen vuosikirja 1956–1957, Porvoo, 1957. (in Finnish)
- Paavo Rintala: Jumala on kauneus, (novel about Vilho Lampi) Otava, 1959. (in Finnish)
- Eeli Aalto: Vilho Lampi, lakeuden maalari : esittelyä ja taustaa, Arvi A. Karisto, Hämeenlinna, 1967. (in Finnish)
- Marja Junttila et al.: Vilho Lampi 1898–1936, ARS Nordica & Kustannus Pohjoinen, 1998 ISBN 951-749-312-6 (in Finnish)

== Films ==
- Eeli Aalto: Vilho Lampi, Lakeuden maalari, 1966.
- Hannu Heikinheimo: Jumala on kauneus, 1985.

== Plays ==
- Kaija Viinikainen: Jumala on kauneus, Kajaanin kaupunginteatteri, 1981.
- Kristian Smeds: Jumala on kauneus, Teatteri Takomo, 2000 and Finnish National Theatre, 2008.
- Taisto Reimaluoto: Tässä on elämä, Kajaanin Runoviikko, 2001.

== Gallery ==
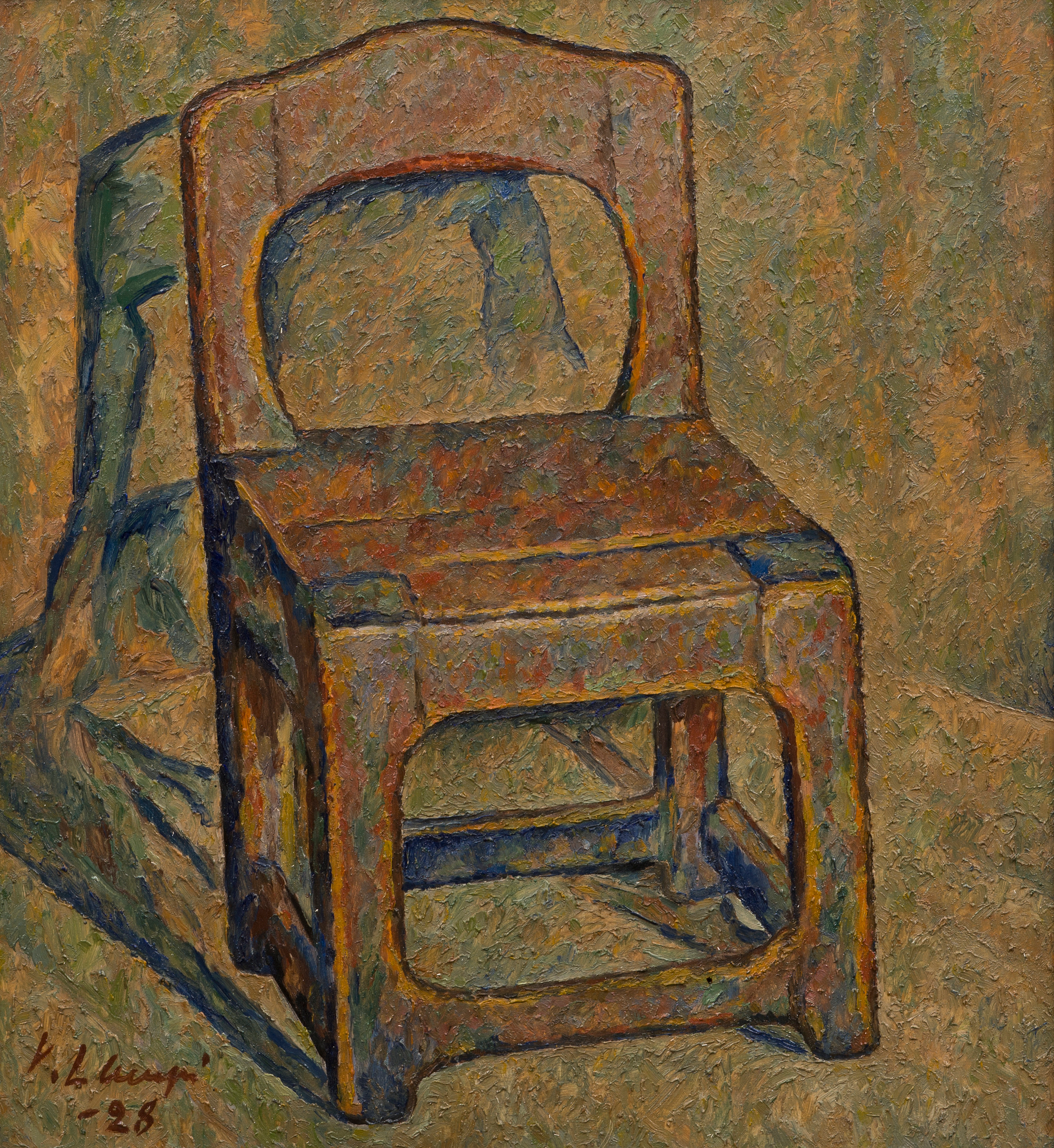
Chair, 1928

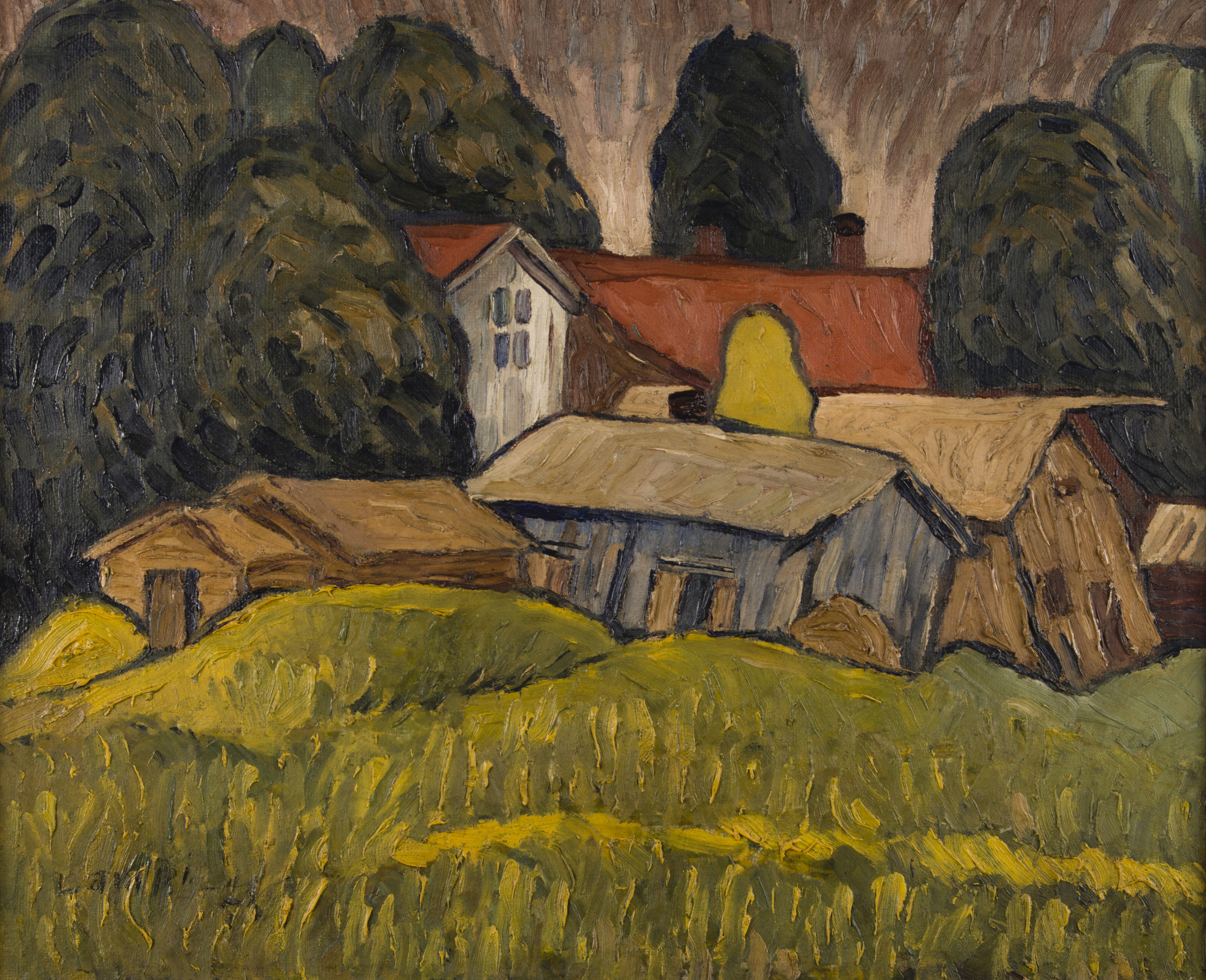
Rural View, 1929

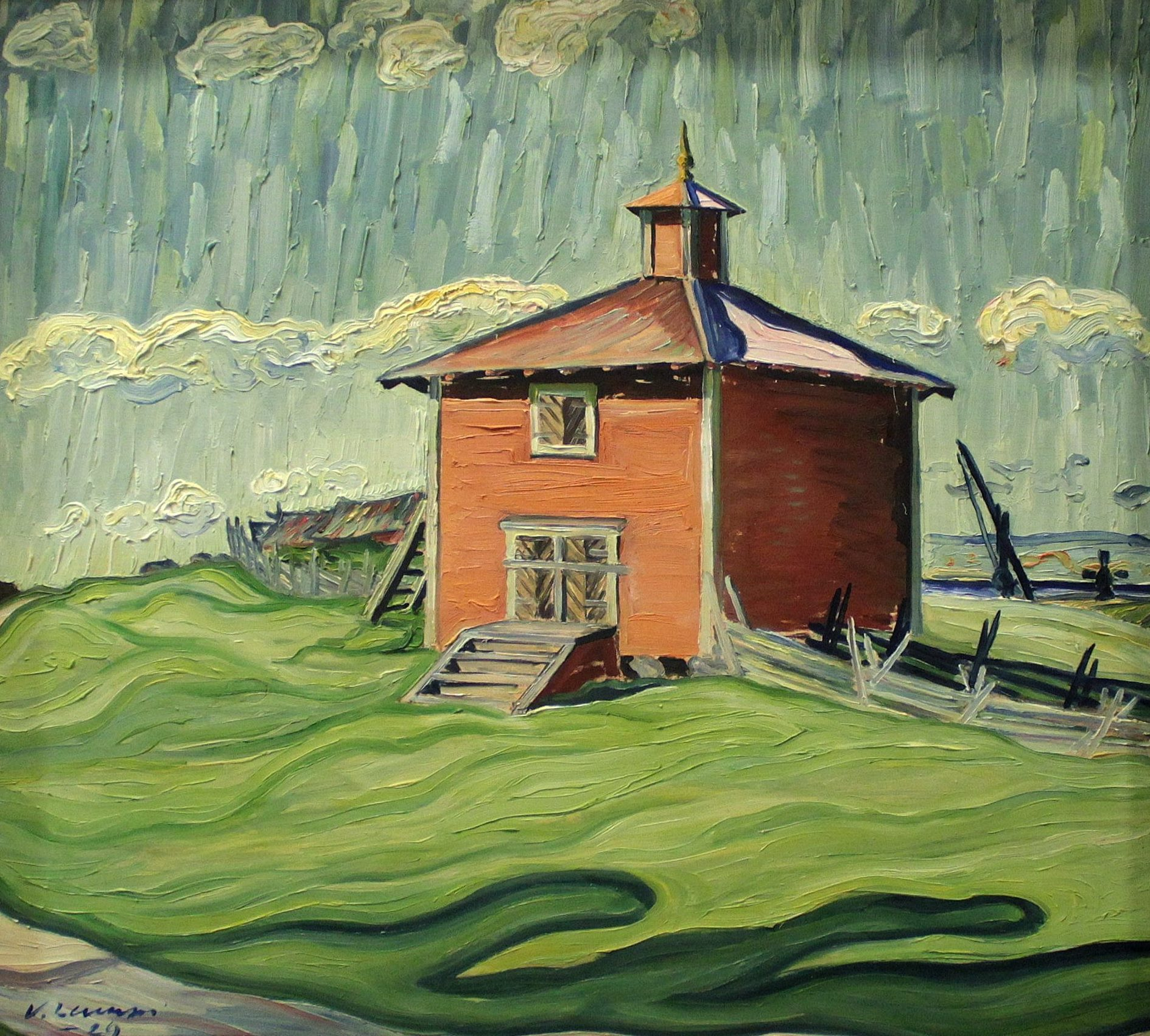
Granary, 1929

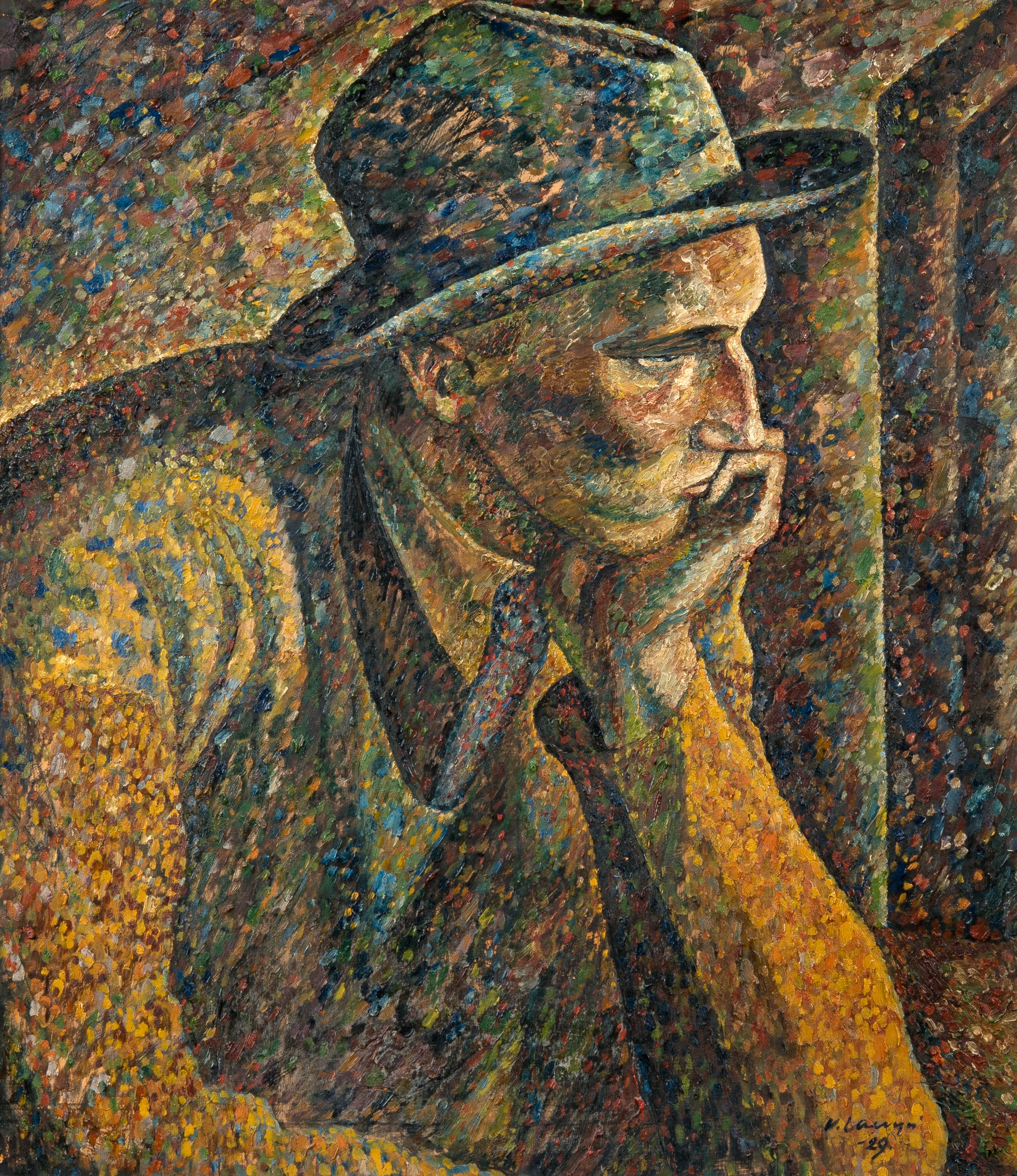
Ponderer, 1929

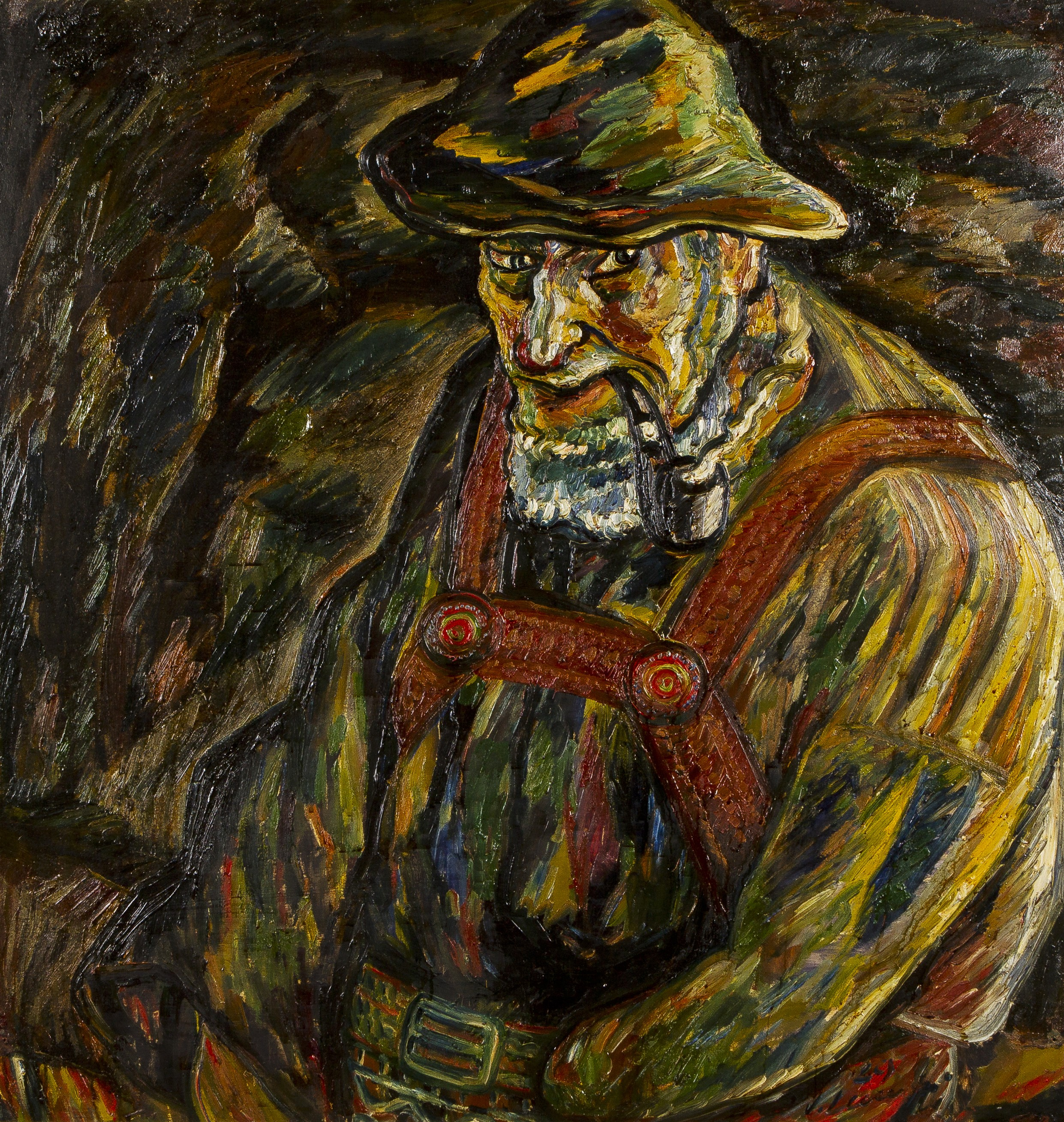
Ruhmu-Jussi, 1929

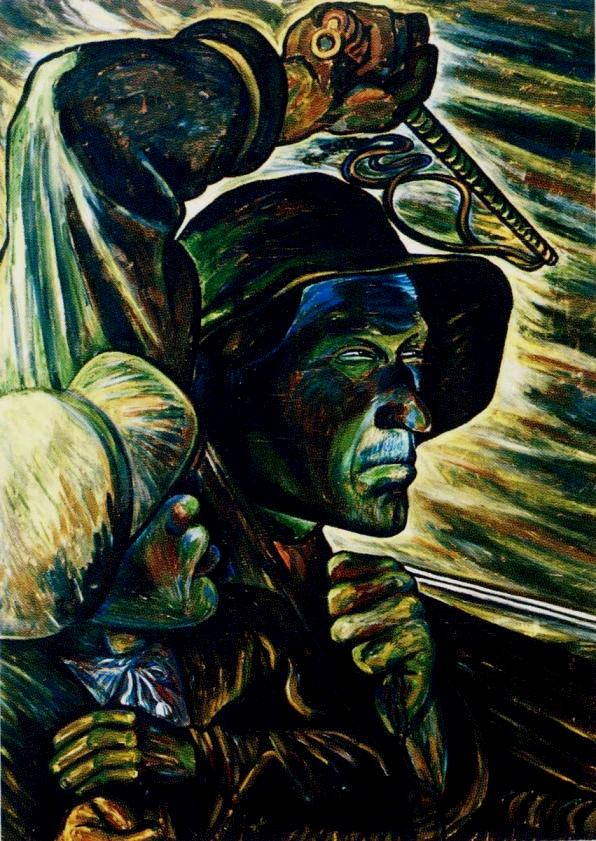
Horse-Copers, 1930

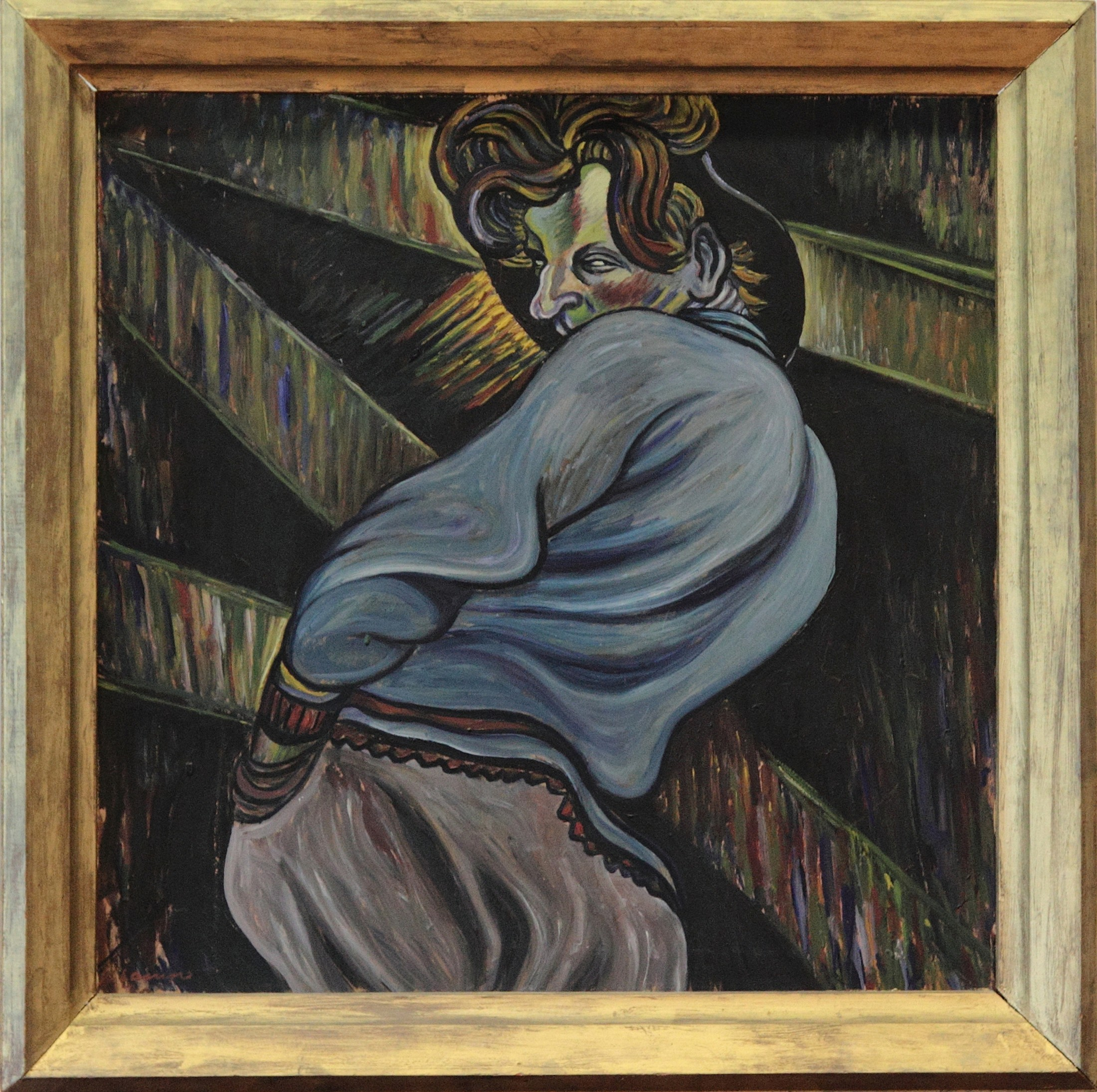
Emperor of the Parish, 1930

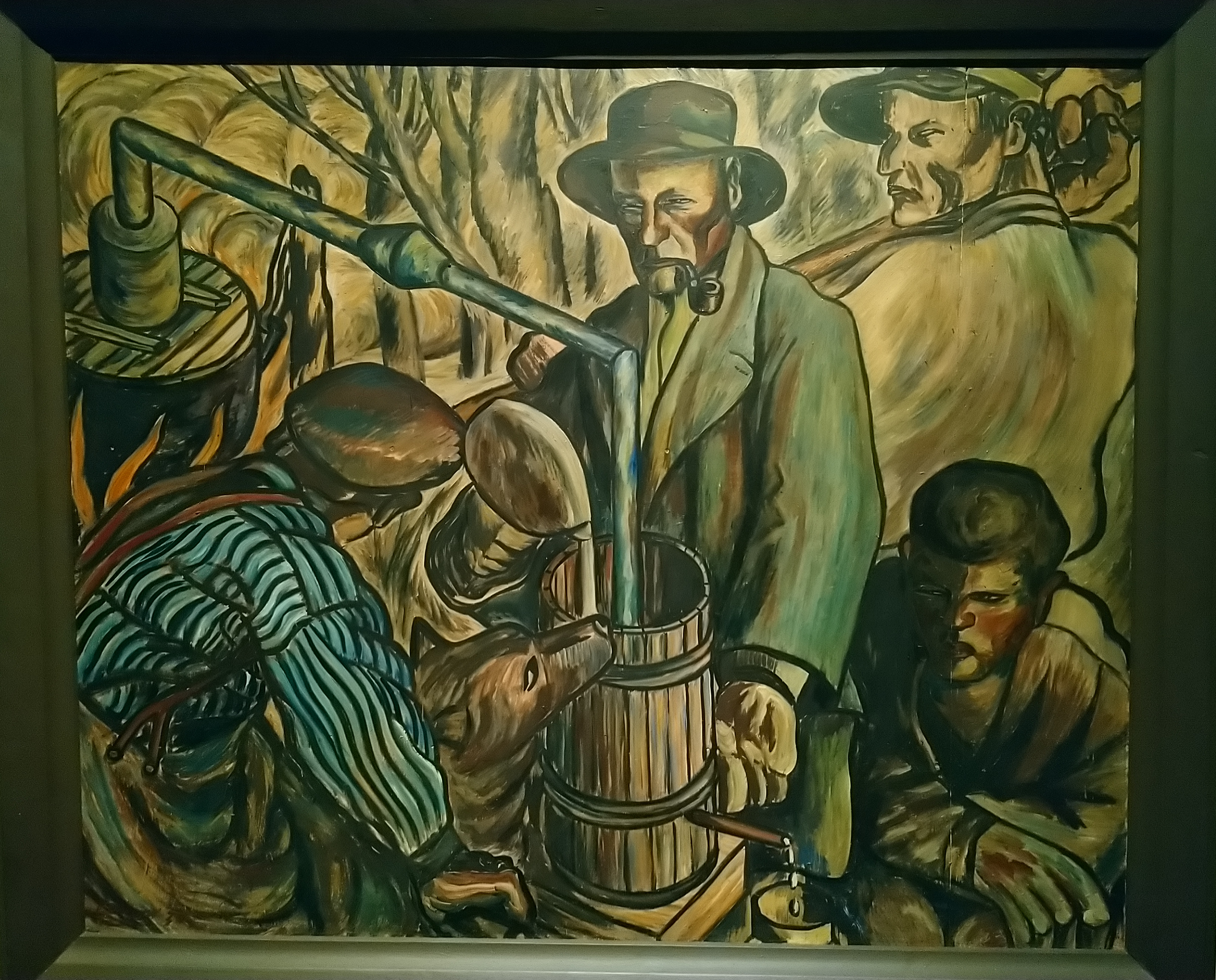
Moonshiners, 1930, with the artist himself in the middle

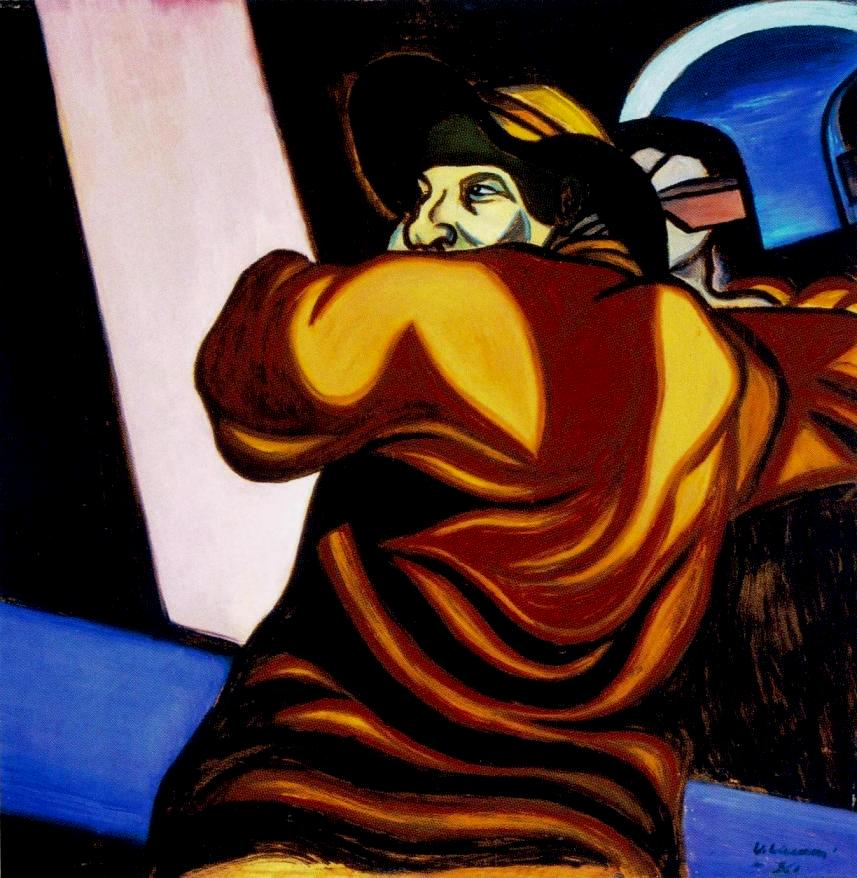
Decapitator, 1930

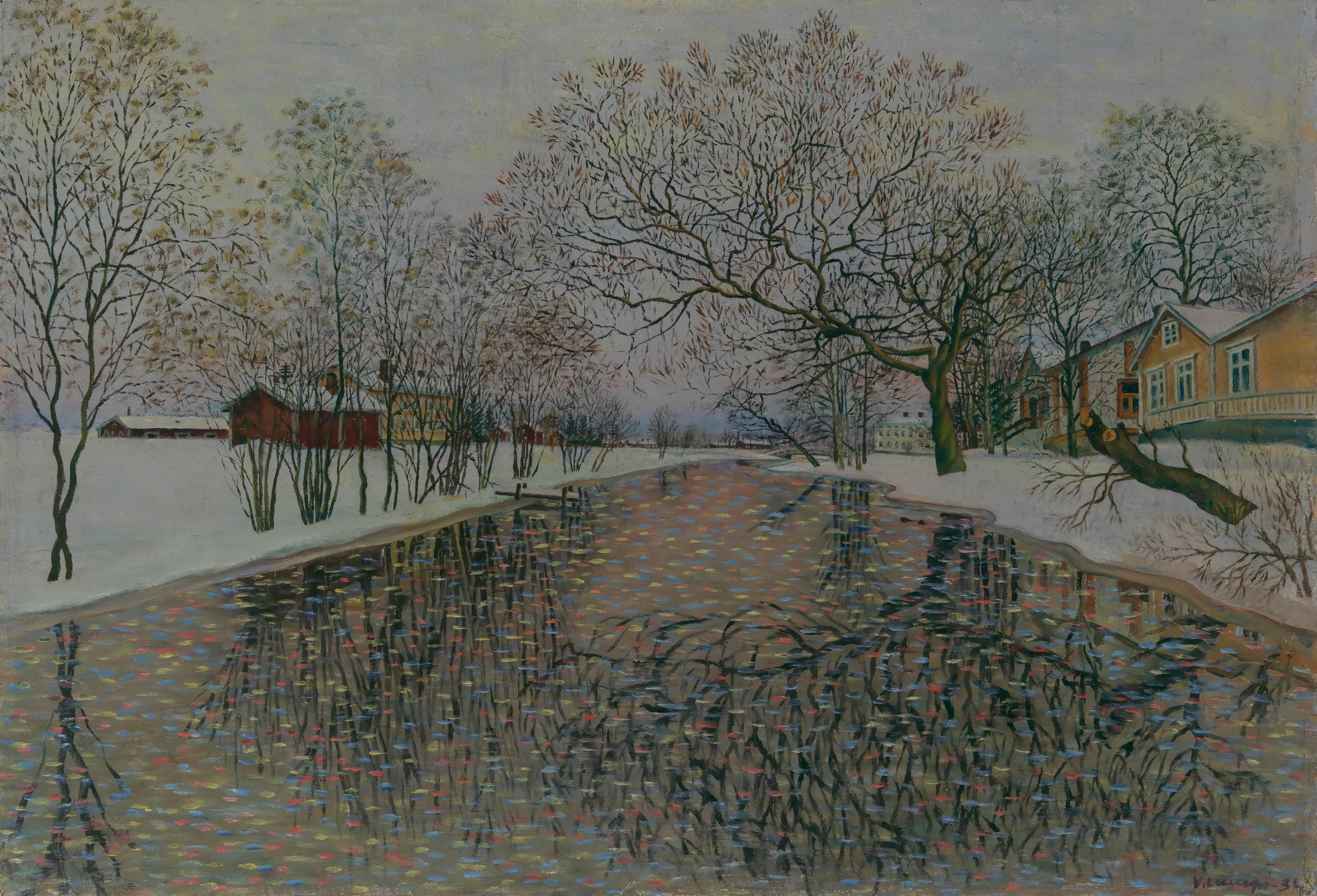
Liminganjoki River, 1934

== See also ==
- Finnish art
