= Koska et oo täällä enää =

2019 song by Saara Aalto

Single by Saara Aalto

from the album Fairytale – Joulun taikaa
- Released: 1 November 2019
- Genre: Pop
- Length: 3:38
- Label: Warner Music Finland
- Songwriter(s): Meri Sopanen; Saara Aalto
- Producer(s): Arto Ruotsala; Saara Aalto

Saara Aalto singles chronology
"Tähdet, taivas ja sä" (2019)	"Koska et oo täällä enää" (2019)	"When the Sun Goes Down" (2020)

"Koska et oo täällä enää" is a song performed by Finnish singer-songwriter Saara Aalto. It was released to digital retailers and streaming platforms on 1 November 2019 by Warner Music Finland. It was released as the second single from her seventh studio album Fairytale – Joulun taikaa.

== Track listing ==
Digital download and streaming
No.	Title	Length
1.	"Tähdet, taivas ja sä"	3:23
2.	"Koska et oo täällä enää"	3:38

== Personnel ==
Credits adapted from Tidal.

- Arto Ruotsala – producer, mixer, programmer
- Saara Aalto – producer, composer, lyricist, vocals
- Meri Sopanen – lyricist
- Pete Eklund – A&R manager

== Charts ==
Chart (2019)	Peak position
Finland Airplay (Radiosoittolista)	41

== Release history ==
Region	Date	Format	Label
Various	1 November 2019	Digital download; streaming	Warner Music Finland
