= Simo Aalto =

Finnish magician

- Born: 19 March 1960 (age 65); Oulu, Finland
- Known for: Magician
- Awards: Magician of the Year; 1997 world champion in close-up magic (FISM Lisbon 2000)
- Website: simoaalto.com

Simo Aalto (born 19 March 1960) is a magician who became popular in Finland in the 1980s. He established Joker Poker Box, which is labeled an artist-festival tour he owns with his wife Kirsti. Aalto is known for a wide range of skills from fingertip system to illusions. He also specializes in abdominal distension, imitation, and a number tricks.

Simo Aalto's daughter is ventriloquist, Sari Aalto and his brother's children are singers Suvi Aalto and Saara Aalto.
