= Saara Aalto =

Finnish singer, songwriter, and voice actress

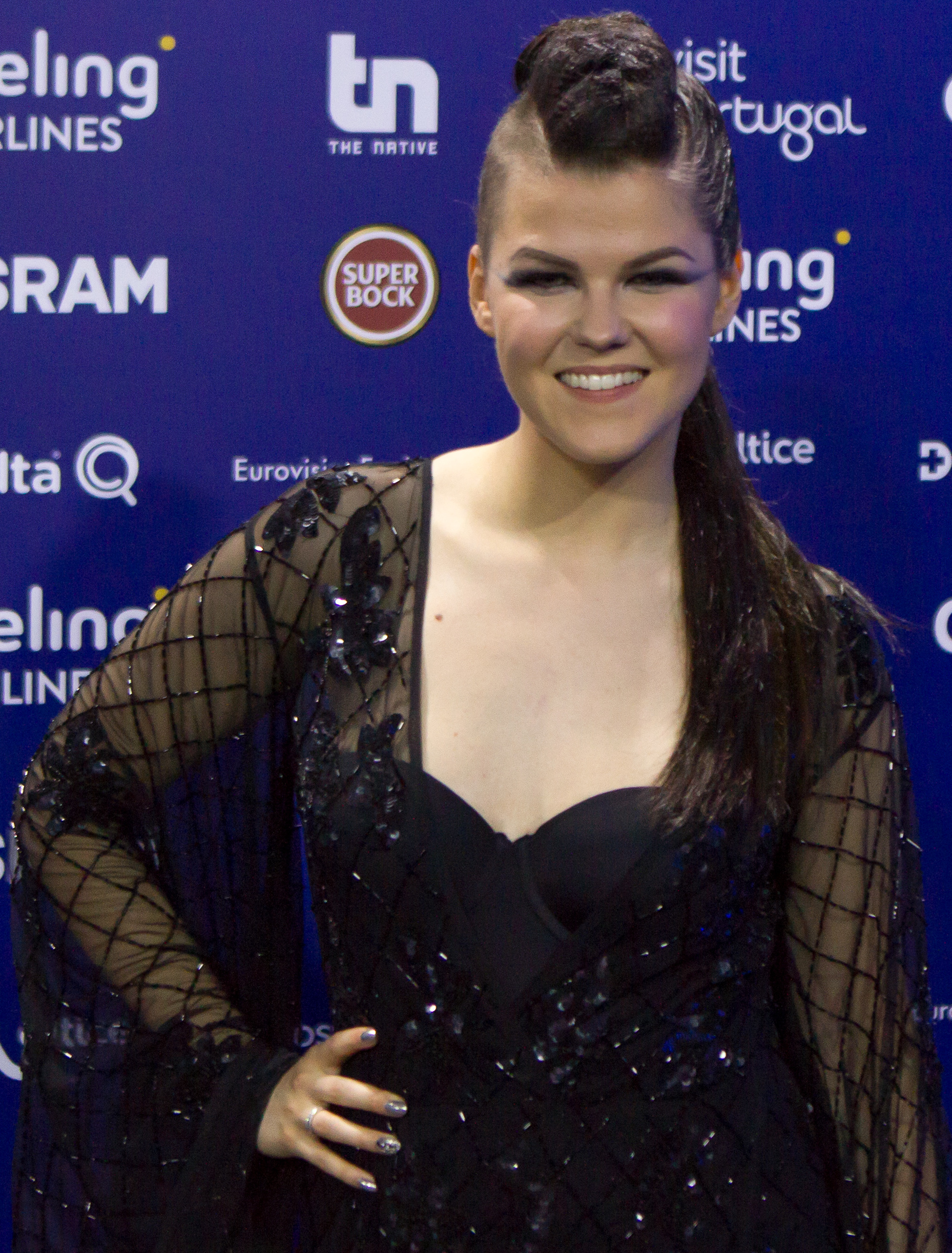
- Aalto at the Eurovision Song Contest 2018

Background information
- Born: Saara Sofia Aalto; 2 May 1987 (age 39); Oulunsalo, Finland
- Genre: Pop
- Occupations: Singer; songwriter; voice actress
- Instruments: Vocals; piano
- Years active: 1998–present
- Labels: Sony; No Fear Music
- Spouse: Meri Sopanen (m. 2020)
- Website: www.saaraaalto.com

Saara Sofia Aalto (born 2 May 1987) is a Finnish singer, songwriter and voice actress. In 2012, she came second in the first season of The Voice of Finland.

In 2016, Aalto finished as the runner-up in the thirteenth series of The X Factor UK, which gained her international recognition.

In 2018, she represented Finland in the Eurovision Song Contest 2018, in which she qualified for the grand final and finished in 25th place. Aalto became a judge on X Factor Suomi during the same year. In 2019, she participated on Dancing on Ice and finished in third place.

== Early life ==
Born in Oulunsalo, Finland, Aalto grew up in a musical family and received piano lessons from pianist and pedagogue Olga Maslak, born in Odessa, Soviet Union. Aalto wrote her first song at the age of five. Her grandfather is painter and documentary director Eeli Aalto and magician Simo Aalto is her uncle. In 1998 at age 11, she won the Kotka Maritime Festival song contest for children with one of her own compositions. Aalto also won the Charlotte Church international singing competition, organised in US, in 2003 with her own composition. Aalto represented Finland in the Golden Stag International Song Contest in Romania in 2004. She went to the Madetoja secondary school for music, where she graduated in 2005. After graduation, she moved to Helsinki to study music at the Sibelius Academy, and at the same time also studied singing in the Helsinki Pop & Jazz Conservatory.

== Career ==
=== 2007–2011: Career beginnings ===
In 2007, she participated in Talent Suomi ("Talent Finland"), finishing in the top three.

In addition to her singing career, Aalto is also an actress, having starred as Dorothy and Pfannee in the Finnish production of the musical Wicked and as Mary Magdalene in Jesus Christ Superstar. From 2008 to 2011, she appeared in the Helsinki City Theatre musicals, first as Kelsi in High School Musical on Stage! and its second installment, and then in Wicked.

=== 2011, 2016: Eurovision Song Contest ===
Aalto took part on two separate occasions in the selection process in a bid to represent Finland in the Eurovision Song Contest. She participated in the qualifying rounds in Finland for Eurovision 2011, placing second to Paradise Oskar who went on to represent Finland. She received 40.7% of the public televotes, compared to 46.7% for Oskar. Aalto's recording was released as a single by Yume Records, a self-released record label she founded together with Teemu Roivainen in 2011.

Her second bid to represent Finland was for Eurovision Song Contest 2016 through the competition Uuden Musiikin Kilpailu, again placing second. Although winning the public vote, she was disadvantaged with the judging vote going to the eventual winner Sandhja who went on to represent Finland with the song "Sing It Away".

=== 2010–2013: Success in China ===
Following her performance of "Blessed with Love" for qualification in Eurovision 2011, that December she was involved in the Santa Claus Season's Greetings Song Contest, where she sang "Ai De Zhu Fu", a Chinese (Mandarin) version of her Eurovision song "Blessed with Love". In November 2012, Aalto was guest vocalist at Robert Wells's highly successful show Rhapsody in Rock at Shanghai Daning theatre. Following a successful performance in Shanghai in May 2013, opening for Spanish tenor José Carreras and singing several songs in Chinese, Aalto returned to the city to duet with tenor Han Peng at the Closing Ceremony of the Shanghai International Film Festival in June 2013, broadcast to over 800 million viewers in 10 countries.

Finding great reception from Chinese audiences, in July 2013 Aalto went on to release a full album destined for Mainland China and other Chinese markets also titled Ai De Zhu Fu. On the album she performed nine of the album's 13 tracks in Mandarin language.

=== 2012: The Voice of Finland ===
Aalto participated in season one of The Voice of Finland. In the blind auditions, broadcast on 6 February 2012 on the Finnish commercial television channel Nelonen, she performed "Taking Chances" from Celine Dion with all four coaches, Elastinen, Lauri Tähkä, Paula Koivuniemi and Michael Monroe turning their chairs. She opted to be part of Team Monroe.

In the Battle Round on 17 February, she was confronted with team competitor Anna Inginmaa, both singing "True Colors". Coach Monroe opted for Aalto to go to the next round. In the live show on 23 March, she sang "Barracuda" and was saved by Monroe after failing to get enough votes from the public. She followed it up with the French language "Je suis malade" from Serge Lama and was safe after the public vote. In the semifinals with her rendition of "Over the Rainbow", she qualified for the finals held on 20 April where she sang "I'm Gonna Be Strong" from Frankie Laine and an original song titled "My Love". She placed second to winner Mikko Sipola.

=== 2016–present: The X Factor UK, Eurovision Song Contest and Wild Wild Wonderland ===
Aalto auditioned for the thirteenth UK series of The X Factor in 2016 in front of attending judges Simon Cowell, Louis Walsh and Nicole Scherzinger, singing a cover of Sia's "Chandelier", which earned her three yeses from the judges. At Bootcamp, she performed "On the Radio" by Donna Summer and was sent through as part of the over-25s category, mentored by Sharon Osbourne, who was not present at her audition. At the six-chair challenge, she performed "I See Fire" by Ed Sheeran and was sent home by Osbourne who stated a lack of connection. However, after the crowd chanted to bring her back, Aalto was given a second chance and performed "Je suis malade" by Serge Lama, which caused the crowd to turn on her, while Scherzinger criticized her song choice, stating "we ain't in France". Osbourne then asked Aalto to leave.

Aalto was brought back as Scherzinger's wildcard pick for the over-25s category and therefore went to judges' houses. She was chosen by Osbourne to proceed to the live shows after performing "The Winner Takes It All". In week 1 of the live shows, Aalto finished in the bottom three alongside Freddy Parker and duo Bratavio, after performing "Let It Go". As Parker was saved by the lifeline vote, Aalto faced a sing-off against Bratavio, where she performed "Alive", and was saved with only Walsh voting to eliminate her. The following week, she sang "River Deep – Mountain High" and finished again in the bottom three, this time alongside Ryan Lawrie and Parker. As Lawrie was saved by the lifeline vote, Aalto performed "Run" in a sing-off against Parker. Walsh and Osbourne voted to eliminate Parker while Scherzinger and Cowell voted to eliminate Aalto. The result went to deadlock and Aalto was saved as she had the higher public vote. In week 3 she performed "It's Oh So Quiet" coming 2nd in the public vote, and in week 4 Aalto sang "Bad Romance", placing 3rd in the public vote. In week 5, Aalto finished in the bottom three for the third time alongside Sam Lavery and group Four of Diamonds, after her rendition of "Sound of the Underground". As Lavery was saved by the lifeline vote, Aalto performed "Who You Are" in a sing-off against Four of Diamonds, and was saved with only Walsh voting to eliminate her. Voting statistics revealed that Aalto would have never been in the sing-off had there been no lifeline vote since she had higher public vote than Parker, Lawrie and Lavery on weeks 1, 2 and 5 respectively. Her following performances were "No More Tears (Enough Is Enough)" in week 6 placing 2nd and "My Heart Will Go On" in week 7 again placing 2nd. In the quarter-final, she sang "The Winner Takes It All" and a medley of "Diamonds Are Forever" and "Diamonds Are a Girl's Best Friend", topping the public vote for the first time. Following the eliminations of Relley C in week 3 and Honey G in the quarter-final, Aalto became Osbourne's last remaining act in the competition.

In the semi-final, she sang a medley of "White Christmas" and "All I Want for Christmas Is You", and "Chandelier" as her second song, topping the vote again reaching the final, where on 10 December she performed "Everybody Wants to Rule the World" and "Bohemian Rhapsody", the latter as a duet with Adam Lambert, again topping the public vote. With the elimination of the group 5 After Midnight she was in the top 2 alongside Matt Terry. In the final on 11 December, she performed "It's Oh So Quiet" and "I Didn't Know My Own Strength". In the ensuing public vote, she placed as the runner-up to eventual winner Matt Terry with 40.4% of the votes.

The X Factor performances and results
Show	Song choice	Theme	Result
Auditions	"Chandelier"	—N/a	Through to bootcamp
Bootcamp	"On the Radio"	—N/a	Through to six-chair challenge
Six-chair challenge	"I See Fire"	—N/a	Eliminated; re-instated as a wildcard
Six-chair challenge	"Je suis malade"	—N/a	Eliminated; re-instated as a wildcard
Judges' houses	"The Winner Takes It All"	—N/a	Through to live shows
Live show 1	"Let It Go"	Express Yourself	Bottom three (9th)
Live show 1	"Alive"	Sing-Off	Saved (Majority vote)
Live show 2	"River Deep – Mountain High"	Motown	Bottom three (9th)
Live show 2	"Run"	Sing-Off	Saved (Deadlock)
Live show 3	"It's Oh So Quiet"	Divas & Legends	Safe (2nd)
Live show 4	"Bad Romance"	Fright Night	Safe (3rd)
Live show 5	"Sound of the Underground"	Girlband vs. Boyband	Bottom three (6th)
Live show 5	"Who You Are"	Sing-Off	Saved (Majority vote)
Live show 6	"No More Tears (Enough Is Enough)"	Disco	Safe (2nd)
Live show 7	"My Heart Will Go On" from Titanic	Movies	Safe (2nd)
Quarter-Final	"The Winner Takes It All"	Louis Loves	Safe (1st)
Quarter-Final	"Diamonds Are Forever" / "Diamonds Are a Girl's Best Friend"	Contestant's choice	Safe (1st)
Semi-Final	"White Christmas" / "All I Want for Christmas Is You"	Christmas	Safe (1st)
Semi-Final	"Chandelier"	Contestant's choice	Safe (1st)
Final (Saturday)	"Everybody Wants to Rule the World"	New song	Safe (1st)
Final (Saturday)	"Bohemian Rhapsody" (with Adam Lambert)	Celebrity duet	Safe (1st)
Final (Sunday)	"It's Oh So Quiet"	Song of the series	Runner-up (40.4%)
Final (Sunday)	"I Didn't Know My Own Strength"	New Song	Runner-up (40.4%)

In a press conference in December 2016, Aalto revealed that she works with the joint effort of ROAR Global and Global career management companies, and that she has signed a five-album recording deal with Sony Music UK and Sony Music Finland. In October 2017, Aalto announced she had left Sony Music for Warner Music Group. In a statement, she said: "I was honoured I was signed to Sony. But later I felt like they weren't the right team. When I met the people at Warner they were very excited about my style and making me into this big theatrical artist." On 7 November 2017, it was announced that Aalto would represent Finland in the Eurovision Song Contest 2018 in Lisbon, Portugal. The three bidding entries were released by Yle and Saara Aalto, along with an accompanying music video. Aalto was a judge on the second series of the Finnish version of The X Factor, mentoring the girls. Aalto could not attend the finale night of The X Factor Finland due to her commitments with Eurovision, so Terry represented her instead, but her category's last girl, Tika Liljegren, was crowned the winner, making Aalto the winning mentor. Aalto announced in March 2018 via social media that her first album under Warner Music Group, Wild Wild Wonderland, would be released on 27 April 2018.

In 2019 Aalto participated in the eleventh series of Dancing on Ice. She was partnered with Hamish Gaman, and after reaching the final, she and Garman finished in third place. Aalto's song Dance Like Nobody's Watching was the official song of Pride in London 2019. That same year, Aalto founded her own record label titled No Fear Music. It was under that label she released her Fairytale – International EP.

In September 2020, Aalto announced the release of her single, "When the Sun Goes Down", a collaboration with British drag queen Baga Chipz. She was also revealed to have parted ways with Warner Music in spring 2020.

In autumn 2021, Aalto played the lead role in the musical We Will Rock You in Helsinki, Finland.

== Personal life ==
Aalto was in a nine-year relationship with singer Teemu Roivainen which ended in 2013. The two continued collaborating in music.

Aalto later began a relationship with a female fan, Meri Sopanen, who worked as a personal trainer and life coach; she has since identified as a lesbian. Aalto and Sopanen became engaged on their second anniversary in August 2016, and moved to London in January 2017. The couple married in April 2020, with Sopanen adopting Aalto's surname, but due to the COVID-19 pandemic they were not able to hold a wedding ceremony and moved back to Finland in the spring of 2020. In the fall of 2021, the couple had a temporary home in Spain before returning to Finland in November. They celebrated their wedding in Italy in June 2023.

== Discography ==
=== Albums ===
Title	Details	Peak chart positions
Title	Details	FIN
Blessed with Love	Released: 11 May 2011; Label: Yume Records Oy; Formats: Digital download, CD	—
Enkeleitä – Angels	Released: 9 November 2011; Label: Yume Records Oy; Formats: Digital download, CD	—
You Had My Heart	Released: 24 May 2013; Label: Yume Records Oy; Formats: Digital download, CD	43
Ai De Zhu Fu	Released: 29 August 2013; Label: Yume Records Oy; Formats: Digital download, CD	—
Tonight (with Teemu Roivainen)	Released: 8 April 2015; Label: Yume Records Oy; Formats: Digital download, CD	—
Wild Wild Wonderland	Released: 27 April 2018; Label: Warner Music; Formats: Digital download, CD	2
Fairytale – Joulun taikaa	Released: 15 November 2019; Label: Warner Music Finland; Formats: Digital download, CD	10
"—" denotes an album that did not chart or was not released in that territory.

=== Extended plays ===
Title	Details
Fairytale – International	Released: 29 November 2019; Label: No Fear Music; Formats: Digital download, CD

=== Singles ===
==== As lead artist ====
Title	Year	Peak chart positions				Album
Title	Year	FIN	FIN (Air)	ICE	SWE Heat.	Album
"Blessed with Love" (Note: Selection process for Finnish entry to Eurovision Song Contest 2011)	2011	—	—	—	—	Blessed with Love
"You Had My Heart"	2013	—	—	—	—	You Had My Heart
"You Raise Me Up" (with Teemu Roivainen)	2014	—	—	—	—	Tonight
"No Fear" (Note: Selection process for Finnish entry to Eurovision Song Contest 2016)	2016	—	—	—	—	Wild Wild Wonderland
"Monsters" (Note: Selection process for Finnish entry to Eurovision Song Contest 2018)	2018	13	6	19	7	Wild Wild Wonderland
"Domino"	2018	—	18	—	—	Wild Wild Wonderland
"Queens"	2018	—	12	—	—	Wild Wild Wonderland
"DANCE!!!"	2018	—	—	—	—	Wild Wild Wonderland
"Dance Like Nobody's Watching"	2019	—	—	—	—	Wild Wild Wonderland
"Starry Skies"	2019	—	—	—	—	Fairytale – International
"Tähdet, taivas ja sä"	2019	—	—	—	—	Fairytale – Joulun taikaa
"Koska et oo täällä enää"	2019	—	41	—	—	Fairytale – Joulun taikaa
"When the Sun Goes Down" (with Baga Chipz)	2020	—	100	—	—	Non-album single
"Every Christmas Day"	2020	—	—	—	—	Fairytale – International
"—" denotes a single that did not chart or was not released in that territory.

==== As featured artist ====
Title	Year	Album
"Sydämesi tyhjä huone" (Teemu Roivainen featuring Saara Aalto)	2015	Sydämesi tyhjä huone

=== Promotional singles ===
Title	Year	Album
"My Love" (The Voice Performance)	2012	Non-album singles
"Enkeleitä"	2013	Non-album singles
"Reach the Stars" (Note: To commemorate Chinese New Year 2014 (Year of the Horse) (song in English and Mandarin))	2014	Non-album singles
"Feel Vegas" (with Teemu Roivainen featuring Big Spender)	2015	Non-album singles
"Let It Go"	2019	Non-album singles

=== Other appearances ===
Title	Year	Other Artists	Album
"Art of Forgiveness"	2015	Jonna	Sound Mind
"All I Ask of You" (Note: The Phantom of the Opera)	2015	Waltteri Torikka	Sydän

== Dubbing ==
=== Film ===
Year	Title	Role	Notes
2008	The Tale of Despereaux	Princess Pea	Finnish version
2010	Alice in Wonderland	Alice	Finnish version
2011	From Up on Poppy Hill	Umi	Finnish version
2012	Brave	Soloist	Finnish version
2012	Rise of the Guardians	Tooth Fairy	Finnish version
2013	Frozen	Anna	Finnish version
2015	Frozen Fever	Anna	Finnish version
2017	Olaf's Frozen Adventure	Anna	Finnish version
2019	Frozen 2	Anna	Finnish version
2024	Wicked	Glinda	Finnish version

=== Television ===
Year	Title	Role	Notes
2011–2023	Bubble Guppies	Molly	Finnish version
2011–2014	Pokémon	Iris	Finnish version
2012–present	Winx Club	Musa	Finnish version
2015	Hey Duggee	Norrie	Finnish version
2015	Rocka-Bye Island	Lee	Finnish version
2016	K3	Kylie	Finnish version

== Awards and achievements ==
Year	Award	Category	Results	Ref.
2016	Iltalehti	Finnish Person of the Year	Won	
2017	Vuoden Positiivisin Suomalainen	The Most Positive Person in Finland	Won	

Awards and achievements
Preceded by Norma John with "Blackbird"	Finland in the Eurovision Song Contest; 2018	Succeeded by Darude feat. Sebastian Rejman with "Look Away"
