= Kaleva (newspaper) =

Finnish newspaper published in Oulu

- Type: Daily newspaper
- Format: Tabloid
- Owner(s): Kaleva Oy
- Editor: Kyösti Karvonen
- Founded: 1899; 126 years ago
- Political alignment: Neutral
- Language: Finnish
- Headquarters: Oulu, Finland
- Circulation: 42,000 (2024)
- ISSN: 0356-1356
- Website: www.kaleva.fi

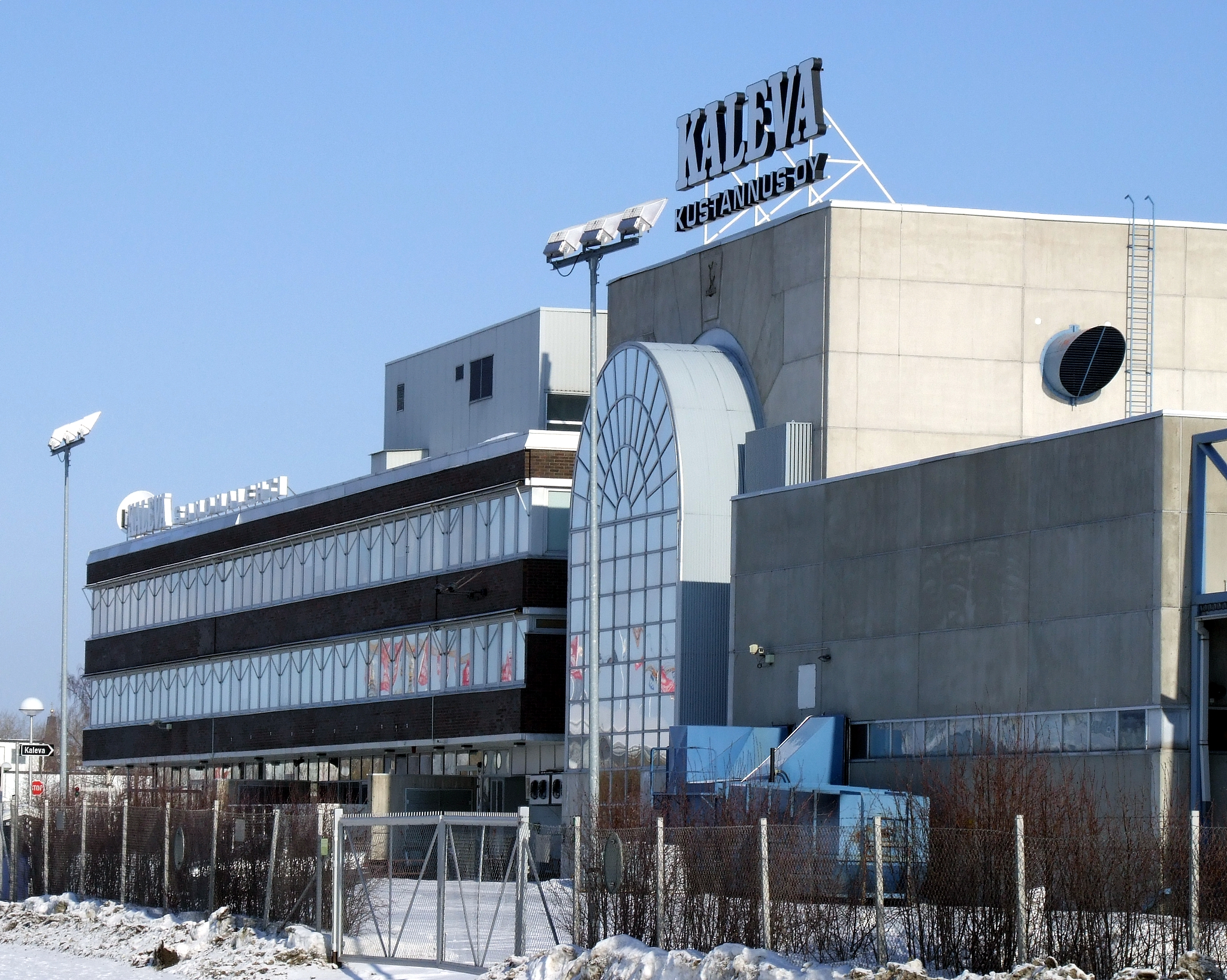
Former head office of Kaleva, based in Karjasilta, Oulu

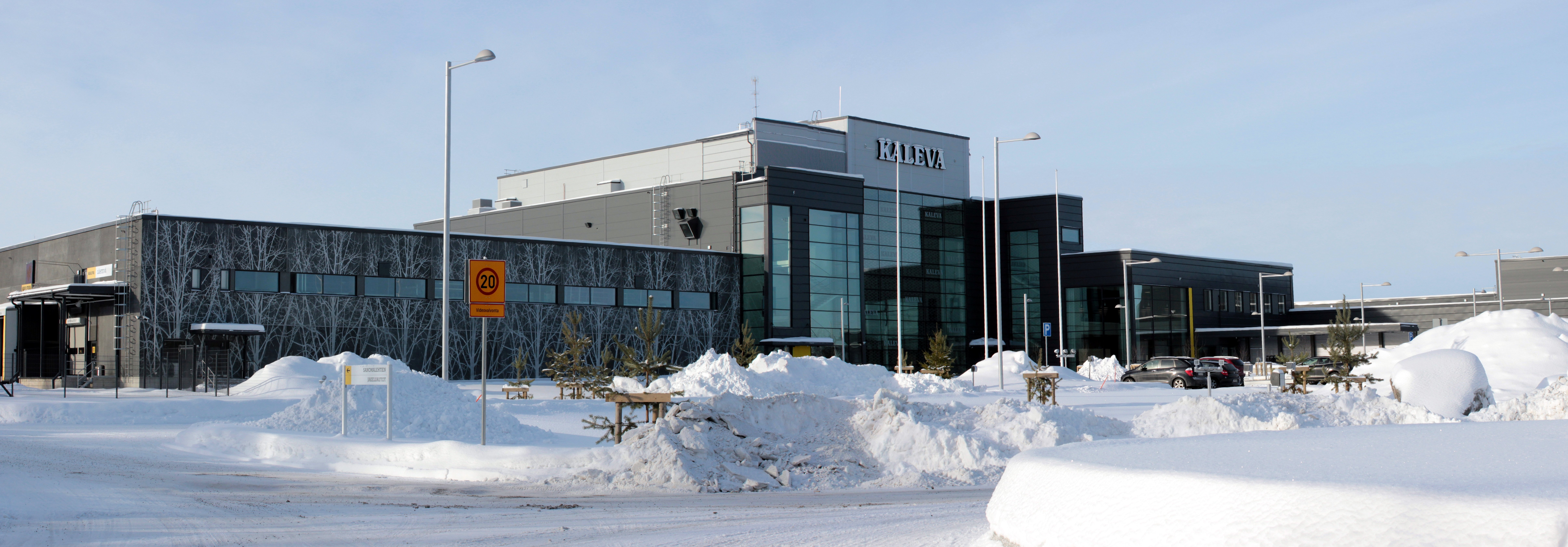
Printing house in Takalaanila

Kaleva is a Finnish subscription newspaper published in Oulu, Finland.

== History and profile ==
Kaleva was founded in 1899 by Juho Raappana. The owner of the paper is Kaleva Oy and its publisher is Kaleva publishing house. The paper is based in Oulu and is published in broadsheet format.

Although Kaleva has a neutral stance and no political affiliation, the paper supported the Progress Party until 1953. Since 2015 Kyösti Karvonen has been serving as the editor-in-chief of Kaleva.

In 2011 Kaleva published a report on the sexual abuse of children by the members of the Conservative Laestadianism, leading to public anger and the cancellation of subscription by nearly 200 readers.

== Circulation ==
In 1993 Kaleva had a circulation of 95,118 copies. Its circulation was 83,151 copies in 2001. It had a circulation of 82,600 copies in 2003. The 2004 circulation of the paper was 82,566 copies and it was the fourth best-selling paper in the country. The same year the paper had a readership of 221,000.

Kaleva had the fourth biggest circulation of seven-day newspapers in Finland with 82,000 copies in 2007. The circulation of the daily was 81,716 copies in 2008 and 80,826 copies in 2009. It fell to 78,216 copies in 2010 and to 74,787 copies in 2011. The circulation of the paper was 72,107 copies in 2012. The same year its website visited by 0.19 million people per week. In 2013 Kaleva had a circulation of 69,540 copies and was the sixth largest Finnish newspaper by circulation.
