= The Family (songwriters) =

Swedish songwriting and music production team

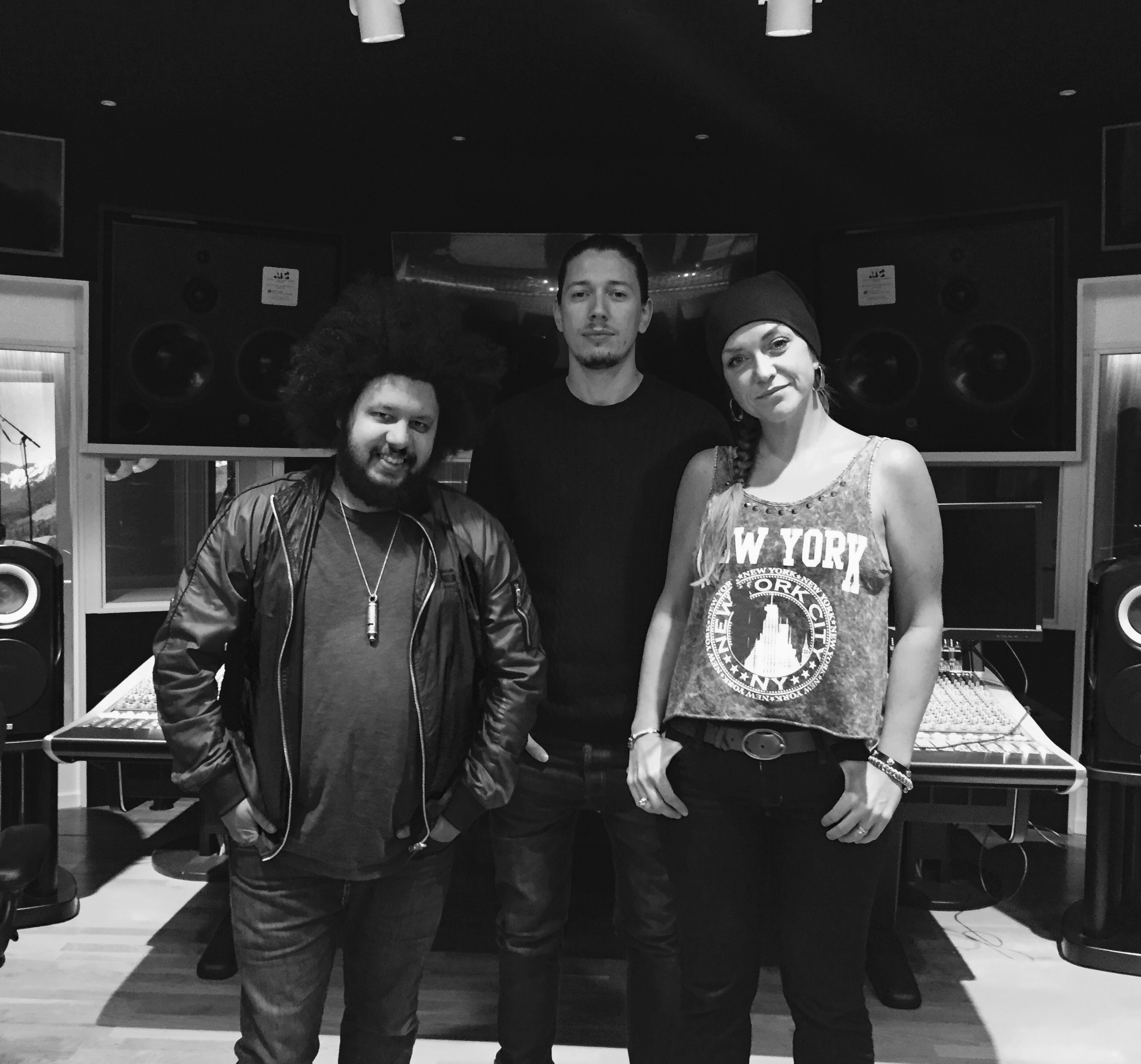

Background information
- Genres: Pop; pop rock; electropop; R&B
- Occupations: Songwriter; record producer
- Years active: 2013–present
- Label: Northbound Music Group
- Members: Joy Deb; Linnéa Deb; Anton Hård af Segerstad

The Family is a Swedish songwriting and music production team consisting of the married couple Joy & Linnéa Deb and Anton Hård Af Segerstad. They have worked with artists such as Fifth Harmony, JoJo, and Måns Zelmerlöw. Together they wrote and composed the Eurovision Song Contest winning song "Heroes" performed by Måns Zelmerlöw in 2015. The song has had huge success and is the third-highest-scoring song in the history of the ESC. "Heroes" also peaked at #1 in 22 countries and was certified 5× Platinum in Sweden.

== Biography ==
The trio first met in 2013 while competing with different songs in the Swedish Eurovision Song Contest (Melodifestivalen). Anton competing with the song "Begging" performed by Anton Ewald which finished in fourth place, and Joy's & Linnea's contribution "You" performed by Robin Stjernberg. "You" won the Swedish ESC and went on to the finals, (also) held in Sweden, Malmö. As from this point they slowly started to collaborate and in 2014 they presented their first contribution to next years ESC (Melodifestivalen) as a production-group with "Echo" performed by Outtrigger.

Now working together they continued their success writing more and bigger hits. In 2016 The Family managed to get four different contributions in the Swedish ESC. -Performed by Lisa Ajax, Ace Wilder, Molly Pettersson Hammar and ISA. The Family were appointed "Songwriter of the year" in the contest.

As of 2016 the Family is based in the Stockholm-based studio Northbound where they've started working more towards the US pop-market. The trio wrote and produced the first record "Top Down" on Fifth Harmony's album Reflection. They also wrote JoJo's comeback single "Save My Soul".

In 2016, "Oh Lord" was released with the British vocal harmony boy band MiC LOWRY. The song was the group's debut single and it was written by The Family, Augustine Grant and Phil Collins, as the song contains lyrics and music from Collins' song "In the Air Tonight".

== Songwriting discography ==
Below is a selection of songs written and produced by The Family.

Year	Artist	Title	Role	Notes
2012	Dada Life	Feed the Dada		
2013	Robin Stjernberg	You	Writer	In 2013 the song broke a Swedish record for most played song during one day. Swedish Grammy nominee for "Song of the Year" 2014. 3× Platinum in Sweden.
2013	Anton Ewald	Begging		
2014	Ace Wilder	Busy Doin' Nothin'	Writer	Nr 1 on "the Swedish Singles chart". Swedish Grammy nominee for song of the year in 2015. 3× Platinum in Sweden.”
2015	Fifth Harmony	Top Down	Writer & producer	First record on Reflection Album. The album hit nr 1 on US iTunes and entered at number 5 on the US ‘Billboard 200’. Album certified Gold in the US.
2015	Måns Zelmerlöw	Heroes	Writer & producer	Winner of ESC 2015. Nr 1 in 22 Countries. Sold 5× Platinum in Sweden. Gold in Spain, Norway and Austria. "Heroes" also peaked top 10 in 20 different countries, whereas in 5 of the countries it positioned nr.1.
2015	JoJo	Save My Soul	Writer & producer	The track reached No.3 on "the real-time Billboard + Twitter Trending 140" chart. It also peaked position 33 on US Billboards "Pop Digital Songs" chart.
2015	Nause	This is The World I Know		
2016	Ace Wilder	Don't Worry	Writer & producer	The song is featured in the trailer for Bridget Jones's Baby.
2016	Lisa Ajax	My Heart Wants Me Dead	Writer & producer	It took part in Melodifestivalen 2016. It peaked position no.10 on "the Swedish Single" chart
2016	SAARA	California		
2016	Kim Cesarion	Therapy		
2016	MiC LOWRY	Oh Lord	Writer & producer	MiC LOWRY's debut single.
2017	Lisa Ajax	I don't give A	Writer & producer	Melodifestivalen 2017
2017	Loreen	Statements	Writer & producer	Melodifestivalen 2017
2017	The Fo&O	Love like this	Writer & producer	
2017	Iggy Azalea feat. Anitta	Switch	Writer & producer	
