= Will Hicks (music producer) =

British record producer (born 1984)

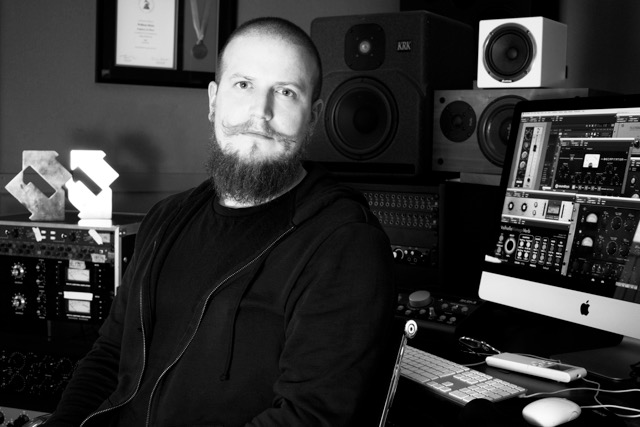
- Will Hicks in his studio

Background information
- Born: William Hicks; 1984 (age 41–42); Eardisland, England
- Occupations: Record producer, musician, songwriter
- Instruments: Guitar, bass, keyboards, drums, vocals
- Years active: 2011–present

Will Hicks is a British record producer, songwriter and musician most noted for his work with Jamie Lawson and Ed Sheeran.

== Early life ==
Will Hicks was born and grew up in the English county of Herefordshire. He started playing guitar at the age of 10, picking up bass and piano soon after. He joined his first band aged 12, though aged 16 he was pushed towards music production after falling in love with the recording process at a friend's father's studio and realising the much greater satisfaction producing gave him compared with performing on stage.

== Production, mixing and engineering work ==
After college, Hicks worked as a session guitarist and sound engineer in London for some time before working in artist development and production for Elton John's Rocket Music Studios in London's Kensington and New York. Over the years, Hicks worked with a vast variety of musicians such as Lily Allen, James Blunt, One Direction and Ed Sheeran as record producer and recording mix engineer. His work in artist development for 21st Century Management and Rocket Music Management also resulted in the discovery of and work with Anne-Marie and Bastille.

In 2014, Will Hicks's work vocal editing and engineering songs on Ed Sheeran's multi-Platinum certified album "x" earned him a Grammy nomination in the "Album of the Year" category of 2014.

In 2015, Hicks produced Jamie Lawson's self-titled debut release Jamie Lawson on Sheeran's own Gingerbread Man Records label. The album charted at number 1 on the UK Albums Chart and was certified Gold. Its lead single was the UK Top 10 charting "Wasn't Expecting That", which was certified Platinum as well as winning Best Song (Musically and Lyrically) at the 2016 Ivor Novello Awards.

In 2017 Will Hicks produced Ed Sheeran's hit single "Perfect" from the album ÷ as well as the follow-up digital release of the duet version with Beyoncé. The album was nominated for Best Pop Vocal Album at the 60th Annual Grammy Awards.

Hicks's approach to production has earned him the reputation of being "a singer's producer", dedicating an unusual amount of time to the vocal production of a track, "framing a voice with instruments and pieces of music to make people feel the emotion of a song". Parallels have been drawn to the work of Swedish record producer Bo Tretow and Pharrell Williams. His method developed from his early career when, long before working with famous musicians, he would "record anyone for free" to learn through trial and error and hone his recording method.

== Selected discography ==
List of singles as either producer or co-producer, with selected chart positions and certifications, showing year released, performing artists and album name
Year	Title	Peak chart positions										Certifications	Album
Year	Title	US	US Cont	AUS	BEL (FL)	CAN	DEN	FRA	NLD	SWE	UK	Certifications	Album
2017	"Perfect" (Ed Sheeran)	1	10	1	1	—	—	1	1	1	1	Australia (ARIA) 3× Platinum; Belgium (BEA) 2× Platinum; Canada (Music Canada) Platinum; Denmark (IFPI Denmark) Platinum; France (SNEP) Platinum; Germany (BVMI) Platinum; Ireland (IRMA) 2× Platinum; Italy (FIMI) 4× Platinum; New Zealand (RMNZ) 2× Platinum; Spain (PROMUSICAE) Platinum; Sweden (GLF) Platinum; UK (BPI) Platinum; USA (RIAA) 2× Platinum	÷
2017	"Perfect Duet" (Ed Sheeran & Beyoncé)	1	10	—	1	1	—	—	1	1	—		non-album single
2016	"Miss You" (James Hersey)	–	—	—	—	—	—	—	—	—	—	Canada (Music Canada) Gold; Italy (FIMI) Gold	Digital download
2016	"Someone for Everyone" (Jamie Lawson)	–	–	—	—	—	—	–	–	–	–		Jamie Lawson
2016	"Don't Let Me Go" (Jamie Lawson)	–	–	—	—	—	—	–	–	–	–		Jamie Lawson
2015	"Wasn't Expecting That" (Jamie Lawson)	–	16	3	7	—	—	97	–	–	6	UK (BPI) Platinum	Jamie Lawson
2015	"Ahead of Myself" (Jamie Lawson)	–	–	59	—	—	—	–	–	–	–		Jamie Lawson
2015	"Cold in Ohio" (Jamie Lawson)	–	–	—	—	—	—	–	–	–	–		Jamie Lawson
2015	Where We Belong (EP) (Jake Isaac)	–	–	—	—	—	—	–	–	–	–		Where We Belong
"—" denotes a recording that did not chart or was not released in that territory.

Selected other music credits
Year	Artist	Title	Label	Credit
2018	Jeremy Loops	Critical as Water	Sheer Sound	Producer
2017	James Blunt	The Afterlove	Atlantic	Drum programming, engineer, background vocals
2017	James Blunt	"Make Me Better"	Atlantic	Drum programming, engineer
2017	Sad Lovers & Giants	Where the Light Shines Through the Bigger Picture 1981-2017	Composer	
2017	Tor Miller	"Loving Hold"	Glassnote	Producer
2016	Sad Lovers & Giants	Copacetic (The Part Time Punks Session)	Voight-Kampff Records	Keyboards
2015	Ed Sheeran	5	Self-released	Engineer, mixing
2014	Electric Würms	Musik, Die Schwer Zu Twerk	Bella Union, Warner	Group member, composer
2014	Lauren Aquilina	"Oceans"	Island	Mixing
2014	One Direction	Four	Columbia	Vocal engineer
2014	David Guetta	Listen	Parlophone	Vocal engineer
2014	James Blunt	"Miss America (Acoustic Version from Angel Studios)"	Atlantic	Mixing
2014	James Blunt	"Satellites (Acoustic Version from Angel Studios)"	Atlantic	Recording engineer
2014	Sandhja	"Hold Me"	Columbia	Composer
2013	James Blunt	Moon Landing	Atlantic	Mixing
2013	Lily Allen	"Somewhere Only We Know"	Parlophone	Strings arrangement
2011	Ed Sheeran	You Need Me EP	Atlantic, Asylum	Engineer, mixing
2011	James Blunt	"Make Me Better"	Atlantic	Drum programming, engineer, background vocals
