= Norma John =

Finnish music duo

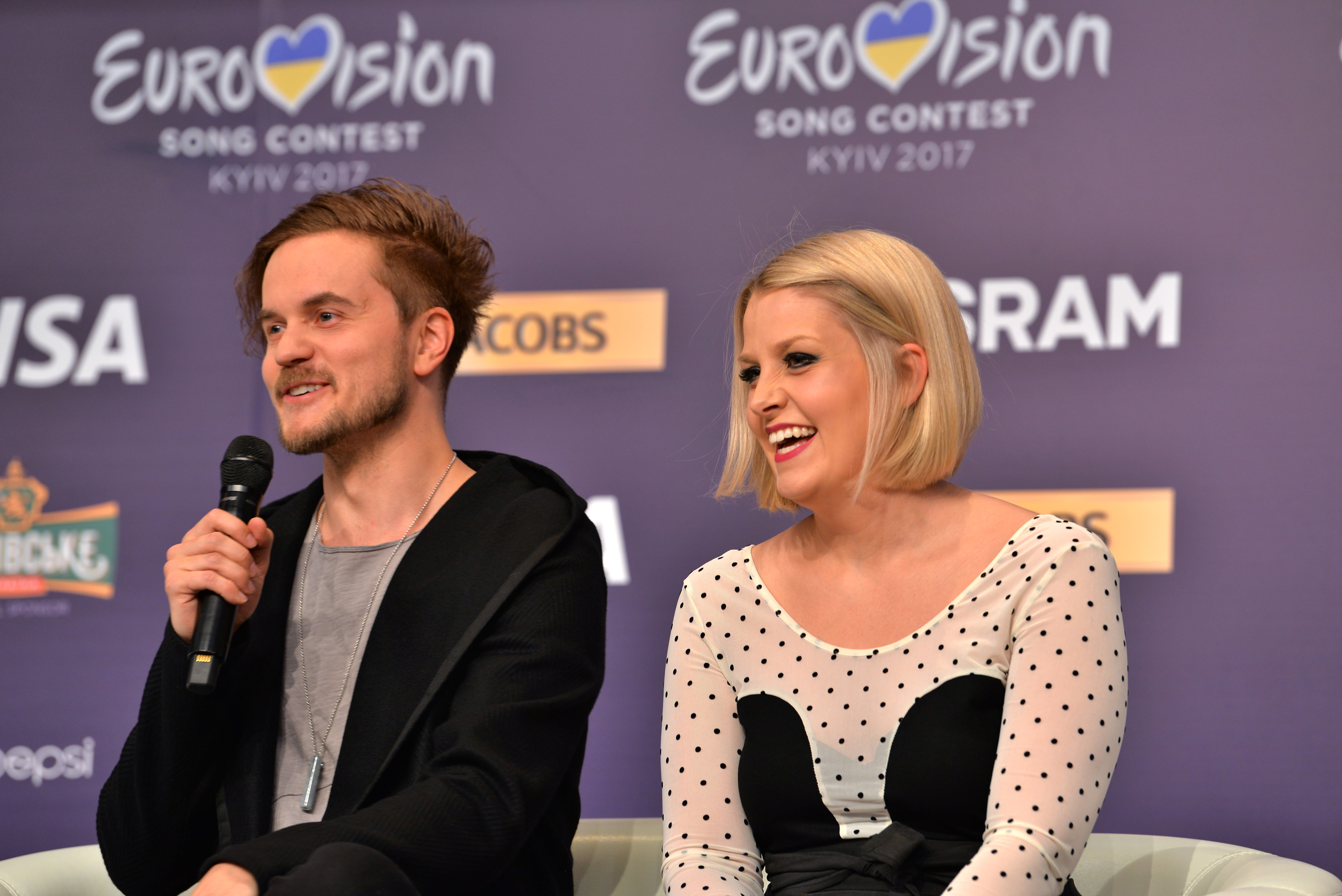
- Norma John in 2017

Background information
- Origin: Kouvola, Finland
- Genres: Alternative; indie pop
- Years active: 2008–present
- Members: Lasse Piirainen; Leena Tirronen

Norma John is a Finnish pop music duo consisting of pianist Lasse Piirainen and vocalist Leena Tirronen. Tirronen previously placed third on season one of X Factor Suomi. They represented Finland in the Eurovision Song Contest 2017, with the song "Blackbird" but failed to qualify to the final.

== Discography ==
=== Singles ===
| Title | Year | Peak chart positions | | | Album |
| Title | Year | FIN | FIN DL | FIN Air | Album |
|---|---|---|---|---|---|
| "Blackbird" | 2016 | — | 10 | 27 | Non-album singles |
| "Hellfire" | 2018 | — | — | — | Non-album singles |
"—" denotes a recording that did not chart or was not released in that territory.

=== As featured artist ===
| Title | Year | Album |
|---|---|---|
| "Wild Eyes" (Kasia Moś featuring Norma John) | 2018 | Wszystko to czego nie da się powiedzieć |

=== Television ===
| Title | Year | Notes |
|---|---|---|
| Eurovision Song CZ | 2018 | International jury member |

Awards and achievements
| Preceded by Sandhja with "Sing It Away" | Finland in the Eurovision Song Contest; 2017 | Succeeded by Saara Aalto with "Monsters" |
