= Wasn't Expecting That (album) =

Studio album by Jamie Lawson
- Released: 1 April 2011
- Recorded: 2010
- Genre: Pop
- Length: 48:26
- Label: Lookout Mountain

Jamie Lawson chronology
Wasn't Expecting That (2011)	Jamie Lawson (2015)

Singles from Jamie Lawson
- 1. "Wasn't Expecting That" Released: 11 March 2011; 2. "Lucky Rocks" Released: 2011

Wasn't Expecting That is the third studio album by English singer-songwriter Jamie Lawson. It was released on 1 April 2011 through Lookout Mountain Records and reached number 11 on the Irish Albums Chart. The album's title track "Wasn't Expecting That" was later included on Lawson's self-titled fourth album in 2015.

== Track listing ==
All tracks are written by Jamie Lawson, except where noted

Wasn't Expecting That – Standard edition
No.	Title	Writer(s)	Length
1.	"The Last Time"	Jamie Lawson; Adam Argyle	3:36
2.	"This Is Love"		3:42
3.	"Wasn't Expecting That"		3:39
4.	"Moving In"		3:54
5.	"Real Thing"		3:32
6.	"Seven"		3:58
7.	"The Touch of Your Hand"		3:18
8.	"Lucy Rocks"		3:15
9.	"North Shore"		3:18
10.	"Love You All the Same"		3:54
11.	"A Darkness"		4:16
12.	"I'm Gonna Love You"		4:25
13.	"Wasn't Expecting That (Original Single Version)"		3:15
Total length:			48:26
