= Gold (Sandhja song) =

Single by Sandhja

from the album Gold
- Released: 7 March 2014
- Recorded: 2012/13
- Genre: Pop
- Length: 3:24
- Label: Sony Music Entertainment Finland
- Songwriter(s): Hillary Beth Bernstein, Sandhja, Petri Sakari Matara, Gabriel Rene

Sandhja singles chronology
"Hold Me" (2014)	"Gold" (2014)	"The Flavor" (2015)

"Gold" is a song performed by Finnish singer Sandhja. The song was released as a digital download on 7 March 2014, through Sony Music Entertainment Finland as the second single from her debut studio album Gold (2014). The song peaked to number 71 on the Finnish Airplay Chart.

== Music video ==
A music video to accompany the release of "Gold" was first released onto YouTube on 23 April 2014 at a total length of three minutes and fifty seconds.

== Track listing ==
Digital download
No.	Title	Length
1.	"Gold"	3:24

== Chart performance ==
Chart (2014)	Peak position
Finland Airplay (Radiosoittolista)	71

== Release history ==
Region	Date	Format	Label
Finland	7 March 2014	Digital download	Sony Music Entertainment Finland
