= Finland in the Eurovision Song Contest 2017 =

- Eurovision Song Contest 2017
- Participating broadcaster: Yleisradio (Yle)
- Country: Finland
- Selection process: Uuden Musiikin Kilpailu 2017
- Selection date: 28 January 2017

Competing entry
- Song: "Blackbird"
- Artist: Norma John
- Songwriters: Lasse Piirainen; Leena Tirronen

Placement
- Semi-final result: Failed to qualify (12th)

Participation chronology

Finland was represented at the Eurovision Song Contest 2017 with the song "Blackbird", written and performed by Lasse Piirainen and Leena Tirronen under the name Norma John. The Finnish participating broadcaster, Yleisradio (Yle), organised the national final Uuden Musiikin Kilpailu 2017 in order to select its entry for the contest. Ten entries were selected to compete in the national final on 28 January 2017 where the 50/50 combination of votes from ten international jury groups and votes from the public selected "Blackbird" performed by Norma John as the winner.

Finland was drawn to compete in the first semi-final of the Eurovision Song Contest which took place on 9 May 2017. Performing during the show in position 7, "Blackbird" was not announced among the top 10 entries of the first semi-final and therefore did not qualify to compete in the final. It was later revealed that Finland placed twelfth out of the 18 participating countries in the semi-final with 92 points.

== Background ==
Prior to the 2017 contest, Yleisradio (Yle) had participated in the Eurovision Song Contest representing Finland fifty times since its first entry in 1961. It has won the contest once in 2006 with the song "Hard Rock Hallelujah" performed by Lordi. In 2016, "Sing It Away" performed by Sandhja failed to qualify Finland to the final, placing fifteenth in the semi-final.

As part of its duties as participating broadcaster, Yle organises the selection of its entry in the Eurovision Song Contest and broadcasts the event in the country. The broadcaster confirmed its intentions to participate at the 2017 contest on 15 May 2016. Yle had selected its entries for the contest through national final competitions that have varied in format over the years. Between 1961 and 2011, a selection show that was often titled Euroviisukarsinta highlighted that the purpose of the program was to select a song for Eurovision. However, since 2012, the broadcaster has organised the selection show Uuden Musiikin Kilpailu (UMK), which focuses on showcasing new music with the winning song being selected as the Finnish entry for that year. Along with its participation confirmation, the broadcaster also announced that its entry for the 2017 contest would be selected through Uuden Musiikin Kilpailu 2017.

== Before Eurovision ==
=== Uuden Musiikin Kilpailu 2017 ===
Uuden Musiikin Kilpailu 2017 was the sixth edition of Uuden Musiikin Kilpailu (UMK), the music competition that selects Finland's entries for the Eurovision Song Contest. The competition consisted of a final on 28 January 2017, held at the Espoo Metro Areena in Espoo and hosted by 2013 Finnish Eurovision entrant Krista Siegfrids. The show was broadcast on Yle TV2 with a second audio program providing commentary in Finnish by Mikko Silvennoinen. The competition was also broadcast online at Yle Areena and yle.fi/umk as well as via radio on Yle Radio Suomi and with commentary in Swedish by Eva Frantz and Johan Lindroos on Yle X3M.

==== Competing entries ====
A submission period was opened by Yle which lasted between 1 September 2016 and 5 September 2016. At least one of the writers and the lead singer(s) had to hold Finnish citizenship or live in Finland permanently in order for the entry to qualify to compete. A panel of experts appointed by Yle selected ten entries for the competition from the received submissions. The competing entries along with their lyric videos were presented during a live streamed press conference on 23 November 2016, hosted by Krista Siegfrids, while their promotional music videos were released on 28 December 2016. The competing entries were also presented in a televised preview programme on 31 December 2016, hosted by Mikko Silvennoinen, where a panel of guests consisting of Eini, Tuija Pehkonen, Jaana Pelkonen and Suvi Aalto discussed the artists and songs and selected "Paradise" performed by My First Band as having the best music video. Between 16 and 25 January 2017, each competing artist held a Facebook Live session online, the content of which was up to each artist.

Artist	Song	Songwriter(s)
Alva	"Arrows"	Arto Ruotsala, Milos Rosas, Aatu Mällinen
Anni Saikku	"Reach Out for the Sun"	Mia Kemppainen, Perttu Kurttila
Club La Persé	"My Little World"	Princess Julia, Luke Howard, Jaakko Salovaara
Emma	"Circle of Light"	Jonas Olsson, Heidi Maria Paalanen, Aku Rannila, Saara Törmä
Günther and D'Sanz	"Love Yourself"	Mats Söderlund, Amir Aly, Tomas Cederholm, Robin Abrahamsson, Niklas Nylund
Knucklebone Oscar and the Shangri-La Rubies	"Caveman"	Sami Baldauf, Oskari Martimo, Johannes Salomaa, Risto Kumpulainen, Sande Vettenranta, Ulrika Bachér, Ruska Schönberg,
Lauri Yrjölä	"Helppo elämä"	Lauri Yrjölä
My First Band	"Paradise"	Antti Koivula, Heikki Puhakainen, Heikki Kytölä, Juho Vehmanen, Mikko Virta, Jurek Reunamäki
Norma John	"Blackbird"	Lasse Piirainen, Leena Tirronen
Zühlke	"Perfect Villain"	Nalle Ahlstedt, Christian Ingebrigtsen, Silje Nymoen

==== Final ====
The final took place on 28 January 2017 where ten entries competed. "Blackbird" performed by Norma John was selected as the winner by a 50/50 combination of public votes and ten international jury groups from Estonia, France, Iceland, Israel, Latvia, Norway, Spain, Sweden, Ukraine and the United Kingdom. The viewers and the juries each had a total of 430 points to award. Each jury group distributed their points as follows: 1, 2, 4, 6, 8, 10 and 12 points. The viewer vote was based on the percentage of votes each song achieved through the following voting methods: telephone, SMS and online voting. For example, if a song gained 10% of the viewer vote, then that entry would be awarded 10% of 430 points rounded to the nearest integer: 43 points. The proceeds from the public voting were donated to the Nose Day Foundation (Nenäpäivä-säätiö), which funds projects in developing nations. In addition to the performances of the competing entries, the interval act featured Jenni Vartiainen performing her single "Turvasana", and Marcus and Martinus performing a medley of their songs.

Final – 28 January 2017
R/O	Artist	Song	Jury	Televote	Total	Place
1	Emma	"Circle of Light"	53	53	106	3
2	Alva	"Arrows"	15	48	63	6
3	Günther and D'Sanz	"Love Yourself"	37	45	82	5
4	Anni Saikku	"Reach Out for the Sun"	43	16	59	7
5	Knucklebone Oscar and the Shangri-La Rubies	"Caveman"	5	13	18	10
6	Norma John	"Blackbird"	94	88	182	1
7	Lauri Yrjölä	"Helppo elämä"	43	15	58	8
8	Club La Persé	"My Little World"	21	29	50	9
9	Zühlke	"Perfect Villain"	74	71	145	2
10	My First Band	"Paradise"	45	52	97	4

Detailed International Jury Votes
R/O	Song	France	Iceland	Estonia	Spain	Sweden	Latvia	United Kingdom	Norway	Israel	Ukraine	Total
R/O	Song	France	Iceland	Estonia	Spain	Sweden	Latvia	United Kingdom	Norway	Israel	Ukraine	Total
1	"Circle of Light"	12		1	8	10	2	10	2	6	2	53
2	"Arrows"			8	2	4				1		15
3	"Love Yourself"	2	10			8		6	8	2	1	37
4	"Reach Out for the Sun"	4	8		1		10	2	6	12		43
5	"Caveman"		1	2			1	1				5
6	"Blackbird"	10	12	12	12	6	12	12	10	4	4	94
7	"Helppo elämä"	1	2	4	4	12	4	4	4		8	43
8	"My Little World"		4			1				10	6	21
9	"Perfect Villain"	8	6	6	10		6	8	12	8	10	74
10	"Paradise"	6		10	6	2	8		1		12	45
International Jury Spokespersons
France – Edoardo Grassi; Iceland – Hera Ólafsdóttir; Estonia – Mart Normet; Spain – Federico Llano; Sweden – Edward af Sillén; Latvia – Zita Kaminska; United Kingdom – William Lee Adams; Norway – Hege Aarflot Nelvik; Israel – Alon Amir; Ukraine – Andrii Olefirov

=== Promotion ===
Norma John made several appearances across Europe to specifically promote "Blackbird" as the Finnish Eurovision entry. On 2 April, they performed during the London Eurovision Party, which was held at the Café de Paris venue in London, United Kingdom and hosted by Nicki French. Between 3 and 6 April, the Finnish duo took part in promotional activities in Tel Aviv, Israel where they performed during the Israel Calling event held at the Ha'teatron venue. On 8 April, Norma John performed during the Eurovision in Concert event which was held at the Melkweg venue in Amsterdam, Netherlands and hosted by Cornald Maas and Selma Björnsdóttir.

== At Eurovision ==
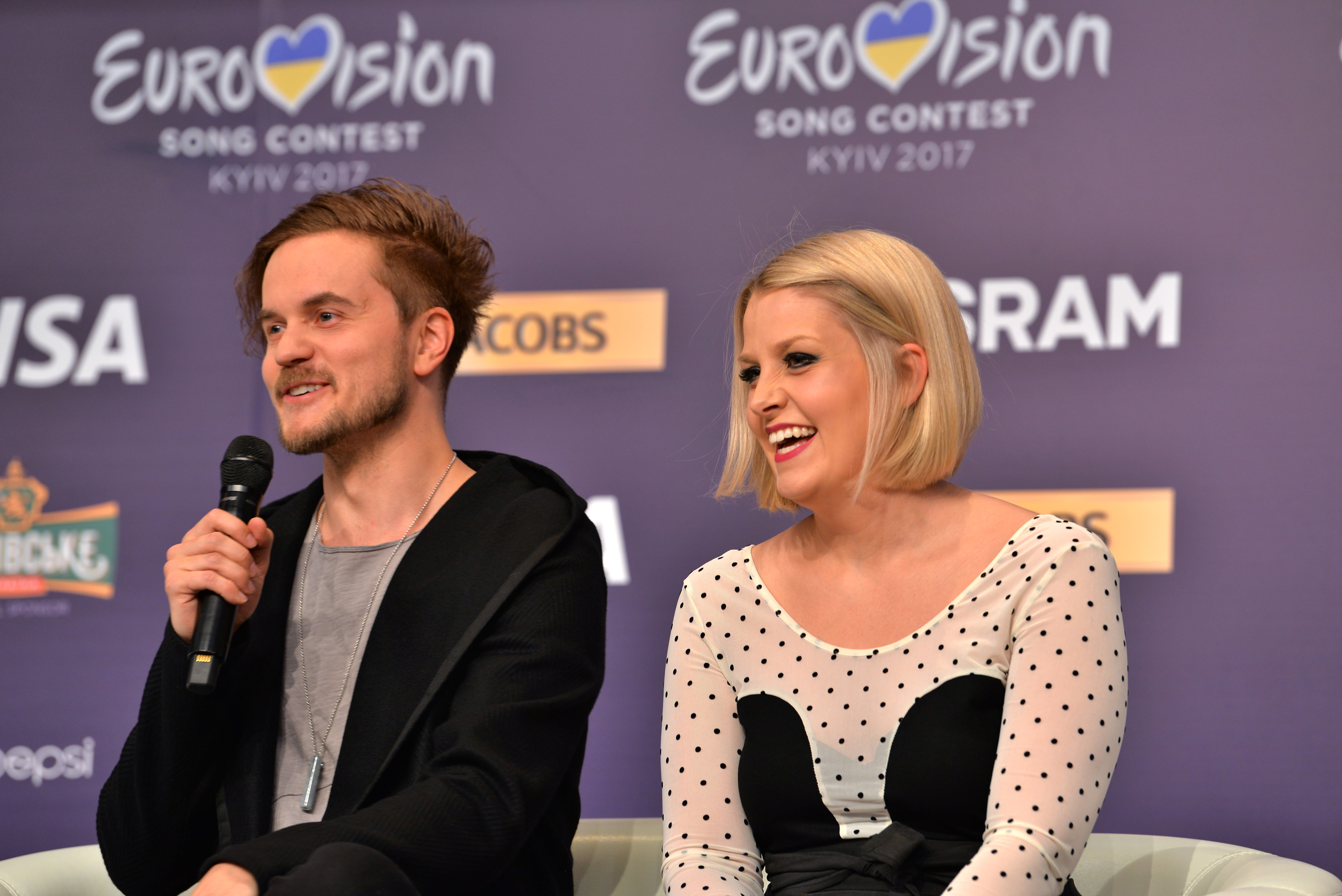
Norma John during a press meet and greet

According to Eurovision rules, all nations with the exceptions of the host country and the "Big Five" (France, Germany, Italy, Spain and the United Kingdom) are required to qualify from one of two semi-finals in order to compete for the final; the top ten countries from each semi-final progress to the final. The European Broadcasting Union (EBU) split up the competing countries into six different pots based on voting patterns from previous contests, with countries with favourable voting histories put into the same pot. On 31 January 2017, a special allocation draw was held which placed each country into one of the two semi-finals, as well as which half of the show they would perform in. Finland was placed into the first semi-final, held on 9 May 2017, and was scheduled to perform in the first half of the show.

Once all the competing songs for the 2017 contest had been released, the running order for the semi-finals was decided by the shows' producers rather than through another draw, so that similar songs were not placed next to each other. Finland was set perform in position 7, following the entry from Montenegro and before the entry from Azerbaijan.

The first semi-final was televised in Finland on Yle TV1, while the second semi-final and the final were televised on Yle TV2. All shows featured a second audio program providing commentary in Finnish by Mikko Silvennoinen and in Swedish by Eva Frantz and Johan Lindroos. The Finnish spokesperson, who announced the top 12-point score awarded by the Finnish jury during the final, was Jenni Vartiainen.

=== Semi-final ===
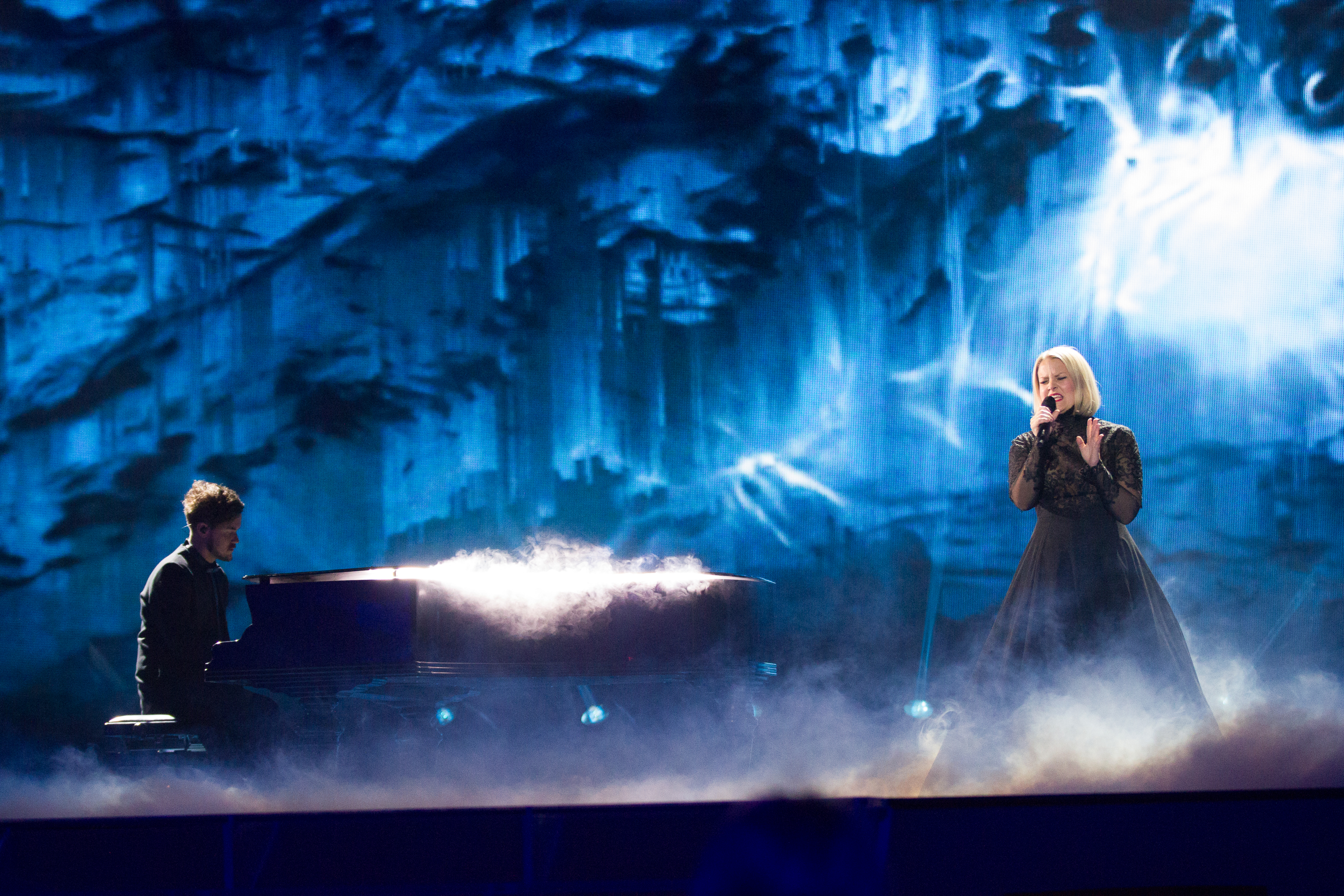
Norma John during a rehearsal before the first semi-final

Norma John took part in technical rehearsals on 30 April and 4 May, followed by dress rehearsals on 8 and 9 May. This included the jury show on 8 May where the professional juries of each country watched and voted on the competing entries.

The Finnish performance featured the members of Norma John both in black outfits; Leena Tirronen performed vocals and Lasse Piirainen played the piano which lit up with red and white colours from the inside. The LED screens transitioned from black and blue stormy imagery to red colours during the final chorus of the song with the stage floor displaying visuals reminiscent of water. The performance also featured smoke effects.

At the end of the show, Finland was not announced among the top 10 entries in the first semi-final and therefore failed to qualify to compete in the final. It was later revealed that Finland placed twelfth in the semi-final, receiving a total of 92 points: 51 points from the televoting and 41 points from the juries.

=== Voting ===
Voting during the three shows involved each country awarding two sets of points from 1-8, 10 and 12: one from their professional jury and the other from televoting. Each nation's jury consisted of five music industry professionals who are citizens of the country they represent, with their names published before the contest to ensure transparency. This jury judged each entry based on: vocal capacity; the stage performance; the song's composition and originality; and the overall impression by the act. In addition, no member of a national jury was permitted to be related in any way to any of the competing acts in such a way that they cannot vote impartially and independently. The individual rankings of each jury member as well as the nation's televoting results were released shortly after the grand final.

Below is a breakdown of points awarded to Finland and awarded by Finland in the first semi-final and grand final of the contest, and the breakdown of the jury voting and televoting conducted during the two shows:

==== Points awarded to Finland ====
Points awarded to Finland (Semi-final 1)
Score	Televote	Jury
12 points		
10 points		
8 points	Sweden	
7 points	Portugal	Australia; Portugal; Sweden
6 points		Cyprus; Slovenia
5 points	Albania; Latvia; Spain	
4 points	Poland	
3 points	Belgium; Czech Republic; Iceland; United Kingdom	Iceland; Moldova
2 points	Australia; Slovenia	
1 point	Greece	Czech Republic; Poland

==== Points awarded by Finland ====
Points awarded by Finland (Semi-final 1)
Score	Televote	Jury
12 points	Portugal	Sweden
10 points	Belgium	Portugal
8 points	Moldova	Australia
7 points	Sweden	Cyprus
6 points	Cyprus	Moldova
5 points	Iceland	Iceland
4 points	Armenia	Armenia
3 points	Montenegro	Georgia
2 points	Slovenia	Poland
1 point	Latvia	Slovenia

Points awarded by Finland (Final)
Score	Televote	Jury
12 points	Portugal	Sweden
10 points	Belgium	Australia
8 points	Italy	Portugal
7 points	Bulgaria	Italy
6 points	Sweden	Bulgaria
5 points	Moldova	Cyprus
4 points	Hungary	Denmark
3 points	Romania	Moldova
2 points	Norway	United Kingdom
1 point	France	Norway

==== Detailed voting results ====
The following members will comprise the Finnish jury:

- Jonas Olsson (jury chairperson) – producer, songwriter
- Iisa Pajula – singer-songwriter
- Marcus Sjöström – music director
- Vicky Rosti – singer, represented Finland in the 1987 contest
- Kalle Mäkipelto – music producer

Detailed voting results from Finland (Semi-final 1)
R/O	Country	Jury							Televote	
R/O	Country	I. Pajula	J. Olsson	M. Sjöström	V. Rosti	K. Mäkipelto	Rank	Points	Rank	Points
01	Sweden	5	2	1	2	1	1	12	4	7
02	Georgia	14	6	3	13	7	8	3	17	
03	Australia	2	1	6	4	4	3	8	12	
04	Albania	11	17	12	16	13	16		16	
05	Belgium	3	16	10	12	10	11		2	10
06	Montenegro	15	14	17	14	16	17		8	3
07	Finland									
08	Azerbaijan	13	15	14	11	8	13		14	
09	Portugal	1	3	7	1	2	2	10	1	12
10	Greece	16	12	9	15	14	14		15	
11	Poland	8	13	2	10	11	9	2	11	
12	Moldova	17	5	5	3	9	5	6	3	8
13	Iceland	4	10	13	6	6	6	5	6	5
14	Czech Republic	7	11	16	9	12	12		13	
15	Cyprus	9	4	4	7	3	4	7	5	6
16	Armenia	10	9	8	8	5	7	4	7	4
17	Slovenia	6	8	11	5	15	10	1	9	2
18	Latvia	12	7	15	17	17	15		10	1

Detailed voting results from Finland (Final)
R/O	Country	Jury							Televote	
R/O	Country	I. Pajula	J. Olsson	M. Sjöström	V. Rosti	K. Mäkipelto	Rank	Points	Rank	Points
01	Israel	18	10	5	12	15	11		14	
02	Poland	21	24	11	19	23	22		22	
03	Belarus	17	6	23	23	19	21		17	
04	Austria	19	5	22	20	18	17		24	
05	Armenia	11	22	14	14	8	13		20	
06	Netherlands	16	9	17	7	16	12		16	
07	Moldova	23	7	13	4	7	8	3	6	5
08	Hungary	14	23	15	9	25	19		7	4
09	Italy	2	12	1	1	17	4	7	3	8
10	Denmark	13	8	12	10	10	7	4	21	
11	Portugal	1	3	10	2	3	3	8	1	12
12	Azerbaijan	25	11	18	15	14	16		18	
13	Croatia	26	18	26	6	11	20		11	
14	Australia	3	1	3	5	4	2	10	15	
15	Greece	22	26	19	24	22	26		23	
16	Spain	24	14	16	22	9	18		26	
17	Norway	9	19	9	11	6	10	1	9	2
18	United Kingdom	8	13	8	13	12	9	2	13	
19	Cyprus	15	15	7	8	2	6	5	12	
20	Romania	12	17	24	25	26	24		8	3
21	Germany	7	16	20	16	20	15		25	
22	Ukraine	20	21	25	26	13	25		19	
23	Belgium	6	20	6	17	24	14		2	10
24	Sweden	5	2	2	3	1	1	12	5	6
25	Bulgaria	4	4	4	18	5	5	6	4	7
26	France	10	25	21	21	21	23		10	1
