= Perfect (Ed Sheeran song) =

2017 single by Ed Sheeran

Single by Ed Sheeran

from the album ÷
- Released: 26 September 2017
- Genre: Pop; soft rock; sunshine pop
- Length: 4:23
- Label: Asylum; Atlantic
- Songwriter: Ed Sheeran
- Producers: Ed Sheeran; Will Hicks

Ed Sheeran singles chronology
"Galway Girl" (2017)	"Perfect" (2017)	"Boa Me" (2017)

Music video
- "Perfect" on YouTube

"Perfect" is a song by English singer-songwriter Ed Sheeran from his third studio album, ÷ (2017). After the album's release, it charted at number four on the UK Singles Chart. On 21 August 2017, Billboard announced that "Perfect" would be the fourth single from the album. The song was serviced to pop radio on 26 September 2017 as the third single from the album in the United States (fourth overall). The second version of the single, titled "Perfect Duet", with American singer Beyoncé, was released on 1 December 2017. Another duet with Italian singer Andrea Bocelli, titled "Perfect Symphony", was released on 15 December 2017.

Originally peaking at number four in March 2017, the song re-entered the UK Singles Chart later that year. After the publication of "Duet" version the song reached number one on the UK Chart in December 2017. For the high sales of its version compared to the original one, Beyoncé was credited on several official sales charts, becoming her sixth Billboard Hot 100 number one song and Sheeran's second. The song also peaked at number one in 26 other countries, including Australia, Canada, Ireland, Malaysia, New Zealand, Singapore, and many European and Latin American countries.

The original song's official music video received three nominations at the 2018 MTV Video Music Awards.

== Composition and production ==
"Perfect" was the first track Ed Sheeran wrote for his third studio album ÷.

The song is a romantic ballad focusing on traditional marriage, written about his wife-to-be Cherry Seaborn, whom he knew from school and then reconnected with when she was working in New York. Sheeran revealed that the inspiration for the lyrics came after visiting James Blunt's house in Ibiza, where the two singers had listened to the rapper Future's music at six in the morning. He said: "Barefoot on the grass, listening to our favourite song, which happened to be Future's 'March Madness'... I booked the studio for the day, and I had that and I was like, right, let me just flesh that out. And the song happened and was sort of finished that day. I knew it was special."

Sheeran produced the song himself with help from Will Hicks. It was recorded with strings orchestration from his brother Matthew Sheeran. This is the first time the brothers had collaborated on a song, as it was a suggestion from their grandmother to see the brothers working together shortly before she died. The full string orchestration was later used for the recording with Andrea Bocelli. Another version with slightly different lyrics featuring Camila Cabello and Nicholas Galitzine is included in the Cinderella (2021 soundtrack).

The song is written in the key of A♭ major (G major in live performances) with a tempo of 190 beats per minute in 12/8 time (if not using triplets), or 63.33 beats per minute in 4/4 time (if using triplets). "Perfect" moves at a chord progression of A♭^{5}–Fm^{7}–D♭^{sus2}–E♭. The vocals span from E♭_{3} to A♭_{4} in the song.

In September 2023, when asked by a journalist which of his songs he thought would become his "Yesterday" (i.e., the song that "would define his oeuvre"), Sheeran replied, "Perfect".

== Commercial performance ==
=== United Kingdom ===
In March 2017, Sheeran broke the record set by Frankie Laine in 1953, occupying all of the top five positions in the United Kingdom, and placing nine songs in the top ten of the UK Singles Chart. Also, every single one of the sixteen tracks from his new album ÷ entered the top twenty. "Perfect" peaked at number four and the song debuted at that position, selling 62,599 copies. After Sheeran's performance of "Perfect" on The X Factor on 26 November 2017, the song reached a new peak in the UK, advancing to number three and selling 32,507 units. The Beyoncé version, released on 1 December 2017, drove consumption of the track to 89,359 sales (including 45,460 from sales-equivalent streams) as it became Sheeran's second number-one song from ÷, following "Shape of You" – and his fourth number-one single in total.

With UK sales of 1,048,313, "Perfect" became Sheeran's tenth million-selling single. It became 2017's Christmas number one single on 22 December 2017. It beat the likes of Wham!, Eminem ft. Ed Sheeran, Clean Bandit ft. Julia Michaels (Clean Bandit had reached the previous year's Christmas number one with "Rockabye"), The Pogues ft. Kirsty MacColl, Rita Ora and Mariah Carey to the Christmas number one spot and held the summit for six consecutive weeks before being displaced by Eminem's "River", which features Sheeran as a guest artist. It was formerly the song with the most weeks on the UK top 75. It has since been broken by Lewis Capaldi's "Someone You Loved".

=== United States ===
In the United States, ten songs from ÷ debuted on the Billboard Hot 100 in March 2017, including "Perfect" at number thirty-seven. In October, the song ascended to number eighteen and became the third song from ÷ to reach the country's top twenty. It also lifted 4–3 on Digital Songs (50,000 downloads sold), 34–30 on Radio Songs (45 million) and 46–35 on Streaming Songs (11.5 million). On 30 October 2017, "Perfect" soared to the top ten on the Billboard Hot 100. The ballad gained in all metrics, holding at number three on Digital Song Sales (53,000, up 7 percent) and climbing 30–22 on Radio Songs (53 million, up 16 percent) and 35–27 on Streaming Songs (13.1 million, up 14 percent).

On 20 November 2017, "Perfect" pushed to a new Billboard Hot 100 high (8–7) and reached the Radio Songs top ten (17–10; 73 million, up 16 percent). Sheeran scored his seventh Radio Songs top ten and the third from his album ÷, following "Shape of You" and "Castle on the Hill". The next week, "Perfect" hit top five on the Billboard Hot 100, becoming the second-highest-charting hit from his album ÷, following "Shape of You". "Perfect" became Sheeran's third top five hit overall; his first, "Thinking Out Loud", rose to number two in 2015. "Perfect" remained at number three on Digital Song Sales (60,000, down 6 percent) and powered 10–6 on Radio Songs (80 million, up 10 percent) and 38–15 on Streaming Songs (18.9 million, up 61 percent).

On 4 December 2017, "Perfect" pushed to a new number three Billboard Hot 100 high, and became Sheeran's third number one on Digital Song Sales (69,000, down 1 percent). He previously topped the chart for a week in 2015 with "Thinking Out Loud" and for ten weeks earlier in 2017 with "Shape of You". "Perfect" reached number one on Digital Song Sales, aided by the first few hours of tracking for its duet version, released before the end of the sales (and streaming) tracking week at 7 p.m. ET on 30 November. For the full week, the Beyoncé version accounted for 18 percent of the song's sales.

On 11 December 2017, after a full tracking week, the single topped the Billboard Hot 100 chart, becoming Sheeran's second number-one song in the United States and Beyoncé's sixth as a solo act. "Perfect" remained at number-one on the Digital Songs chart with sales of 181,000 copies (up 202 percent). The duet version accounted for 63 percent of the song's total sales for the week. "Perfect" also rose 11–3 on the Streaming Songs chart with 34.9 million US streams, up 87 percent, while on Radio Songs, it pushed 4–3 (102 million in audience, up 14 percent). The duet topped the Hot 100 for five weeks. The original version of the song would later take over at the top on the week ending 20 January 2018. After six total weeks at number one, the song was dethroned by "Havana" by Camila Cabello featuring Young Thug. "Perfect" was the seventh best-selling song of 2017 in the US, with 1,340,000 copies sold that year. It was the best-selling song of 2018, with 1,300,000 copies sold.

=== International charts ===
The original version peaked at number one in Austria, Belgium, France, Luxembourg, Malaysia, Netherlands, Philippines, Poland, Scotland, Slovakia, Slovenia, Switzerland and the United Kingdom. After the Beyoncé duet release, "Perfect" also reached number one in Australia, Denmark, Germany, Italy, New Zealand, Sweden and the United States. Sales of the original version along with sales of the duet version with Beyoncé and Andrea Bocelli also attributed to the song reaching number 1 in the UK in late 2017. The song is Sheeran's fourth to reach number one in Australia, and held the country's top spot for eight consecutive weeks before "God's Plan" by Drake displaced it. In April 2023, it which clocks up its 312th week within The Australian top 100, the longest ever chart song in Australian Chart history. It went to number one as well in Canada, becoming Sheeran's second number one there and Beyoncé's first. As of 3 January 2019, the song has sold 207,000 digital copies in Canada.

== Music video ==
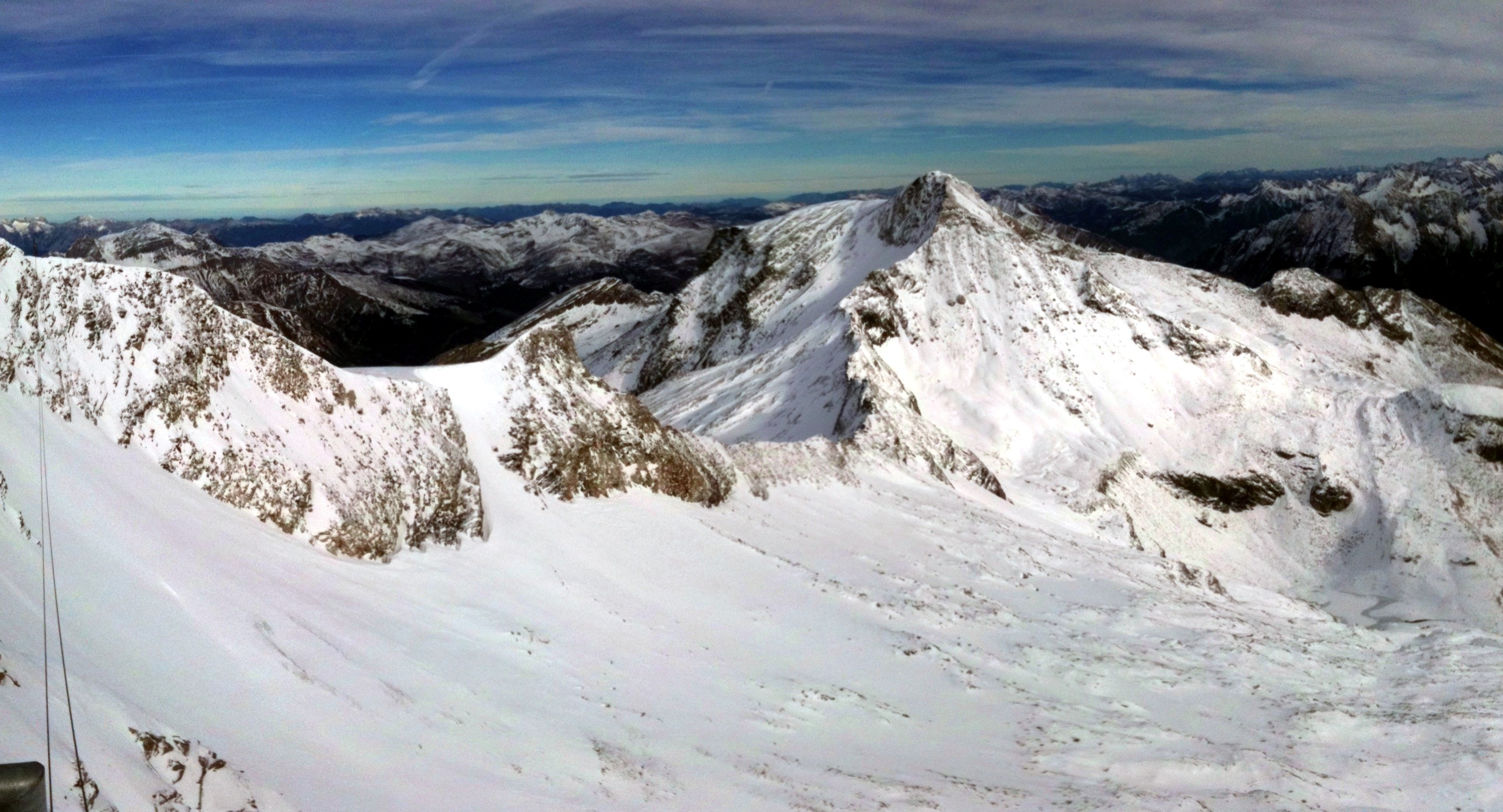
The video for "Perfect" narrates a romantic story that happened in the Hintertux Mountains, Austria

On 22 September 2017, a lyric video for "Perfect" was released on Sheeran's YouTube channel. The music video for "Perfect" was released on Sheeran's YouTube channel on 9 November 2017. The video stars Zoey Deutch and was directed by Jason Koenig, who also directed the video for "Shape of You". The video was filmed at the Austrian ski resort of Hintertux Glacier and shows Sheeran and Deutch going on a ski trip with friends, with the two dancing in the snow and ending up in a cabin together.

Ross McNeilage, who writes for MTV UK, called the video a "Christmas dream" for its wintery visual. While praising the simple story and the video's cinematography, McNeilage noted that Zoey Deutch acts opposite to the superstar as his love interest and we watch as they "coyly flirt until they realise their love for one another and slow dance in the snow together." As of March 2026, the music video has received over 4.1 billion views on YouTube, making it the 25th most viewed video on the site. It received nominations for Song of the Year, Best Pop Video and Best Direction at the 2018 MTV Video Music Awards.

== Releases ==
In November 2017, Sheeran released an acoustic version of "Perfect" and two remixes by Mike Perry and Robin Schulz.

== Formats and track listings ==
Digital download
No.	Title	Length
1.	"Perfect"	4:23

Digital download – acoustic
No.	Title	Length
1.	"Perfect" (acoustic)	4:20

Digital download – Mike Perry remix
No.	Title	Length
1.	"Perfect" (Mike Perry remix)	3:41

Digital download – Robin Schulz remix
No.	Title	Length
1.	"Perfect" (Robin Schulz remix)	4:09

German CD single
No.	Title	Length
1.	"Perfect"	4:23
2.	"Perfect" (acoustic)	4:20

== Credits and personnel ==
- Ed Sheeran – lead and backing vocals, acoustic guitar
- Laurie Anderson, Meghan Cassidy, Rachel Roberts, and Kotono Sato – viola
- Mandhira De Saram, Matthew Denton, Martyn Jackson, Magnus Johnston, Marije Johnston, Simon Hewitt Jones, Patrick Kiernan, and Jan Regulski – violin I
- Fenella Barton, James Dickenson, Alison Dods, Kirsty Mangan, Jeremy Morris, and Deborah Widdup – violin II
- Leon Bosch – double bass
- Nick Cartledge – flute and piccolo
- Nick Cooper, Katherine Jenkinson, and Tim Lowe – cello
- Charys Green – clarinet
- Will Hicks – electric guitar, percussion, and programming
- Jay Lewis – drums
- Pino Palladino – bass
- Matthew Sheeran – string arrangements
- Hilary Skewes – coordination
- John Tilley – piano and Hammond organ

== Charts ==
=== Weekly charts ===
Weekly chart performance
Chart (2017–2025)	Peak position
Argentina Anglo Airplay (Monitor Latino)	7
Australia (ARIA)	1
Austria (Ö3 Austria Top 40)	1
Belgium (Ultratop 50 Flanders)	1
Belgium (Ultratop 50 Wallonia)	1
Bolivia Airplay (Monitor Latino)	12
Brazil Airplay (Top 100 Brasil)	1
Bulgaria Airplay (PROPHON)	5
Canada Hot 100 (Billboard)	1
Canada AC (Billboard)	1
Canada CHR/Top 40 (Billboard)	1
Canada Hot AC (Billboard)	1
CIS Airplay (TopHit)	47
Colombia Airplay (National-Report)	33
Croatia International Airplay (Top lista)	8
Costa Rica Airplay (Monitor Latino)	17
Czech Republic Airplay (ČNS IFPI)	1
Czech Republic Singles Digital (ČNS IFPI)	4
Dominican Republic Streaming (SODINPRO)	35
Ecuador Airplay (National-Report)	3
El Salvador Airplay (Monitor Latino)	6
Estonia Airplay (TopHit)	72
Euro Digital Songs (Billboard)	1
Finland (Suomen virallinen lista)	13
France (SNEP)	1
Germany (GfK)	1
Global 200 (Billboard)	30
Greece Digital (Billboard)	1
Greece Airplay (IFPI)	11
Guatemala Airplay (Monitor Latino)	19
Hungary (Rádiós Top 40)	2
Hungary (Single Top 40)	1
Hungary (Stream Top 40)	1
Hungary (Dance Top 40)	14
Iceland (Tónlistinn)	1
Ireland (IRMA)	1
Israel International Airplay (Media Forest)	2
Italy (FIMI)	1
Japan Hot 100 (Billboard)	66
Latvia Streaming (DigiTop100)	14
Lebanon (Lebanese Top 20)	4
Luxembourg Digital (Billboard)	1
Malaysia (RIM)	1
Mexico Airplay (Billboard)	5
Netherlands (Dutch Top 40)	1
Netherlands (Mega Top 50)	1
Netherlands (Single Top 100)	1
New Zealand (Recorded Music NZ)	1
Norway (VG-lista)	4
Paraguay Airplay (Monitor Latino)	16
Philippines (Philippine Hot 100)	1
Poland Airplay (ZPAV)	1
Portugal (AFP)	5
Romania Airplay (TopHit)	77
Russia Airplay (TopHit)	64
Scottish Singles Sales (Official Charts)	1
Singapore (RIAS)	1
Slovakia Airplay (ČNS IFPI)	1
Slovakia Singles Digital (ČNS IFPI)	4
Slovenia Airplay (SloTop50)	1
South Korea International (Gaon)	36
Spain (Promusicae)	13
Sweden (Sverigetopplistan)	1
Switzerland (Schweizer Hitparade)	1
Ukraine Airplay (TopHit)	177
UK Singles (Official Charts)	1
Uruguay Airplay (Monitor Latino)	9
US Billboard Hot 100	1
US Adult Contemporary (Billboard)	1
US Adult Pop Airplay (Billboard)	1
US Dance Club Songs (Billboard)	32
US Dance Airplay (Billboard)	4
US Latin Pop Airplay (Billboard)	37
US Pop Airplay (Billboard)	1

=== Year-end charts ===
Year-end chart performance
Chart (2017)	Position
Australia (ARIA)	4
Austria (Ö3 Austria Top 40)	13
Belgium (Ultratop Flanders)	27
Belgium (Ultratop Wallonia)	62
Brazil (Pro-Música Brasil)	162
Canada (Canadian Hot 100)	53
Denmark (Tracklisten)	11
France (SNEP)	36
Germany (Official German Charts)	12
Hungary (Single Top 40)	8
Hungary (Stream Top 40)	34
Iceland (Tónlistinn)	5
Netherlands (Dutch Top 40)	33
Netherlands (Single Top 100)	24
Italy (FIMI)	9
New Zealand (Recorded Music NZ)	11
Poland (ZPAV)	55
Portugal (AFP)	49
Spain (PROMUSICAE)	56
Sweden (Sverigetopplistan)	7
Switzerland (Schweizer Hitparade)	20
UK Singles (OCC)	6

Year-end chart performance
Chart (2018)	Position
Argentina (Monitor Latino)	54
Australia (ARIA)	3
Austria (Ö3 Austria Top 40)	45
Belgium (Ultratop Flanders)	6
Belgium (Ultratop Wallonia)	5
Brazil (Crowley Broadcast Analysis)	63
Canada (Canadian Hot 100)	2
Denmark (Tracklisten)	1
France (SNEP)	12
Germany (Official German Charts)	2
Hungary (Dance Top 40)	44
Hungary (Rádiós Top 40)	12
Hungary (Single Top 40)	1
Iceland (Plötutíóindi)	14
Ireland (IRMA)	9
Italy (FIMI)	2
Japan Hot Overseas (Billboard Japan)	17
New Zealand (Recorded Music NZ)	2
Netherlands (Dutch Top 40)	32
Netherlands (Single Top 100)	7
Portugal (AFP)	45
Romania (Airplay 100)	35
Slovenia (SloTop50)	1
Spain (PROMUSICAE)	16
Switzerland (Schweizer Hitparade)	2
UK Singles (OCC)	6
US Billboard Hot 100	2
US Radio Songs (Billboard)	1
US Adult Contemporary (Billboard)	1
US Adult Top 40 (Billboard)	1
US Dance/Mix Show Airplay (Billboard)	13
US Mainstream Top 40 (Billboard)	4

Year-end chart performance
Chart (2019)	Position
Australia (ARIA)	58
Denmark (Tracklisten)	39
France (SNEP)	193
Hungary (Rádiós Top 40)	78
Hungary (Single Top 40)	11
Iceland (Tónlistinn)	63
Italy (FIMI)	91
Portugal (AFP)	154
Slovenia (SloTop50)	45
Sweden (Sverigetopplistan)	66
Switzerland (Schweizer Hitparade)	37
UK Singles (OCC)	46
US Adult Contemporary (Billboard)	13
US Rolling Stone Top 100	75

Year-end chart performance
Chart (2020)	Position
Australia (ARIA)	70
Denmark (Tracklisten)	77
Hungary (Single Top 40)	37
UK Singles (OCC)	57

Year-end chart performance
Chart (2021)	Position
Australia (ARIA)	52
Denmark (Tracklisten)	54
Global 200 (Billboard)	29
Hungary (Single Top 40)	24
UK Singles (OCC)	35

Year-end chart performance
Chart (2022)	Position
Australia (ARIA)	49
Denmark (Tracklisten)	83
Global 200 (Billboard)	31
Hungary (Single Top 40)	55
UK Singles (OCC)	50

Year-end chart performance
Chart (2023)	Position
Australia (ARIA)	63
Global 200 (Billboard)	38
UK Singles (OCC)	77

Year-end chart performance
Chart (2024)	Position
Global 200 (Billboard)	54

Year-end chart performance
Chart (2025)	Position
Global 200 (Billboard)	48

=== Decade-end charts ===
2010s-end chart performance for "Perfect"
Chart (2010–2019)	Position
Australia (ARIA)	8
Germany (Official German Charts)	5
Netherlands (Single Top 100)	20
UK Singles (Official Charts Company)	5
US Billboard Hot 100	15

== Certifications ==
Certifications
Region	Certification	Certified units/sales
Australia (ARIA)	16× Platinum	1,120,000^{‡}
Austria (IFPI Austria)	5× Platinum	150,000^{‡}
Belgium (BRMA)	4× Platinum	80,000^{‡}
Canada (Music Canada)	2× Diamond	1,600,000^{‡}
Denmark (IFPI Danmark)	8× Platinum	720,000^{‡}
France (SNEP)	Diamond	233,333^{‡}
Germany (BVMI)	7× Gold	1,400,000^{‡}
Italy (FIMI)	9× Platinum	450,000^{‡}
New Zealand (RMNZ)	14× Platinum	420,000^{‡}
Poland (ZPAV)	4× Diamond	1,000,000^{‡}
Portugal (AFP)	4× Platinum	40,000^{‡}
Spain (Promusicae)	8× Platinum	480,000^{‡}
Sweden (GLF)	Platinum	40,000^{‡}
Switzerland (IFPI Switzerland)	6× Platinum	120,000^{‡}
United Kingdom (BPI)	10× Platinum	6,000,000^{‡}
United States (RIAA)	13× Platinum	13,000,000^{‡}
Streaming
Japan (RIAJ)	Platinum	100,000,000^{†}
^{‡} Sales+streaming figures based on certification alone.^{†} Streaming-only figures based on certification alone.

== Release history ==
Release dates for "Perfect"
Region	Date	Format	Version	Label	Ref.
United States	26 September 2017	Contemporary hit radio	Original	Atlantic	
United States	2 October 2017	Hot adult contemporary radio	Original	Atlantic	
Italy	20 October 2017	Contemporary hit radio	Original	Warner	
Various	10 November 2017	Digital download	Acoustic	Atlantic	
Various	10 November 2017	Digital download	Mike Perry remix	Atlantic	
United Kingdom	17 November 2017	Contemporary hit radio	Original	Atlantic; Asylum	
Various	24 November 2017	Digital download	Robin Schulz remix	Atlantic	
Germany	24 November 2017	CD single	Original	Warner Music International	

== "Perfect Duet" version ==
"Perfect Duet"

Single by Ed Sheeran and Beyoncé
- Released: 1 December 2017
- Recorded: 11 May 2017
- Length: 4:19
- Label: Asylum; Atlantic
- Songwriters: Ed Sheeran; Beyoncé Knowles-Carter
- Producers: Ed Sheeran; Will Hicks

Ed Sheeran singles chronology
"End Game" (2017)	"Perfect Duet" (2017)	"River" (2017)

Beyoncé singles chronology
"Walk on Water" (2017)	"Perfect Duet" (2017)	"Top Off" (2018)

Audio video
- "Perfect Duet" on YouTube

On 1 December 2017, a duet by American singer Beyoncé titled "Perfect Duet" was made available worldwide. The version became a commercial success on international charts, increasing the sales of the song, peaking atop several charts including the Billboard Hot 100 and the Canadian Hot 100.

=== Composition and recording ===
The song is a stripped down, acoustic version of the original, with Beyoncé singing the second verse from a female perspective. Sheeran stated the song was Beyoncé's favorite from the album, and reached out to her to re-record the song. Beyoncé agreed, and the two recorded the song in May 2017. The song also has differences in instrumentation, with the use of acoustic guitar instead of the electric guitar in the original version.

=== Live performances ===
Beyoncé performed her verse as part of the setlist during the On the Run II Tour in 2018. On 2 December 2018, slightly over a year since the release of the duet version, Ed Sheeran and Beyoncé performed the first-ever live rendition of "Perfect Duet" at the 2018 Global Citizen Festival in Johannesburg, South Africa.

=== Critical reception ===
Nina Braca of Billboard wrote that the playing of the acoustic guitar helped the song to generate "a more intimate sound"; The writer affirmed that while Beyonce's "powerhouse" vocals "to help bring the song up a notch", when the two artist sing together they sound "harmonious".

=== Track listing ===
Digital download – duet with Beyoncé
No.	Title	Length
1.	"Perfect Duet" (with Beyoncé)	4:19

=== Charts ===
==== Weekly charts ====
Weekly chart performance
Chart (2017–2018)	Peak position
Austria (Ö3 Austria Top 40)	4
Belgium (Ultratop 50 Flanders)	1
Belgium (Ultratop 50 Wallonia)	1
Canada Hot 100 (Billboard)	1
Canada AC (Billboard)	2
Canada CHR/Top 40 (Billboard)	2
Canada Hot AC (Billboard)	1
Croatia International Airplay (Top lista)	1
Czech Republic Airplay (ČNS IFPI)	30
Czech Republic Singles Digital (ČNS IFPI)	5
Euro Digital Songs (Billboard)	1
Finland (Suomen virallinen lista)	11
Iceland (Tónlistinn)	1
Italy (Musica e dischi)	3
Latvia (DigiTop100)	16
Luxembourg Digital (Billboard)	1
Netherlands (Dutch Top 40)	1
Netherlands (Mega Top 50)	1
Netherlands (Single Top 100)	1
New Zealand (Recorded Music NZ)	1
Norway (VG-lista)	9
Philippines (Philippine Hot 100)	8
Poland Airplay (ZPAV)	61
Portugal (AFP)	3
Slovakia Singles Digital (ČNS IFPI)	3
Slovenia (SloTop50)	13
South Korea International Chart (Gaon)	8
Spain (PROMUSICAE)	2
Sweden (Sverigetopplistan)	1
US Billboard Hot 100	1
US Adult Contemporary (Billboard)	6
US Adult Pop Airplay (Billboard)	2
US Pop Airplay (Billboard)	2
US Rhythmic Airplay (Billboard)	18

=== Year-end charts ===
Year-end chart performance
Chart (2017)	Position
Netherlands (Dutch Top 40)	33
Spain (PROMUSICAE)	56
Sweden (Sverigetopplistan)	7

Year-end chart performance
Chart (2018)	Position
Netherlands (Dutch Top 40)	32
Portugal (AFP)	79
Sweden (Sverigetopplistan)	3

==== Decade-end charts ====
2010s-end chart performance for "Perfect Duet"
Chart (2010–2019)	Position
US Billboard Hot 100	15

=== Certifications ===
Certifications
Region	Certification	Certified units/sales
New Zealand (RMNZ)	2× Platinum	60,000^{‡}
Poland (ZPAV)	Platinum	50,000^{‡}
Portugal (AFP)	Platinum	10,000^{‡}
Spain (Promusicae)	7× Platinum	280,000^{‡}
Streaming
Sweden (GLF)	Platinum	8,000,000^{†}
^{‡} Sales+streaming figures based on certification alone.^{†} Streaming-only figures based on certification alone.

=== Release history ===
Release dates for duet
Region	Date	Format	Label	Ref.
Various	1 December 2017	Digital download	Atlantic	
Italy	1 December 2017	Contemporary hit radio	Warner	
United Kingdom	15 December 2017	Contemporary hit radio	Atlantic; Asylum	

== "Perfect Symphony" version ==
"Perfect Symphony"

Single by Ed Sheeran and Andrea Bocelli
- Language: English; Italian
- Released: 15 December 2017
- Genre: Classical crossover
- Length: 4:25
- Label: Asylum; Atlantic
- Songwriters: Ed Sheeran; Andrea Bocelli
- Producer: Matthew Sheeran

Ed Sheeran singles chronology
"River" (2017)	"Perfect Symphony" (2017)	"Happier" (2018)

Andrea Bocelli singles chronology
"E Più Ti Penso" (2015)	"Perfect Symphony" (2017)	"Fall on Me" (2018)

Music video
- "Perfect Symphony (with Andrea Bocelli)" on YouTube

An operatic version of "Perfect" with Andrea Bocelli, titled "Perfect Symphony" and sung partly in Italian, was released on 15 December 2017. Bocelli included this version on his 2024 compilation album Duets (30th Anniversary).

=== Composition ===
A fully orchestral version of the song was recorded at Abbey Road Studios although only parts of it were used in the original release of the song. The full orchestral version was used in the duet with Andrea Bocelli.

=== Music video ===
On 15 December 2017, a music video for "Perfect Symphony" was also released.

=== Track listing ===
Digital download – duet with Andrea Bocelli
No.	Title	Length
1.	"Perfect Symphony" (with Andrea Bocelli)	4:25

=== Charts ===
Weekly chart performance
Chart (2017–2018)	Peak position
Austria (Ö3 Austria Top 40)	26
Italy (Musica e dischi)	2
New Zealand (Recorded Music NZ)	1
Philippines (BillboardPH Hot 100)	18

2026 chart performance
Chart (2026)	Peak position
Colombia Anglo Airplay (National-Report)	8

=== Release history ===
Release dates for "Perfect Symphony"
Region	Date	Format	Label	Ref.
Various	15 December 2017	Digital download	Atlantic	
Italy	15 December 2017	Contemporary hit radio	Warner	

== See also ==
- List of best-selling singles in Australia
- List of best-selling singles in the United Kingdom
- List of number-one singles of 2017 (Australia)
- List of number-one singles of 2018 (Australia)
- List of number-one hits of 2017 (Austria)
- List of Ultratop 50 number-one singles of 2017
- List of Ultratop 50 number-one singles of 2018
- List of Canadian Hot 100 number-one singles of 2017
- List of Canadian Hot 100 number-one singles of 2018
- List of number-one songs of the 2010s (Czech Republic)
- List of number-one hits of 2017 (Denmark)
- List of number-one hits of 2018 (Denmark)
- List of Dutch Top 40 number-one singles of 2017
- List of Dutch Top 40 number-one singles of 2018
- List of number-one hits of 2017 (France)
- List of number-one hits of 2018 (France)
- List of number-one hits of 2017 (Germany)
- List of number-one hits of 2018 (Germany)
- List of number-one singles of 2017 (Ireland)
- List of number-one singles of 2018 (Ireland)
- List of number-one hits of 2017 (Italy)
- List of number-one hits of 2018 (Italy)
- List of number-one songs of 2017 (Malaysia)
- List of number-one songs of 2018 (Malaysia)
- List of Dutch Top 40 number-one singles of 2017
- List of Dutch Top 40 number-one singles of 2018
- List of number-one singles from the 2010s (New Zealand)
- List of number-one singles of 2017 (Poland)
- List of Scottish number-one singles of 2017
- List of Scottish number-one singles of 2018
- List of number-one songs of 2018 (Singapore)
- List of number-one singles of 2017 (Slovenia)
- List of number-one singles of 2018 (Slovenia)
- List of number-one singles of the 2010s (Sweden)
- List of number-one hits of 2017 (Switzerland)
- List of number-one hits of 2018 (Switzerland)
- List of UK Singles Chart number ones of the 2010s
- List of Billboard Hot 100 number-one singles of 2017
- List of Billboard Hot 100 number-one singles of 2018
- List of Billboard Adult Contemporary number ones of 2018
