= Jamie Lawson (album) =

Studio album by Jamie Lawson
- Released: 9 October 2015
- Recorded: 2015
- Genre: Pop
- Labels: Gingerbread Man; Atlantic
- Producer: Will Hicks

Jamie Lawson chronology
Wasn't Expecting That (2011)	Jamie Lawson (2015)	Happy Accidents (2017)

Singles from Jamie Lawson
- 1. "Wasn't Expecting That" Released: 3 April 2015; 2. "Ahead of Myself" Released: 7 August 2015; 3. "Cold in Ohio" Released: 2015; 4. "Don't Let Me Let You Go" Released: September 2016; 5. "Someone For Everyone" Released: 3 October 2016

Professional ratings
Review scores
Source	Rating
The Guardian	3/5 stars
HMV	(favorable)
The Independent	3/5 stars
Rolling Stone Australia	2.5/5 stars

Jamie Lawson is the fourth studio album by British singer-songwriter Jamie Lawson. It is also the first album to be released on Ed Sheeran's record label Gingerbread Man Records. On 17 July 2015, it was announced through Lawson's Twitter account that the self-titled album was available for pre-order on iTunes. The release of the album was pushed back by one week to 16 October 2015.

The album debuted at number one on the UK Albums Chart, beating Sheeran's album x to the top spot.

== History ==
In 2014, Lawson received a text from now-successful old acquaintance Ed Sheeran asking for him to open at a secret Dublin show. Sheeran later revealed he used Lawson's 2011 single "Wasn't Expecting That" for inspiration while recording "Afire Love" from his 2014 album x. After joining Sheeran on his 2013 UK and Europe Tour, it was announced that Lawson would be the first signee on Sheeran's newly founded record label Gingerbreadman Records.

Lawson's self-titled album was recorded in 2015, and promoted by a solo tour of Australia and New Zealand. Lawson said Sheeran's involvement with recording the album was minimal, stating he "left me to my own devices to make the record I wanted to make. He put me in touch with a producer who he had been working with and we went through the songs to pick which should be on the album." In the lead-up weeks to the release of the album, Lawson opened for One Direction during their tour of the UK, Ireland and the US.

== Singles ==
- "Wasn't Expecting That" was released as the lead single from the album on 3 April 2015. Originally included on Lawson's 2011 album of the same name, the song was re-released following his signing to Ed Sheeran's newly formed record label, Gingerbread Man Records. It peaked at number 3 on the Australian Singles Chart in 2015.
- "Ahead of Myself" was released as the second single from the album on 7 August 2015. Also generating positive reviews, the song peaked at number 59 on the Australian Singles Chart.
- "Cold in Ohio" was released as the third single from the album in September 2015.
- "Someone for Everyone" was released as the fifth single from the album on 12 May 2016.
- "Don't Let Me Let You Go" was released as the fourth (and final) single from the album on 21 September 2016.

== Promotional tour ==
Overview of concert dates to promote Jamie Lawson
Date	City	Country	Venue	Opening act	Attendance	Revenue
Europe
15 May 2015	Brigton	United Kingdom	SpiegelPub (Great Scape 2015)			
Oceania
22 August 2015	Perth	Australia	Jimmy's Den			
25 August 2015	Melbourne	Australia	Northcote Social Club			
26 August 2015	Melbourne	Australia	Northcote Social Club			
29 August 2015	Auckland	New Zealand	Tuning Fork			
North America
30 September 2015	Los Angeles	United States	The Hotel Café			
Europe
5 November 2015	London	United Kingdom	BBC Radio 1's Live Lounge			
6 November 2015	Wangels	Germany	Ferienpark Weissenhäuser Strand (Rolling Stone Weekender 2015)			
11 November 2015	Stockholm	Sweden	Debaser Hornstull Strand			
12 November 2015	Oslo	Norway	Parkteateret Scene			
14 November 2015	Berlin	Germany	Gretchen	Lee MacDougall	226 / 350	$3,684
15 November 2015	Leipzig	Germany	Neues Schaulpiel Leipzig			
16 November 2015	Munich	Germany	Orangehouse / Feierwerk	Lee MacDougall	194 / 250	$3,150
18 November 2015	Zürich	Switzerland	Exil	Lee MacDougall		
19 November 2015	Vienna	Austria	B72	Lee MacDougall		
21 November 2015	Stuttgart	Germany	1210	Lee MacDougall	207 / 250	$3,321
22 November 2015	Frankfurt	Germany	Nachtleben	Lee MacDougall	192 / 250	$3,084
23 November 2015	Cologne	Germany	Studio 672	Lee MacDougall	180 / 180	$2,874
25 November 2015	Brussels	Belgium	Le Botanique	Lee MacDougall		
26 November 2015	Paris	France	Les Étoiles	Lee MacDougall		
27 November 2015	London	United Kingdom	TFI Friday			
28 November 2015	Amsterdam	Netherlands	Bitterzoet	Lee MacDougall		
29 November 2015	Rotterdam	Netherlands	De Doelen			
7 December 2015	Borehamwood	United Kingdom	BBC Elstree Centre (Top of the Pops 2015)			
North America
9 December 2015	Boston	United States	House of Blues Boston			
13 December 2015	Lake Buena Vista	United States	House of Blues Orlando			
14 December 2015	Clearwater	United States	Ruth Eckerd Hall			
Europe
14 January 2016	Glasgow	United Kingdom	Queen Margaret Union			
North America
16 February 2016	Indianapolis	United States	Murat Theatre			
Oceania
9 April 2016	Perth	Australia	Astor Theatre	Ryan Keen		
12 April 2016	Adelaide	Australia	The Gov (Governor Hindmarsh Hotel)	Ryan Keen		
15 April 2016	Brisbane	Australia	The Triffid	Ryan Keen		
16 April 2016	Sydney	Australia	Metro Theatre	Ryan Keen		
19 April 2016	Melbourne	Australia	Corner Hotel	Ryan Keen		
Total					999 / 1,280	$16,113

== Track listing ==
Standard edition
No.	Title	Writer(s)	Length
1.	"Wasn't Expecting That"	Jamie Lawson	3:24
2.	"Someone for Everyone"	Lawson; Tim Ross	3:02
3.	"Cold in Ohio"	Lawson; Kim Richey	2:50
4.	"The Only Conclusion"	Lawson	3:30
5.	"Still Yours"	Lawson	3:56
6.	"All Is Beauty"	Lawson	2:45
7.	"Don't Let Me Let You Go"	Lawson; Amy Wadge	3:31
8.	"Ahead of Myself"	Lawson	3:44
9.	"In Our Own Worlds"	Lawson	3:59
10.	"Sometimes It's Hard"	Lawson	2:40
11.	"Let Love Hold You Now"	Lawson; Ross	3:26

== Personnel ==
Adapted from the album liner notes:

- Jamie Lawson – vocals, acoustic guitar, electric guitar, piano on "Cold in Ohio" and "Still Yours"
- Henrik Irgens – bass guitar
- Matt Racher – drums, percussion
- John Tilley – piano, Hammond organ, Mellotron, harmonium, Wurlitzer, glockenspiel
- Jack Birchwood – trumpet, flugelhorn, trombone
- Nik Carter – saxophone
- Ed Sheeran – backing vocals on "Cold in Ohio" and "Ahead of Myself"
- Bailey Tzuke – backing vocals on "The Only Conclusion"
- Will Hicks – percussion on "Wasn't Expecting That" and "Cold in Ohio", bass guitar on "Wasn't Expecting That", electric guitar on "Don't Let Me Let You Go"
- Fred Abbott – piano on "Wasn't Expecting That"
- Bernard Butler – guitar on "Someone for Everyone" and "Ahead of Myself"
- Ruadrhi Cushnan – guitar and percussion on "Someone for Everyone", "Cold in Ohio" and "Ahead of Myself"
- Josh Watkins, Will Hicks, Louise Astbury, Ania Smarzack, James Hicks – gang vocals on "Ahead of Myself"

Production personnel

- Will Hicks – Producer
- Oli Barton-Wood - Recording Engineer
- Stuart Hawkes – Mastering
- Ed Sheeran – A&R
- Ed Howard – A&R

== Charts and certifications ==
=== Weekly charts ===
Chart (2015–16)	Peak position
Australian Albums (ARIA)	4
Austrian Albums (Ö3 Austria)	44
Belgian Albums (Ultratop Wallonia)	137
Canadian Albums (Billboard)	86
German Albums (Offizielle Top 100)	19
Irish Albums (IRMA)	5
New Zealand Albums (RMNZ)	3
Scottish Albums (Official Charts)	1
UK Albums (Official Charts)	1
US Billboard 200	87
US Americana/Folk Albums (Billboard)	3

=== Year-end charts ===
Chart (2015)	Position
UK Albums Chart	76

=== Certifications ===
Region	Certification	Certified units/sales
United Kingdom (BPI)	Gold	100,000^{‡}
^{‡} Sales+streaming figures based on certification alone.

== Release history ==
Release history and formats for Jamie Lawson
Region	Date	Format	Label
Australia	9 October 2015	CD; digital download	Gingerbread Man Records
Ireland	16 October 2015	CD; digital download	Gingerbread Man Records
United Kingdom	16 October 2015	CD; digital download	Gingerbread Man Records
