= List of Dutch Top 40 number-one singles of 2017 =

This is a list of the Dutch Top 40 number-one singles of 2017. The Dutch Top 40 is a chart that ranks the best-performing singles of the Netherlands. It is published every week by radio station Radio 538.

== Chart history ==
Issue date	Song	Artist(s)	Ref.
January 7	"Rockabye"	Clean Bandit featuring Sean Paul and Anne-Marie	
January 14	"Rockabye"	Clean Bandit featuring Sean Paul and Anne-Marie	
January 21	"Shape of You"	Ed Sheeran	
January 28	"Shape of You"	Ed Sheeran	
February 4	"Shape of You"	Ed Sheeran	
February 11	"Shape of You"	Ed Sheeran	
February 18	"Shape of You"	Ed Sheeran	
February 25	"Shape of You"	Ed Sheeran	
March 4	"Shape of You"	Ed Sheeran	
March 11	"Shape of You"	Ed Sheeran	
March 18	"Shape of You"	Ed Sheeran	
March 25	"Shape of You"	Ed Sheeran	
April 1	"Shape of You"	Ed Sheeran	
April 8	"Shape of You"	Ed Sheeran	
April 15	"Shape of You"	Ed Sheeran	
April 22	"Shape of You"	Ed Sheeran	
April 29	"Shape of You"	Ed Sheeran	
May 6	"Despacito"	Luis Fonsi and Daddy Yankee featuring Justin Bieber	
May 13	"Despacito"	Luis Fonsi and Daddy Yankee featuring Justin Bieber	
May 20	"Despacito"	Luis Fonsi and Daddy Yankee featuring Justin Bieber	
May 27	"Despacito"	Luis Fonsi and Daddy Yankee featuring Justin Bieber	
June 3	"Despacito"	Luis Fonsi and Daddy Yankee featuring Justin Bieber	
June 10	"Despacito"	Luis Fonsi and Daddy Yankee featuring Justin Bieber	
June 17	"Despacito"	Luis Fonsi and Daddy Yankee featuring Justin Bieber	
June 24	"Despacito"	Luis Fonsi and Daddy Yankee featuring Justin Bieber	
July 1	"Despacito"	Luis Fonsi and Daddy Yankee featuring Justin Bieber	
July 8	"Despacito"	Luis Fonsi and Daddy Yankee featuring Justin Bieber	
July 15	"Despacito"	Luis Fonsi and Daddy Yankee featuring Justin Bieber	
July 22	"Despacito"	Luis Fonsi and Daddy Yankee featuring Justin Bieber	
July 29	"Despacito"	Luis Fonsi and Daddy Yankee featuring Justin Bieber	
August 5	"Despacito"	Luis Fonsi and Daddy Yankee featuring Justin Bieber	
August 12	"Despacito"	Luis Fonsi and Daddy Yankee featuring Justin Bieber	
August 19	"Mama"	Jonas Blue featuring William Singe	
August 26	"Mama"	Jonas Blue featuring William Singe	
September 2	"Mi Gente"	J Balvin and Willy William	
September 9	"Mi Gente"	J Balvin and Willy William	
September 16	"New Rules"	Dua Lipa	
September 23	"Mi Gente"	J Balvin and Willy William	
September 30	"Mi Gente"	J Balvin and Willy William	
October 7	"Mi Gente"	J Balvin and Willy William	
October 14	"What About Us"	Pink	
October 21	"What About Us"	Pink	
October 28	"What About Us"	Pink	
November 4	"What About Us"	Pink	
November 11	"What About Us"	Pink	
November 18	"What About Us"	Pink	
November 25	"What About Us"	Pink	
December 2	"Perfect" (including "Perfect Duet")	Ed Sheeran (with Beyoncé)	
December 9	"Perfect" (including "Perfect Duet")	Ed Sheeran (with Beyoncé)	
December 16	"Perfect" (including "Perfect Duet")	Ed Sheeran (with Beyoncé)	
December 23	"Perfect" (including "Perfect Duet")	Ed Sheeran (with Beyoncé)	
December 30	"Perfect" (including "Perfect Duet")	Ed Sheeran (with Beyoncé)	

== Number-one artists ==
Position	Artist	Weeks #1
1	Ed Sheeran	20
2	Luis Fonsi	15
2	Daddy Yankee (as featuring)	15
2	Justin Bieber (as featuring)	15
3	Pink	7
3	Beyoncé (as featuring)	7
4	J Balvin	5
4	Willy William	5
5	Clean Bandit	2
5	Anne-Marie (as featuring)	2
5	Sean Paul (as featuring)	2
5	Jonas Blue	2
5	William Singe (as featuring)	2

== See also ==
- 2017 in music
