= List of Dutch Top 40 number-one singles of 2018 =

This is a list of the Dutch Top 40 number-one singles of 2018. The Dutch Top 40 is a chart that ranks the best-performing singles of the Netherlands. It is published every week by radio station Radio 538.

== Chart history ==
Issue date	Song	Artist(s)	Ref.
January 6	"Perfect" (including "Perfect Duet")	Ed Sheeran (with Beyoncé)	
January 13	"Perfect" (including "Perfect Duet")	Ed Sheeran (with Beyoncé)	
January 20	"Perfect" (including "Perfect Duet")	Ed Sheeran (with Beyoncé)	
January 27	"Perfect" (including "Perfect Duet")	Ed Sheeran (with Beyoncé)	
February 3	"Zoutelande"	BLØF (featuring Geike Arnaert)	
February 10	"Zoutelande"	BLØF (featuring Geike Arnaert)	
February 17	"Zoutelande"	BLØF (featuring Geike Arnaert)	
February 24	"Zoutelande"	BLØF (featuring Geike Arnaert)	
March 3	"Zoutelande"	BLØF (featuring Geike Arnaert)	
March 10	"Zoutelande"	BLØF (featuring Geike Arnaert)	
March 17	"Zoutelande"	BLØF (featuring Geike Arnaert)	
March 24	"Zoutelande"	BLØF (featuring Geike Arnaert)	
March 31	"Zoutelande"	BLØF (featuring Geike Arnaert)	
April 7	"Zoutelande"	BLØF (featuring Geike Arnaert)	
April 14	"Friends"	Marshmello and Anne-Marie	
April 21	"Friends"	Marshmello and Anne-Marie	
April 28	"One Kiss"	Calvin Harris and Dua Lipa	
May 5	"One Kiss"	Calvin Harris and Dua Lipa	
May 12	"One Kiss"	Calvin Harris and Dua Lipa	
May 19	"One Kiss"	Calvin Harris and Dua Lipa	
May 26	"One Kiss"	Calvin Harris and Dua Lipa	
June 2	"One Kiss"	Calvin Harris and Dua Lipa	
June 9	"One Kiss"	Calvin Harris and Dua Lipa	
June 16	"One Kiss"	Calvin Harris and Dua Lipa	
June 23	"One Kiss"	Calvin Harris and Dua Lipa	
June 30	"One Kiss"	Calvin Harris and Dua Lipa	
July 7	"One Kiss"	Calvin Harris and Dua Lipa	
July 14	"One Kiss"	Calvin Harris and Dua Lipa	
July 21	"One Kiss"	Calvin Harris and Dua Lipa	
July 28	"One Kiss"	Calvin Harris and Dua Lipa	
August 4	"One Kiss"	Calvin Harris and Dua Lipa	
August 11	"One Kiss"	Calvin Harris and Dua Lipa	
August 18	"In My Feelings"	Drake	
August 25	"Djadja"	Aya Nakamura	
September 1	"Djadja"	Aya Nakamura	
September 8	"Shotgun"	George Ezra	
September 15	"Shotgun"	George Ezra	
September 22	"Verleden tijd"	Frenna and Lil' Kleine	
September 29	"Verleden tijd"	Frenna and Lil' Kleine	
October 6	"Verleden tijd"	Frenna and Lil' Kleine	
October 13	"Verleden tijd"	Frenna and Lil' Kleine	
October 20	"Verleden tijd"	Frenna and Lil' Kleine	
October 27	"Verleden tijd"	Frenna and Lil' Kleine	
November 3	"Duurt te lang"	Davina Michelle	
November 10	"Duurt te lang"	Davina Michelle	
November 17	"Duurt te lang"	Davina Michelle	
November 24	"Duurt te lang"	Davina Michelle	
December 1	"Duurt te lang"	Davina Michelle	
December 8	"Duurt te lang"	Davina Michelle	
December 15	"Duurt te lang"	Davina Michelle	
December 22	"Duurt te lang"	Davina Michelle	
December 29	"Duurt te lang"	Davina Michelle	

== Number-one artists ==
Position	Artist	Weeks #1
1	Calvin Harris	16
1	Dua Lipa	16
2	BLØF	10
2	Geike Arnaert (as featuring)	10
3	Davina Michelle	9
4	Frenna	6
4	Lil' Kleine	6
5	Ed Sheeran	4
5	Beyoncé (as featuring)	4
6	Marshmello	2
6	Anne-Marie	2
6	Aya Nakamura	2
6	George Ezra	2
7	Drake	1

== See also ==
- 2018 in music
