= Hold Me (Sandhja song) =

Single by Sandhja

from the album Gold
- Released: 15 November 2013
- Recorded: 2015
- Genre: Pop
- Length: 3:41
- Label: Sony Music Entertainment Finland
- Songwriter(s): William Terry Hicks, Sandhja

Sandhja singles chronology
| "Hold Me" (2013) | "Gold" (2014) |

"Hold Me" is a song performed by Finnish singer Sandhja. The song was released as a digital download on 15 November 2013 through Sony Music Entertainment Finland as the lead single from her debut studio album Gold (2014). The song peaked at number 12 on the Finnish Airplay Chart.

== Music video ==
A music video to accompany the release of "Hold Me" was first released onto YouTube on 15 November 2013 at a total length of three minutes and fifty seconds. The video was directed by Ville Nuoraho.

== Track listing ==
Digital download
| No. | Title | Length |
|---|---|---|
| 1. | "Hold Me" | 3:41 |

== Chart performance ==
| Chart (2013/14) | Peak position |
|---|---|
| Finland Airplay (Radiosoittolista) | 12 |

== Release history ==
| Region | Date | Format | Label |
|---|---|---|---|
| Finland | 15 November 2013 | Digital download | Sony Music Entertainment Finland |
