= Wasn't Expecting That =

2011 single by Jamie Lawson

- Original cover artwork

Single by Jamie Lawson

from the album Wasn't Expecting That and Jamie Lawson
- Released: 11 March 2011; 3 April 2015 (re-release)
- Recorded: 2011
- Genre: Pop; folk
- Length: 3:21
- Label: Lookout Mountain; Gingerbread Man (re-release)
- Songwriter: Jamie Lawson

Jamie Lawson singles chronology
"Wasn't Expecting That" (00000005)	"Lucy Rocks" (2011)

Jamie Lawson singles chronology
"Lucy Rocks" (2011)	"Wasn't Expecting That" (2015)	"Ahead of Myself" (2015)

"Wasn't Expecting That"
- 2015 re-release cover

"Wasn't Expecting That" is a song recorded by British singer-songwriter Jamie Lawson. It was originally released on 11 March 2011 as the lead single from his third studio album Wasn't Expecting That (2011) and peaked at number 3 on the Irish Singles Chart. Lawson was the first artist signed by Ed Sheeran to his new record label, Gingerbread Man Recordings in 2015. The song was re-released on 3 April 2015 as the lead single from his fourth studio album Jamie Lawson. The song peaked at number 6 on the UK Singles Chart. On 31 July 2016, Lawson performed the song in an episode of the Australian soap Neighbours.

== Music video ==
Three variations of the music video were made: the original, an international version and an Australian version.

The original version of the song was posted as an acoustic performance to YouTube in January 2011 and now has over 1 million views.

A music video to accompany the new recording for re-release was posted to YouTube on 26 August 2015 at a total length of three minutes and twenty-eight seconds. The video, directed by award-winning filmmaker Bouha Kazmi, has more than 11 million views on YouTube. The video tells the story of a couple who fall in love, but are then left traumatised when the woman is diagnosed with terminal cancer. It follows the couple as they go back in time throughout their relationship. It shows the woman giving birth, the two getting married and their first kiss.

A further version was filmed in Sydney for the Australian market when Lawson toured with Ed Sheeran in Australia in 2015.

== Charts ==
=== Weekly charts ===
2011 weekly chart performance for "Wasn't Expecting That"
Chart	Peak position
Ireland (IRMA)	3

2015–2016 weekly chart performance for "Wasn't Expecting That"
Chart	Peak position
Australia (ARIA)	3
Austria (Ö3 Austria Top 40)	37
Belgium (Ultratip Bubbling Under Flanders)	7
Belgium (Ultratip Bubbling Under Wallonia)	42
Germany (GfK)	42
Hungary (Rádiós Top 40)	17
Ireland (IRMA)	21
Netherlands (Single Top 100)	97
New Zealand (Recorded Music NZ)	7
Portugal (Top 50)	29
Slovenia (SloTop50)	50
UK Singles (Official Charts)	6
US Adult Top 40 (Billboard)	18

=== Year-end charts ===
2015 year-end chart performance for "Wasn't Expecting That"
Chart (2015)	Position
Australia (ARIA)	36

== Certifications ==
Certifications for "Wasn't Expecting That"
Region	Certification	Certified units/sales
Australia (ARIA)	2× Platinum	140,000^{‡}
Austria (IFPI Austria)	Gold	15,000^{‡}
Denmark (IFPI Danmark)	Platinum	90,000^{‡}
Germany (BVMI)	Gold	200,000^{‡}
New Zealand (RMNZ)	2× Platinum	60,000^{‡}
United Kingdom (BPI)	Platinum	600,000^{‡}
^{‡} Sales+streaming figures based on certification alone.

== Release history ==
Release formats for "Wasn't Expecting That"
Region	Date	Format	Label
Ireland	11 March 2011	Digital download	Lookout Mountain
United Kingdom	3 April 2015	Digital download	Gingerbreadman Records
