= Sandhja =

Finnish singer (born 1991)

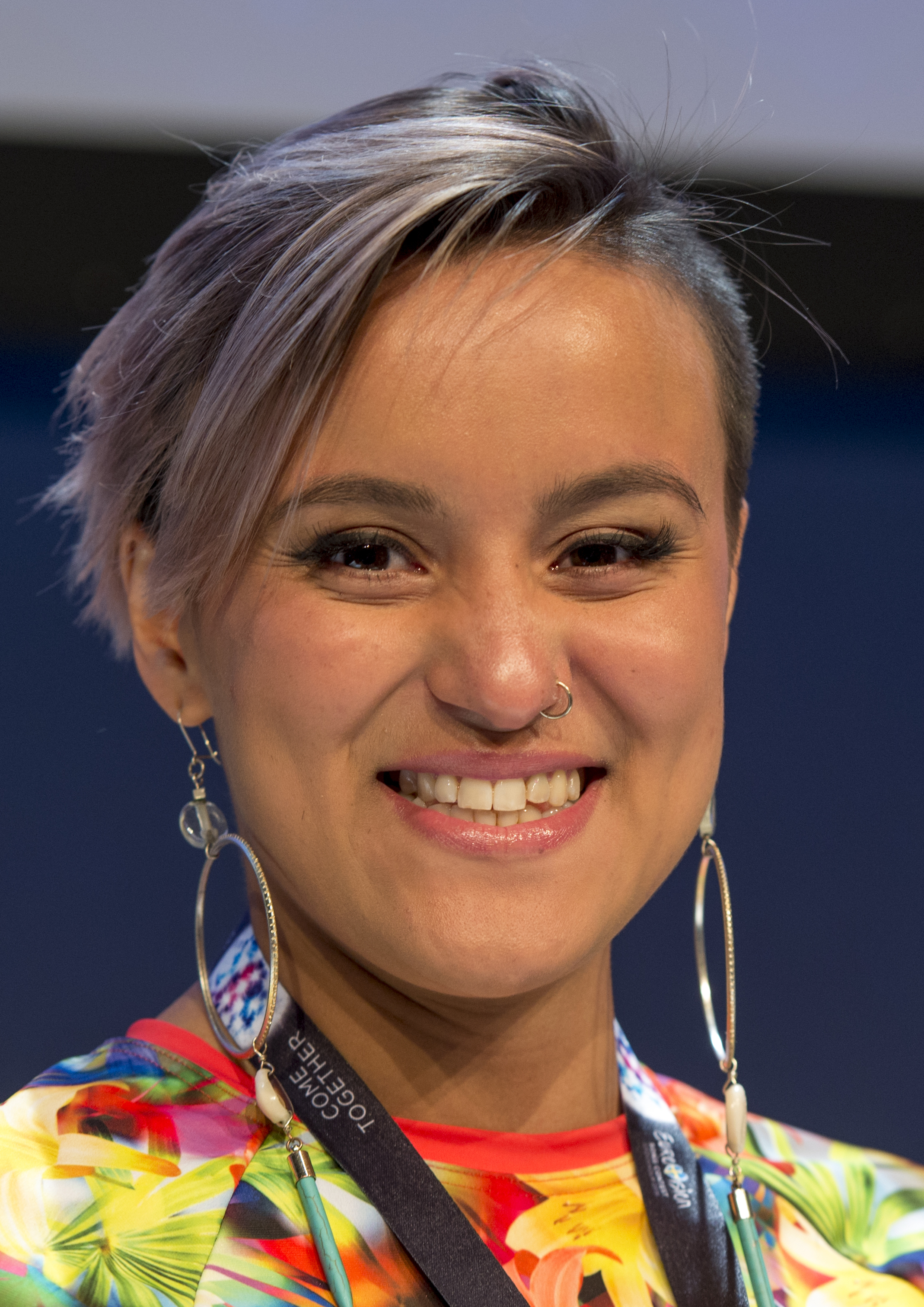
- Sandhja in 2016

Background information
- Born: Sandhja Kuivalainen; 16 March 1991 (age 35); Helsinki, Finland
- Genres: Soul; dance-pop; funk
- Occupation: Singer
- Instrument: Vocals
- Years active: 2013–present
- Website: Official website

Sandhja Kuivalainen (born 16 March 1991), known professionally as simply Sandhja, is a Finnish singer. She represented Finland in the Eurovision Song Contest 2016 with the song "Sing It Away". Sandhja was born to an Indo-Guyanese mother and a Finnish father.

== Career ==
=== 2013–14: Gold ===
Sandhja released her debut single "Hold Me" on 15 November 2013 as the lead single from her debut studio album. On 7 March 2014 she released "Gold" as the second single from her debut studio album. She released her debut studio album Gold on 23 May 2014 through Sony Music Entertainment Finland.

=== 2015–present: Eurovision Song Contest and Freedom Venture ===
In May 2015 she featured on Brandon Bauer's single "The Flavor". On 30 October 2015 she released the single "My Bass". Sandhja was announced as one of the 18 competing artists in Uuden Musiikin Kilpailu 2016 on 12 January 2016. She competed in the third semi-final and advanced to the final. In the final, she was declared the winner after winning the jury vote and placing third with the public. She represented Finland in the Eurovision Song Contest 2016, performing first of all contestants in the first semi-final on 10 May 2016 at the Ericsson Globe in Stockholm, Sweden, but failed to qualify for the May 14 final. Her second studio album Freedom Venture, was released on 29 April 2016.

== Discography ==
=== Albums ===
Title	Details
Gold	Released: 23 May 2014; Label: Sony Music Entertainment Finland; Format: Digital download
Freedom Venture	Released: 29 April 2016; Label: Sony Music Entertainment Finland; Format: Digital download

=== Singles ===
==== As lead artist ====
Title	Year	Peak chart positions		Album
Title	Year	FIN DL	FIN Air	Album
"Hold Me"	2013	—	12	Gold
"Gold"	2014	—	71	Gold
"My Bass"	2015	—	—	Freedom Venture
"Sing It Away"	2016	8	47	Freedom Venture
"Love Me High"	2016	—	—	Freedom Venture
"We Go On" (featuring Gracias & Ekow)	2017	—	—	Non-album single
"—" denotes a single that did not chart or was not released.

==== As featured artist ====
Title	Year	Album
"The Flavor" (Brandon Bauer featuring Sandhja)	2015	Versetile

Awards and achievements
Preceded by Pertti Kurikan Nimipäivät with "Aina mun pitää"	Finland in the Eurovision Song Contest; 2016	Succeeded by Norma John with "Blackbird"
