= Jamie Lawson (musician) =

British singer-songwriter (born 1975)

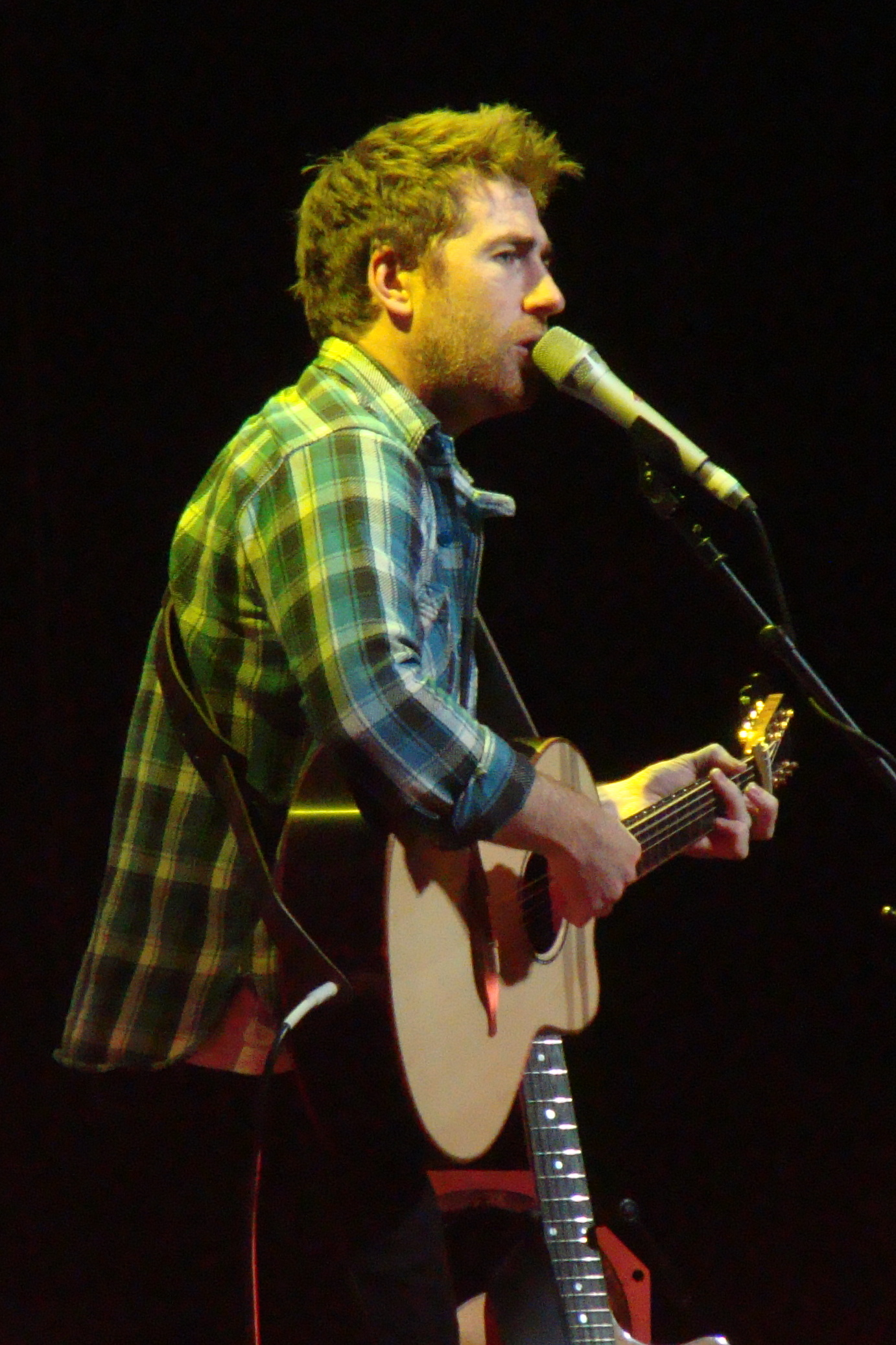
- Lawson performing in 2015

Background information
- Born: 1 December 1975 (age 50)
- Origin: St Budeaux, Plymouth, England
- Genre: Acoustic
- Occupations: Singer-songwriter; musician
- Instruments: Guitar; vocals
- Years active: 2000–present
- Labels: Lookout Mountain; Allotment Recordings; Gingerbread Man
- Website: jamielawsonmusic.com

Jamie Lawson (born 1 December 1975) is an English singer-songwriter and musician. He was born and raised in St Budeaux, Plymouth, England. He was the first artist to be signed by Ed Sheeran's new record label, Gingerbread Man Records. Lawson is best known for his hit single, "Wasn't Expecting That", and his self-titled album which peaked at number one on the UK Albums Chart in 2015.

Lawson released two studio albums, Last Night Stars and The Pull of the Moon, before the release of his single, "Wasn't Expecting That", in Ireland in 2011; however his success did not go beyond Ireland. Lawson's popularity abroad began in 2015, when he was signed to Gingerbread Man Records and re-released his single, "Wasn't Expecting That".

Jamie Lawson was born in St Budeaux, an area in the north west of Plymouth. He attended Barne Barton Primary School and later studied at Tamarside Community College. After school Jamie studied at Plymouth College of Art & Design and completed a ND Foundation Course in Art and Design.

Lawson first picked up a guitar at the age of eight as a Christmas present. He wrote his first song at fifteen. His music career began in a cover band when he was in high school. From the age of seventeen, Lawson began performing in pubs and bars around UK and Ireland.

== Career ==
=== 1995–2001 ===
Lawson released his first demos to the mp3.com platform. His song, "Fussy", got international playtime when it was included into the playlist on the college radio station, KLSU, in Baton Rouge, Louisiana. The first spin of this song was in January 2001 on The Little Lighthouse radio show at KLSU. Lawson played frequent shows at the 12 Bar Club in London. Lawson also played in the alternative rock band, Haiku, with Russell Cleave. Cleave went on to play drums on songs recorded for Lawson's debut album.

=== 2006–2010: Last Night Stars and The Pull of the Moon ===
In 2006, he released his debut studio album, Last Night Stars, through Allotment Recordings, the indie record label Lawson set up with Simon Allen and Tom Clues. On 20 June 2010, he released his second studio album, The Pull of the Moon, through Lookout Mountain. The album peaked to number 70 on the Irish Albums Chart. In 2015 the album peaked to number 9 in New Zealand.

=== 2011: Wasn't Expecting That ===
The single "Wasn't Expecting That" was first released on YouTube on 3 January 2011. The single soon became hugely popular after it was played on one of Ireland's biggest radio stations, Today FM's Breakfast Show. On 11 March 2011, he released the single in Ireland, through Universal Music Ireland as the lead single from his third studio album. The song peaked at number 3 on the Irish Singles Chart. On 1 April 2011, he released his third studio album Wasn't Expecting That in Ireland, through Lookout Mountain. The album peaked at number 11 on the Irish Albums Chart. On 30 September 2011, he released the single, "Lucy Rocks", as the second single from the album.

=== 2015–2016: Jamie Lawson ===
In March 2015, Ed Sheeran revealed Lawson will be the first artist to be signed to his new label, Gingerbread Man Records. On 3 April 2015, Lawson re-released the single "Wasn't Expecting That". The single has peaked to number 3 in Australia and number 7 in New Zealand. On 21 May, it was confirmed that Lawson is the first artist to be signed by Sheeran's newly formed label. The single hit the number 6 chart position in the UK on 8 October 2015 and was certified silver on 20 November 2015 by the British Phonographic Industry. Later in 2016 Jamie Lawson won the prestigious Ivor Novello award for 'Best Song Musically and Lyrically', beating his mentor and friend Ed Sheeran to the highly prized Ivor Novello award.

Lawson's self-titled album, Jamie Lawson, was released worldwide on 16 October 2015, under Gingerbread Man Records. The album features "Wasn't Expecting That" as the lead single, along with "Ahead of Myself" and "Cold in Ohio" as the second and third single of the album. The album was certified gold by the British Phonographic Industry, denoting shipments of 100,000 copies.

Lawson supported Sheeran on the leg of his X Tour in March and April 2015. He also supported One Direction on their 2015 On the Road Again Tour in the UK and Ireland. Lawson made his first US television appearance on The Ellen DeGeneres Show on 10 November 2015.

In August 2016, Lawson made a guest appearance in the Australian soap Neighbours, singing Wasn't Expecting That.

In November 2016 Lawson revealed through his social media accounts that he had spent 12 days at the Sunset Sounds recording studio in California recording 15 songs for his next album. He also later revealed during a Facebook Q&A that the album was intended for release before the UK Summer (March 2017).

=== 2017: Happy Accidents ===
In August 2017, Lawson released a video of him talking with Ed Sheeran, announcing his single "Can't See Straight" from his album Happy Accidents, released on 29 September of that year.

== Discography ==
=== Albums ===
Title	Details	Peak chart positions					Certifications
Title	Details	UK	AUS	IRE	NZ	US	Certifications
Last Night Stars	Released: 22 May 2003; Label: Allotment Recordings (ALLOT005); Format: CD · digital download	—	—	—	—	—	
The Pull of the Moon	Released: 20 June 2010 (LOOKCD004); Label: Lookout Mountain; Format: CD · LP · digital download	—	—	70	9	—	
Wasn't Expecting That (re-release of The Pull of the Moon)	Released: 1 April 2011; Label: Universal Music Ireland, Lookout Mountain (2768690); Format: CD · digital download	—	—	11	—	—	
Jamie Lawson	Released: 16 October 2015; Label: Gingerbread Man, Warner Music; Format: CD · LP · digital download	1	4	5	3	87	BPI: Gold
Happy Accidents	Released: 29 September 2017; Label: Gingerbread Man, Warner Music; Format: CD · LP · digital download	23	—	—	— (Note: Happy Accidents did not enter the NZ Top 40 Albums Chart, but peaked at number four on the NZ Heatseekers Albums Chart.)	—	
The Years in Between	Released: 29 March 2019; Label: Gingerbread Man; Format: CD · LP · digital download · streaming	—	—	—	—	—	
Little Weakness	Released: 20 October 2023; Label: Not Too Bad; Format: Digital download · streaming	—	—	—	—	—	
"—" denotes an album that did not chart or was not released in that territory.

=== Extended plays ===
Title	Details
The Small Wish	Released: 2002; Label: Allotment Recordings; Format: CD
The Kitchen Songs	Released: 2002; Label: Allotment Recordings; Format: CD
Real Thing	Released: 2008; Label: Allotment Recordings; Format: CD
Between Each Breath	Released: 2013; Label: Operator; Format: CD
Moving Images	Released: May 2020; Label: Lookout Mountain; Format: digital
Taking Pictures	Released: November 2020; Label: Lookout Mountain; Format: digital

=== Singles ===
Title	Year	Peak chart positions				Certifications	Album
Title	Year	UK	AUS	IRE	NZ	Certifications	Album
"Heal a Bone"	2003	—	—	—	—		Late Night Stars
"It's Over"	2003	—	—	—	—		Late Night Stars
"The Last Time"	2010	—	—	—	—		Pull of the Moon
"But Love Me" / "Oh, What a Foolish Me"	2010	—	—	—	—		Pull of the Moon
"Wasn't Expecting That"	2011	—	—	3	—		Wasn't Expecting That
"Lucy Rocks"	2011	—	—	—	—		Wasn't Expecting That
"Wasn't Expecting That"	2015	6	3	21	7	ARIA: 2× Platinum; BPI: Platinum; RMNZ: 2× Platinum	Jamie Lawson
"Ahead of Myself"	2015	—	59	—	—		Jamie Lawson
"Cold in Ohio"	2015	—	—	—	—		Jamie Lawson
"Don't Let Me Let You Go"	2016	—	—	—	—		Jamie Lawson
"Someone for Everyone"	2016	—	—	—	—		Jamie Lawson
"Can't See Straight"	2017	—	—	—	—		Happy Accidents
"A Little Mercy"	2017	—	—	—	—		Happy Accidents
"Footprints in the Snow"	2017	—	—	—	—		—N/a
"Testify"	2018	—	—	—	—		—N/a
"The Answer"	2019	—	—	—	—		The Years in Between
"Where Have All the Vibrations Gone?" (with Turin Brakes)	2019	—	—	—	—		—N/a
"Use Somebody"	2019	—	—	—	—		—N/a
"She Sings for Me"	2020	—	—	—	—		Moving Images
"Closure"	2020	—	—	—	—		Moving Images
"And You Saved Me"	2020	—	—	—	—		Moving Images
"All Because of You"	2020	—	—	—	—		Taking Pictures
"Out of This World" (with Robert Vincent)	2020	—	—	—	—		Taking Pictures
"A Case of You"	2021	—	—	—	—		
"Freedom"	2021	—	—	—	—		
"The Scientist"	2022	—	—	—	—		
"Love is a Losing Game"	2022	—	—	—	—		
"The List"	2022	—	—	—	—		
"Napoleon Dynamite"	2023	—	—	—	—		Little Weakness
"When it Comes to Love"	2023	—	—	—	—		Little Weakness
"Matter to Me"	2023	—	—	—	—		Little Weakness
"Wasn't Expecting That" (with Kate Rusby)	2025	—	—	—	—		
"—" denotes a single that did not chart or was not released in that territory.

== Tours ==
=== Opening act ===
As follows:

- X Tour (Ed Sheeran) (2014–2015)
- On the Road Again Tour (One Direction) (2015)
- The Fire and the Flood Tour (Vance Joy) (2016)
- ÷ Tour (Ed Sheeran) (2017–2019)
