= List of number-one singles of 2024 (Finland) =

This is the complete list of number-one singles in Finland in 2024 according to the Official Finnish Charts. The list on the left side of the box (Suomen virallinen singlelista, "the Official Finnish Singles Chart") represents physical and digital track sales as well as music streaming, and the one on the right side (Suomen virallinen radiosoittolista, "the Official Finnish Airplay Chart") represents airplay.

== Chart history ==
List of number-one singles of 2024 in Finland
Official Finnish Singles Chart				Official Finnish Airplay Chart			
Issue date	Song	Artist(s)	Reference(s)	Issue date	Song	Artist(s)	Reference(s)
Week 1	"Väärään aikaan"	Ahti (featuring Hugo)		Week 1	"Pimee"	Elastinen (featuring Bess)	
Week 2	"Timanttei"	Mirella		Week 2	"Pimee"	Elastinen (featuring Bess)	
Week 3	"Timanttei"	Mirella		Week 3	"Pimee"	Elastinen (featuring Bess)	
Week 4	"Timanttei"	Mirella		Week 4	"Pimee"	Elastinen (featuring Bess)	
Week 5	"Timanttei"	Mirella		Week 5	"Lanka"	Jenni Vartiainen	
Week 6	"Tunnista tuntiin"	Ege Zulu and Behm		Week 6	"Viimeisiä sanoja"	Bee	
Week 7	"Ruoska"	Käärijä and Erika Vikman		Week 7	"Pimee"	Elastinen (featuring Bess)	
Week 8	"Ruoska"	Käärijä and Erika Vikman		Week 8	"Viimeisiä sanoja"	Bee	
Week 9	"Mon chéri"	Pilvi Hämäläinen		Week 9	"Pimee"	Elastinen (featuring Bess)	
Week 10	"Timanttei"	Mirella		Week 10	"Lanka"	Jenni Vartiainen	
Week 11	"Timanttei"	Mirella		Week 11	"Lanka"	Jenni Vartiainen	
Week 12	"Uuteen eiliseen"	Mirella		Week 12	"Lanka"	Jenni Vartiainen	
Week 13	"Uuteen eiliseen"	Mirella		Week 13	"Timanttei"	Mirella	
Week 14	"Timanttei"	Mirella		Week 14	"Paskana"	Sara Siipola	
Week 15	"Timanttei"	Mirella		Week 15	"Syntymäpäivä!"	Behm	
Week 16	"Uus Bitch"	Olga		Week 16	"Syntymäpäivä!"	Behm	
Week 17	"Timanttei"	Mirella		Week 17	"Syntymäpäivä!"	Behm	
Week 18	"Rallikansa"	JVG		Week 18	"Syntymäpäivä!"	Behm	
Week 19	"Rallikansa"	JVG		Week 19	"Timanttei"	Mirella	
Week 20	"Rallikansa"	JVG		Week 20	"Syntymäpäivä!"	Behm	
Week 21	"Juostaan"	Sara Siipola (featuring Sexmane)		Week 21	"Timanttei"	Mirella	
Week 22	"Juostaan"	Sara Siipola (featuring Sexmane)		Week 22	"Timanttei"	Mirella	
Week 23	"Luotathan"	Mirella and Lauri Haav		Week 23	"Paremmin ku kukaan muu"	Benjamin and Bess	
Week 24	"Luotathan"	Mirella and Lauri Haav		Week 24	"Paremmin ku kukaan muu"	Benjamin and Bess	
Week 25	"Luotathan"	Mirella and Lauri Haav		Week 25	"Paremmin ku kukaan muu"	Benjamin and Bess	
Week 26	"Luotathan"	Mirella and Lauri Haav		Week 26	"Jos puhutaan totta"	Ani	
Week 27	"Luotathan"	Mirella and Lauri Haav		Week 27	"Paremmin ku kukaan muu"	Benjamin and Bess	
Week 28	"Luotathan"	Mirella and Lauri Haav		Week 28	"Jos puhutaan totta"	Ani	
Week 29	"Luotathan"	Mirella and Lauri Haav		Week 29	"Paremmin ku kukaan muu"	Benjamin and Bess	
Week 30	"Luotathan"	Mirella and Lauri Haav		Week 30	"Paremmin ku kukaan muu"	Benjamin and Bess	
Week 31	"Luotathan"	Mirella and Lauri Haav		Week 31	"Paremmin ku kukaan muu"	Benjamin and Bess	
Week 32	"Luotathan"	Mirella and Lauri Haav		Week 32	"Paremmin ku kukaan muu"	Benjamin and Bess	
Week 33	"Luotathan"	Mirella and Lauri Haav		Week 33	"Paremmin ku kukaan muu"	Benjamin and Bess	
Week 34	"Vitun hyvin"	Turisti and Averagekidluke		Week 34	"Jos puhutaan totta"	Ani	
Week 35	"Vitun hyvin"	Turisti and Averagekidluke		Week 35	"Paremmin ku kukaan muu"	Benjamin and Bess	
Week 36	"Löytää mut"	Mirella		Week 36	"Häitä pidelly"	Robin Packalen and Tupe	
Week 37	"Löytää mut"	Mirella		Week 37	"Häitä pidelly"	Robin Packalen and Tupe	
Week 38	"Löytää mut"	Mirella		Week 38	"Häitä pidelly"	Robin Packalen and Tupe	
Week 39	"Taikuri"	Turisti		Week 39	"Häitä pidelly"	Robin Packalen and Tupe	
Week 40	"Taikuri"	Turisti		Week 40	"Häitä pidelly"	Robin Packalen and Tupe	
Week 41	"Taikuri"	Turisti		Week 41	"Häitä pidelly"	Robin Packalen and Tupe	
Week 42	"Taikuri"	Turisti		Week 42	"Häitä pidelly"	Robin Packalen and Tupe	
Week 43	"Taikuri"	Turisti		Week 43	"Häitä pidelly"	Robin Packalen and Tupe	
Week 44	"Taikuri"	Turisti		Week 44	"Häitä pidelly"	Robin Packalen and Tupe	
Week 45	"Marraskuu"	Ibe		Week 45	"Luotathan"	Mirella and Lauri Haav	
Week 46	"Marraskuu"	Ibe		Week 46	"Luotathan"	Mirella and Lauri Haav	
Week 47	"Diva"	Averagekidluke		Week 47	"Sirkus"	Shrty	
Week 48	"Diva"	Averagekidluke		Week 48	"Sirkus"	Shrty	
Week 49	"Diva"	Averagekidluke		Week 49	"Sirkus"	Shrty	
Week 50	"Diva"	Averagekidluke		Week 50	"Sirkus"	Shrty	
Week 51	"Diva"	Averagekidluke		Week 51	"Sirkus"	Shrty	
Week 52	"Last Christmas"	Wham!		Week 52	"Die with a Smile"	Lady Gaga and Bruno Mars	

== See also ==
- List of number-one albums of 2024 (Finland)
