= List of number-one albums of 2025 (Finland) =

This is the complete list of number-one albums in Finland in 2025 according to the Official Finnish Charts compiled by Musiikkituottajat. The chart is based on sales of physical and digital albums as well as music streaming.

== Chart history ==
Number-one albums of 2025 in Finland
Week	Album	Artist(s)	Ref.
Week 1	Kunpa oisin kertonut	Mirella	
Week 2	Kunpa oisin kertonut	Mirella	
Week 3	Kunpa oisin kertonut	Mirella	
Week 4	Kunpa oisin kertonut	Mirella	
Week 5	Apathia	Ares	
Week 6	Apathia	Ares	
Week 7	Apathia	Ares	
Week 8	Apathia	Ares	
Week 9	Apathia	Ares	
Week 10	Apathia	Ares	
Week 11	Mayhem	Lady Gaga	
Week 12	Apathia	Ares	
Week 13	Origo	Jenni Vartiainen	
Week 14	Vanhasta uuteen	Isac Elliot	
Week 15	Klondike	Costi	
Week 16	Klondike	Costi	
Week 17	Apathia	Ares	
Week 18	Skeletá	Ghost	
Week 19	Apathia	Ares	
Week 20	Sauna Collection	KAJ	
Week 21	Apathia	Ares	
Week 22	Apathia	Ares	
Week 23	Apathia	Ares	
Week 24	Baddie Issues	Sara Bee	
Week 25	Denim	Averagekidluke	
Week 26	Denim	Averagekidluke	
Week 27	Denim	Averagekidluke	
Week 28	Denim	Averagekidluke	
Week 29	Denim	Averagekidluke	
Week 30	Denim	Averagekidluke	
Week 31	Denim	Averagekidluke	
Week 32	Denim	Averagekidluke	
Week 33	Denim	Averagekidluke	
Week 34	Elämän tie 1963–2025	Katri Helena	
Week 35	Denim	Averagekidluke	
Week 36	Denim	Averagekidluke	
Week 37	Denim	Averagekidluke	
Week 38	Denim	Averagekidluke	
Week 39	Jos mä oisin rehellinen	Emma & Matilda	
Week 40	Borderland	Amorphis	
Week 41	The Life of a Showgirl	Taylor Swift	
Week 42	The Life of a Showgirl	Taylor Swift	
Week 43	Magic City	Turisti	
Week 44	Magic City	Turisti	
Week 45	Magic City	Turisti	
Week 46	Magic City	Turisti	
Week 47	Magic City	Turisti	
Week 48	Magic City	Turisti	
Week 49	Magic City	Turisti	
Week 50	Unitas Sigma	Cheek and various artists	
Week 51	Unitas Sigma	Cheek and various artists	
Week 52	Unitas Sigma	Cheek and various artists	

== See also ==
- List of number-one singles of 2025 (Finland)
