= List of number-one singles of 2025 (Finland) =

This is the complete list of number-one singles in Finland in 2025 according to the Official Finnish Charts. The list on the left side of the box (Suomen virallinen singlelista, "the Official Finnish Singles Chart") represents physical and digital track sales as well as music streaming, and the one on the right side (Suomen virallinen radiosoittolista, "the Official Finnish Airplay Chart") represents airplay.

== Chart history ==
List of number-one singles of 2025 in Finland
| Official Finnish Singles Chart | | | | Official Finnish Airplay Chart | | | |
| Issue date | Song | Artist(s) | Ref. | Issue date | Song | Artist(s) | Ref. |
|---|---|---|---|---|---|---|---|
| Week 1 | "Diva" | Averagekidluke | | Week 1 | "Löytää mut" | Mirella | |
| Week 2 | "Menestys on paras tapa kostaa" | Ares | | Week 2 | "Löytää mut" | Mirella | |
| Week 3 | "Menestys on paras tapa kostaa" | Ares | | Week 3 | "Löytää mut" | Mirella | |
| Week 4 | "Menestys on paras tapa kostaa" | Ares | | Week 4 | "Sirkus" | Shrty | |
| Week 5 | "Menestys on paras tapa kostaa" | Ares | | Week 5 | "Sirkus" | Shrty | |
| Week 6 | "Menestys on paras tapa kostaa" | Ares | | Week 6 | "Löytää mut" | Mirella | |
| Week 7 | "Rehellisesti" | JVG | | Week 7 | "Löytää mut" | Mirella | |
| Week 8 | "Diana" | Turisti | | Week 8 | "Löytää mut" | Mirella | |
| Week 9 | "Diana" | Turisti | | Week 9 | "Löytää mut" | Mirella | |
| Week 10 | "Bara bada bastu" | KAJ | | Week 10 | "Hitaammin hautaan" | Nelli Matula | |
| Week 11 | "Bara bada bastu" | KAJ | | Week 11 | "Hitaammin hautaan" | Nelli Matula | |
| Week 12 | "Bara bada bastu" | KAJ | | Week 12 | "Hitaammin hautaan" | Nelli Matula | |
| Week 13 | "Bara bada bastu" | KAJ | | Week 13 | "Hitaammin hautaan" | Nelli Matula | |
| Week 14 | "Bara bada bastu" | KAJ | | Week 14 | "Hitaammin hautaan" | Nelli Matula | |
| Week 15 | "Bara bada bastu" | KAJ | | Week 15 | "Hitaammin hautaan" | Nelli Matula | |
| Week 16 | "Toisessa elämässä" | Lauri Haav | | Week 16 | "Hitaammin hautaan" | Nelli Matula | |
| Week 17 | "Toisessa elämässä" | Lauri Haav | | Week 17 | "Hitaammin hautaan" | Nelli Matula | |
| Week 18 | "Onneks" | Ares | | Week 18 | "Hitaammin hautaan" | Nelli Matula | |
| Week 19 | "Onneks" | Ares | | Week 19 | "Hitaammin hautaan" | Nelli Matula | |
| Week 20 | "Onneks" | Ares | | Week 20 | "Hitaammin hautaan" | Nelli Matula | |
| Week 21 | "Bara bada bastu" | KAJ | | Week 21 | "Hitaammin hautaan" | Nelli Matula | |
| Week 22 | "Aja tai kuole" | Lauri Haav and Mirella | | Week 22 | "Hitaammin hautaan" | Nelli Matula | |
| Week 23 | "Äiti Teresa" | Abreu (featuring Bizi) | | Week 23 | "Hitaammin hautaan" | Nelli Matula | |
| Week 24 | "Kävi miten kävi" | JVG (featuring Emma & Matilda) | | Week 24 | "Azizam" | Ed Sheeran | |
| Week 25 | "Meininki" | Averagekidluke, Turisti, Ares, Jore & Zpoppa and Willem | | Week 25 | "Azizam" | Ed Sheeran | |
| Week 26 | "Meininki" | Averagekidluke, Turisti, Ares, Jore & Zpoppa and Willem | | Week 26 | "Kaiken arvoinen" | Behm | |
| Week 27 | "Kävi miten kävi" | JVG (featuring Emma & Matilda) | | Week 27 | "Kaiken arvoinen" | Behm | |
| Week 28 | "Oma vika" | Isac Elliot | | Week 28 | "Kaiken arvoinen" | Behm | |
| Week 29 | "Oma vika" | Isac Elliot | | Week 29 | "Kaiken arvoinen" | Behm | |
| Week 30 | "Naadindoo" | JVG (featuring Ege Zulu) | | Week 30 | "Kaiken arvoinen" | Behm | |
| Week 31 | "Naadindoo" | JVG (featuring Ege Zulu) | | Week 31 | "Kaiken arvoinen" | Behm | |
| Week 32 | "Naadindoo" | JVG (featuring Ege Zulu) | | Week 32 | "Kaiken arvoinen" | Behm | |
| Week 33 | "Sata enkelii" | Isac Elliot | | Week 33 | "Kaiken arvoinen" | Behm | |
| Week 34 | "Mun type" | Lage | | Week 34 | "Kaiken arvoinen" | Behm | |
| Week 35 | "Tähdet" | Ahti and Behm | | Week 35 | "Kaiken arvoinen" | Behm | |
| Week 36 | "Tähdet" | Ahti and Behm | | Week 36 | "Kaiken arvoinen" | Behm | |
| Week 37 | "Tähdet" | Ahti and Behm | | Week 37 | "Kaiken arvoinen" | Behm | |
| Week 38 | "Ai että" | Isac Elliot | | Week 38 | "Kaiken arvoinen" | Behm | |
| Week 39 | "Rakkauden haudalla" | Lauri Haav and Emma & Matilda | | Week 39 | "Kaiken arvoinen" | Behm | |
| Week 40 | "Rakkauden haudalla" | Lauri Haav and Emma & Matilda | | Week 40 | "Kaiken arvoinen" | Behm | |
| Week 41 | "Lääke" | Lauri Haav | | Week 41 | "Kaiken arvoinen" | Behm | |
| Week 42 | "Lääke" | Lauri Haav | | Week 42 | "Kaiken arvoinen" | Behm | |
| Week 43 | "Kui paljon" | Turisti | | Week 43 | "Kaiken arvoinen" | Behm | |
| Week 44 | "Kui paljon" | Turisti | | Week 44 | "10 000 tuntii" | Kaukua | |
| Week 45 | "Kui paljon" | Turisti | | Week 45 | "Voiko enkelitkin eksyä" | Haloo Helsinki! | |
| Week 46 | "Kui paljon" | Turisti | | Week 46 | "Voiko enkelitkin eksyä" | Haloo Helsinki! | |
| Week 47 | "Kui paljon" | Turisti | | Week 47 | "Voiko enkelitkin eksyä" | Haloo Helsinki! | |
| Week 48 | "Make Up Your Mind" | Mirella and Averagekidluke | | Week 48 | "Tähdet" | Ahti and Behm | |
| Week 49 | "Make Up Your Mind" | Mirella and Averagekidluke | | Week 49 | "Voiko enkelitkin eksyä" | Haloo Helsinki! | |
| Week 50 | "Avaimet mun kieslin – Unitas Sigma" | Cheek, VJ and Sara Bee | | Week 50 | "Tähdet" | Ahti and Behm | |
| Week 51 | "Alcoholic" | Averagekidluke | | Week 51 | "Voiko enkelitkin eksyä" | Haloo Helsinki! | |
| Week 52 | "Last Christmas" | Wham! | | Week 52 | "Voiko enkelitkin eksyä" | Haloo Helsinki! | |

== See also ==
- List of number-one albums of 2025 (Finland)
