= List of number-one albums of 2024 (Finland) =

This is the complete list of number-one albums in Finland in 2024 according to the Official Finnish Charts compiled by Musiikkituottajat. The chart is based on sales of physical and digital albums as well as music streaming.

== Chart history ==
Number-one albums of 2024 in Finland
Week	Album	Artist(s)	Reference(s)
Week 1	Räppäri	Ibe	
Week 2	Soittorasia	Pehmoaino	
Week 3	Soittorasia	Pehmoaino	
Week 4	Soittorasia	Pehmoaino	
Week 5	Soittorasia	Pehmoaino	
Week 6	Soittorasia	Pehmoaino	
Week 7	Vultures 1	Kanye West and Ty Dolla Sign	
Week 8	Hyvikset ja pahikset	Kuumaa	
Week 9	Hyvikset ja pahikset	Kuumaa	
Week 10	Exit Emotions	Blind Channel	
Week 11	Invincible Shield	Judas Priest	
Week 12	III – Tri-Logy	Kingston Wall	
Week 13	Seuraavassa elämässä	Suvi Teräsniska	
Week 14	Hyvikset ja pahikset	Kuumaa	
Week 15	Soittorasia	Pehmoaino	
Week 16	Hyvikset ja pahikset	Kuumaa	
Week 17	Pisara meressä	Kuumaa	
Week 18	Pisara meressä	Kuumaa	
Week 19	Pisara meressä	Kuumaa	
Week 20	Pisara meressä	Kuumaa	
Week 21	Hit Me Hard and Soft	Billie Eilish	
Week 22	Hit Me Hard and Soft	Billie Eilish	
Week 23	Hit Me Hard and Soft	Billie Eilish	
Week 24	Pisara meressä	Kuumaa	
Week 25	Hit Me Hard and Soft	Billie Eilish	
Week 26	Pisara meressä	Kuumaa	
Week 27	Pisara meressä	Kuumaa	
Week 28	Pisara meressä	Kuumaa	
Week 29	The Death of Slim Shady (Coup de Grâce)	Eminem	
Week 30	Pisara meressä	Kuumaa	
Week 31	Pisara meressä	Kuumaa	
Week 32	Pisara meressä	Kuumaa	
Week 33	Hit Me Hard and Soft	Billie Eilish	
Week 34	Pelkkää patee	Pate Mustajärvi	
Week 35	Short n' Sweet	Sabrina Carpenter	
Week 36	Time II	Wintersun	
Week 37	Yuno	Averagekidluke	
Week 38	Yuno	Averagekidluke	
Week 39	Yesterwynde	Nightwish	
Week 40	Yesterwynde	Nightwish	
Week 41	Yesterwynde	Nightwish	
Week 42	Roadman	Turisti	
Week 43	Roadman	Turisti	
Week 44	Roadman	Turisti	
Week 45	Kunpa oisin kertonut	Mirella	
Week 46	Kunpa oisin kertonut	Mirella	
Week 47	Kunpa oisin kertonut	Mirella	
Week 48	Kunpa oisin kertonut	Mirella	
Week 49	Kunpa oisin kertonut	Mirella	
Week 50	Kunpa oisin kertonut	Mirella	
Week 51	Kunpa oisin kertonut	Mirella	
Week 52	Tulkoon joulu	Suvi Teräsniska	

== See also ==
- List of number-one singles of 2024 (Finland)
