= Teemu Keisteri =

Finnish visual artist and DJ (born 1985)

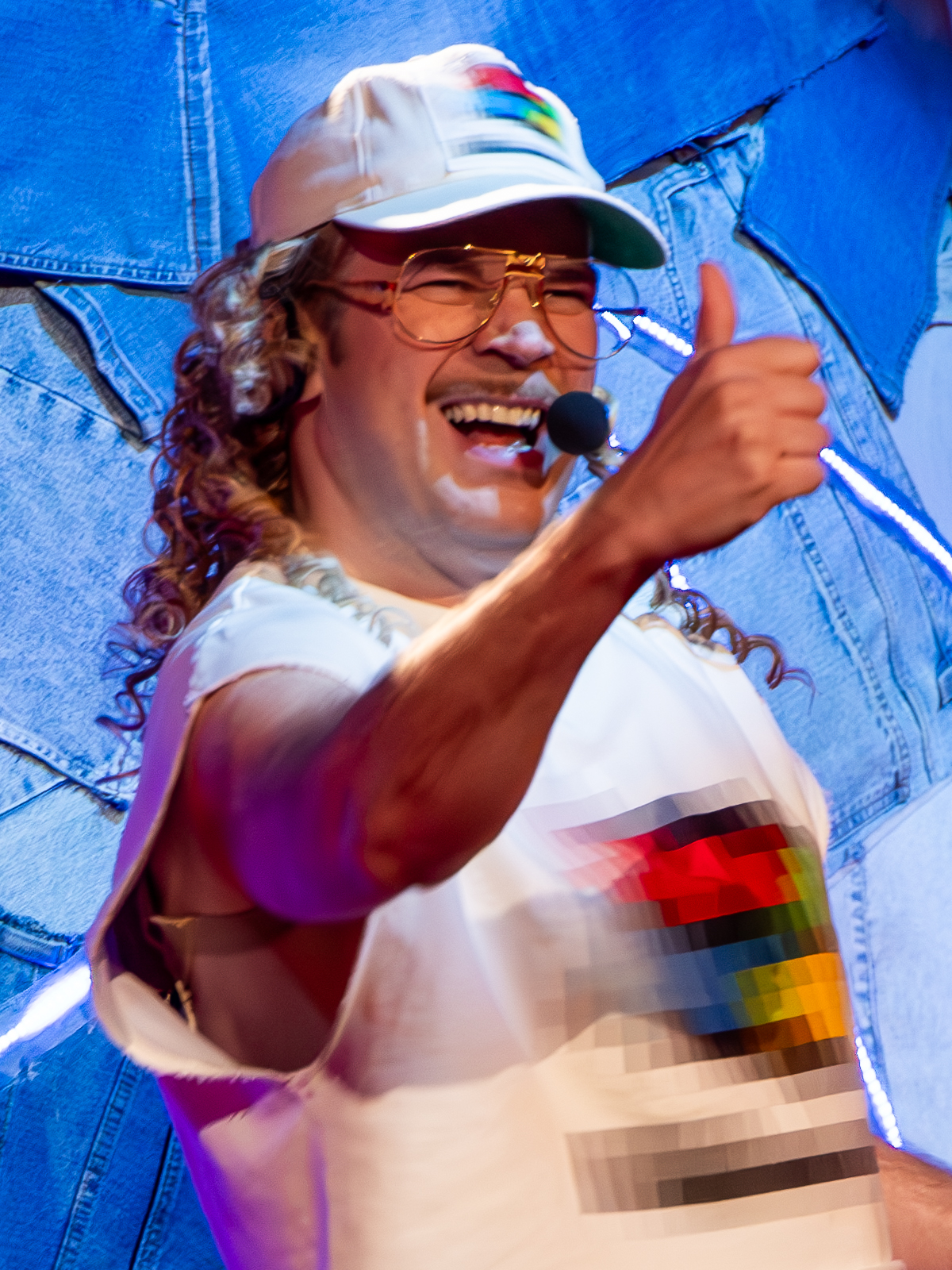
- Keisteri performing as Windows95man at the Eurovision Song Contest 2024
- Born: 22 August 1985 (age 41); Espoo, Finland
- Other names: Windows95man; Ukkeli
- Occupations: Visual artist; disc jockey
- Website: www.teemukeisteri.net

Teemu Keisteri (Finnish pronunciation: [ˈteːmu ˈkei̯steri]; born 22 August 1985) is a Finnish visual artist and DJ who is known for his stage persona Windows95man. As a visual artist, he gained recognition in Finland for his paintings and prints of the fictional character Ukkeli (lit. 'Old man'), whom he created in 2008. As a DJ, his artistic style and appearance draw inspiration from the mid-1990s, during which the Windows 95 operating system was released. His sets tend to consist of gabber and happy hardcore. He represented Finland in the Eurovision Song Contest 2024 with the song "No Rules!", alongside singer Henri Piispanen.

== Early life ==
Keisteri has studied photography at the Institute of Design in Lahti. He has said that he learned during his studies that he is more of a visual artist than a photographer. He is also known as a video artist, dance performer and DJ. Keisteri has his own art gallery called Kalleria (wordplay on the word for gallery "galleria") in Kallio, Helsinki.

== Career ==
=== Early career ===
He appeared in a music video by the rock band Pariisin Kevät, directed as an old-school video.

=== Spread ===
Keisteri originally mastered Windows95man during the Flow Festival 2013, which caught the attention of many journalists and bloggers. He also caught the attention of electronic artist Evian Christ, from which who posted a picture of Keisteri over social media, making the character viral. Since then, his home videos circulated worldwide, he was also invited to multiple music festivals, even working as a DJ in Finnair flight. Several months later, he performed at Helsinki's new year festival for 2022, hosted at the Helsinki City Hall. Other than his character, Keisteri possesses another character named Ukkeli, based on masculinity and Greek statues. Ukkeli has since become popular and had appeared on some t-shirts.

=== Musical projects ===
Another project Keisteri is part of is Peu, which is a 1980s dance band which specialized in making dark pop music.

=== Eurovision ===
Keisteri participated as Windows95man with Henri Piispanen (vocals) in the 2024 edition of Uuden Musiikin Kilpailu, with the song "No Rules!". Despite finishing last in the jury voting, he came first overall with 313 points thanks to the televote in Finland. He was thus selected to represent his country in the Eurovision Song Contest 2024. In the Grand Final on 11 May 2024, the song received 7 points from the national juries, and a further 31 points from the general public, giving a grand total of 38 points, putting him in 19th place out of 26.

== Discography ==
=== Extended plays ===
List of EPs, with selected details
Title	Details
Yaksa Yaksa	Released: 11 July 2019; Label: Tokio Drift; Formats: Digital download, streaming
Epic Tax Party	Released: 7 June 2021; Label: Self-released; Formats: Digital download, streaming
No Rules! Megamix	Released: 14 June 2024; Label: All Day Entertainment Oy; Formats: Digital download, streaming

=== Singles ===
Title	Year	Peak chart positions			Album or EP
Title	Year	FIN	LTU	SWE	Album or EP
"No Rules!" (Note: The song features uncredited vocals by Henri Piispanen.)	2024	6	35	82	No Rules! Megamix
"Paperclip"	2024	—	—	—	Non-album singles
"What's My Name"	2025	—	—	—	Non-album singles
"Need Your Heart"	2026	—	—	—	Non-album singles
"—" denotes a recording that did not chart or was not released in that territory.

== Notes ==
Awards and achievements
Preceded by Käärijä with "Cha Cha Cha"	Finland in the Eurovision Song Contest; 2024	Succeeded by Erika Vikman with "Ich komme"
