= Finland in the Eurovision Song Contest 2024 =

- Eurovision Song Contest 2024
- Participating broadcaster: Yleisradio (Yle)
- Country: Finland
- Selection process: Uuden Musiikin Kilpailu 2024
- Selection date: 10 February 2024

Competing entry
- Song: "No Rules!"
- Artist: Windows95man
- Songwriters: Henri Piispanen; Jussi Roine; Teemu Keisteri

Placement
- Semi-final result: Qualified (7th, 59 points)
- Final result: 19th, 38 points

Participation chronology

Finland was represented at the Eurovision Song Contest 2024 with the song "No Rules!" performed by Windows95man, featuring uncredited live vocals from Henri Piispanen. The Finnish participating broadcaster, Yleisradio (Yle), organised the national final Uuden Musiikin Kilpailu 2024 in order to select its entry for the contest.

Finland was drawn to compete in the first semi-final of the Eurovision Song Contest which took place on 7 May 2024. Performing during the show in position 10, "No Rules!" was announced among the top 10 entries of the first semi-final and therefore qualified to compete in the final on 11 May. It was later revealed that Finland placed seventh out of the 15 participating countries in the semi-final with 59 points. In the final, Finland performed in position 17 and placed nineteenth out of the 25 participating countries, scoring 38 points.

== Background ==
Prior to the 2024 contest, Yleisradio (Yle) had participated in the Eurovision Song Contest representing Finland fifty-six times since its first entry in 1961. It had won the contest once in 2006 with the song "Hard Rock Hallelujah" performed by Lordi. In the 2023 contest, "Cha Cha Cha" performed by Käärijä finished first in the televote and second overall.

As part of its duties as participating broadcaster, Yle organises the selection of its entry in the Eurovision Song Contest and broadcasts the event in the country. Yle had been selecting its entries for the contest through national final competitions that had varied in format over the years. Between 1961 and 2011, a selection show that was often titled Suomen euroviisukarsinta highlighted that the purpose of the program was to select a song for Eurovision. However, since 2012, the broadcaster had organised the selection show Uuden Musiikin Kilpailu (UMK), which focuses on showcasing new music with the winning song being selected as the Finnish Eurovision entry for that year. Yle confirmed their intentions to participate at the 2024 contest on 14 May 2023, announcing that its entry would again be selected through Uuden Musiikin Kilpailu.

== Before Eurovision ==
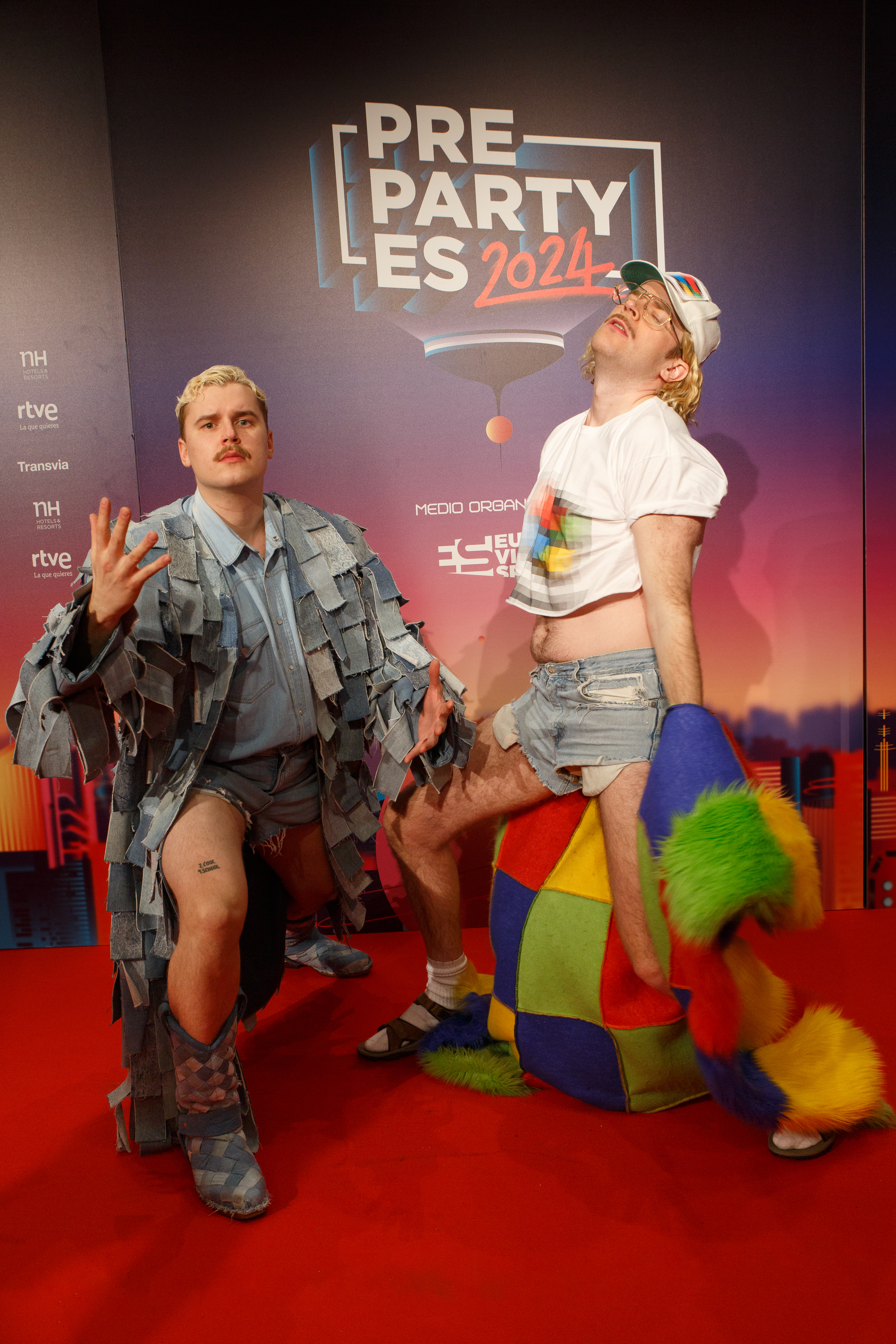
Windows95man and Henri Piispanen, winners of Uuden Musiikin Kilpailu 2024, at the PrePartyES event in Madrid

=== Uuden Musiikin Kilpailu 2024 ===
Uuden Musiikin Kilpailu 2024 was the thirteenth edition of Uuden Musiikin Kilpailu (UMK), the music competition that selects Finland's entries for the Eurovision Song Contest. The competition consisted of a final on 10 February 2024, held at Nokia Arena in Tampere and hosted by Pilvi Hämäläinen, Benjamin and Viivi Pumpanen.

==== Competing entries ====
A submission period was opened by Yle which lasted between 21 August 2023 and 24 August 2023. At least one of the writers and the lead singer(s) had to hold Finnish citizenship or live in Finland permanently in order for the entry to qualify to compete. A panel of nine experts appointed by Yle selected seven entries for the competition from the 419 received submissions. The experts were Tapio Hakanen (Head of Music at YleX), Aija Puurtinen (vocal coach at Sibelius Academy), Amie Borgar (Head of Music at Yle X3M and Yle Vega), Anssi Autio (UMK producer), Johan Lindroos (Head of Music at Yle Radio Suomi), Jussi Mäntysaari (Head of Music at Nelonen Media), Juha-Matti Valtonen (UMK TV director), Katri Norrlin (music editor at YleX) and Samuli Väänänen (Senior Editor at Spotify Finland). The competing entries were presented on 10 January 2024, while their music videos were released between 11 and 19 January 2024.

Artist	Song	Songwriter(s)
Cyan Kicks	"Dancing with Demons"	Dan Lancaster; Elize Ryd; Niila Perkkiö; Sara Ryan; Susanna Alexandra
Jesse Markin	"Glow"	Jesse Markin; Totte Rautiainen
Mikael Gabriel and Nublu	"Vox populi"	Aniachunamoso Nnebedum; Elias Hjelm; Johannes Naukkarinen; Jukka Immonen; Markkus Pulk; Mikael Gabriel Sohlman; Omar Aberkane; Teemu Javanainen
Sara Siipola	"Paskana"	Emmi Hakala; Kaisa Korhonen; Mikko Koivunen; Sara Siipola
Sexmane	"Mania"	Daniel Okas; Edward Maximilian Sene; Jussi "Jussifer" Karvinen; Santeri Kauppinen
Sini Sabotage	"Kuori mua"	Aleksanteri Hulkko; Sini-Maria Makkonen; Sonny Kylä-Liuhala; Veikka Erkola; Vilma Virintie
Windows95man (Note: Featuring vocals by Henri Piispanen)	"No Rules!"	Henri Piispanen; Jussi Roine; Teemu Keisteri

==== Final ====
The final took place on 10 February 2024 where seven entries competed. "No Rules!" performed by Windows95man was selected as the winner by a combination of public votes (75%) and seven international jury groups from Armenia, Luxembourg, Slovenia, Spain, Sweden, Ukraine and the United Kingdom (25%). The viewers had a total of 882 points to award, while the juries had a total of 294 points to award. Each jury group distributed their points as follows: 2, 4, 6, 8, 10 and 12 points. The viewer vote was based on the percentage of votes each song achieved through the following voting methods: telephone, SMS and app voting. For example, if a song gains 10% of the viewer vote, then that entry would be awarded 10% of 882 points rounded to the nearest integer: 88 points. A total of 224,578 votes were cast during the show; no detailed figures for app voting were released due to the Yle app crashing during the voting window.

In addition to the performances of the competing entries, the show was opened by Kuumaa performing "Ylivoimainen", followed by host Benjamin with "Hoida mut", while the interval acts included host Pilvi Hämäläinen performing "Mon chéri", Katri Helena performing her 1979 Eurovision entry "Katson sineen taivaan", and Käärijä performing "Ruoska" (with Erika Vikman) and his 2023 Eurovision entry "Cha Cha Cha".

Final – 10 February 2024
R/O	Artist	Song	Jury	Televote			Total	Place
R/O	Artist	Song	Jury	Votes	Percentage	Points	Total	Place
1	Sini Sabotage	"Kuori mua"	38	6,872	3.06%	27	65	7
2	Cyan Kicks	"Dancing with Demons"	48	20,392	9.08%	80	128	4
3	Jesse Markin	"Glow"	34	19,381	8.63%	76	110	5
4	Mikael Gabriel and Nublu	"Vox populi"	42	34,675	15.44%	136	178	3
5	Sara Siipola	"Paskana"	70	51,743	23.04%	203	273	2
6	Sexmane	"Mania"	34	18,864	8.40%	74	108	6
7	Windows95man	"No Rules!"	28	72,651	32.35%	285	313	1

Detailed international jury votes
R/O	Song	Armenia	Spain	Ukraine	Luxembourg	Slovenia	United Kingdom	Sweden	Total
R/O	Song	Armenia	Spain	Ukraine	Luxembourg	Slovenia	United Kingdom	Sweden	Total
1	"Kuori mua"	12			6	6	4	10	38
2	"Dancing with Demons"	6	8	10	10	2	8	4	48
3	"Glow"	2	2	4		8	6	12	34
4	"Vox populi"	4	10	12	8	4	2	2	42
5	"Paskana"	8	12	8	12	12	10	8	70
6	"Mania"	10	4	2	2	10		6	34
7	"No Rules!"		6	6	4		12		28
International jury spokespersons
Armenia – Maléna; Spain – Rafael Herrera; Ukraine – Tvorchi; Luxembourg – Eric Lehmann; Slovenia – Joker Out; United Kingdom – Olly Alexander; Sweden – Thobias Thorwid

==== Broadcasts and ratings ====
The competition was watched by an average of 1.244 million viewers in Finland (0.56 less than in 2023), with a peak viewership of 1.9 million equalling the 2022 edition and corresponding to over 35% of the Finnish population.

Local and international broadcasters of Uuden Musiikin Kilpailu 2024
Country	Broadcaster	Channel(s)	Commentator(s)	Refs.
Finland	Yle	Yle TV1	Mikko Silvennoinen (Finnish); Eva Frantz and Johan Lindroos (Swedish); Jaakko Oleander-Turja (English); Levan Tvaltvadze (Russian); Galyna Sergeyeva (Ukrainian); Miguel Peltomaa and Silva Belighti (Finnish Sign Language); Robin Hänninen (Finland-Swedish Sign Language); Linda Tammela (Northern Sami); Heli Huovinen (Inari Sami)	
Finland	Yle	Yle Areena	Mikko Silvennoinen (Finnish); Eva Frantz and Johan Lindroos (Swedish); Jaakko Oleander-Turja (English); Levan Tvaltvadze (Russian); Galyna Sergeyeva (Ukrainian); Miguel Peltomaa and Silva Belighti (Finnish Sign Language); Robin Hänninen (Finland-Swedish Sign Language); Linda Tammela (Northern Sami); Heli Huovinen (Inari Sami)	
Finland	Yle	YleX	—N/a	
Finland	Yle	Yle Radio Suomi	—N/a	
Finland	Yle	Yle X3M	Eva Frantz and Johan Lindroos (Swedish)	
Estonia	TV3		Robin Juhkental and Anu Saagim	
Netherlands	OutTV (Note: Also available in Belgium, France, Germany, Israel, Spain and Sweden)		Krista Siegfrids	
Spain	Ten		Luis Mesa	

=== Promotion ===
As part of the promotion of his participation in the contest, Windows95man attended the PrePartyES in Madrid on 30 March 2024, the London Eurovision Party on 7 April 2024, the Eurovision in Concert event in Amsterdam on 13 April 2024, the Nordic Eurovision Party in Stockholm on 14 April 2024, and the Copenhagen Eurovision Party on 4 May 2024. They will also perform at the Eurovision Village in Malmö on 9 May 2024. In addition, Yle organised a special "Easter egg hunt", with three eggs to be retrieved across three European cities (namely Malmö, Madrid and London) on 26 March, 30 March and 5 April 2024, respectively; each finder was awarded two tickets for the dress rehearsals of semi-final 1, where Windows95man is set to compete.

=== Calls for boycott ===
The inclusion of Israel in the list of participants of the 2024 contest, despite the humanitarian crisis resulting from Israeli military operations in the Gaza Strip during the Gaza war, sparked controversy in Finland as well as several other participating countries, with calls and petitions for broadcasters to boycott the event. In late December 2023, Yle stated that it was "closely following the situation in the Middle East" and holding discussions with the European Broadcasting Union (EBU) and other Nordic broadcasters; this was followed by a petition signed by over 1,500 Finnish music professionals demanding the broadcaster to withdraw from the event or to pressure for Israel to be excluded, to which Yle's head of creative content and media Ville Vilén responded that the broadcaster would not oppose the country's participation for the time being but that it had informed the EBU about the requests it was addressed.

UMK contestant Jesse Markin stated that, in case of victory, he would refuse to take part in Eurovision if Israel is permitted to compete; Sini Sabotage, Sara Siipola and Sexmane commented that they would have to consider whether to participate or not, with Sini Sabotage further saying that Israel should not compete at Eurovision. The executive producer for the competition, Anssi Autio, clarified that, as UMK is independent from Eurovision, these declarations did not affect their status as participants, adding that Yle had devised a backup plan in the event that the winner did not agree to represent Finland at the contest. The eventual UMK winner Windows95man stated ahead of the show that he would take part in Eurovision in case of victory, although he also expressed his opposition to Israel's participation. However, in an interview following his victory, he expressed his uncertainty over his participation, with Autio stating that the broadcaster would resume discussions waiting for the artist's final decision; in case of refusal, runner-up Siipola was reported to be the potential second choice. Windows95man and Henri Piispanen ultimately confirmed their presence in the contest on 20 February 2024.

While not mentioning Israel's participation in the contest, on 29 March 2024, Windows95man released a joint statement with other Eurovision 2024 entrants – namely Bambie Thug (Ireland), Gåte (Norway), Iolanda (Portugal), Megara (San Marino), Mustii (Belgium), Nemo (Switzerland), Olly Alexander (United Kingdom), Saba (Denmark) and Silvester Belt (Lithuania) – calling for "an immediate and lasting ceasefire" in Gaza as well as the return of the Israeli hostages held by Hamas.

== At Eurovision ==
The Eurovision Song Contest 2024 took place at the Malmö Arena in Malmö, Sweden, and consisted of two semi-finals held on the respective dates of 7 and 9 May and the final on 11 May 2024. All nations with the exceptions of the host country and the "Big Five" (France, Germany, Italy, Spain and the United Kingdom) were required to qualify from one of two semi-finals in order to compete in the final; the top ten countries from each semi-final progressed to the final. On 30 January 2024, an allocation draw was held to determine which of the two semi-finals, as well as which half of the show, each country would perform in; the EBU split up the competing countries into different pots based on voting patterns from previous contests, with countries with favourable voting histories put into the same pot. Finland was scheduled for the second half of the first semi-final. The shows' producers then decided the running order for the semi-finals; Finland was set to perform in position 10.

Ahead of the contest, Yle organised and broadcast for the fourth year in a row the Eurovision preview show Viisukupla – Eurovisionsbubblan; hosted by Katri Norrlin and Märta Westerlund, it consisted of two shows airing on Yle TV1 and Yle Areena on 28 April and 5 May 2024, and featured a panel composed of TV journalists Eva Frantz and Mikko Silvennoinen alongside a number of guest artists, who discussed and evaluated the competing entries, ultimately decreeing a favourite – namely Estonia's 5miinust and Puuluup with "(Nendest) narkootikumidest ei tea me (küll) midagi". In addition, as part of the Eurovision programming, Yle cooperated with DR and SVT alongside other EBU member broadcasters – namely ARD/WDR, the BBC, ČT, ERR, France Télévisions, NRK, NTR, RÚV and VRT – to produce and air a documentary titled ABBA – Against the Odds, on the occasion of the 50th anniversary of Sweden's first victory at the contest with "Waterloo" by ABBA.

In Finland, all the shows of the contest were broadcast on Yle TV1 (with live commentary in Finnish by Mikko Silvennoinen and in Swedish by Eva Frantz and Johan Lindroos), as well as online via Yle Areena (with additional commentary options in Inari Sámi by Heli Huovinen, Northern Sámi by Aslak Paltto, and Russian for the first semi-final and the final by Levan Tvaltvadze). The three shows were also broadcast on Yle Radio Suomi (with Finnish-language commentary by Toni Laaksonen and Sanna Pirkkalainen) and on Yle X3M (with Frantz and Lindroos' Swedish-language commentary). Yle also aired the TV1 broadcast in Sweden on TV Finland.

=== Performance ===
Windows95man and Henri Piispanen took part in technical rehearsals on 28 April and 1 May, followed by dress rehearsals on 6 and 7 May. For their performance of "No Rules!" at the contest, they are accompanied by dancers Jasmir Vesander and Jesse Wijnans (the latter having danced for Finland the previous year). Windows95man emerges from the inside of a giant denim covered egg.

=== Semi-final ===
Finland performed in position 10, following the entry from Slovenia and before the entry from Moldova. At the end of the show, the country was announced as a qualifier for the final.

=== Final ===
Following the semi-final, Finland was drawn to perform in the second half of the final. Finland performed in position 17, following the entry from Serbia and before the entry from Portugal. Windows95man and Henri Piispanen once again took part in dress rehearsals on 10 and 11 May before the final, including the jury final where the professional juries cast their final votes before the live show on 11 May. They performed a repeat of their semi-final performance during the final on 11 May. Finland placed nineteenth in the final, scoring 38 points; 31 points from the public televoting and 7 points from the juries.

=== Voting ===
Below is a breakdown of points awarded to Finland in the first semi-final and in the final. Voting during the three shows involved each country awarding sets of points from 1-8, 10 and 12: one from their professional jury and the other from televoting in the final vote, while the semi-final vote was based entirely on the vote of the public. The Finnish jury consisted of Sanni Kurkisuo, Mikko Niemelä, Kaisa Rönkkö, Pekka Ruuska, and Marcus Sjöström. In the first semi-final, Finland placed 7th with 59 points, marking a fourth consecutive qualification to the final for the country. In the final, Finland placed 19th with 38 points. Over the course of the contest, Finland awarded its 12 points to Croatia in the first semi-final, and to Switzerland (jury) and Israel (televote) in the final.

Yle initially appointed Käärijä, who represented Finland in the 2023 contest, as its spokesperson to announce the Finnish jury's votes in the final. He later withdrew from his role, stating that "giving out the points tonight does not feel right". The Finnish points were announced by Toni Laaksonen instead.

==== Points awarded to Finland ====
Points awarded to Finland (Semi-final 1)
Score	Televote
12 points	
10 points	
8 points	Sweden
7 points	
6 points	Iceland; Lithuania; Ukraine
5 points	Australia; Croatia; Ireland; Poland
4 points	United Kingdom
3 points	Germany; Slovenia
2 points	Luxembourg
1 point	Rest of the World

Points awarded to Finland (Final)
Score	Televote	Jury
12 points		
10 points		
8 points	Estonia	
7 points		
6 points		
5 points	Sweden	
4 points	Australia	San Marino
3 points	Ireland; United Kingdom	Australia
2 points	Denmark; Ukraine	
1 point	Iceland; Latvia; Norway; Poland	

==== Points awarded by Finland ====
Points awarded by Finland (Semi-final 1)
Score	Televote
12 points	Croatia
10 points	Ukraine
8 points	Ireland
7 points	Lithuania
6 points	Luxembourg
5 points	Australia
4 points	Portugal
3 points	Slovenia
2 points	Cyprus
1 point	Azerbaijan

Points awarded by Finland (Final)
Score	Televote	Jury
12 points	Israel	Switzerland
10 points	Croatia	Croatia
8 points	Switzerland	Ukraine
7 points	Estonia	Sweden
6 points	Ukraine	Ireland
5 points	Ireland	France
4 points	France	Luxembourg
3 points	Spain	Germany
2 points	Austria	Norway
1 point	Norway	Spain

==== Detailed voting results ====
Each participating broadcaster assembles a five-member jury panel consisting of music industry professionals who are citizens of the country they represent. Each jury, and individual jury member, is required to meet a strict set of criteria regarding professional background, as well as diversity in gender and age. No member of a national jury was permitted to be related in any way to any of the competing acts in such a way that they cannot vote impartially and independently. The individual rankings of each jury member as well as the nation's televoting results were released shortly after the grand final.

The following members comprised the Finnish jury:

- Sanni Kurkisuo
- Mikko Niemelä
- Kaisa Rönkkö
- Pekka Ruuska
- Marcus Sjöström

Detailed voting results from Finland (Semi-final 1)
R/O	Country	Televote	
R/O	Country	Rank	Points
01	Cyprus	9	2
02	Serbia	13	
03	Lithuania	4	7
04	Ireland	3	8
05	Ukraine	2	10
06	Poland	11	
07	Croatia	1	12
08	Iceland	12	
09	Slovenia	8	3
10	Finland		
11	Moldova	14	
12	Azerbaijan	10	1
13	Australia	6	5
14	Portugal	7	4
15	Luxembourg	5	6

Detailed voting results from Finland (Final)
R/O	Country	Jury							Televote	
R/O	Country	Juror A	Juror B	Juror C	Juror D	Juror E	Rank	Points	Rank	Points
01	Sweden	3	4	2	4	9	4	7	11	
02	Ukraine	4	8	3	2	4	3	8	5	6
03	Germany	5	10	8	9	16	8	3	16	
04	Luxembourg	2	19	21	10	10	7	4	20	
~~05~~	~~Netherlands~~ ‡ (Note: The Netherlands was disqualified prior to the final.)	~~25~~	~~5~~	~~10~~	~~18~~	~~11~~	~~12~~		N/A	
06	Israel	24	24	19	25	25	25		1	12
07	Lithuania	23	14	11	16	20	20		12	
08	Spain	13	6	5	21	24	10	1	8	3
09	Estonia	22	25	9	24	12	19		4	7
10	Ireland	10	2	15	3	1	5	6	6	5
11	Latvia	17	21	17	22	17	22		13	
12	Greece	18	11	20	13	15	18		19	
13	United Kingdom	6	16	14	12	13	13		17	
14	Norway	7	15	6	19	8	9	2	10	1
15	Italy	12	12	13	14	5	11		15	
16	Serbia	21	23	25	23	14	24		23	
17	Finland									
18	Portugal	16	18	24	11	18	21		22	
19	Armenia	15	22	22	8	7	15		14	
20	Cyprus	14	13	12	15	21	17		18	
21	Switzerland	11	3	1	1	2	1	12	3	8
22	Slovenia	19	7	23	7	19	14		21	
23	Croatia	1	1	4	6	6	2	10	2	10
24	Georgia	20	20	16	17	22	23		24	
25	France	8	17	7	5	3	6	5	7	4
26	Austria	9	9	18	20	23	16		9	2
