= Arion (band) =

Finnish metal band

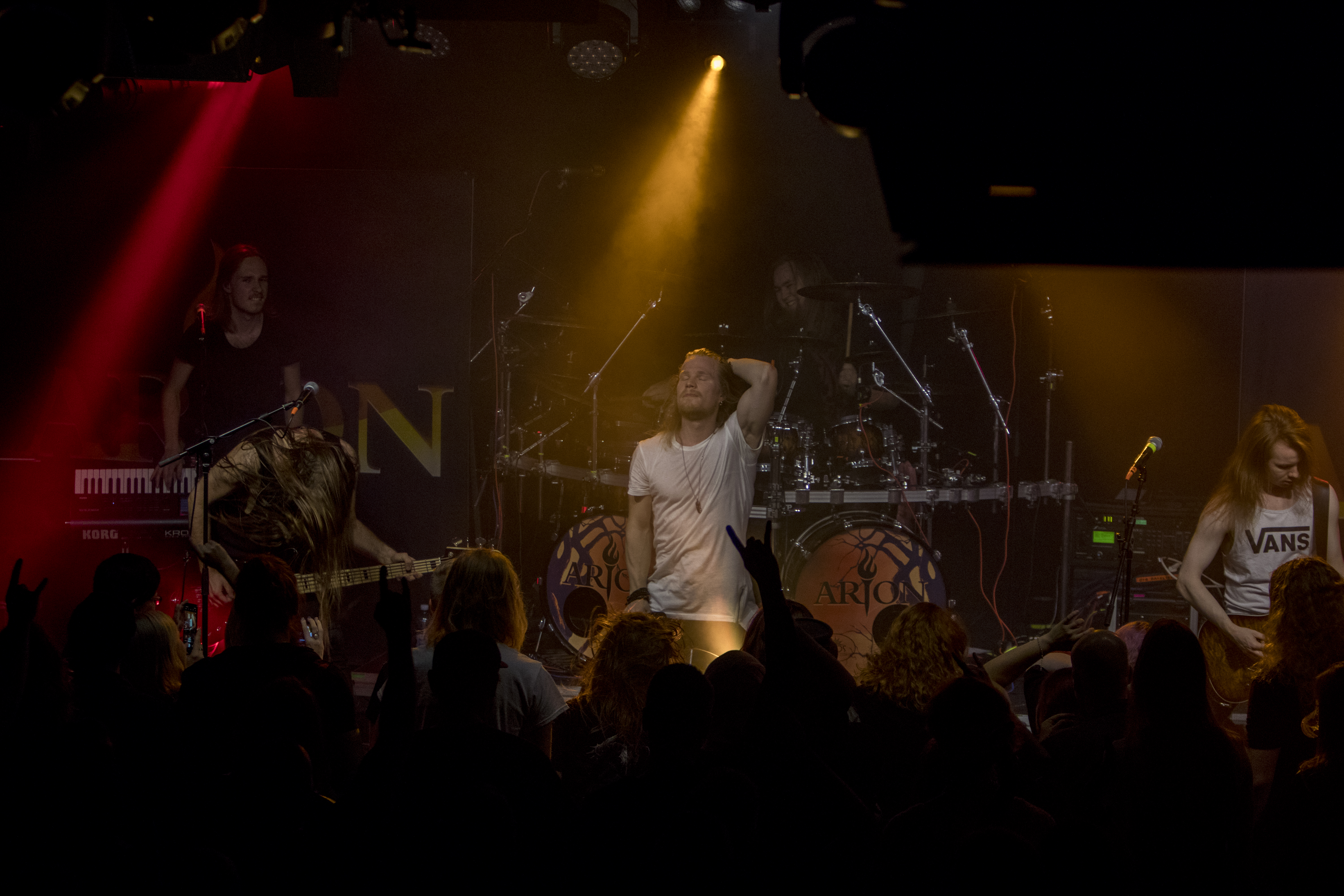
- Arion live in 2019

Background information
- Origin: Helsinki, Finland
- Genres: Symphonic metal; power metal
- Years active: 2011–present
- Labels: Ranka Kustannus OY; AFM; Marquee/Avalon
- Members: Lassi Vääränen; Iivo Kaipainen; Arttu Vauhkonen; Gege Velinov; Topias Kupiainen
- Past members: Viljami Holopainen
- Website: arion.fi

Arion is a Finnish heavy metal band formed in 2011 and led by guitarist Iivo Kaipainen. Arion gained fame after performing their first song "Lost" in Uuden Musikiin Kilpailu 2013, the Finnish national final for the Eurovision Song Contest. In March 2016 Arion recorded a duet "At the Break of Dawn" together with Elize Ryd from Amaranthe.

== Discography ==
=== Albums ===
Title	Details	Peak chart positions
Title	Details	FIN
Last of Us	Released: 22 August 2014; Label: Ranka Kustannus; Format: Digital download, CD	13
Life Is Not Beautiful	Released: 19 October 2018; Label: AFM; Format: Digital download, CD, vinyl	–
Vultures Die Alone	Released: 9 April 2021; Label: AFM; Format: Digital download, CD, vinyl	17
The Light That Burns the Sky	Released: 28 February 2025; Label: Reigning Phoenix Music; Format: Digital download, CD, vinyl	–

=== Singles ===
Title	Year	Album
"Lost"	2013	Last of Us
"Seven"	2013	Last of Us
"New Dawn"	2013	Non-album single
"Shadows"	2014	Last of Us
"Last of Us"	2015	Last of Us
"At the Break of Dawn" (featuring Elize Ryd)	2016	Life Is Not Beautiful
"Unforgivable"	2016	Life Is Not Beautiful
"No One Stands in My Way"	2017	Life Is Not Beautiful
"Through Your Falling Tears"	2018	Life Is Not Beautiful
"Seven" (2018 version)	2019	Non-album single
"Bloodline" (featuring Noora Louhimo)	2020	Vultures Die Alone
"In the Name of Love" (featuring Cyan Kicks)	2021	Vultures Die Alone
"Wings of Twilight" (featuring Melissa Bonny)	2024	The Light That Burns the Sky
"Wildfire"	2024	The Light That Burns the Sky
"From an Empire to a Fall"	2024	The Light That Burns the Sky
"Like the Phoenix I Will Rise"	2025	The Light That Burns the Sky
