= Henri Piispanen =

Finnish voice actor and musician

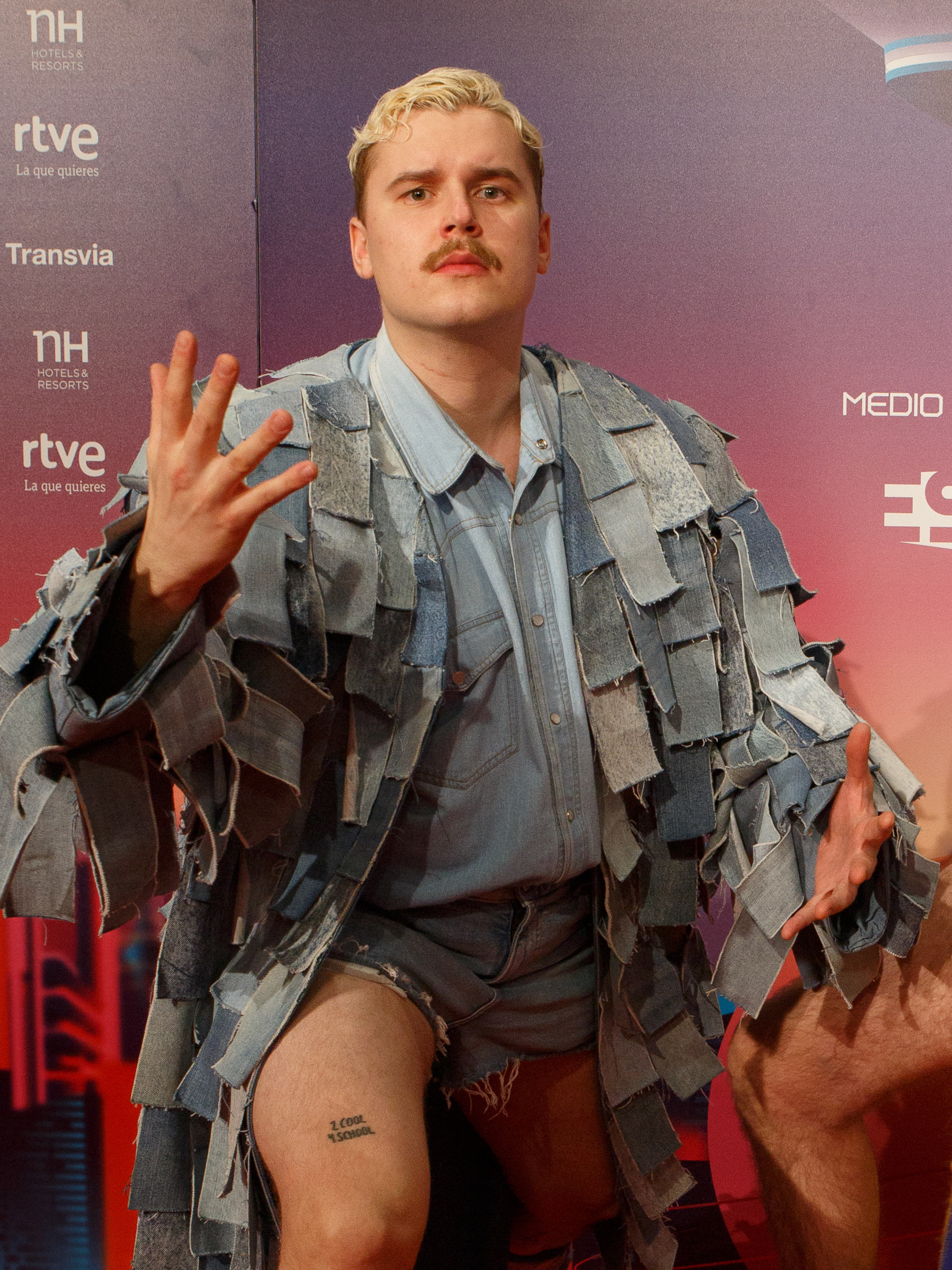
- Piispanen in 2024

Background information
- Born: 17 May 1994 (age 31)
- Genres: Indie rock; indie pop
- Occupations: Voice actor; singer-songwriter; presenter
- Years active: 1998–present
- Member of: Pasa; Kontio Polaris

Henri Piispanen (born 17 May 1994) is a Finnish voice actor, singer-songwriter and television presenter. Following his win at Uuden Musiikin Kilpailu 2024 with Windows95man, the duo represented Finland in the Eurovision Song Contest 2024 with the song "No Rules!", of which he was the producer and uncredited vocalist. As a voice actor, he has voiced many animated films and television shows in Finnish.

== Career ==
Piispanen is the singer and multi-instrumentalist of the band Pasa and the singer and keyboardist of the band Kontio Polaris.

Piispanen has voiced Finnish dubs of television shows and films such as Lewis in Meet the Robinsons, the titular character in Kick Buttowski: Suburban Daredevil, Raphael in Teenage Mutant Ninja Turtles, Hiro Hamada in Big Hero 6, Adrien Agreste in Miraculous: Tales of Ladybug & Cat Noir, Craig Williams in Craig of the Creek, Chase in PAW Patrol and Lloyd Garmadon in Ninjago. He was a host of the Finnish television series Summeri in 2012,

=== Eurovision Song Contest 2024 ===
Piispanen was the primary songwriter and producer of the song "No Rules!", intended to be performed at Uuden Musiikin Kilpailu 2024, the Finnish national selection for the Eurovision Song Contest 2024, by Teemu Keisteri, known by his persona Windows95man, and another uncredited singer, whilst Piispanen would simply be a songwriter and producer. However, Keisteri expressed in an interview how he struggled to find a singer with the required vocal ability to sing the technically challenging chorus of the song, and that Piispanen was the only singer he could find with a high enough vocal range, hence his eventual role as a performer in the song alongside Keisteri. The duo went on to win the event, winning the televote despite coming last in the jury vote, giving the pair the right to represent Finland in Eurovision. On 7 May 2024, Keisteri and Piispanen qualified to the Grand Final held on 11 May 2024.

Awards and achievements
Preceded by Käärijä with "Cha Cha Cha"	Finland in the Eurovision Song Contest; 2024; With: Windows95man	Succeeded by Erika Vikman with "Ich komme"
