= No Rules! =

2024 song by Windows95man

Single by Windows95man
- Released: 16 January 2024
- Genre: Europop
- Length: 2:55
- Label: All Day Entertainment
- Songwriters: Henri Piispanen; Jussi Roine; Teemu Keisteri

Windows95man singles chronology
"Epic Tax Party" (2021)	"No Rules!" (2024)	"Paperclip" (2024)

Music video
- "No Rules!" on YouTube

Eurovision Song Contest 2024 entry
- Country: Finland
- Artist: Windows95man
- With: Henri Piispanen
- Language: English
- Composers: Henri Piispanen; Jussi Roine; Teemu Keisteri
- Lyricists: Henri Piispanen; Jussi Roine; Teemu Keisteri

Finals performance
- Semi-final result: 7th
- Semi-final points: 59
- Final result: 19th
- Final points: 38

Entry chronology
- ◄ "Cha Cha Cha" (2023)
- "Ich komme" (2025) ►

Official performance video
- "No Rules!" (First Semi-Final) on YouTube "No Rules!" (Grand Final) on YouTube

"No Rules!" is a song by Finnish visual artist Teemu Keisteri, known professionally by his stage name persona, Windows95man. It was written and composed by Henri Piispanen, Jussi Roine, and Keisteri, and released on 16 January 2024 through All Day Entertainment Oy. The song represented Finland in the Eurovision Song Contest 2024, where it placed 19th with 38 points at the grand final.

== Background and composition ==
"No Rules" was composed and written by Henri Piispanen, Jussi Roine, and Teemu Keisteri. In interviews, Keisteri has stated that the song spreads a message that advocates to not "take everything so seriously", with an intent for Keisteri to be as relaxed as possible while performing the song. In addition, the song title refers to Keisteri's mantra that he has utilized throughout his life. Keisteri has also stated a desire to bring out the Finnish people's nature of being "looney-tunes deep inside". In a Wiwibloggs analysis written by Ruxandra Tudor, they stated that the song represented "the essence of freedom, advocating for unrestrained self-expression and living life to the fullest", defending the singer's right to live their true identity.

Keisteri partnered with singer and actor Henri Piispanen after Keisteri needed a singer who was capable to hit higher notes than him. Keisteri and Piispanen were announced to compete in Uuden Musiikin Kilpailu 2024 on 10 January 2024, with the song officially premiering six days later.

== Music video and promotion ==
Along the song's premiere, an accompanying music video was released on the same day. To further promote the song, Keisteri announced his intents to participate in various Eurovision pre-parties throughout the months of March and April 2024, including Pre-Party ES on 30 March, the London Eurovision Party on 7 April, Eurovision in Concert on 13 April, and the Nordic Eurovision Party on 14 April.

== Critical reception ==
=== Finnish media ===
The song has received varying reviews from multiple beat reporters. Helsingin Sanomat's Juuso Määttänen gave a neutral analysis of the song, declaring that the Finnish people decided to "show the middle finger to the [jury]... [and] enter Eurovision with a joke [entry]... however, it is also to the song's credit that it sounded really good".

=== Eurovision related-and other media ===
ESC Insight's Ben Robertson praised the song and its message, giving compliments to the song's "simplicity" and for being a more "silly" song compared to other songs sent to the Eurovision Song Contest, stating his belief that the contest shouldn't only be serious songs. In a Wiwibloggs review containing several reviews from several critics, the song was rated 4.63 out of 10 points, earning 36th out of 37 songs on the site's annual ranking. Another review conducted by ESC Bubble that contained reviews from a combination of readers and juries rated the song fifth out of the 15 songs in the Eurovision semi-final "No Rules" was in. ESC Beat's Doron Lahav ranked the song 36th overall, writing that the song was "quite weak" and repetitive. Erin Adam of The Scotsman rated the song four out of 10 points, deeming the song to be "a real marmite entry".

The BBC's Mark Savage called the song "fatally generic", saying Windows95man was "trying too hard to stand out". Vulture's Jon O'Brien ranked the song 19th out of 37 songs, thinking that it is "much easier on the ear than its predecessor", referring to Käärijä's "Cha Cha Cha". He further wrote that it was "mirroring the classic Eurodance brilliantly parodied last summer by Kyle Gordon", referring to Gordon's "Planet of the Bass".

== Eurovision Song Contest ==
=== Uuden Musiikin Kilpailu 2024 ===
Finland's broadcaster Yleisradio Oy (Yle) organized a seven-entry competition, Uuden Musiikin Kilpailu 2024, consisting of a single grand final to select its entrant for the Eurovision Song Contest 2024 on 10 February 2024. The edition was the 13th iteration of the contest. The winner of the final was selected by a 75/25 combination vote of televoting and juries, respectively. Keisteri was revealed to be a competitor in Uuden Musiikin Kilpailu 2024 on 10 January 2024, with the song being announced six days later. The performance featured Keisteri hatching himself from a giant egg made out of denim jeans, with him wearing a retro Microsoft Windows shirt and baseball cap. The main singer of the song, Henri Piispanen, also appears on top of the egg, wearing a patchwork cape made of denim and a pair of jorts. Nearing the end of the performance, Keisteri also gets his own pair of jorts that sprays pyrotechnics. In the grand final, although the song came last in with the jury vote, the song won the televote by a wide margin, earning a combined total of 313 points; 40 more than the runner-up, Sara Siipola's "Paskana". As a result of the victory, the song won rights to represent Finland in the Eurovision Song Contest 2024.

=== At Eurovision ===
The Eurovision Song Contest 2024 took place at the Malmö Arena in Malmö, Sweden, and consisted of two semi-finals held on the respective dates of 7 and 9 May, and the final on 11 May 2024. During the allocation draw on 30 January 2024, Finland was drawn to compete in the first semi-final, performing in the second half of the show. The duo were later drawn to perform tenth, ahead of Slovenia's Raiven and before Moldova's Natalia Barbu.

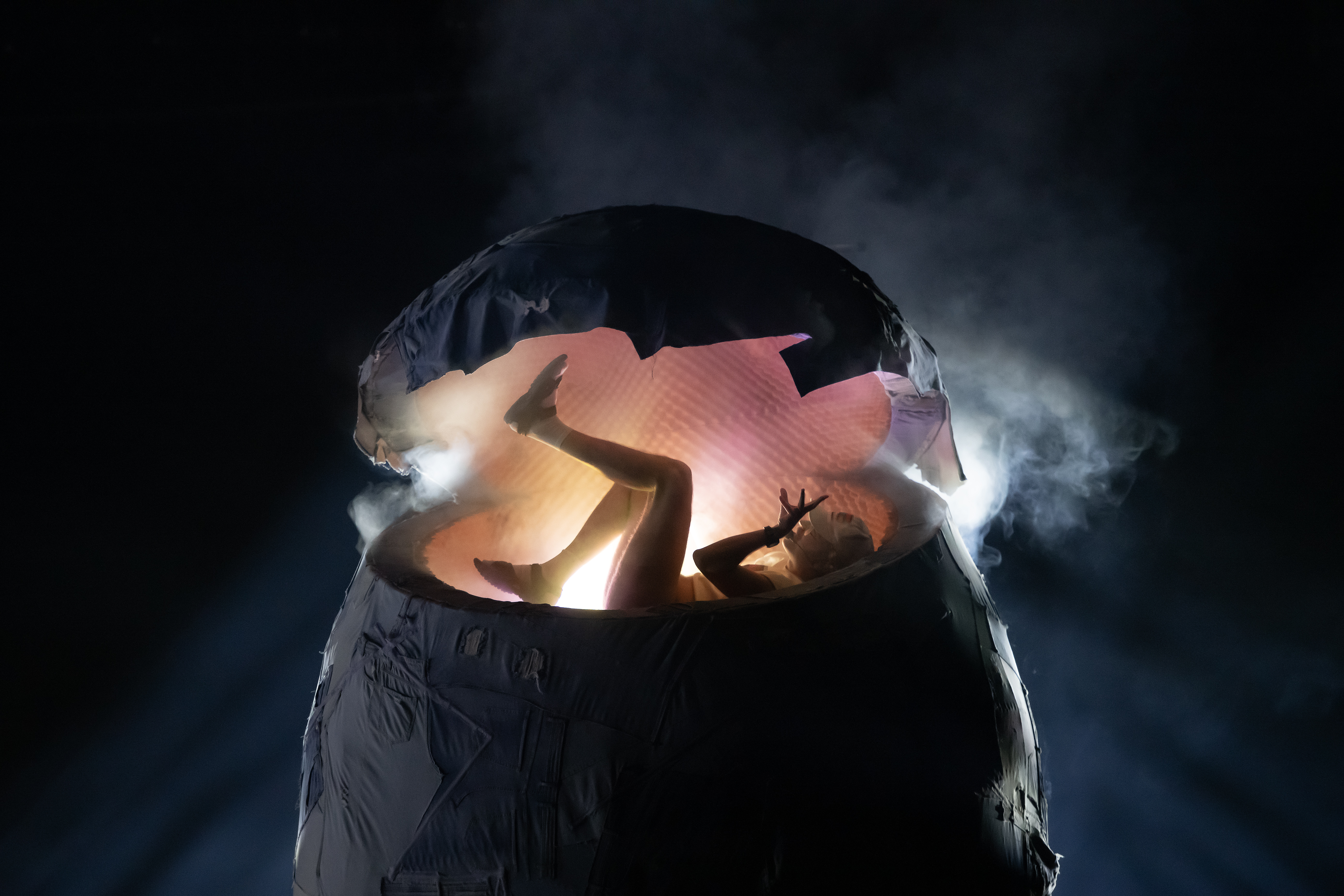
Keisteri performing "No Rules!" at a dress rehearsal before the first semi-final for Eurovision 2024.

For its Eurovision performance, Keisteri wore a censored version of his signature Windows 95 T-shirt, with Piispanen wearing the same outfit from the Uuden Musiikin Kilpailu performance. Along with the duo, two backing dancers were also featured in the performance. The Eurovision performance was described as "quite similar" to the one given in UMK; like the UMK performance, Keisteri is shown in a giant denim jean egg at the beginning and later puts on a pair of jorts during the end of the performance. The performance also featured camera shots that implied that Keisteri did not wear any underwear; however, he did wear nude-coloured underwear. in response to criticism regarding said shots, Keisteri stated that "I don't care anymore... adults should little bit learn, and let it go a little bit and it's not so serious that you see (a) little bit (of) my ass [sic]". "No Rules!" finished in seventh, scoring 59 points and securing a position in the Eurovision grand final.

The duo performed a repeat of their performance in the grand final on 11 May. The song was performed in 17th, ahead of Serbia's Teya Dora and before Portugal's Iolanda. After the results were announced, they finished in 19th with 38 points, with a split score of seven points from juries and 31 points from public televoting. The song received no sets of the maximum 12 points in either category. Regarding the former, the most awarded was a set of four points given by San Marino. With the latter, the maximum awarded was a set of eight points given by Estonia. In response to his finish, he stated content that "we pulled through under that heavy pressure. It's been a wild two weeks. We had a lot of fun on stage, and everything went smoothly."

== Track listing ==
Digital download/streaming

1. "No Rules!" – 2:55

Digital download/streaming – Spa Mix

1. "No Rules! – Spa Mix" – 2:44

Digital download/streaming – classical version

1. "No Rules! (Classical version)" – 3:04

Digital download/streaming – EP

1. "No Rules!" – 2:55
2. "No Rules! – Sturgeon Happy Hardcore Remix" – 3:55
3. "No Rules! – Sturgeon Happy Hardcore Remix (extended version)" – 4:40
4. "No Rules! – Rave Remix" – 2:16
5. "No Rules! – Spa Mix" – 2:44
6. "No Rules! – Classical version" – 3:04

== Charts ==
Chart performance for "No Rules!"
Chart (2024)	Peak position
Finland (Suomen virallinen lista)	6
Lithuania (AGATA)	35
Sweden (Sverigetopplistan)	82
UK Singles Downloads (Official Charts)	50
UK Singles Sales (OCC)	50

== Release history ==
Release history and formats for "No Rules!"
Country	Date	Format(s)	Version	Label	Ref.
Various	16 January 2024	Digital download; streaming	Single	All Day Entertainment Oy	
Various	19 April 2024	Digital download; streaming	Spa Mix	All Day Entertainment Oy	
Various	26 April 2024	Digital download; streaming	Classical	All Day Entertainment Oy	
Various	14 June 2024	Digital download; streaming	Extended play	All Day Entertainment Oy	
