= Cyan Kicks =

Finnish rock band

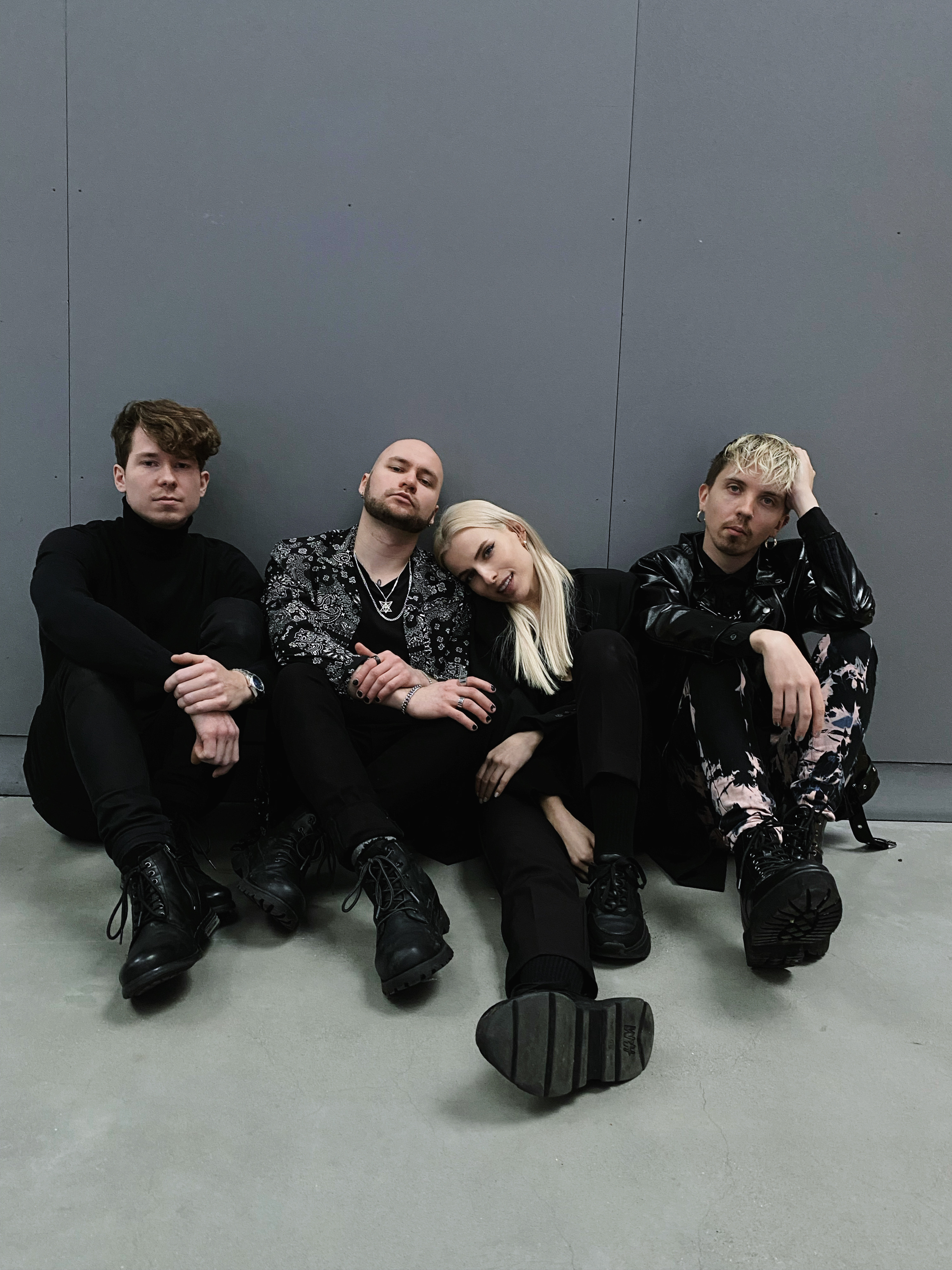
- From left to right Pietari, Leevi, Susanna, Niila

Background information
- Origin: Helsinki, Finland
- Genres: Alternative rock; electronic rock; pop rock
- Years active: 2016–Present
- Labels: Ranka Kustannus
- Members: Susanna Alexandra; Niila Perkkiö; Leevi Erkkilä; Pietari Reijonen

Cyan Kicks is a Finnish rock band from Helsinki, founded in 2016. The band combines heavy rock, pop melodies and electronic music in their sound.

== Background ==
The group's vocalist Susanna Saarinen started public appearances in the cover duo she founded with Pasi Sundelin. Saarinen participated in the Idols competition in 2008. She found guitarist Niila Perkkiö in the announcements of the muusikoiden.net website and in 2012 they founded their first band Fuse!, which was compared to Paramore.

== Career ==
Susanna Alexandra, Niila Perkkiö, bassist Leevi Erkkilä and drummer Pietari Reijonen founded the band Cyan Kicks in 2016. Band members Susanna Alexandra and Niila Perkkiö got to know each other already in 2011. The band signed a recording contract with the Finnish record label Ranka Kustannus in June 2017. The band's first single "Feathers" was released in July 2017. The band's second single "Gasoline" was released in January 2018, and it played on the national YleX radio channel. The band was described in the international media as a promising export product. Cyan Kicks released their debut studio album, entitled I Don't Love You in August 2019. The band received an Emma nomination for the best rock album of the year.

Cyan Kick's first foreign concerts in the summer of 2020 were canceled due to the COVID-19 pandemic and the band started making new music. The band's EP Not Your Kind was released in February 2021. The album had seven songs. In summer 2021, the band performed as a warm-up act at the Apocalyptica gig in Tampere. Elize Ryd, the female vocalist of the Swedish metal band Amaranthe, was a guest soloist at the gig. Ryd and Cyan Kicks wanted to collaborate and about a week after the show they made the song "Hurricane" in one day of work.

By January 2022, the band's music had been streamed more than 10 million times. It was then reported that the band would compete in the Uuden Musiikin Kilpailu 2022 with the song "Hurricane". The song was produced by American musician-producer Chris Walla and was also mixed by Zakk Cervini. The song's exclamation points feature a choir made up of the band's fans. In the competition, the band finished second. During 2023 they did a tour with the Swedish band Smash into pieces.

Cyan Kicks were selected to compete in Uuden Musiikin Kilpailu 2024 with the song "Dancing with Demons".

== Musical style ==
Cyan Kick's genres have been considered alternative rock and disco metal. The band combines heavy metal, electronic rock and pop in their music. In 2022, the band described their music as modern rock combining different styles.

== Discography ==
=== Studio albums ===
List of studio albums, with selected details
Title	Details	Peak chart positions
Title	Details	FIN
I Don't Love You	Released: 23 August 2019; Label: Ranka Kustannus; Formats: Digital download, streaming	—
I Never Said 4ever	Released: 5 May 2023; Label: Ranka Kustannus; Formats: Digital download, streaming	19
Come Hell, Come High Water	Released: 10 October 2025; Label: Ranka Kustannus; Formats: Digital download, streaming	—
"—" denotes an album that did not chart or was not released in that territory.

=== Extended plays ===
List of EPs, with selected details
Title	Details
Not Your Kind	Released: 26 February 2021; Label: Ranka Kustannus; Formats: Digital download, streaming

=== Singles ===
==== As lead artist ====
Title	Year	Peak chart positions	Album or EP
Title	Year	FIN	Album or EP
"Feathers"	2017	—	I Don't Love You
"Gasoline"	2018	—	I Don't Love You
"Rockabye"	2018	—	I Don't Love You
"Satellite"	2018	—	I Don't Love You
"Tidal Wave"	2019	—	I Don't Love You
"Heart"	2019	—	I Don't Love You
"Mistake"	2019	—	I Don't Love You
"Let Me Down Slowly"	2019	—	Not Your Kind
"Wish You Well"	2020	—	Not Your Kind
"Beat of My Heart"	2020	—	Not Your Kind
"The Flood"	2020	—	Not Your Kind
"Invincible"	2021	— (Note: "Invincible" did not enter the Official Finnish Charts, but peaked at #16 on the Official Finnish Airplay Chart.)	I Never Said 4ever
"Died Enough For You"	2021	—	Non-album single
"Hurricane"	2022	— (Note: "Hurricane" did not enter the Official Finnish Charts, but peaked at #24 on the Official Finnish Airplay Chart.)	I Never Said 4ever
"See the Light"	2022	—	I Never Said 4ever
"Someone Like You"	2022	—	I Never Said 4ever
"Into You"	2023	—	I Never Said 4ever
"Addicted"	2023	—	I Never Said 4ever
"Dancing With Demons"	2024	14	Come Hell, Come High Water
"Don't You Say I Didn't Warn You"	2024	—	Come Hell, Come High Water
"Alone"	2024	—	Come Hell, Come High Water
"Middle of a Breakdown"	2025	—	Come Hell, Come High Water
"Echo"	2025	—	Come Hell, Come High Water
"Flowers"	2025	—	Come Hell, Come High Water
"I Love U2"	2025	—	Come Hell, Come High Water
"—" denotes a recording that did not chart or was not released in that territory.

==== As featured artist ====
Title	Year	Album
"Fail Me" (Thousand Thoughts featuring Cyan Kicks)	2021	Non-album single
"In the Name of Love" (Arion featuring Cyan Kicks)	2021	Vultures Die Alone

=== Music videos ===
List of music videos, showing year released and directors
Title	Year	Director(s)
"Feathers"	2017	Nilla Perkkiö, Susanna Saarinen and Pietari Reijonen
"Gasoline"	2018	Max Majander
"Satellite"	2018	Max Majander
"Rockabye"	2019	Max Majander and Nea Athiainen
"Tidal Wave"	2019	Max Majander
"Wish You Well"	2020	Max Majander and Susanna Aleksandra
"Beat Of My Heart"	2020	Max Majander and M.Lindqvist
"The Flood"	2021	Max Majander and M.Lindqvist
"Invincible"	2021	Max Majander
"Hurricane"	2022	Heikki Släen
"Someone Like You"	2022	Jarkko Vuorela
"I Never Said 4ever"	2023	Max Majander
"Lostboi"	2023	Max Majander and Aaro Karjalainen
"Dancing with Demons"	2024	Heikki Släen
"Don't You Say I Didn't Warn You"	2024	Max Majander
"Alone"	2024	Niila Perkkiö, Susanna Alexandra
"Middle of a Breakdown"	2025	Unknown
"Echo"	2025	Mojandre
"I Love U2"	2025	Niila Perkkiö, Susanna Alexandra, Leevi Erkkilä
