= Jos mä oisin rehellinen =

Studio album by Emma & Matilda
- Released: September 19, 2025
- Label: Warner Music Finland
- Producer: Atso Soivio

Jos mä oisin rehellinen (If I Were Being Honest) is Finnish duo Emma & Matilda's debut album, released by Warner Music Finland on 19 September, 2025. The album was produced by Atso Soivio. The album immediately rose to first place on the Finnish music charts.
