= Emma & Matilda =

Finnish musical duo

Emma & Matilda in 2024

Emma & Matilda is a Finnish folk-pop musical duo, consisting of singers Emma Johansson and Matilda Malkamäki. The group released their first single, "Joku jonka sä haluut," in November of 2022.

The group's first EP was released in May of 2023 and rose to ninth place on Finland's Official Album List in its first week.

== Members ==
Emma Johansson and Matilda Malkamäki met at the Tampere High School for the Performing Arts. Johansson was born in Porvoo and went to study in Tampere as a 15-year-old. Malkamäki was born in Tampere.

Johansson and Malkamäki generally write their own music. In addition to writing for her own group, Emma & Matilda, Johansson has written songs for other singers and bands. In 2024, Johansson won the 2024 Emma Gala prize for the "Best Songwriter" for writing "Timanttei" for the Finnish singer Mirella.

== Discography ==
=== Studio albums ===
Title	Release details	Highest Chart Ranking
Jos mä oisin rehellinen	Release date: 19 September 2025; Format: Digital; Label: Warner Music Finland	1

=== EPs ===
Title	Release details	Highest Chart Ranking
Siellä on kaikki niin ihanaa	Release date: 19 May 2023; Format: Digital; Label: Warner Music Finland	9
Toinen vuosi	Release date: 8 March 2024; Format: Digital; Label: Warner Music Finland	13

=== Compilations ===
Title	Release details	Highest Chart Ranking
Siellä on kaikki niin ihanaa / Toinen vuosi	Release date: 17 May 2024; Format: Vinyl; Label: Warner Music Finland	35

=== Singles ===
Name	Year	Peak chart positions		Album
Name	Year	FIN Singles	FIN Radio	Album
"Joku jonka sä haluut"	2022	–	–	Siellä on kaikki niin ihanaa
"Sä saat mut"	2023	–	–	Siellä on kaikki niin ihanaa
"Veronica"	2023	31	–	Siellä on kaikki niin ihanaa
"Joku muu"	2023	13	–	Toinen vuosi
"Joululaulu"	2023	–	–	
"Huoleton"	2024	43	–	Toinen vuosi
"Toinen vuosi"	2024	–	–	Toinen vuosi
"Olivia"	2024	30	–	
"Mee jo"	2024	35	–	
"Levoton tuhkimo"	2024	16	34	
"Sisko"	2025	3	64	
"Kävi miten kävi" (JVG feat. Emma & Matilda)	2025	1	51	
"Sun tyttö"	2025	20	–	
"Rakkauden haudalla" (Vain elämää kausi 16) (with Lauri Haav)	2025	1	–	Vain elämää kausi 16
"Ihan kohta ohi" (with Kuumaa)	2026	3	–	Non-album singles
"Älä mee"	2026	5	–	Non-album singles
