= Turisti =

Finnish rapper (born 1997)

- Born: Harlova Makungila Vukulu; 28 January 1997 (age 29); Espoo, Finland
- Genres: Hip hop; trap; R&B
- Occupations: Rapper; songwriter; fashion designer
- Instrument: Vocals
- Years active: 2017–present

Harlova Makungila Vukulu (born 28 January 1997), known by his stage name Turisti, is a Finnish rapper, songwriter and fashion designer.

== Early life ==
Harlova Makungila Vukulu was born on 28 January 1997 in Espoo. His parents are from the Democratic Republic of the Congo and his family are Jehovah's Witnesses. Vukulu lived in a reception center for a short time as a child.

== Musical career ==
Vukulu became interested in rapping in 2017 through a school project while studying at the Finnish Business School. He has mentioned that he draws inspiration from American rappers such as XXXTentacion, Juice Wrld and Lil Uzi Vert. Vukulu has also mentioned anime as a major source of inspiration in his music.

In November 2022, Turisti released the song "Mietin ääneen". The lyrics of the song, which were interpreted as misogynistic, sparked discussion on social media. The song was removed from the streaming service Spotify and one venue cancelled the artist's concert.

== Personal life ==
Vukulu played football as a youth for, among others, HJK and PK-35 Vantaa A and B boys.

== Discography ==
=== Albums ===
- Maailmankiertue (2020)
- Linnunrata (2021)
- Traveller (2023)
- Roadman (2024)
- Magic City (2025)

=== EPs ===
- Interrail (2022)

=== Singles ===
- "Gran Turismo" (2018)
- "Puolet kesäst" (with Jore, 2019)
- "Vastuu" (with Melo and KC, 2019)
- "Aslak (Jeans)" (with Baka®, 2020)
- "01:52" (2020)
- "Canada Goose" (with william, 2021)
- "Kyynel" (2021)
- "Gunshit" (2022)
- "Tippa-T" (with Elastinen, 2022)
- "Tee tilaa" (with Bizi, 2022)
- "Huonoi uutisii" (2022)
- "Uudestaan" (2023)
- "Tällee näin" (2023)
- "Kiireinen nainen" (with Ibe, 2023)
- "Yks kaks" (2024)
- "Häivytään" (2024)
- "Lähetään menee" (2024)
- "Lightskinboy" (with Sexmane, 2024)
- "Diana" (2025)
