= Sexmane =

Finnish musical artist

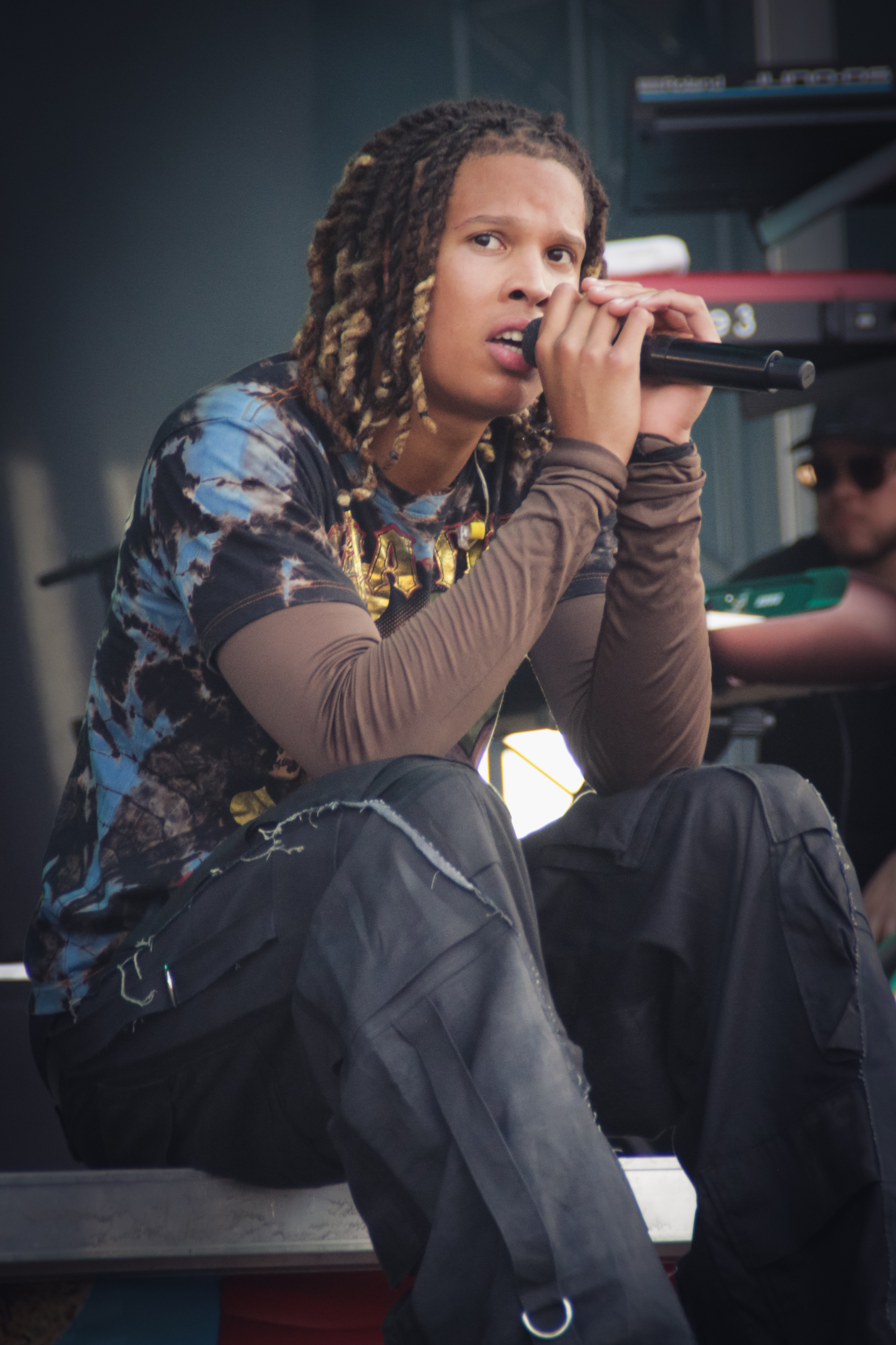
- Sexmane performing in Simerock in 2024

Background information
- Born: Edward Maximilian Sene; 13 October 2000 (age 25); Siilinjärvi, Finland
- Genres: Pop; rap; trap; R&B
- Occupations: Singer; rapper
- Instruments: Vocals; trumpet
- Years active: 2018–present
- Label: Sony Music (2021–present)

Edward Maximilian Sene (born 13 October 2000), known by his artist name Sexmane, is a Finnish singer and rapper. He came into popularity amongst Finns in 2019 when he released his album called Sextape.

== Life and career ==
Sene started writing music in 2016. In 2019, Sene self-published his debut album Sextape. The album stayed 80 weeks on Finland's official album chart and streamed gold. The opening track Mama has more than 11 million listens on Spotify. In October 2021, Sony released Sexmane's second album Väärinymmärretty, with the album Sexmane received four Emma nominations.

On 10 January 2024, he was announced as one of the participants of Uuden Musiikin Kilpailu 2024, the Finnish national final for the Eurovision Song Contest 2024, with the song "Mania".

== Personal life ==
Sene was born in Siilinjärvi, Finland, to a Laestadian family. Sene's father is from Senegal and his mother is Finnish. The family also includes four brothers Isaac, Adilio, Robin, Lucas and one sister Sofia. His brothers Isaac, Robin and Adilio are also musicians. Isaac participated Uuden Musiikin Kilpailu in 2022 with the song "Kuuma jäbä".

As of 2025, Sexmane is in a relationship with Finnish singer Mirella.

== Discography ==
=== Albums ===
List of albums, with selected details
Title	Details	Peak chart positions
Title	Details	FIN
Sextape	Released: 2019; Label: Self-distributed	16
Väärinymmärretty	Released: 2021; Label: Sony Music	5
Sextape II	Released: 2023; Label: Sony Music	1
Sanansaattaja	Released: 2024; Label: Sony Music	4

=== Singles ===
List of singles, with selected peak chart positions
Title	Year	Peak chart positions		Album
Title	Year	FIN	FIN Radio	Album
"Aikakone"	2018	—	—	Sextape
"Erilainen"	2019	—	—	Sextape
"2naamaa"	2019	—	—	Sextape
"Henki"	2021	—	—	Väärinymmärretty
"Fiilis" (featuring Fabe] and YB026)	2021	—	—	Väärinymmärretty
"40K"	2022	11	—	Sextape II
"Chillaa Veli"	2022	2	55	Sextape II
"Sekavaa Ja Hiton Vaikeet"	2022	3	—	Sextape II
"Gorilla" (featuring Nuteh Jonez)	2022	3	—	Sextape II
"Sexshow"	2022	13	—	Sextape II
"Äärirajoille II"	2023	1	—	
"Hallille"	2023	14	—	Non-album single
"Mania"	2024	4	—	Sanansaattaja
"Hulluus saa mut huutamaan"	2024	3	—	Sanansaattaja
"Mama We Made It" (featuring Melo)	2024	18	—	Sanansaattaja
"Riittämätön" (featuring Tomi Saario)	2024	2	—	Sanansaattaja
"Kuka siin netis on"	2025	6	—	Non-album singles
"Kuolematon"	2025	11	—	Non-album singles
"Rotta" (featuring Ibe)	2025	22	—	Non-album singles
"Rastat" (featuring Jukka Poika)	2025	5	—	Non-album singles
"Parempi mies"	2025	6	—	Non-album singles

=== Other charted songs ===
List of other charted songs, with selected peak chart positions
Title	Year	Peak chart positions	Album
Title	Year	FIN	Album
"V!ttu"	2024	12	Sanansaattaja
"Dubai"	2024	41	Sanansaattaja
"Dopamiini junkie" (featuring Senya)	2024	19	Sanansaattaja
