= Mirella (singer) =

Finnish singer (born 2005)

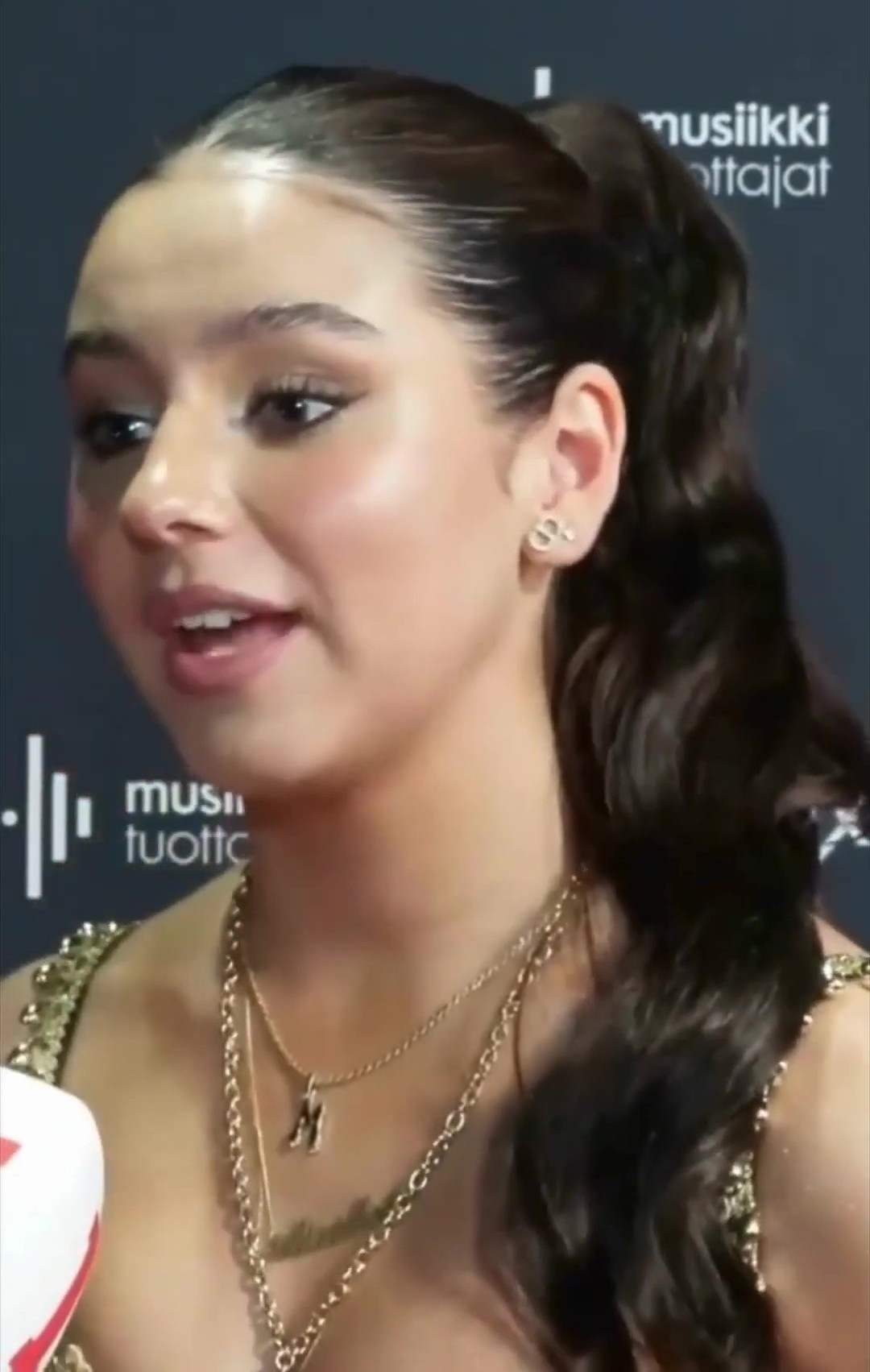
- Roininen at Emma-gaala 2025

Background information
- Born: Mirella Linéa Olivia Roininen; 8 May 2005 (age 21); Vantaa, Finland
- Genre: Pop
- Occupations: Singer; songwriter; dancer
- Years active: 2020–present
- Label: Universal Music Finland

Mirella Linéa Olivia Roininen (born 8 May 2005), is a Finnish singer, songwriter, and dancer. Roininen began her career in 2020, after winning the Yle Fem children's song contest Melodi Grand Prix, and was signed to Universal Music Finland in 2022. Her career breakthrough came in 2023 with the release of the single "Sua sattuu", which peaked within the top ten in Finland, followed by the release of four consecutive number-one hits and her number-one debut studio album Kunpa oisin kertonut (2024).

== Early life ==
Roininen was born on 8 May 2005 in Vantaa to a Swedish-speaking Finnish mother and father Tero Roininen, a Finn of partial Romani heritage. Her father is a musician and songwriter who belonged to the Finnish rap collective GG Caravan. Roininen has a younger brother, and is a Christian. While Roininen was not raised within Romani culture, she grew up listening to Romani music and experienced bullying and discrimination in primary school due to her Romani heritage. Her native language is Swedish, and she began writing songs in Swedish, followed by English.

Roininen has been active in singing and dancing ever since her childhood. She began dance classes at age two, and singing lessons at age 13. Roininen also attended a music school, where she learned how to play the piano. As a dancer, Roininen specialized in contemporary dance and appeared in a music video for Finnish singer Viivi. She stopped dancing in order to focus on singing at age 16.

Roininen began high school in Helsinki in 2021, studying music, but later transferred to the adult education program after her career breakthrough. She graduated in 2025.

== Career ==
Roininen began her career in 2020, after being selected as a contestant for Melodi Grand Prix, a children's song contest broadcast on Yle Fem. She competed with the song "Landet ingenstans", and went on to win the competition. She had previously taken part in the competition as a backup dancer in 2018, and was inspired to compete as a singer after participating in a karaoke contest. After winning Melodi Grand Prix, Roininen released the follow-up single "Idiot", which received airplay on Swedish radio.

=== 2023–present: Kunpa oisin kertonut and breakthrough ===
In 2022, Roininen was signed to Universal Music Finland after being discovered through TikTok by Kristiina Wheeler, who was working as an artists and repertoire manager at the label. Roininen went on to release her major-label debut single "Sua sattuu" in October 2023, also becoming her first song in the Finnish language. The song was her commercial breakthrough in Finland, peaking within the top ten and becoming certified gold within two months.

Following the success of "Sua sattuu", Roininen released the follow-up single "Timanttei" in January 2024. "Timanttei" became a smash hit in Finland, peaking at number-one while also attracting over 15 million views on TikTok before even its official release. The song was later chosen as the Song of the Year in a poll by Finnish music producers. Her success continued with the release of the singles "Uuteen eilisen", "Luotathan" with Lauri Haav, and "Löytää mut", all of which became number-one hits in Finland. Of her first five major-label singles, four ranked among Finland's ten most-streamed songs of 2024, with "Timanttei", "Luotathan", "Uuteen eiliseen" and "Sua sattuu" placing first, third, fourth and tenth, respectively. "Timanttei" would go on to become one of the most-streamed Finnish-language songs in Spotify's history, surpassing 40 million streams.

Roininen released her debut studio album Kunpa oisin kertonut in November 2024. The album went on to peak at number-one, be certified quadruple platinum in Finland, and break records as the most-streamed Finnish album in both its first day and first week of release.

== Personal life ==
As of 2025, Mirella is in a relationship with Finnish singer and rapper Sexmane.

== Discography ==
=== Studio albums ===
Title	Details	Peak chart positions
Title	Details	FIN
Kunpa oisin kertonut	Released: 1 November 2024; Label: Universal Music Finland; Formats: Digital download	1
Ja nyt mä kerron	Released: 13 November 2026; Label: Universal Music Finland; Formats: Digital download	2

=== Singles ===
Title	Year	Peak chart positions	Album
Title	Year	FIN	Album
"Landet ingenstans"	2020	—	Non-album singles
"Idiot"	2021	—	Non-album singles
"Sua sattuu"	2023	7	Kunpa oisin kertonut
"Timanttei"	2024	1	Kunpa oisin kertonut
"Uuteen eiliseen"	2024	1	Kunpa oisin kertonut
"Luotathan" (with Lauri Haav)	2024	1	Kunpa oisin kertonut
"Löytää mut"	2024	1	Kunpa oisin kertonut
"Aja tai kuole" (with Lauri Haav)	2025	1	Non-album single
"Vähän enemmän"	2025	3	Ja nyt mä kerron
"Make Up Your Mind" (with Averagekidluke)	2025	1	Ja nyt mä kerron
"Kaikki viel edessä"	2026	1	Ja nyt mä kerron
"Pidä kii" (with Lauri Haav)	2026	1	Ja nyt mä kerron
"Kansallisaarre" (with Olga)	2026	3	Non-album single
"Liekki"	2026	5	Ja nyt mä kerron
"Alas"	2026	6	Ja nyt mä kerron

=== Other charted songs ===
Title	Year	Peak chart positions	Album
Title	Year	FIN	Album
"Täs mä oon"	2024	2	Kunpa oisin kertonut
"Seireeni"	2024	4	Kunpa oisin kertonut
"Painava sydän"	2024	6	Kunpa oisin kertonut
"Tytöt"	2024	10	Kunpa oisin kertonut
"Tyttö joka itkee iltaisin"	2024	13	Kunpa oisin kertonut
"Pelottaa"	2024	16	Kunpa oisin kertonut
"Pitäkää hauskaa"	2024	17	Kunpa oisin kertonut
"Parkkis"	2024	17	Kunpa oisin kertonut
"Salama"	2024	27	Kunpa oisin kertonut
