= Nessvold =

Nessvold is a surname. Notable people with the surname include:

- Annika Nessvold, Swedish footballer
- Hampus Nessvold, Swedish comedian
