= Noll2 =

Swedish musical duo

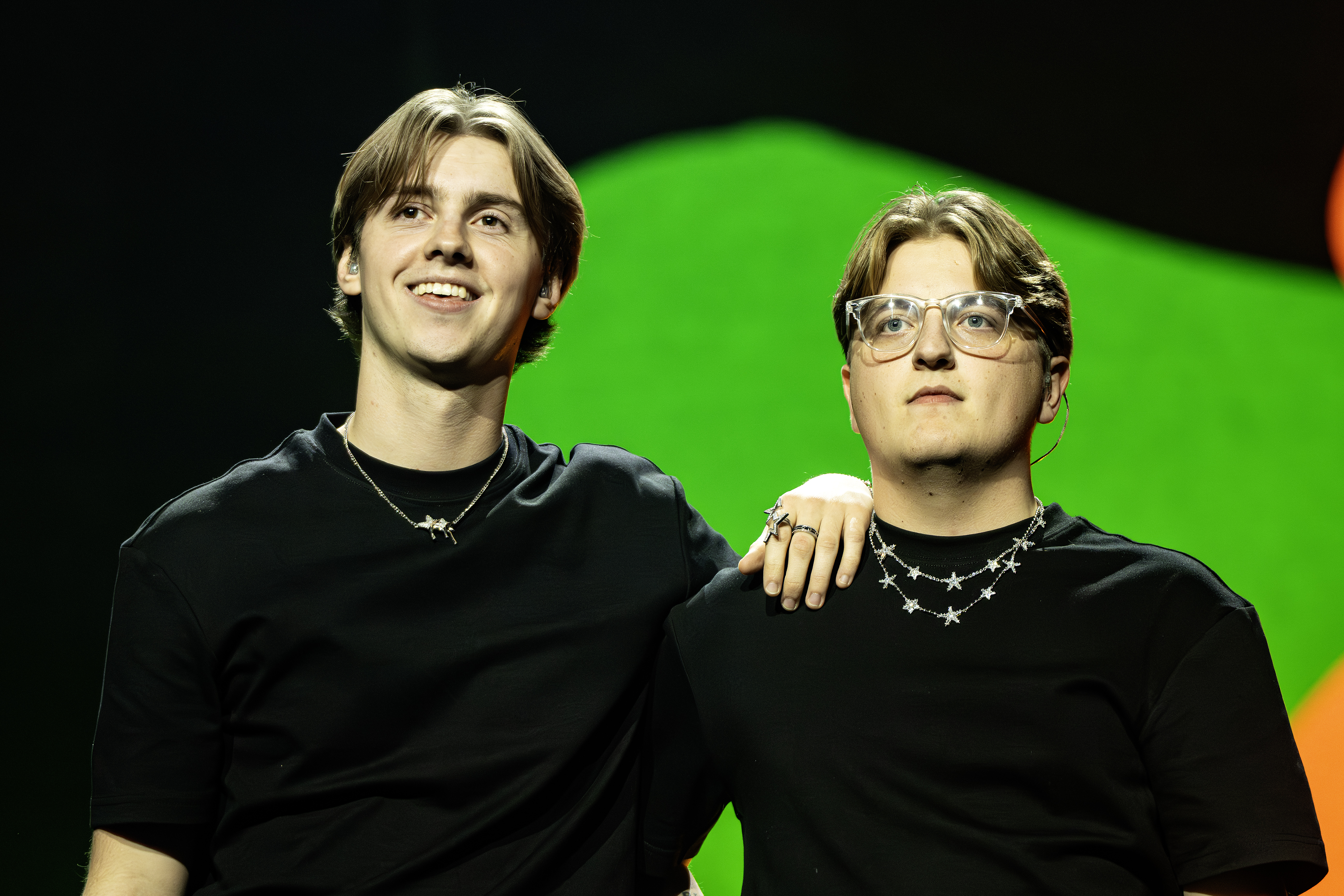
Noll2 in 2026

Noll2 is a Swedish music duo consisting of singers Jakob Westerlund and Wilmer Öberg. They were both born in Örnsköldsvik.

The duo performed their song "Berusade ord" in Melodifestivalen 2026. They placed 5th in the first heat and did not qualify for either the final or the final qualifier. In addition to their own song, they were also credited as songwriters on the song "Ingenting" by Emilia Pantić which also competed in Melodifestivalen 2026.

== Discography ==
=== Singles ===
Title	Year	Peak chart positions	Album
Title	Year	SWE	Album
"Berusade ord"	2026	3	Non-album single
