= Melodifestivalen 2026 =

Swedish music competition

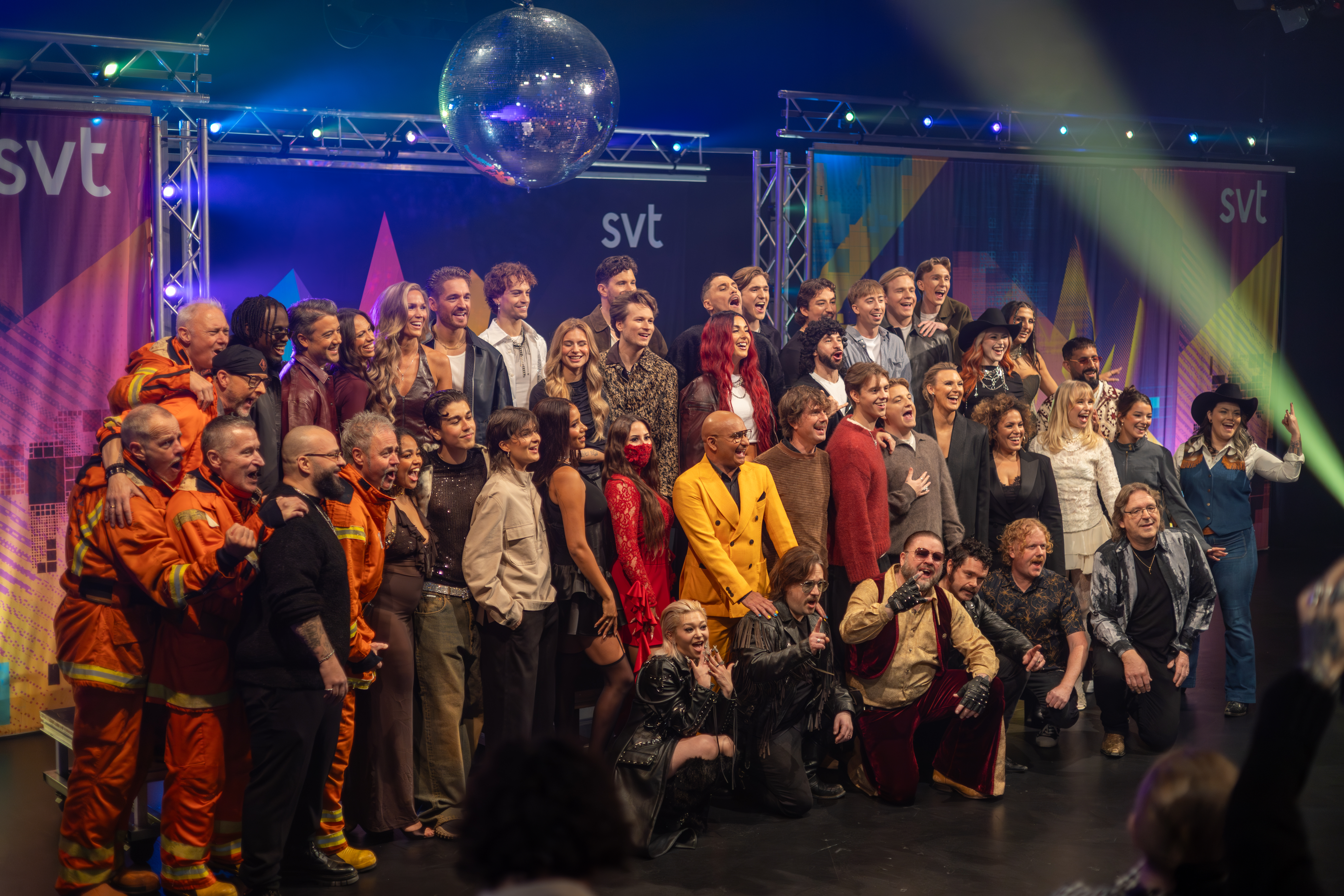

Dates and venues
- Heat 1: 31 January 2026; Saab Arena, Linköping
- Heat 2: 7 February 2026; Scandinavium, Gothenburg
- Heat 3: 14 February 2026; Kristianstad Arena, Kristianstad
- Heat 4: 21 February 2026; Malmö Arena, Malmö
- Heat 5: 28 February 2026; Gärdehov Arena, Sundsvall
- Final: 7 March 2026; Strawberry Arena, Stockholm

Production
- Host broadcaster: Sveriges Television (SVT)
- Director: Fredrik Bäcklund; Robin Hofwander
- Presenters: Gina Dirawi; Hampus Nessvold

Participants
- Number of entries: 30
- Number of finalists: 12

Vote
- Voting system: Heats and final qualification: 100% public vote Final: 50% public vote, 50% jury vote
- Winning song: "My System" by Felicia

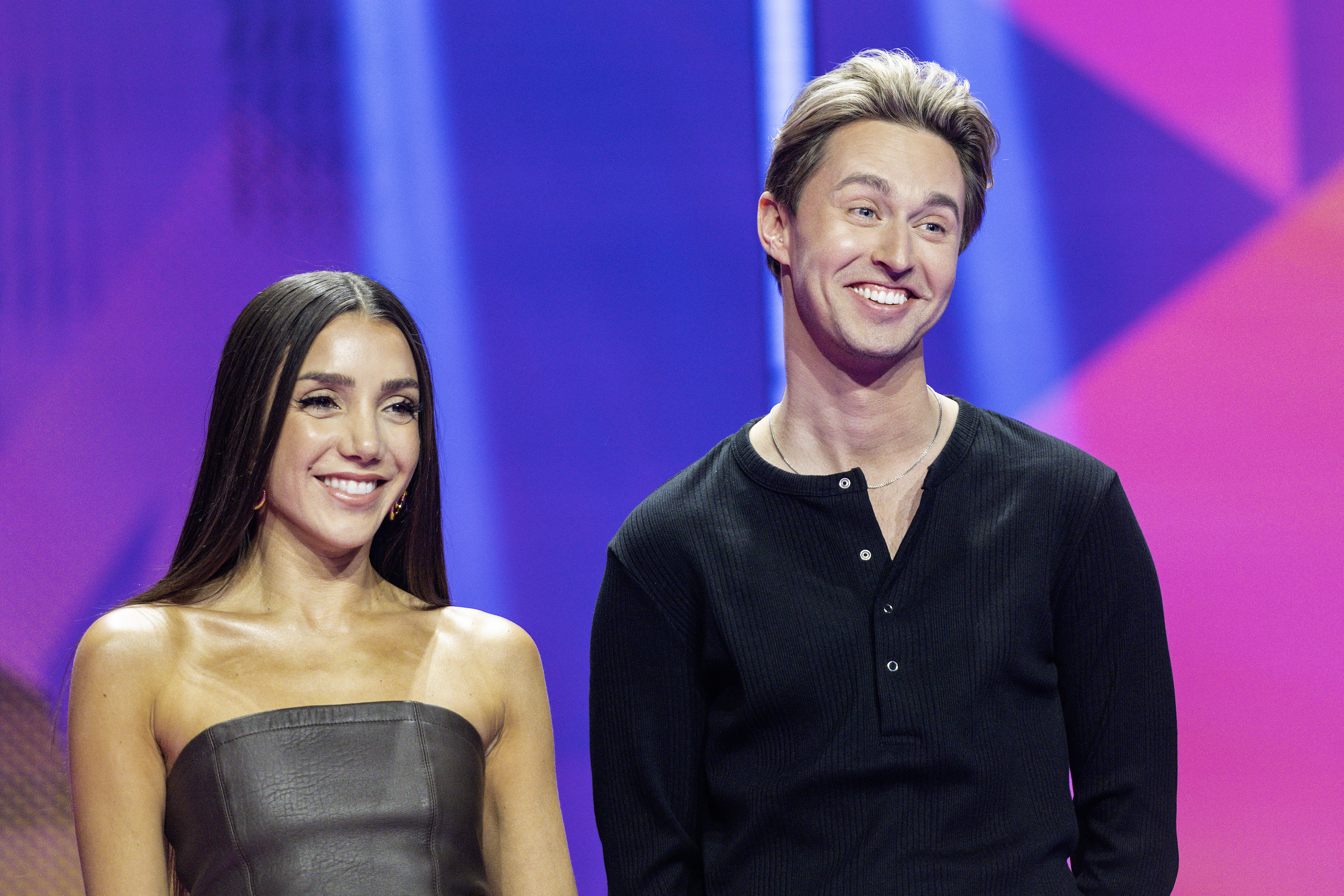
The hosts Gina Dirawi and Hampus Nessvold.

Melodifestivalen 2026 was the 66th edition of the Swedish music competition Melodifestivalen, organised by Sveriges Television (SVT) and took place during a six-week period between 31 January and 7 March 2026, hosted by Gina Dirawi and Hampus Nessvold. The winner of the competition, Felicia with the song "My System", went on to represent Sweden in the Eurovision Song Contest 2026, where she finished in 20th place with 51 points.

== Format ==
Melodifestivalen 2026 had six weekly shows held in six Swedish cities (Linköping, Gothenburg, Kristianstad, Malmö, Sundsvall and Stockholm). Gina Dirawi and Hampus Nessvold were announced as the hosts of the competition on 19 December 2025.

A total of 30 entries took part in the competition across five heats. Each heat consisted of six songs, with the top two songs directly qualifying for the final. In each heat, the first finalist was selected based on the number of public votes received in the first round, while the second round determined the second finalist and the remaining placings through a points-based system of age groups that had been in place since 2019, with a Radiohjälpen voting group replacing the former telephone group as all televoting proceeds were now to be donated to the charity; the full breakdown of the results was presented on-screen, as had been the case between 2022 and 2024. The remaining artist with the highest total number of votes across both rounds then advanced to a final qualification round (rather than the third-placed entry as in the previous edition). The top two songs in the final qualification then progressed to the final, which comprised 12 songs. The winner of the final was determined by a 50/50 combination of votes from the public and an international jury.

Competition schedule
Show	Date	City	Venue
Heat 1	31 January 2026	Linköping	Saab Arena
Heat 2	7 February 2026	Gothenburg	Scandinavium
Heat 3	14 February 2026	Kristianstad	Kristianstad Arena
Heat 4	21 February 2026	Malmö	Malmö Arena
Heat 5	28 February 2026	Sundsvall	Gärdehov Arena
Final	7 March 2026	Stockholm	Strawberry Arena

== Competing entries ==
A public submission window was open between 18 August and 12 September 2025 to select the 30 competing entries. Upon closing the submission period, SVT announced that 3,888 applications had been received, from which competing entries were then selected by a dedicated board chaired by Melodifestivalen producer and artistic director Karin Gunnarsson, both from the received submissions and by direct invitation of artists. The selected entries were announced on 2 December 2025.

Artist	Song	Songwriter(s)
A-Teens	"Iconic"	Dino Medanhodzic, Jimmy Jansson, Lina Hansson, Moa "Cazzi Opeia" Carlebecker, Thomas G:son
AleXa	"Tongue Tied"	Alexaundra Christine Schneiderman, Ellen Berg, Jonatan Gusmark, Ludvig Evers, Moa "Cazzi Opeia" Carlebecker
Arwin	"Glitter"	Arwin Ismail, Axel Schylström, Dino Medanhodzic, Melanie Wehbe, Robert Skowronski
Bladë	"Who You Are"	Isa Tengblad, Josefina Carlbom
Brandsta City Släckers	"Rakt in i elden"	Anderz Wrethov, Elin Wrethov, Kristofer Strandberg, Robert Skowronski
Cimberly	"Eternity"	Cimberly-Malaika Wanyonyi, David Lindgren Zacharias, Dino Medanhodzic, Melanie Wehbe
Emilia Pantić	"Ingenting"	Emilia Pantić, Fredrik Andersson, Jakob Westerlund, Theodor Ström, Wilmer Öberg
Erika Jonsson	"Från landet"	Amir Aly, Erika Jonsson, Mikael Karlsson
Eva Jumatate	"Selfish"	Eva Jumatate, Herman Gardarfve Marlene Strand, Ruth Lindegren
Felicia	"My System"	Audun Agnar Guldbrandsen, Emily Harbakk, Felicia Eriksson, Julie Bergan, Theresa Rex
Felix Manu	"Hatar att jag älskar dig"	Axel Schylström, Felix Manu, Fernand MP, Karl Flyckt
Greczula	"Half of Me"	Andreas Werling, Karl Ivert, Kian Sang, Kristofer Greczula
Indra	"Beautiful Lie"	Anderz Wrethov, Indra Elg, Kristofer Strandberg, Laurell Barker, Robert Skowronski
Jacqline	"Woman"	Dino Medanhodzic, Jimmy Jansson, Moa "Cazzi Opeia" Carlebecker, Thomas G:son
Juliett	"Långt från alla andra"	David Själin, Elias Kask, Herman Gardarfve, Ludvig Alamanos, Romeo Er-Melin, Valter Wigren
Junior Lerin	"Copacabana Boy"	Fredrik Andersson
Klara Almström	"Där hela världen väntar"	Fredrik Sonefors, Jimmy Jansson, Klara Almström
Korslagda	"King of Rock 'n' Roll"	Andreas Werling, Kristofer Strandberg, Pedro Sanchez, Stefan "Ubbe" Sjur
Laila Adèle	"Oxygen"	Jonas Thander, Laila Adèle, Marcus Winther-John
Lilla Al-Fadji	"Delulu"	Daniel Réhn, Edward af Sillén, Fredrik Sonefors, Lilla Al-Fadji, Melanie Wehbe, Mikaela Samuelsson
Medina	"Viva L'Amor"	Ali "Alibrorsh" Jammali, Anderz Wrethov, Dino Medanhodzic, Jimmy "Joker" Thörnfeldt, Sami Rekik
Meira Omar	"Dooset daram" (دوسِت دارَم)	Anderz Wrethov, Jimmy "Joker" Thörnfeldt, Laurell Barker, Meira Omar
Noll2	"Berusade ord"	Fredrik Andersson, Jakob Westerlund, Wilmer Öberg
Patrik Jean	"Dusk Till Dawn"	David Lindgren Zacharias, Joy Deb, Melanie Wehbe, Patrik Jean
Robin Bengtsson	"Honey Honey"	Gavin Jones, Pär Westerlund, Petter Tarland, Robin Bengtsson
Saga Ludvigsson	"Ain't Today"	Dino Medanhodzic, Jimmy Jansson, Johanna "Dotter" Jansson, Saga Ludvigsson
Sanna Nielsen	"Waste Your Love"	Jimmy Jansson, Peter Boström, Thomas G:son
Smash into Pieces	"Hollow"	Benjamin Jennebo, Chris Adam Hedman Sörbye, Per Bergquist, Philip Strand
Timo Räisänen	"Ingenting är efter oss"	Andreas "Giri" Lindbergh, Jimmy "Joker" Thörnfeldt, Joy Deb, Lina Räisänen, Linnea Deb, Timo Räisänen
Vilhelm Buchaus	"Hearts Don't Lie"	David Zandén, Isa Molin, Vilhelm Buchaus

== Contest overview ==
=== Heat 1 ===
The first heat took place on 31 January 2026 at the Saab Arena in Linköping. A total of 10,087,769 votes were cast using 553,145 devices, with SEK 499,751 collected for Radiohjälpen.

For the first time, only the two finalists were announced live on SVT1, while the artist advancing to the final qualification was revealed in a separate broadcast aired immediately afterwards on SVT Play. This format was originally intended to apply to the first four heats, but was abandoned after the first heat following viewer backlash.

R/O	Artist	Song	Round 1		Round 2			Final qual. vote		Result
R/O	Artist	Song	Votes	Place	Votes	Points	Place	Total votes	Place	Result
1	Greczula	"Half of Me"	1,400,783	1	—N/a					Final
2	Jacqline	"Woman"	1,128,848	3	662,532	67	2	1,791,380	1	Final qual.
3	Noll2	"Berusade ord"	1,004,889	4	599,395	49	4	1,604,284	2	Out
4	Junior Lerin	"Copacabana Boy"	937,350	5	577,933	44	5	1,515,283	3	Out
5	Indra	"Beautiful Lie"	880,886	6	536,875	52	3	1,417,761	4	Out
6	A-Teens	"Iconic"	1,351,878	2	1,006,400	92	1	2,358,278	—N/a	Final

Round 2 detailed televoting results
R/O	Song	Age groups							RH
R/O	Song	3‍–‍9	10‍–‍15	16‍–‍29	30‍–‍44	45‍–‍59	60‍–‍74	75+	RH
2	"Woman"	8	8	12	10	10	8	8	3
3	"Berusade ord"	5	5	8	8	5	5	5	8
4	"Copacabana Boy"	10	12	3	5	3	3	3	5
5	"Beautiful Lie"	3	3	5	3	8	10	10	10
6	"Iconic"	12	10	10	12	12	12	12	12

=== Heat 2 ===
The second heat took place on 7 February 2026 at the Scandinavium in Gothenburg. A total of 9,750,011 votes were cast using 565,221 devices, with SEK 495,139 collected for Radiohjälpen.

R/O	Artist	Song	Round 1		Round 2			Final qual. vote		Result
R/O	Artist	Song	Votes	Place	Votes	Points	Place	Total votes	Place	Result
1	Arwin	"Glitter"	897,762	4	429,545	41	5	1,327,307	2	Out
2	Laila Adèle	"Oxygen"	787,028	6	358,676	50	3	1,145,704	4	Out
3	Robin Bengtsson	"Honey Honey"	1,228,105	3	661,509	76	2	1,889,614	1	Final qual.
4	Felicia	"My System"	1,788,115	1	—N/a					Final
5	Klara Almström	"Där hela världen väntar"	803,312	5	377,048	43	4	1,180,360	3	Out
6	Brandsta City Släckers	"Rakt in i elden"	1,457,264	2	961,638	94	1	2,418,902	—N/a	Final

Round 2 detailed televoting results
R/O	Song	Age groups							RH
R/O	Song	3‍–‍9	10‍–‍15	16‍–‍29	30‍–‍44	45‍–‍59	60‍–‍74	75+	RH
1	"Glitter"	8	8	5	8	3	3	3	3
2	"Oxygen"	3	3	3	3	8	12	8	10
3	"Honey Honey"	10	10	10	10	10	8	10	8
5	"Där hela världen väntar"	5	5	8	5	5	5	5	5
6	"Rakt in i elden"	12	12	12	12	12	10	12	12

=== Heat 3 ===
The third heat took place on 14 February 2026 at the Kristianstad Arena in Kristianstad. A total of 8,511,090 votes were cast using 522,498 devices, with SEK 494,962 collected for Radiohjälpen.

R/O	Artist	Song	Round 1		Round 2			Final qual. vote		Result
R/O	Artist	Song	Votes	Place	Votes	Points	Place	Total votes	Place	Result
1	Patrik Jean	"Dusk Till Dawn"	742,610	5	379,343	43	4	1,121,953	3	Out
2	Korslagda	"King of Rock 'n' Roll"	782,598	4	467,686	67	3	1,250,284	2	Out
3	Emilia Pantić	"Ingenting"	599,937	6	246,894	24	5	846,831	4	Out
4	Medina	"Viva L'Amor"	1,593,068	1	—N/a					Final
5	Eva Jumatate	"Selfish"	1,035,506	3	659,398	80	2	1,694,904	1	Final qual.
6	Saga Ludvigsson	"Ain't Today"	1,142,873	2	861,172	90	1	2,004,045	—N/a	Final

Round 2 detailed televoting results
R/O	Song	Age groups							RH
R/O	Song	3‍–‍9	10‍–‍15	16‍–‍29	30‍–‍44	45‍–‍59	60‍–‍74	75+	RH
1	"Dusk Till Dawn"	8	5	5	5	5	5	5	5
2	"King of Rock 'n' Roll"	5	8	8	10	8	8	8	12
3	"Ingenting"	3	3	3	3	3	3	3	3
5	"Selfish"	10	12	12	8	10	10	10	8
6	"Ain't Today"	12	10	10	12	12	12	12	10

=== Heat 4 ===
The fourth heat took place on 21 February 2026 at the Malmö Arena in Malmö. A total of 7,692,104 votes were cast using 500,686 devices, with SEK 410,318 collected for Radiohjälpen.

R/O	Artist	Song	Round 1		Round 2			Final qual. vote		Result
R/O	Artist	Song	Votes	Place	Votes	Points	Place	Total votes	Place	Result
1	Cimberly	"Eternity"	1,055,137	3	582,639	88	1	1,637,776	—N/a	Final
2	Timo Räisänen	"Ingenting är efter oss"	597,964	6	281,541	43	4	879,505	3	Out
3	Meira Omar	"Dooset daram"	1,183,332	2	688,308	76	2	1,871,640	1	Final qual.
4	Felix Manu	"Hatar att jag älskar dig"	617,399	5	255,032	39	5	872,431	4	Out
5	Erika Jonsson	"Från landet"	676,432	4	309,338	58	3	985,770	2	Out
6	Smash into Pieces	"Hollow"	1,444,980	1	—N/a					Final

Round 2 detailed televoting results
R/O	Song	Age groups							RH
R/O	Song	3‍–‍9	10‍–‍15	16‍–‍29	30‍–‍44	45‍–‍59	60‍–‍74	75+	RH
1	"Eternity"	10	10	12	10	12	12	10	12
2	"Ingenting är efter oss"	3	3	3	5	8	5	8	8
3	"Dooset daram"	12	12	10	12	10	10	5	5
4	"Hatar att jag älskar dig"	8	8	8	3	3	3	3	3
5	"Från landet"	5	5	5	8	5	8	12	10

=== Heat 5 ===
The fifth heat took place on 28 February 2026 at the Gärdehov Arena in Sundsvall. A total of 7,762,440 votes were cast using 489,937 devices, with SEK 735,542 collected for Radiohjälpen.

R/O	Artist	Song	Round 1		Round 2			Final qual. vote		Result
R/O	Artist	Song	Votes	Place	Votes	Points	Place	Total votes	Place	Result
1	AleXa	"Tongue Tied"	882,872	4	513,491	55	4	1,396,363	1	Final qual.
2	Juliett	"Långt från alla andra"	874,697	5	478,131	67	3	1,352,828	3	Out
3	Bladë	"Who You Are"	658,134	6	295,431	30	5	953,565	4	Out
4	Lilla Al-Fadji	"Delulu"	1,099,787	1	—N/a					Final
5	Vilhelm Buchaus	"Hearts Don't Lie"	883,063	3	495,958	68	2	1,379,021	2	Out
6	Sanna Nielsen	"Waste Your Love"	958,236	2	622,640	84	1	1,580,876	—N/a	Final

Round 2 detailed televoting results
R/O	Song	Age groups							RH
R/O	Song	3‍–‍9	10‍–‍15	16‍–‍29	30‍–‍44	45‍–‍59	60‍–‍74	75+	RH
1	"Tongue Tied"	12	12	5	10	5	3	3	5
2	"Långt från alla andra"	10	10	10	5	8	8	8	8
3	"Who You Are"	5	3	3	3	3	5	5	3
5	"Hearts Don't Lie"	3	5	12	8	10	10	10	10
6	"Waste Your Love"	8	8	8	12	12	12	12	12

==== Final qualification ====
At the end of the fifth heat, a final qualification round took place, consisting of the most-voted non-qualifying song from each heat. The two most voted songs qualified for the final; the age group system was not used for this vote, but the results from the heats were added to it to determine the result of the final qualification. More specifically, for the heat points, the total number of votes (excluding votes from Radiohjälpen voting group) for each song in each show were divided by the total number of voters (devices) in each show. Then 1,000 points were distributed amongst the songs based on those ratios. The song with the most points immediately advanced to the final. Once the voting has ended, an additional 800 points were distributed amongst the four remaining entries, based on how viewers have voted during the final qualification round. A total of 2,568,015 votes were cast using 366,012 devices, with SEK 235,965 collected for Radiohjälpen.

Code	Artist	Song	Heat		Final qual.		Total	Place	Result
Code	Artist	Song	Points	Place	Votes	Points	Total	Place	Result
11	Jacqline	"Woman"	197	4	602,236	188	385	3	Out
12	Robin Bengtsson	"Honey Honey"	204	2	746,243	233	437	1	Final
13	Eva Jumatate	"Selfish"	198	3	673,944	210	408	2	Out
14	Meira Omar	"Dooset daram"	227	1	—N/a				Final
15	AleXa	"Tongue Tied"	174	5	545,592	169	343	4	Out

=== Final ===
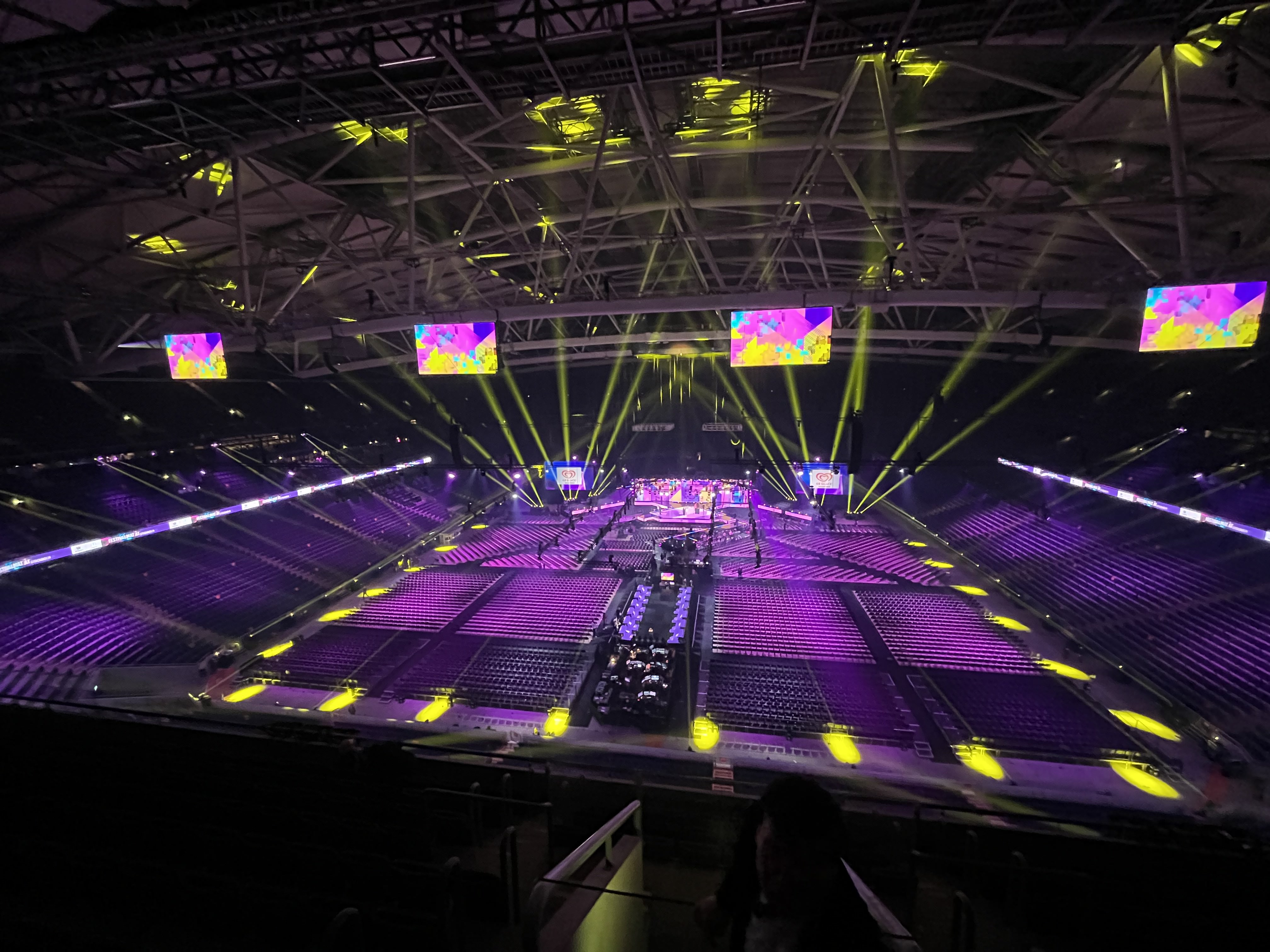
Interior of the Strawberry Arena on the day of the final.

The final took place on 7 March 2026 at the Strawberry Arena in Stockholm. A total of 24,063,713 votes were cast using 962,495 devices, with SEK 1,912,546 collected for Radiohjälpen. SVT Play also provided a stream of the final with English commentary by William Lee Adams and Bella Qvist.

R/O	Artist	Song	Juries	Public	Total	Place
1	A-Teens	"Iconic"	31	36	67	7
2	Meira Omar	"Dooset daram"	33	8	41	9
3	Lilla Al-Fadji	"Delulu"	24	39	63	8
4	Saga Ludvigsson	"Ain't Today"	5	13	18	12
5	Smash into Pieces	"Hollow"	49	41	90	4
6	Cimberly	"Eternity"	48	30	78	6
7	Medina	"Viva L'Amor"	66	66	132	3
8	Greczula	"Half of Me"	64	70	134	2
9	Robin Bengtsson	"Honey Honey"	22	7	29	11
10	Felicia	"My System"	71	90	161	1
11	Sanna Nielsen	"Waste Your Love"	17	16	33	10
12	Brandsta City Släckers	"Rakt in i elden"	34	48	82	5

Detailed international jury votes
R/O	Song	Armenia	Italy	Croatia	France	Czechia	Australia	Greece	Finland	Total
R/O	Song	Armenia	Italy	Croatia	France	Czech Republic	Australia	Greece	Finland	Total
1	"Iconic"	3		8		5	7	2	6	31
2	"Dooset daram"	8	1	2	4	3		7	8	33
3	"Delulu"		6	7	6	1	3		1	24
4	"Ain't Today"		4					1		5
5	"Hollow"	2	7	6	8	6	6	4	10	49
6	"Eternity"	1	8	3	7	8	10	6	5	48
7	"Viva L'Amor"	5	12	10	5	7	12	12	3	66
8	"Half of Me"	12	5	5	12	10	5	8	7	64
9	"Honey Honey"	10	3		3	2	1	3		22
10	"My System"	7		12	10	12	8	10	12	71
11	"Waste Your Love"	6	2	1	2		2		4	17
12	"Rakt in i elden"	4	10	4	1	4	4	5	2	34
International jury spokespersons
Armenia – David Tserunyan; Croatia – Zlata Mück Sušec; Italy – Mariangela Borneo; France – Alexandra Redde-Amiel; Czechia – Dominika Hašková; Australia – Ashley Doodkorte; Greece – Helena Paparizou; Finland – Jaakko Oleander-Turja

Detailed televoting results
R/O	Song	Votes	Age groups							RH	Total
R/O	Song	Votes	3‍–‍9	10‍–‍15	16‍–‍29	30‍–‍44	45‍–‍59	60‍–‍74	75+	RH	Total
1	"Iconic"	1,956,831	5	5	3	4	7	5	5	2	36
2	"Dooset daram"	1,297,916	3	2	1	2					8
3	"Delulu"	2,352,049	10	10	6	7	3			3	39
4	"Ain't Today"	1,434,868	4	3	2	1	1	1	1		13
5	"Hollow"	2,031,417	7	4	4	6	6	6	2	6	41
6	"Eternity"	1,566,592		1	5	3	5	7	4	5	30
7	"Viva L'Amor"	2,565,638	8	8	10	10	8	8	6	8	66
8	"Half of Me"	2,559,709	2	6	8	8	10	12	12	12	70
9	"Honey Honey"	1,209,855	1					2	3	1	7
10	"My System"	3,961,954	12	12	12	12	12	10	10	10	90
11	"Waste Your Love"	1,000,086					2	3	7	4	16
12	"Rakt in i elden"	2,126,798	6	7	7	5	4	4	8	7	48
