= Hollow (Smash into Pieces song) =

Single by Smash into Pieces
- Released: 21 February 2026
- Length: 2:56
- Songwriters: Philip Strand; Per Bergquist; Chris Adam; Benjamin Jennebo

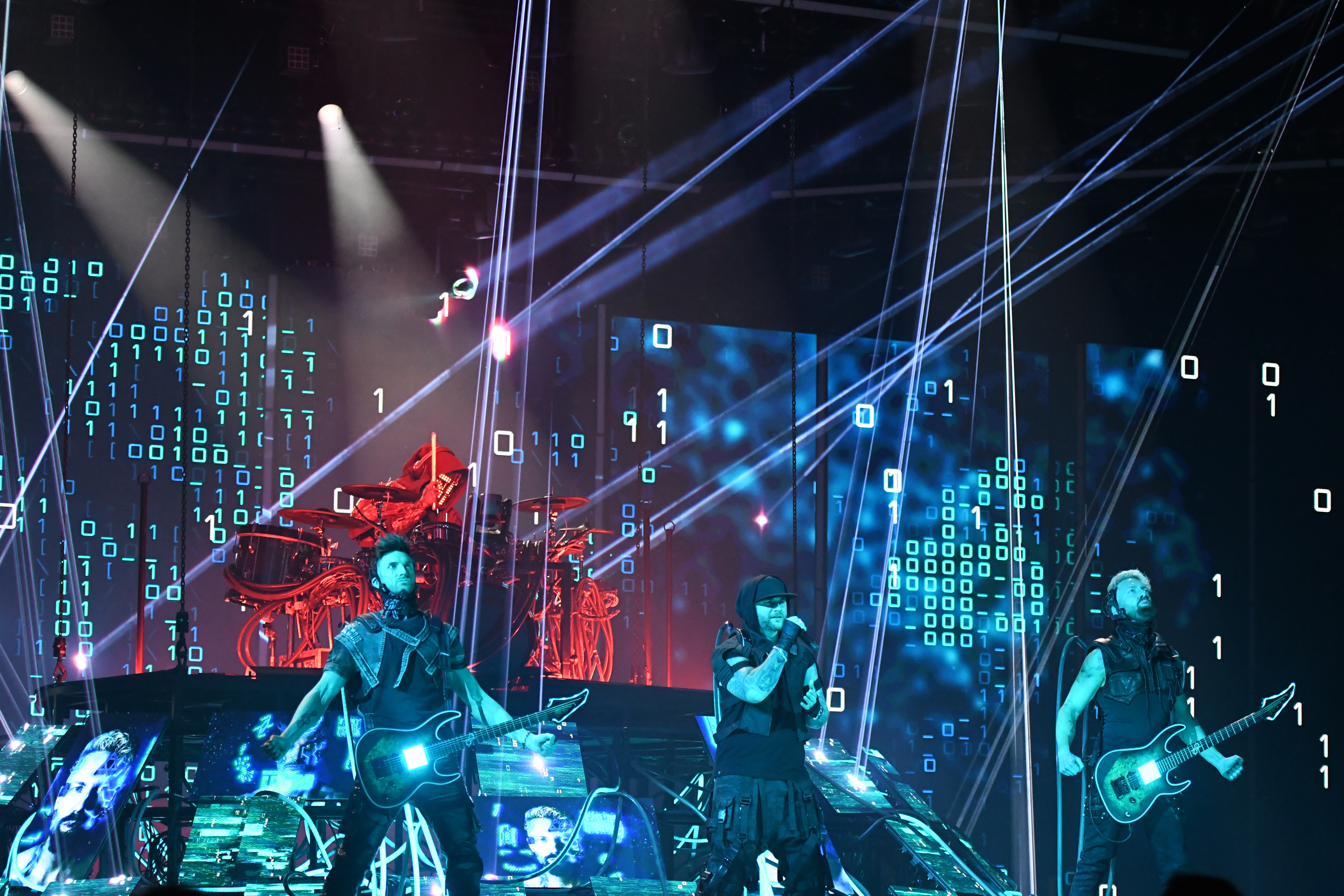
The song performed during the rehearsals for the Melodifestivalen final.

"Hollow" is a song by Swedish rock band Smash into Pieces, released as a single on 21 February 2026. The song was performed in Melodifestivalen 2026. It qualified to the Final.

== Charts ==
Chart performance for "Hollow"
| Chart (2026) | Peak position |
|---|---|
| Sweden (Sverigetopplistan) | 5 |
