= Honey Honey (Robin Bengtsson song) =

Single by Robin Bengtsson

from the EP Honey Honey
- Released: 7 February 2026
- Length: 2:59
- Label: Freebird Entertainment AB; ADA Nordic
- Songwriters: Gavin Jones; Pär Westerlund; Petter Tarland; Robin Bengtsson

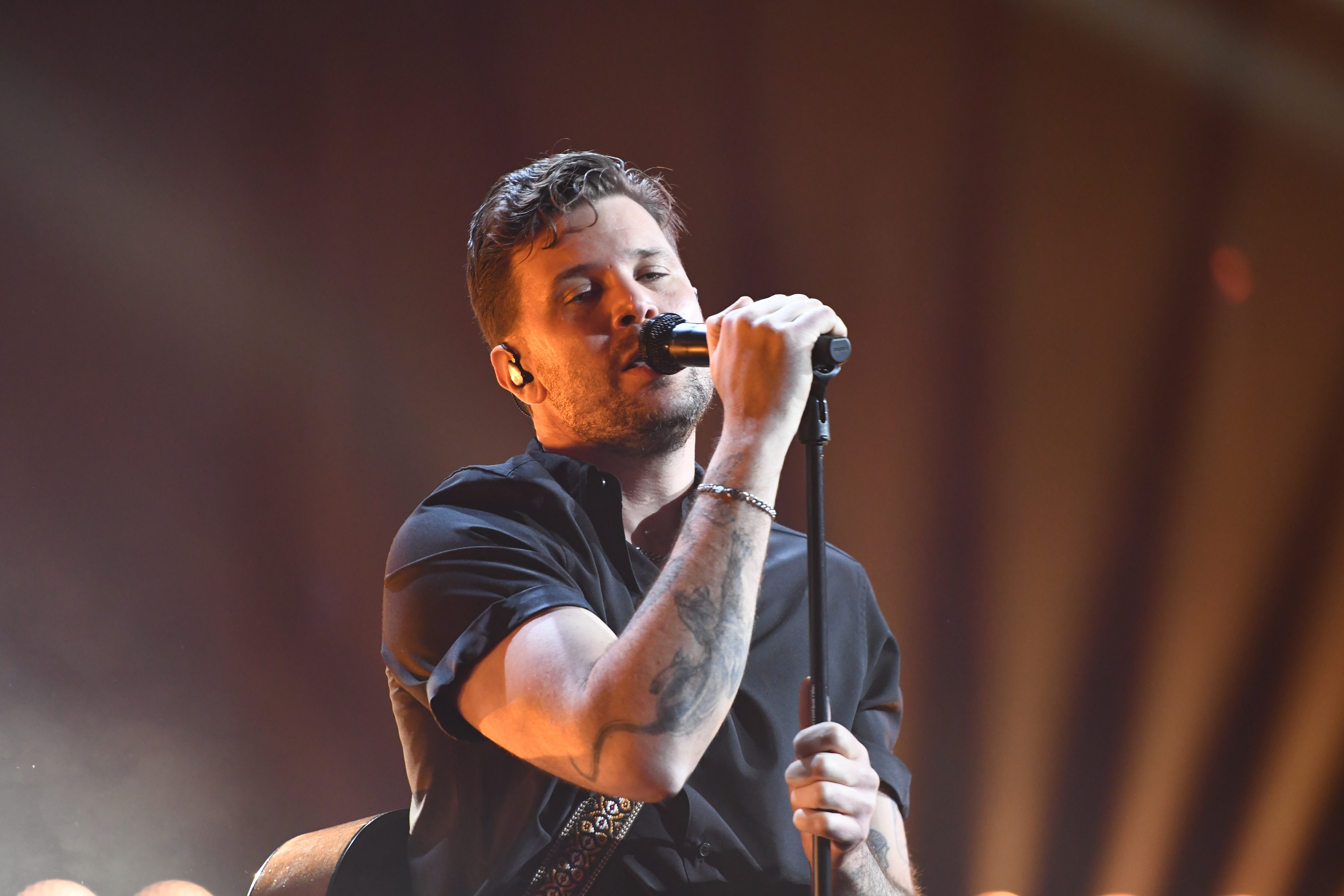
The song performed during the rehearsals for the Melodifestivalen final.

"Honey Honey" is a song by Swedish singer Robin Bengtsson, released as a single on 7 February 2026. The song was performed in Melodifestivalen 2026. It qualified for the Final qualification round. It also qualified for the Final. In the final it came 11th place.

== Charts ==
Chart performance for "Honey Honey"
Chart (2026)	Peak position
Sweden (Sverigetopplistan)	15
