= Korslagda =

Swedish rock band

Korslagda, previously known as Korslagda kukar, is a Swedish rock band established in Älvdalen. The band participated in Melodifestivalen 2026 with the song "King of Rock 'n' Roll", which placed fourth in Heat 3 and failed to qualify for the final.

== Discography ==
=== Album ===
Title	Year	Peak chart positions
Title	Year	SWE
Boulder Dash	2025	36

=== Singles ===
Title	Year	Peak chart positions	Album
Title	Year	SWE	Album
"King of Rock 'n' Roll"	2026	25	Non-album singles
"Är det här det är party"	2026	12	Non-album singles
