= Ain't Today =

Single by Saga Ludvigsson
- Released: 14 February 2026
- Length: 2:40
- Label: Universal Music AB
- Songwriters: Dino Medanhodzic; Jimmy Jansson; Johanna "Dotter" Jansson; Saga Ludvigsson

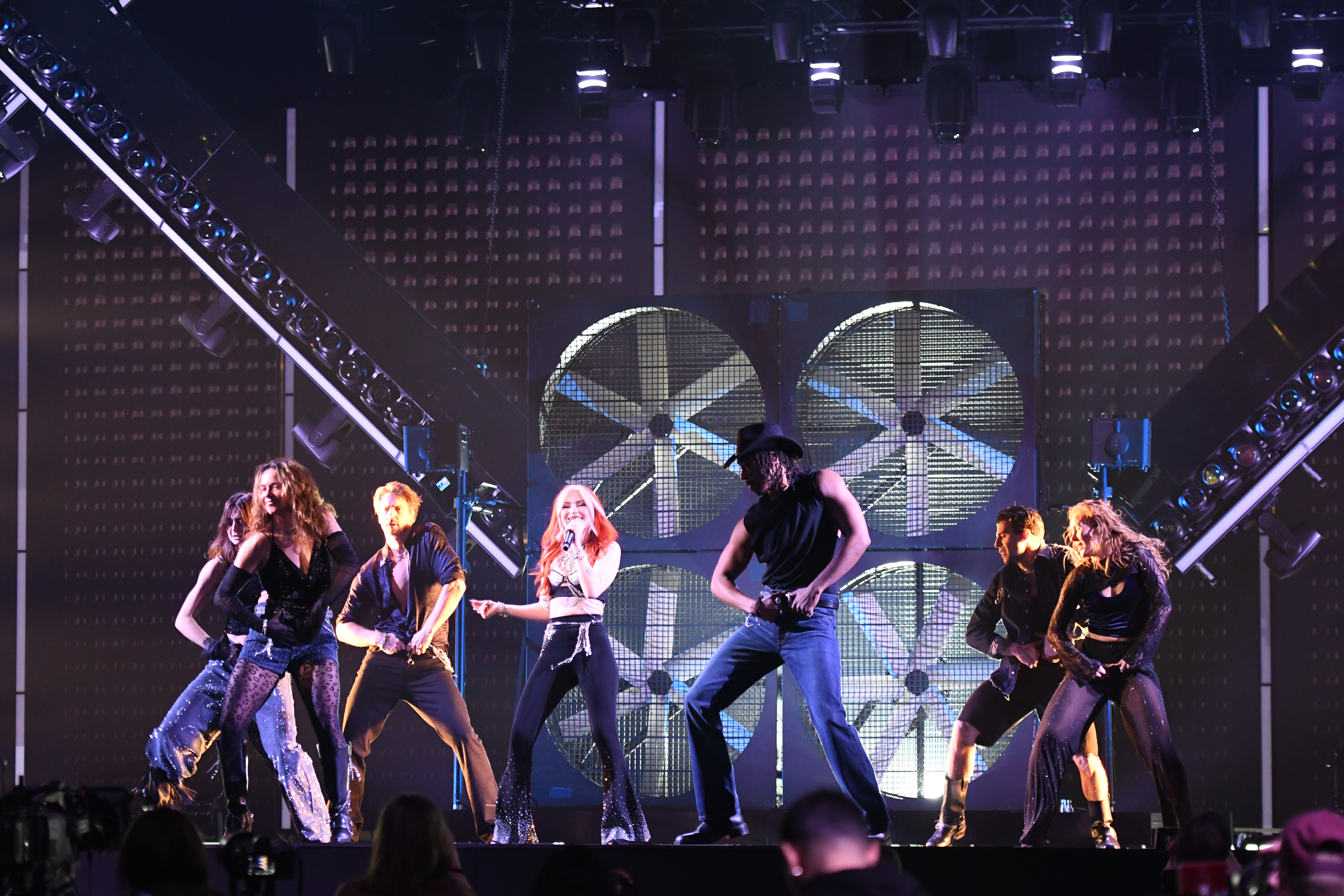
The song performed during the rehearsals for the Melodifestivalen final.

"Ain't Today" is a song by Swedish singer Saga Ludvigsson, released as a single on 14 February 2026. The song was performed in Melodifestivalen 2026. It qualified for the final.

== Charts ==
Chart performance for "Ain't Today"
Chart (2026)	Peak position
Sweden (Sverigetopplistan)	6
