= Timo Räisänen =

Swedish musician (born 1979)

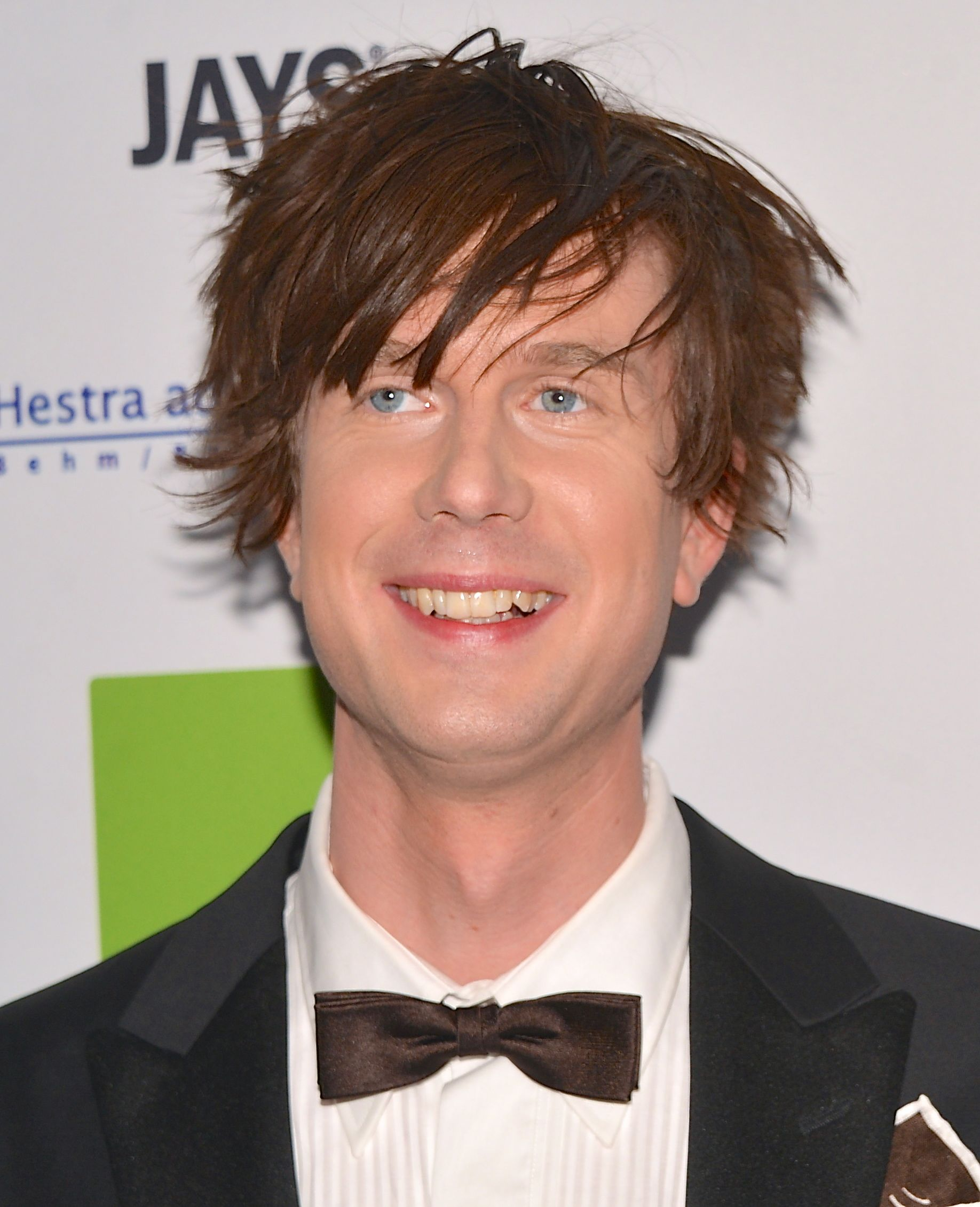
- Räisänen in 2013

Background information
- Born: Timo Räisänen; 25 July 1979 (age 46)
- Origin: Gothenburg, Sweden
- Genres: Rock, indie pop, pop
- Occupation: Musician
- Instrument: Vocal
- Years active: 2004–present
- Formerly of: Her Majesty
- Website: timoraisanen.com

Timo Räisänen (born 25 July 1979) is a Swedish musician. He has been part of Håkan Hellström's band, and has also played in the band Her Majesty. In 2004, he started his solo career.

== Early life ==
Räisänen was born in Gothenburg, Sweden. His mother tongue is English. His mother was born in India, the daughter of an Anglo-Indian mother and a Swedish father. His father was born in Finland to Finnish parents and raised in Brazil. His parents had met in Sweden, where they also started a family. The title of his 2006 album, I'm Indian refers to his mother's ancestry.

== Career ==
In 2007, Räisänen received the P3 Guld award, where he was named best male artist of 2007.

In 2008, Räisänen received another P3 Guld award, where he was named best live artist of 2008.

Räisänen frequently features songs written by other artists on the B-side of his singles. In 2008, he released an album titled ...And Then There Was Timo consisting of a handful of newly recorded covers.

In 2009, he sang live along with In Flames, on their song "Alias". Räisänen has also made his own acoustic cover version of In Flames' "The Mirror's Truth".

Räisänen performed on the National Day of Sweden in 2009 and in the celebration LOVE Stockholm 2010 which was dedicated to Crown Princess Victoria's marriage to Prince Daniel.

In 2016, his friend Martin Schaub suggested Räisänen make a record of 70's late folk-pop artist Ted Gärdestad covers. Räisänen at first thought his friend had gone mad, but eventually made the record, to much success and he claims it made him start writing songs in Swedish. The following year, he released "Tro, Hat, Stöld" (Faith, Hate, Theft), an album consisting of songs in the Swedish language. Both albums resulted in large successful Swedish tours.

He participated in Melodifestivalen 2026 with the song "Ingenting är efter oss".

== Discography ==
=== Albums ===
- 2005 - Lovers Are Lonely #22 SWE
- 2006 - I'm Indian #17 SWE
- 2007 - Love Will Turn You Around #3 SWE
- 2008 - ...And Then There Was Timo #13 SWE
- 2010 - The Anatomy of Timo Räisänen #5 SWE
- 2012 - Endeavor
- 2016 - Timo sjunger Ted
- 2017 - Tro, hat, stöld

=== Singles ===
- 2004 - "Lovers Are Lonely"
- 2005 - "Don't Let the Devil Ruin it All"
- 2005 - "Pussycat"
- 2006 - "Let's Kill Ourselves a Son"
- 2007 - "Sweet Marie"
- 2007 - "My Valentine"
- 2008 - "Sixteen"
- 2008 - "Spill Your Beans" (download only)
- 2008 - "About You Now"
- 2009 - "Creep"
- 2010 - "Numbers"
- 2010 - "Outcast"
- 2010 - "Hollow Heart"
- 2012 - "Second Cut"

=== Charting singles ===
Title	Year	Peak chart positions	Album
Title	Year	SWE	Album
"Fear No Darkness, Promised Child"	2006	15	Non-album singles
"Ingenting är efter oss"	2026	48	Non-album singles
