= Viva L'Amor =

Single by Medina
- Released: 14 February 2026
- Length: 3:01
- Label: Warner Music Sweden AB
- Songwriters: Ali Jammali; Dino Medanhodzic; Sami Rekik; Jimmy "Joker" Thörnfeldt; Anderz Wrethov

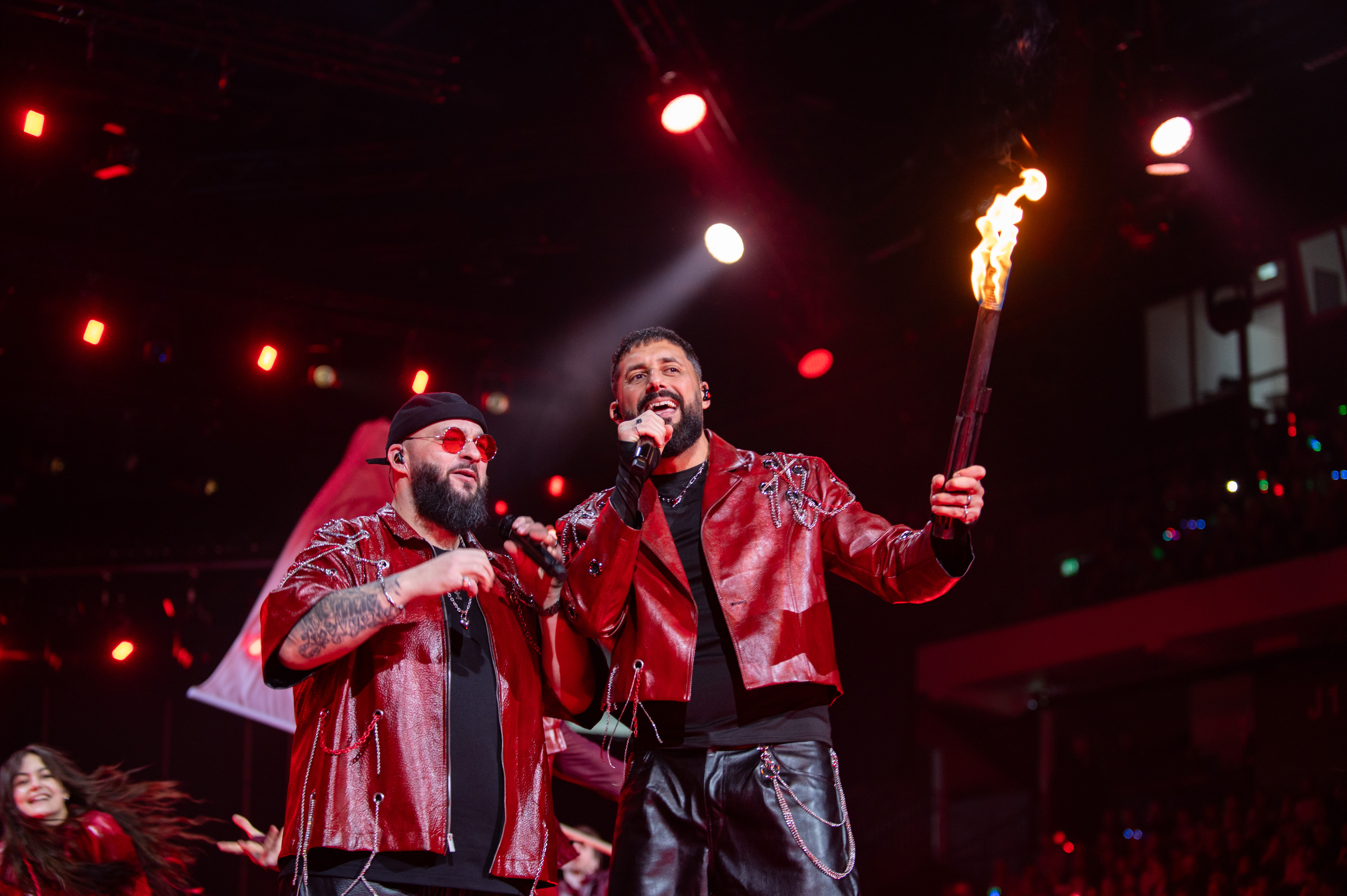
The song performed during the rehearsals for the Melodifestivalen third qualifier round.

"Viva L'Amor" is a song by Swedish duo Medina, released as a single on 14 February 2026. The song was performed in Melodifestivalen 2026. It qualified for the final.

== Charts ==
Chart performance for "Viva L'Amor"
Chart (2026)	Peak position
Sweden (Sverigetopplistan)	2

== Certifications ==
Certifications for "Viva L'Amor"
Region	Certification	Certified units/sales
Streaming
Sweden (GLF)	Gold	6,000,000^{†}
^{†} Streaming-only figures based on certification alone.
