= Eternity (Cimberly song) =

Single by Cimberly
- Released: 21 February 2026
- Length: 2:47
- Label: Universal Music AB
- Songwriters: Cimberly-Malaika Wanyonyi; David Lindgren Zacharias; Dino Medanhodzic; Melanie Wehbe

Cimberly singles chronology
"Honor" (2025)	"Eternity" (2026)

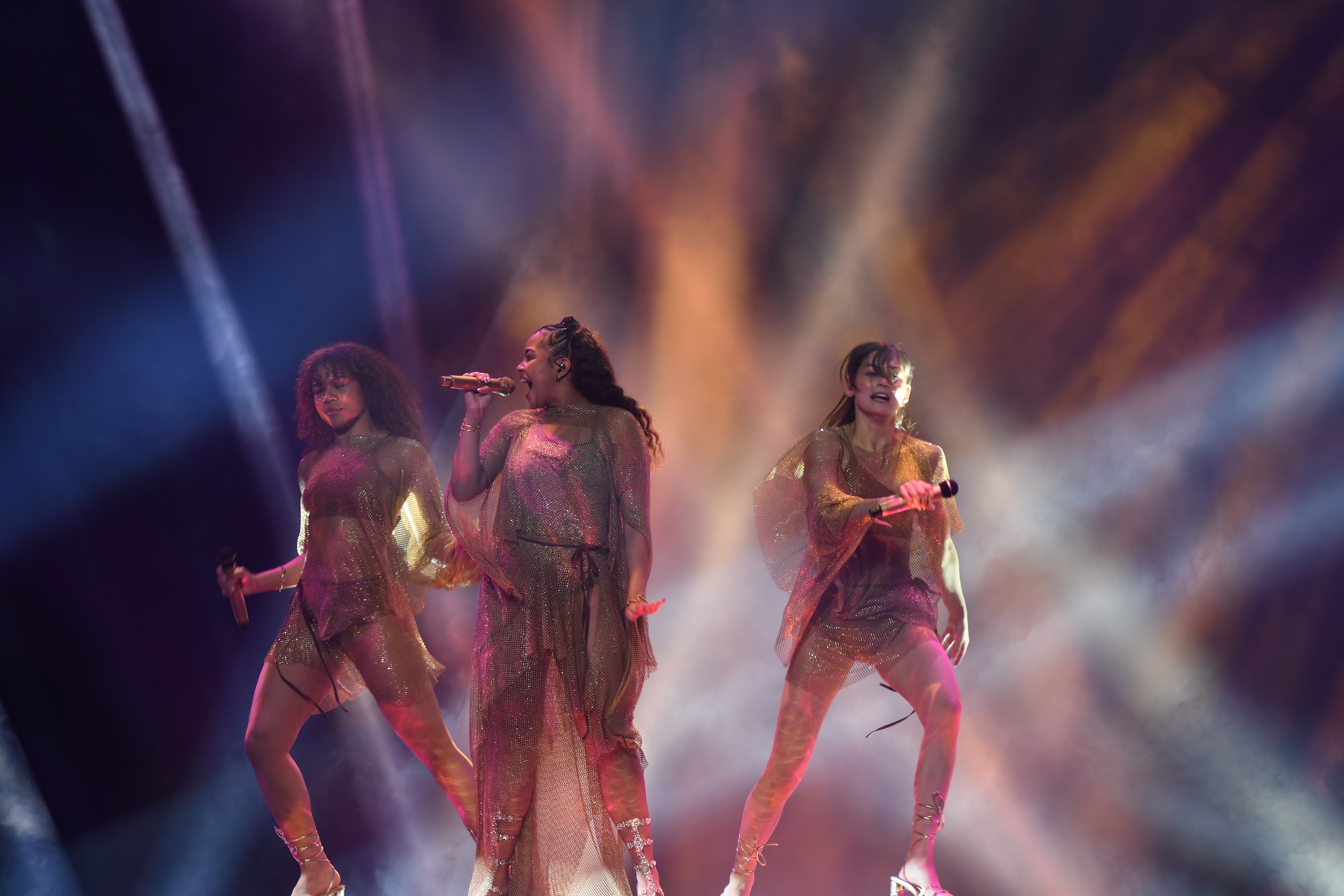
The song performed during the rehearsals for the Melodifestivalen final.

"Eternity" is a song by Swedish singer Cimberly, released as a single on 21 February 2026. The song was performed in Melodifestivalen 2026. It qualified to the Final.

== Charts ==
Chart performance for "Eternity"
Chart (2026)	Peak position
Sweden (Sverigetopplistan)	13
Sweden Airplay (Radiomonitor)	5
