= Kom och ta mig =

Single by Brandsta City Släckers

from the album Rök'n'Roll
- B-side: "Oh, Susie 1979"
- Released: 2002
- Genre: Pop; rock
- Label: Start klart
- Songwriters: Larry Forsberg; Sven-Inge Sjöberg; Lennart Wastesson

"Kom och ta mig", written by Larry Forsberg, Sven-Inge Sjöberg and Lennart Wastesson, is a song performed by the Brandsta City Släckers at Melodifestivalen 2002, ending up 5th. The song's lyrics describe the process of urbanization from the perspectives of rural districts.

The single peaked at number 4 on the Swedish singles chart, and was also at the Brandsta City Släckers album Rök 'n' Roll.

The song stayed at Svensktoppen for a total of 40 weeks until 14 December 2002, and was the Melodifestivalen song charting for the longest time until the record was broken by the Sanna Nielsen song Empty Room on 25 January 2009.

Staying at Svensktoppen throughout the rest of the year, the song became the chart's most successful song of 2002 and was never knocked out the traditional way. Instead, all remaining songs from the previous program was removed when the chart was re-organized on 12 January 2003.

== Charts ==
=== Weekly charts ===
Chart (2002)	Peak position
Sweden (Sverigetopplistan)	4

=== Year-end charts ===
Chart (2002)	Position
Sweden (Sverigetopplistan)	26
