= Joakim Lundell =

Swedish YouTuber and media personality (born 1985)

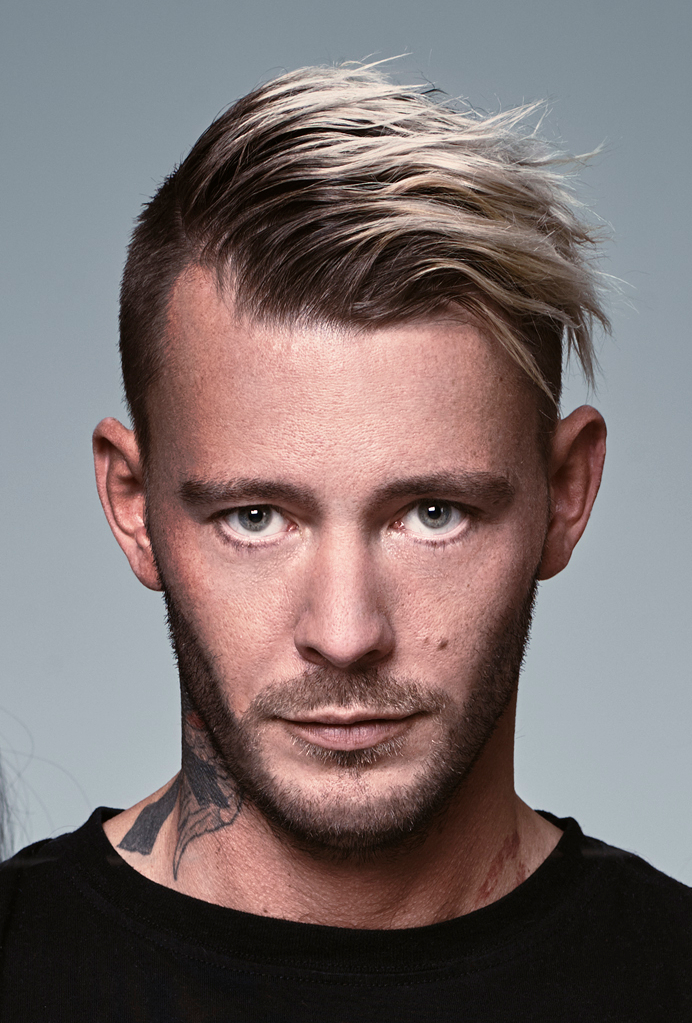
- Lundell in 2017
- Born: Joakim Alexander Karlsson; 9 October 1985 (age 40); Vadstena, Östergötland County, Sweden
- Other name: Jockiboi
- Occupations: YouTuber; media personality; reality contestant; musician; author; film producer
- Spouse: Jonna Lundell (m. 2016)
- Children: 3

YouTube information
- Channels: Jocke & Jonna; Lundell Pranks; Joakim Lundell
- Years active: 2010–present
- Genres: Vlogs; pranks; challenges
- Subscribers: 1.7 million (combined)
- Views: 954 million (combined)
- Last updated: 19 December 2020

Joakim Alexander Lundell (unmarried Berg, né Karlsson; born 9 October 1985), also known as Jockiboi, is a Swedish YouTuber, media personality and musician.

== Career ==
Lundell became known in Sweden after participating in the Kanal 5 reality series Kungarna av Tylösand in 2010. He then went on to start an infamous blog centered around the concept of "dagens runk" ("masturbation of the day"), wherein he uploaded daily photographs of himself masturbating in different ways. He remained a controversial figure in Swedish media for many years, blogging about pornography and releasing sex tapes. He released a sex tape with Jonna Lundell in 2013, which he claims was leaked by accident.

He has won several "Guldtuben" awards for his work on YouTube and with his blog, In 2015 he won the "Star of the year" award and in 2016 he won the "Hidden camera of the year" award at the same gala. Lundell's wedding was the subject of a reality TV-series called Jocke och Jonna i nöd och lust, broadcast on TV3-Play and TV3, that showed the couple's preparations for their wedding. In 2017, the Lundells appeared in their own reality series called Jocke och Jonna möter which was broadcast on Viafree. In 2017, Lundell published his autobiography, entitled Monster. In 2018, he released the music single "Hazardous" along with Lazee, which peaked at number five on the Swedish Singles Chart. In 2018, he also released his first album, Feelings. On 14 February 2020, Lundell released the single "Under Water" with Swedish singer-songwriter "Dotter". A music video for the song was released on 13 February 2020.

In 2020, he entered Big Brother Sverige on Day 22. According to Swedish newspaper Aftonbladet, Lundell's entry was "just a prank" and he left the show on 4 March 2020.

Through "Scandinavian Content Group" Lundell has produced three horror films, Feed in 2022, Carousel and Canceled both in 2023.

== Personal life ==
Lundell met his wife Jonna Lundell in 2013. They got married in 2016, and he took her last name. Lundell has been diagnosed with Asperger syndrome and attention deficit hyperactivity disorder. Two of his brothers, Christofer Berg and Jakob Berg, are also YouTubers.

Lundell has three children.

== Discography ==
=== Albums ===
Title	Details	Peak chart positions
Title	Details	SWE
Feelings	Released: 6 July 2018; Label: Universal; Formats: Digital download, streaming	20

=== Singles ===
Title	Year	Peak chart positions	Album
Title	Year	SWE	Album
"All I Need" (featuring Arrhult)	2017	1	Feelings
"My Addiction" (featuring Arrhult)	2017	2	Feelings
"Waiting For"	2017	3	Feelings
"Monster" (featuring Arrhult and Hector)	2017	5	Feelings
"Only Human" (featuring Sophie Elise)	2017	5	Feelings
"Hazardous" (featuring Lazee and Miinou)	2018	5	Feelings
"All Falls Down"	2018	48	Feelings
"Thank God for the Weeknd"(featuring Klara Almström)	2018	75	Feelings
"Made for You"	2018	94	Feelings
"Grow" (featuring Tom Noah)	2018	— (Note: "Grow" did not enter the Swedish Singellista Chart, but peaked at number 10 on the Swedish Heatseeker Chart.)	Feelings
"What Are We Doing"	2018	86	Feelings
"Under Water" (featuring Dotter)	2020	—	
"I Don't Need Your Love" (with Black Gryph0n)	2020	—	
"—" denotes a release that did not chart or was not released in that territory.
