= Delulu (song) =

Single by Lilla Al-Fadji
- Released: 28 February 2026
- Length: 2:53
- Label: Universal Music AB
- Songwriters: Daniel Réhn; Edward af Sillén; Fredrik Sonefors; Lilla Al-Fadji; Melanie Wehbe; Mikaela Samuelsson

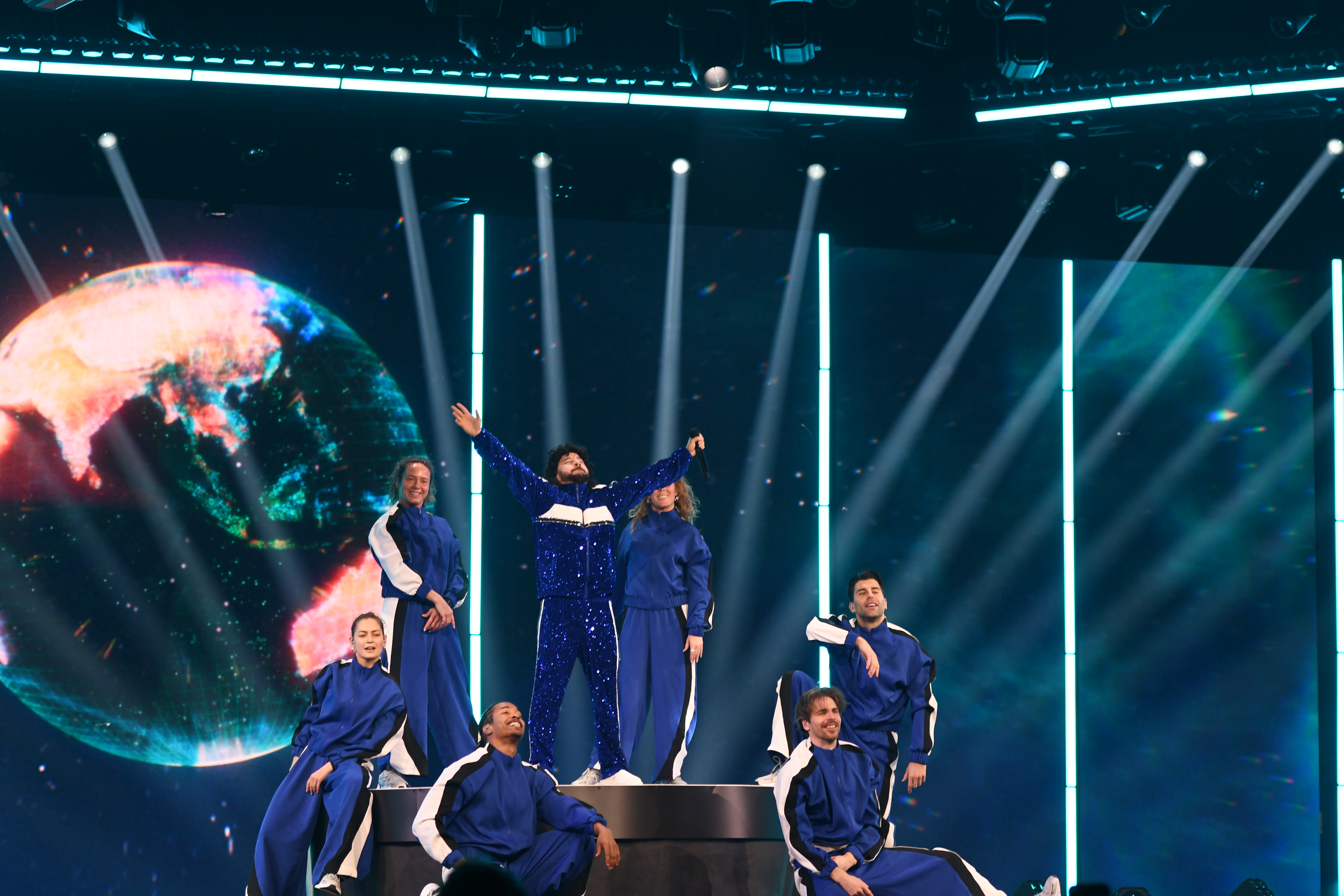
The song performed during the rehearsals for the Melodifestivalen final.

"Delulu" is a Swedish-language song by Swedish singer Lilla Al-Fadji, released as a single on 28 February 2026. The song was performed in Melodifestivalen 2026. It qualified for the final.

== Charts ==
Chart performance for "Delulu"
Chart (2026)	Peak position
Sweden (Sverigetopplistan)	2
