= Brandsta City Släckers =

Swedish band

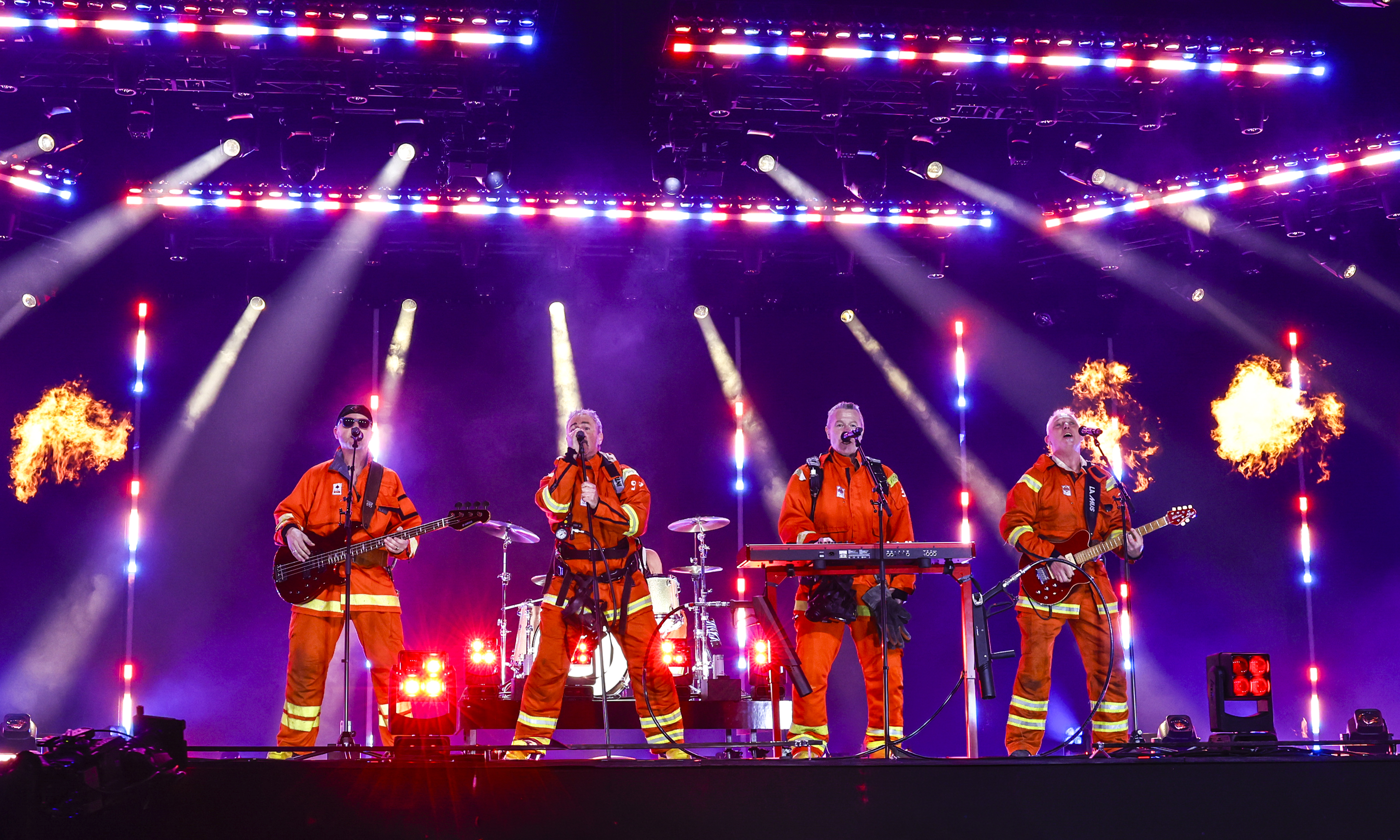
Brandsta City Släckers on stage, 2026

Brandsta City Släckers is a Swedish band composed mostly of firefighters.

The band sang "Kom och ta mig" in Melodifestivalen 2002 and they also performed in Melodifestivalen 2003 with "15 minuter". The group members usually work as firefighters and perform dressed as such. They also received the third highest vote from the televoting audience in Melodifestivalen 2002.

Leadsinger Glenn Borgkvist participated in Melodifestivalen 2004 in a duet with Lotta Nilsson, and presented the rescue show "På liv och död" on TV4 the same year.

The band reunited in 2025 to participate in Melodifestivalen 2026, with the song ”Rakt in i elden”. The song qualified for the final. They placed fifth in the final.

== The Band ==
- Glenn Borgkvist – vocals
- Mats Nilsson – guitar, backing vocals
- Ulf Johansson – bass guitar, backing vocals
- Olle Östberg – keyboard, backing vocals
- Tom Börjesson – drums, backing vocals

== Discography ==
=== Albums ===
- 1999 – En riktig man (Start Klart Records).
- 2001 – Leka med elden (Start Klart Records).
- 2002 – Rök'n'roll (Start Klart Records).
- 2003 – 15 minuter (Start Klart Records).

=== EP ===
- 1995 – Brandsta City Släckers (Jolly Roger Records).

=== Singles ===
- 1999 – Gårdagens hjältar (Start Klart Records).
- 1999 – Vem kan släcka ett brinnande hjärta (Start Klart Records).
- 2002 – Kom och ta mig (Start Klart Records).
- 2003 – SommarHits! (Start Klart Records).
- 2003 – 15 minuter (Start Klart Records).
- 2006 – Faller (Start Klart Records).
- Jag vill bara ha dig av tomten (Start Klart Records).

=== Charting singles ===
Title	Year	Peak chart positions	Album
Title	Year	SWE	Album
"Kom och ta mig"	2002	4	Non-album singles
"Rakt in i elden"	2026	2	Non-album singles
"All in för Sverige (VM-låt 2026)"	2026	5	Non-album singles
