= Dooset daram =

Single by Meira Omar
- Released: 21 February 2026
- Length: 2:57
- Label: Warner Music Sweden AB; Emperial AB
- Songwriters: Anderz Wrethov; Jimmy "Joker" Thörnfeldt; Laurell Barker; Meira Omar

Meira Omar singles chronology
"Meri Jaan" (2025)	"Dooset daram" (2026)	"Mazaa" (2026)

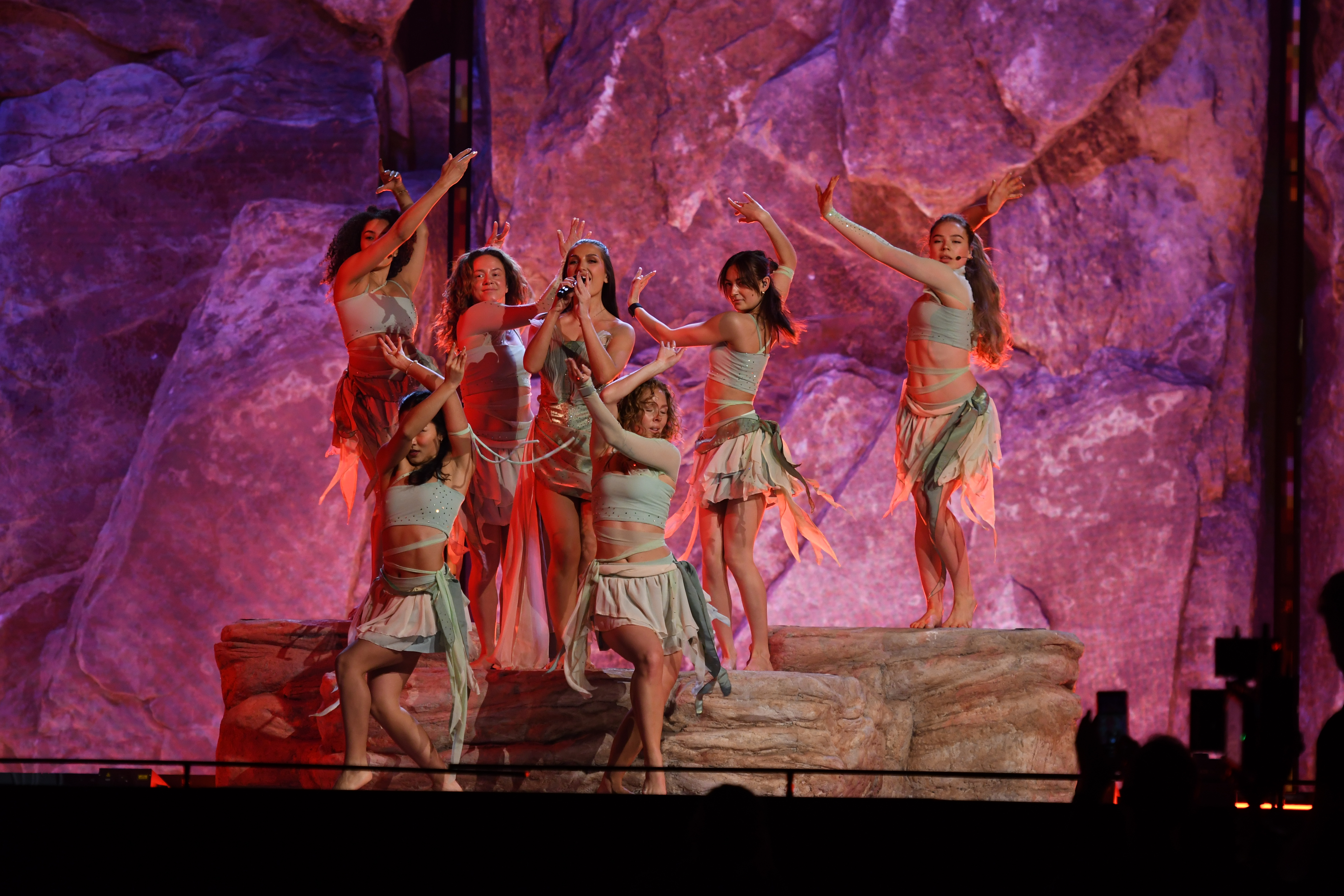
The song performed during the rehearsals for the Melodifestivalen final.

"Dooset daram" is a song by Swedish singer Meira Omar, released as a single on 21 February 2026. The song was performed in Melodifestivalen 2026. It qualified to the Final qualification round.

== Charts ==
Chart performance for "Dooset daram"
Chart (2026)	Peak position
Sweden (Sverigetopplistan)	5
