= Waste Your Love =

Single by Sanna Nielsen
- Released: 28 February 2026
- Length: 2:53
- Label: Warner Music Sweden AB
- Songwriters: Jimmy Jansson; Peter Boström; Thomas G:son

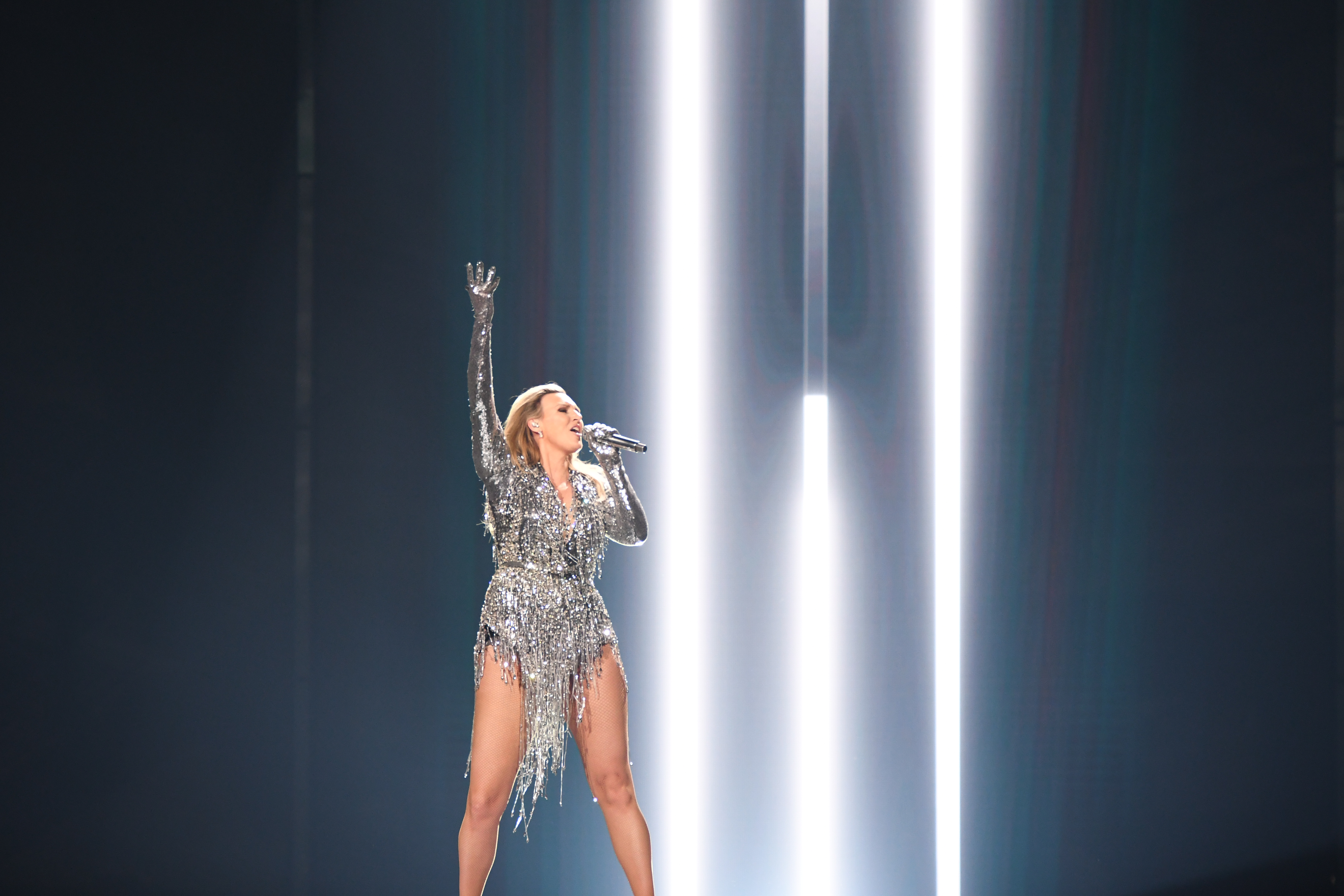
Sanna Nielsen performing the song during the rehearsals for the Melodifestivalen final.

"Waste Your Love" is a song by Swedish singer Sanna Nielsen, released as a single on 28 February 2026. The song was performed in Melodifestivalen 2026. It qualified for the final.

== Charts ==
Chart performance for "Waste Your Love"
Chart (2026)	Peak position
Sweden (Sverigetopplistan)	11
