= Felipe Leiva Wenger =

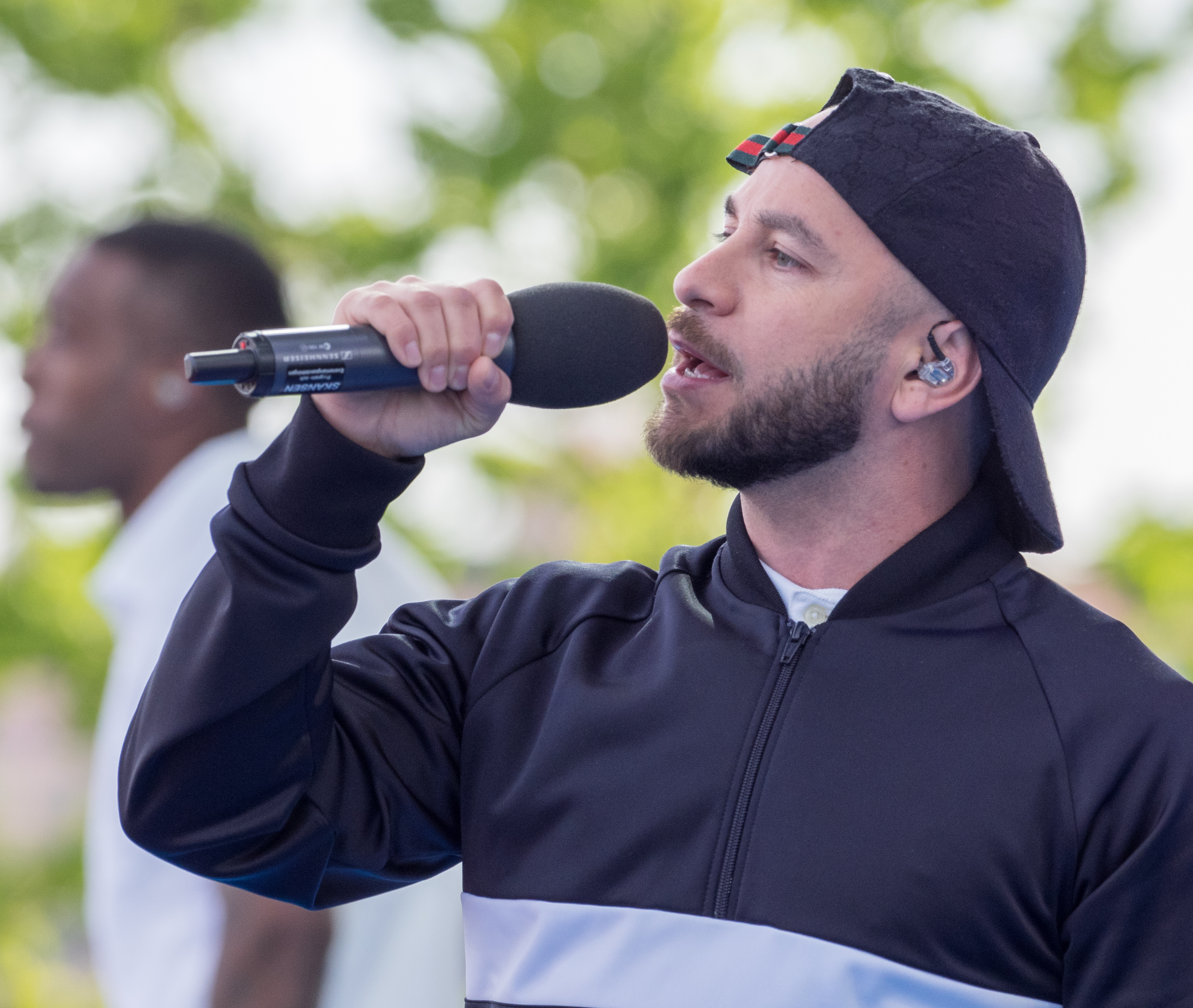
- Felipe Andres Leiva Wenger in 2016

Background information
- Also known as: Fille
- Born: Felipe Andres Leiva Wenger; 25 April 1980 (age 45); Concepción, Chile
- Genres: Rap
- Occupations: Singer, rapper
- Member of: Ison & Fille

Felipe Andres Leiva Wenger (born 25 April 1980), also known as Fille and Lilla Al-Fadji, is a Swedish singer and rapper. Since 2000, he has been a part of the rap duo Ison & Fille. He has also played as the character Lilla Al-Fadji since 2008.

He performed the song "Delulu" in Melodifestivalen 2026 as the character Lilla Al-Fadji, making it to the finals. He placed eighth in the final.

== Discography ==
=== Singles ===
Title	Year	Peak chart positions	Album
Title	Year	SWE	Album
"Jalla det är fredag"	2024	— (Note: "Jalla det är fredag" did not enter the Swedish Singellista Chart, but peaked at number 7 on the Swedish Heatseeker Chart.)	Non-album singles
"Delulu"	2026	2	Non-album singles
