= Ison & Fille =

Swedish hip hop duo

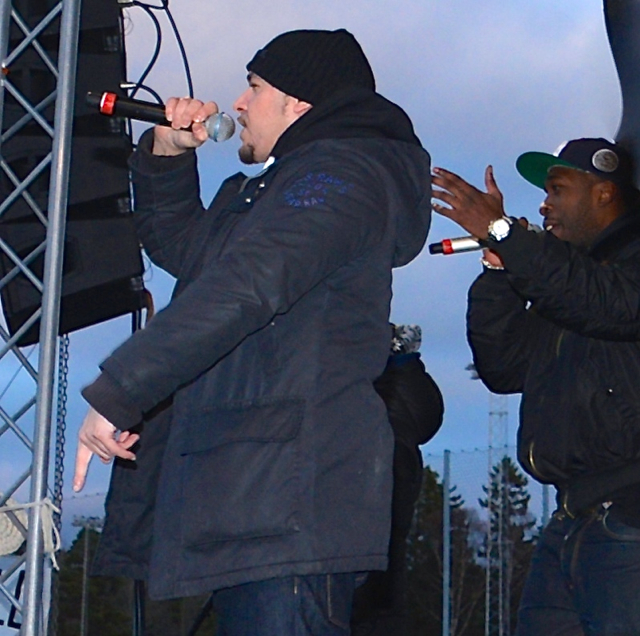
- Ison & Fille in Antiracism Demonstration in Kärrtorp on 22 December 2013.

Background information
- Origin: Sweden
- Genre: Hip hop
- Years active: 1994-present
- Label: Hemmalaget
- Members: Ison Glasgow ("Ison"); Felipe Leiva Wenger ("Fille")
- Website: Official Facebook page

Ison and Fille more commonly Ison & Fille is a Swedish hip hop duo consisting of Ison Glasgow ("Ison") and Felipe Leiva Wenger ("Fille").

The two met in 1994 in JKS basketball club in Bredäng, Sweden. Their initial songs were included in a 2000 compilation album Den svenska underjorden (meaning the Swedish underground). Media attention on the duo came with ZTV, a Swedish television channel putting out Ison & Fille 2006 release "När vi glider".

The duo have cooperated with various artists like Swedish rapper Petter, Dekan Ahmed and the rap crew Highwon.

== Members ==
- Ison Glasgow ("Ison"), born October 8, 1980 (age 46), is a US-born rapper, but grew up in Bredäng. He immigrated to Sweden in 1986. His father died when he was just 13.
- Felipe Leiva Wenger ("Fille), born April 25, 1980 (age 46), comes from Chile and grew up in Vårberg. He immigrated to Sweden in 1985 with his parents and two other siblings. Soon after the father left to Barbados where he died.

== In popular culture ==
The duo also took part in the Swedish TV series Leende guldbruna ögon broadcast on Sveriges Television (SVT) where they played the roles of Carlos and Mike. This was followed by appearances in another television series, Lilla Al-Fadji & Co broadcast on Kanal 5 and in comedy series Sverige dansar och ler. Ison and Fille has toured Sweden extensively since the early 2000s. Ison served as one of four judges in the inaugural season of the Swedish The X Factor in 2012, broadcast on TV4. He coached the "Boys" category. Ison & Fille subsequently took part in the Music Aid 2013 event with their songs "Vår sida av stan" and "Galen". In 2015, the duo participated in season six of the Swedish TV-serie Så mycket bättre, broadcast on TV4.

== Grillat & Grändy ==
Fille and Sabo also run the hip hop musical project Grillat & Grändy with occasional collaborations with Ison as well. In 2015, Grillat & Grändy released the album Kör vi tills att dör vi. The album charted on Sverigetopplistan, the official Swedish albums chart.

== Awards ==
In 2012, Ison & Fille won the P3 Gold Award in the category "Best Hip Hop / Soul Act of the Year".

== Discography ==
=== Albums ===
Year	Album	Peak positions	Certification
Year	Album	SWE	Certification
2002	Vår sida av stan	49	
2006	Stolthet	39	
2011	För evigt	12	
2014	Länge leve vi	9	
2019	Vackra liv	47	

=== EPs ===
- 2001: Tillbaka till gatan
- 2007: Vad e det för Mode?

=== Singles ===
Year	Single	Peak positions	Album
Year	Single	SWE	Album
2014	"Länge leve vi"	21	
2015	"Tänd ett Ljus"	30	
2015	"Nu har jag fått den jag vill ha"	63	
2015	"Allt hon vill ha"	75	
2015	"Handens fem fingrar"	66	
2019	"Vinnare" (featuring Cherrie and Imenella)	61	
2019	"Lägg ner dit vapen" (Recorded at Spotify Studios Stockholm)	56	
2021	"Från hjärtat" (featuring Aleks, Hoosam and Sabo)	48	

Other releases

- 2001: "När vi glider" (with Sabo & Ju-mazz)
- 2002: "Fakka ur"
- 2004: "Ta d dit"
- 2004: "Vill va Highwon" (with Hoosam, Sabo & Gurmo)
- 2004: "Haffa"
- 2006: "Ge mig" (with Sabo & Gurmo)
- 2006: "Lägg ner ditt vapen" (with Ismail Skalli El Hachimi)
- 2006: "Hela dan varje dag" (with Sabo)
- 2007: "Vad e det för mode"
- 2009: "Jag skrattar idag"
- 2009: "Ikväll är vi kungar"
- 2009: "För alla dom" (with Petter & Mogge)
- 2010: "Från hjärtat" (with Highwon)
- 2010: "Stationen" (with Stor & Aleks)
- 2011: "Galen"
- 2011: "Sena nätter, tomma glas" (with Veronica Maggio)
- 2013: "Vår sida av stan"

Collaborations

Year	Single	Peak positions	Album
Year	Single	SWE	Album
2009	"För alla dom" (Petter, Ison & Fille and Mogge)	21	
