= Gina Dirawi =

Swedish presenter, comedian, and singer (born 1990)

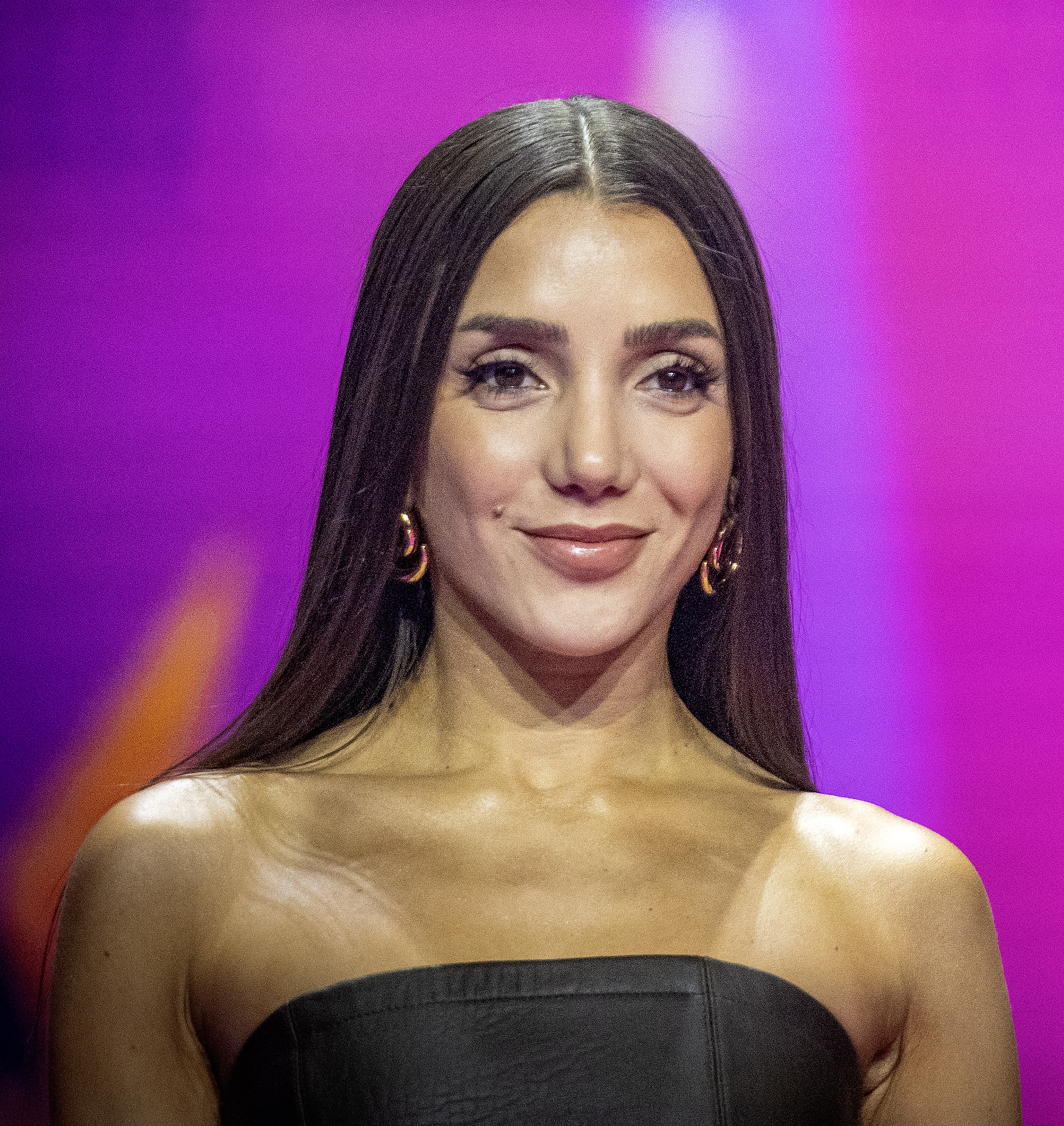
- Dirawi in 2026
- Born: 11 December 1990 (age 35); Sundsvall, Sweden
- Occupations: Television host, singer, comedian, actress
- Years active: 2009–present
- Known for: Hosting Melodifestivalen in 2012, 2013, 2016 and 2026

Gina Dirawi (Arabic: غنى ديراوي; born 11 December 1990) is a Swedish television presenter, singer-songwriter, author, comedian, radio personality, and actress. Best known as the only woman to host Melodifestivalen on four occasions, she has also hosted Swedish award ceremonies like Kristallen, Grammis, and Guldbagge Awards. She has also had several of her own programmes and also released music, a book, and has acted in film and theatre. In 2016, she played the lead role in the play Donna Juanita at the Stockholm City Theatre.

== Early and personal life ==
Dirawi was born on 11 December 1990 in Sundsvall. She has three siblings. Her parents are Palestinian but had grown up in Lebanese refugee camps. She was the second of four children. Her father had first moved to Sundsvall to study, convinced by his parents, and had eventually returned to Lebanon to marry Dirawi's mother. Her parents ultimately settled in Sundsvall, followed by her paternal grandparents a couple of years later. Her grandfather was an imam in Sundsvall until his death in March 2011.

She studied political science and rhetoric at Mid Sweden University.

== Career ==
=== 2009–2011: Blog and career start ===
Dirawi began her career in March 2009, with her blog Ana Gina (which means "I am Gina" in Arabic), and by August of the same year began vlogging.

Dirawi is considered Sweden's first true YouTuber. In 2009, she reached the final auditions for Idol on TV4.

Her vlog included satirical depictions of recurring characters from Swedish and Palestinian culture. She continued to gain popularity by sharing videos on YouTube, where her videos have over 18 million views as of May 2016.

Dirawi's characters included:

Sister Khadidje – a Muslim woman Svennemorsan Bettan – a Swedish mom Discoturken Dario – a young immigrant man Fjortisen Fippan – a stereotypical teenage girl Through these characters, she aimed to challenge prejudices and stereotypes using humor as a tool. Her goal was to provoke feelings and opinions through humor and provocation, which she achieved as her clips and characters gained widespread attention. However, during this period, Dirawi also faced serious death threats.

Dirawi is best known as the first woman ever to host Melodifestivalen on three occasions: in 2012 alongside Helena Bergström and Sarah Dawn Finer, in 2013 alongside Danny Saucedo and in 2016 with guest co-hosts in each show.

She won the award for best female TV host at the Kristallen in 2012 and 2013.

Dirawi also hosted the Swedish Grammy Awards in 2014 and 2015, as well as Musikhjälpen in 2011, 2012 and 2015, the same year she hosted SVT's traditional Christmas Eve programme.

It was announced on 20 April 2016 that Dirawi will be the Swedish spokesperson at the annual Eurovision Song Contest, announcing the results of the Swedish jury vote from Eurovision: The Party in the Tele2 Arena in Stockholm. She also hosted Studio Eurovision, a series of three one-hour shows broadcast before the two semi-finals and the final, covering news and events from the contest.

From February to August 2010, Dirawi worked as a mobile reporter for the radio channel P4 Västernorrland and had previously studied at Mid Sweden University.

Ahead of the 2010 general elections, Swedish Television (SVT) took notice of Dirawi, and she began blogging about the election on SVT's website. She subsequently hosted a web talk show, The Ana Gina Show, on SVT Play. The show aired 32 episodes with guests such as Carolina Gynning, Alex Schulman, Kristian Luuk, September, and Blondinbella. The program also featured her characters in various sketches.

In the fall of 2011, her second show, The Fabulous Life of Ana Gina, premiered on SVT Play, featuring guests like Wiz Khalifa, James Blunt, and Filip Hammar.

On 18 August 2011, Dirawi debuted as a summer host on Sommar i P1. Her program focused on the difficulties of being a young Muslim girl with an immigrant background in Swedish society. She also discussed her experiences witnessing the Stockholm bombings.

From 12–18 December 2011, she co-hosted Musikhjälpen 2011 on SVT and P3, alongside Timbuktu and Kodjo Akolor.

=== 2012–2013: Breakthrough ===
On 31 October 2011, it was announced that Dirawi, along with Sarah Dawn Finer and Helena Bergström, would host Melodifestivalen 2012. She was the first host of Melodifestivalen born in the 1990s and was praised for her performance. She later participated in SVT's Inför Eurovision Song Contest and co-commentated Eurovision 2012 broadcasts with scriptwriter Edward af Sillén.

In spring 2012, after Melodifestivalen, the second season of her series The Fabulous Life of Ana Gina began, this time filmed in Hollywood.

In summer 2012, starting 8 July, Dirawi hosted the radio program Hallå i P3 on Sveriges Radio, featuring well-known guests who answered listener questions. At the same time, she wrote as a columnist for Aftonbladet.

Dirawi returned as a co-host of Musikhjälpen in 2012, alongside Kodjo Akolor and Jason Diakité.

In Melodifestivalen 2013, Dirawi returned as host, this time with Danny Saucedo. She also hosted Studio Eurovision, a show that aired an hour before the Eurovision Song Contest 2013 in Malmö, where she interviewed personalities like Jean Paul Gaultier, Carl Bildt, and Eurovision participants.

On 1 June 2013, Dirawi hosted SVT's nationwide Hungerhjälpen campaign. She also returned to host Hallå i P3 in summer 2013 and co-hosted Kristallen 2013 with André Pops.

=== 2014–2018: TV and theater ===
In 2014, Dirawi hosted the Grammisgalan with British co-host Ray Cokes. She returned to host the awards in 2015, this time alone.

On 27 August 2014, Dirawi released her first single, "Love," which she wrote herself, coinciding with the premiere of her new series Ginas värld on SVT Flow, later shown on SVT1. Guests included Felicia Pearson from The Wire, Vietnamese Buddhist leader Thich Nhat Hanh, and Princess Märtha Louise of Norway.

On 10 March 2015, she released her second single, "Mad Woman."

On 21 March 2015, the series Ginas show premiered on SVT. The second season of Ginas värld premiered on 27 August 2015, featuring interviews with individuals such as young Israeli female soldiers, Rwandan victims and convicted murderers, and spiritual communities in Italy.

On 15 October 2015, the interview program Edit: Dirawi premiered on SVT2.

In November 2015, SVT announced that Dirawi would host the 2015 Christmas Eve broadcast, making her the youngest-ever host of the program. She was also one of three hosts for Musikhjälpen 2015.

In spring 2016, Dirawi was the main host of Melodifestivalen 2016. She also hosted the pre-show Studio ESC for Eurovision Song Contest 2016 and announced Sweden's votes during the competition.

In August 2016, Dirawi co-hosted Årets retro on SVT with Henrik Schyffert. That fall, she played the title role in the play Donna Juanita – En musikal fritt efter Hasse & Tage at Stockholm City Theatre, opposite Claire Wikholm, among others.

On 9 December 2016, Dirawi released the single "Hurt You So Bad," which she wrote herself.

In fall 2017 and 2018, Dirawi co-hosted 11 Friday finals of Idol with Per Lernström.

=== 2019–2022: Documentary, novel, and album ===
In December 2019, the documentary What Happened to Gina Dirawi? by Jane Magnusson aired on SVT, exploring her life under threats and with security guards.

On 4 March 2020, Dirawi published her debut novel Paradiset ligger under mammas fötter (Paradise lies beneath mum's feet"), about the friendship between two Swedish-Palestinian girls.

On 18 February 2022, Dirawi released her debut album, Meet Me in Jannah. Her songs "Sunday" and "Live and Die" appeared in the Netflix series Young Royals.

In January 2022 Gina hosted the Guldbagge Awards.

In May 2022, SVT premiered Dirawi's documentary series Gina Dirawi lever och dör, about trauma and existential anxiety.

Dirawi also served on the Kristallen jury in 2021, 2022, and 2023.

=== 2023–present ===
In 2023, the album Meet Me in Jannah was nominated for Pop Album of the Year at the Manifest Gala.

Ahead of the Grammis Gala 2023 (Swedish Grammys), Dirawi was nominated in the category “Music Video of the Year” for the song "Meet Me in Jannah". The video was also nominated in the category “Best Cinematography” at the Berlin Music Video Awards in 2022 and at The International Festival of the Art of Cinematography Energa CAMERIMAGE in Poland in 2022.

In 2022, Dirawi released the Arabic version of the soundtrack Urban City for the hit series Thin Blue Line.

Dirawi hosted Melodifestivalen 2026 together with Hampus Nessvold.

== Discography ==
=== Albums ===
Title	Released	Record label	Reference
Meet Me in Jannah	18 February 2022	Swimgood	

=== Singles ===
Title	Released	Record label	Reference
"Love"	27 August 2014	Gina Dirawi	
"Mad Woman"	10 March 2015	Universal Music	
