= Tongue Tied (AleXa song) =

Single by AleXa
- Released: 28 February 2026
- Length: 2:59
- Label: Sony Music Entertainment Sweden AB
- Songwriters: Alexaundra Christine Schneiderman; Ellen Berg; Jonatan Gusmark; Ludvig Evers; Moa "Cazzi Opeia" Carlebecker

"Tongue Tied" is a song by American singer AleXa, released as a single on 28 February 2026. The song was performed in Melodifestivalen 2026. It qualified to the Final qualification round of the competition.

== Charts ==
Chart performance for "Tongue Tied"
Chart (2026)	Peak position
Sweden (Sverigetopplistan)	12
