= Felix Manu =

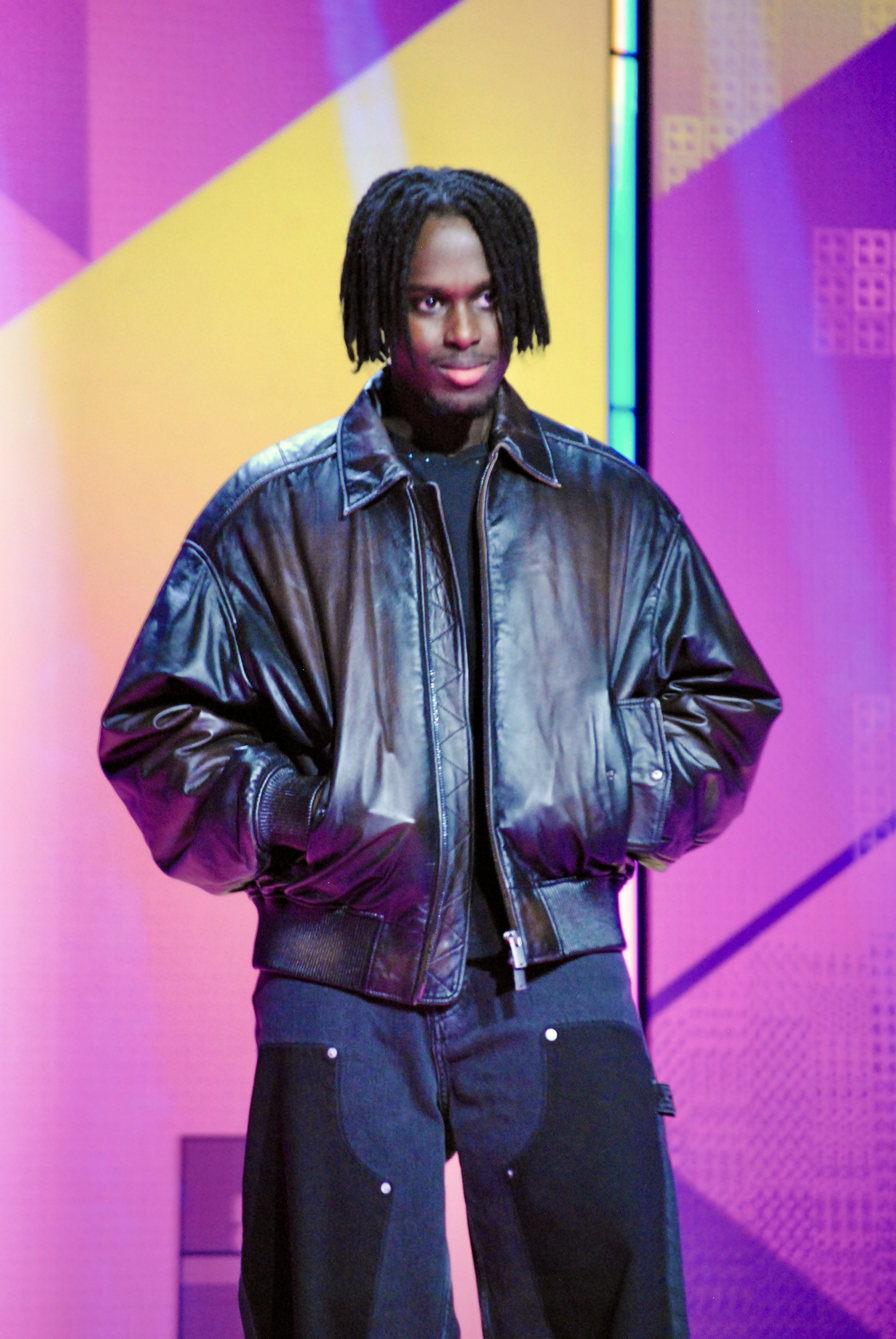
- Felix Manu in 2025

Background information
- Born: Felix Manu Irankunda; 6 August 2001 (age 25); Burundi
- Occupation: Singer

Felix Manu Irankunda (born 6 August 2001) is a Swedish singer and songwriter.

He performed the song "Hatar att jag älskar dig” in Melodifestivalen 2026 which he also co-wrote.

== Discography ==
=== Singles ===
Title	Year	Peak chart positions	Album
Title	Year	SWE	Album
"Hatar att jag älskar dig"	2026	50	Non-album singles
