= Klara Almström =

Swedish singer (born 2004)

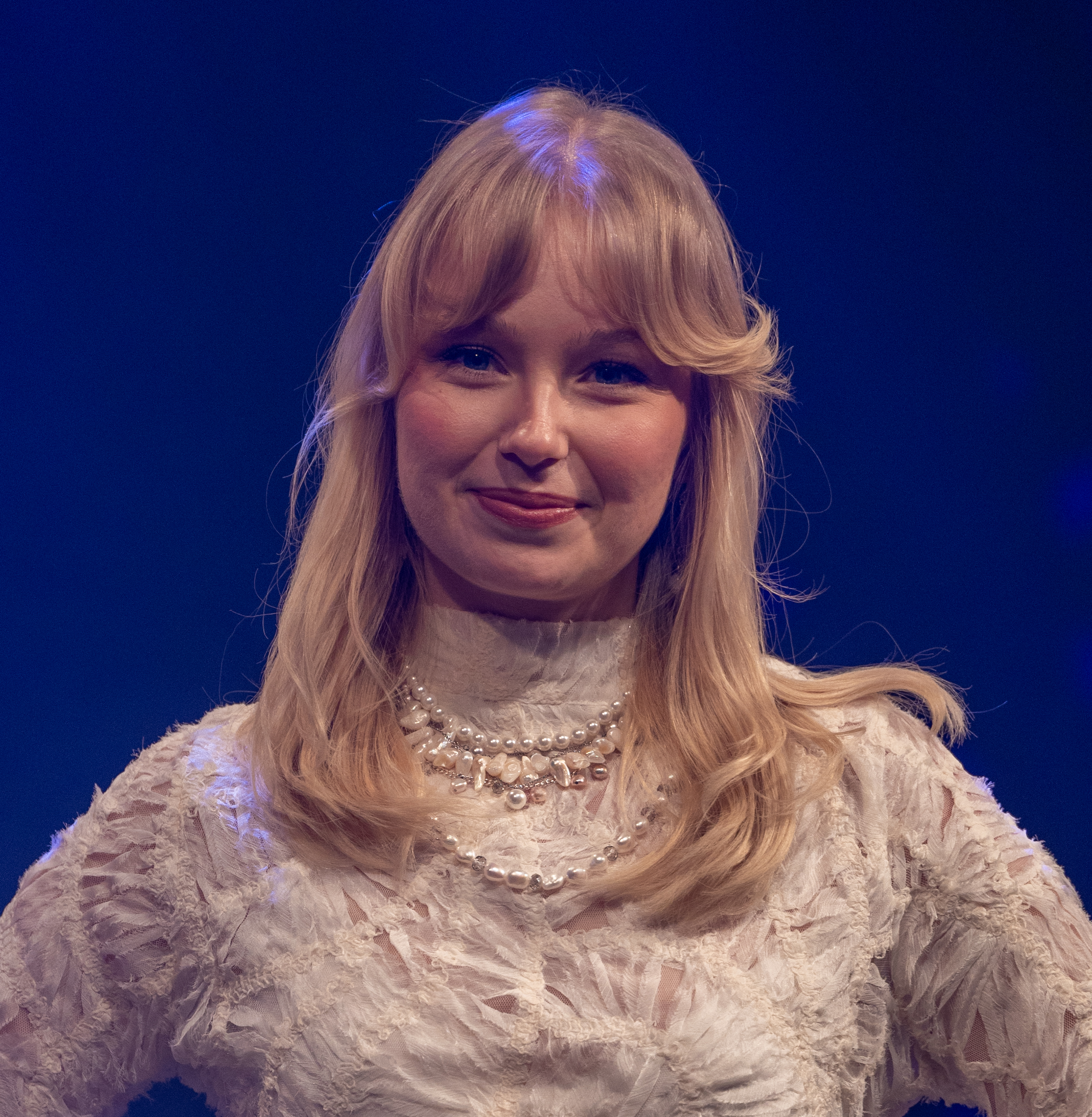
- Klara Almström in 2025

Background information
- Born: Klara Karolina Almström; 17 February 2004 (age 22)
- Occupation: Singer

Klara Karolina Almström, also known as Klara (born 17 February 2004) is a Swedish singer. She was a contestant on Idol 2022, where she placed third. She has also released the song "Find Your Way Home" along with Joakim Lundell.

She performed the song "Där hela världen väntar" in the second heat of Melodifestivalen 2026.

== Discography ==
=== Singles ===
Title	Year	Peak chart positions	Album
Title	Year	SWE	Album
"Find Your Way Home"	2020	43	Non-album singles
"Där hela världen väntar"	2026	33	Non-album singles
