= Cimberly Wanyonyi =

Swedish singer (born 2005)

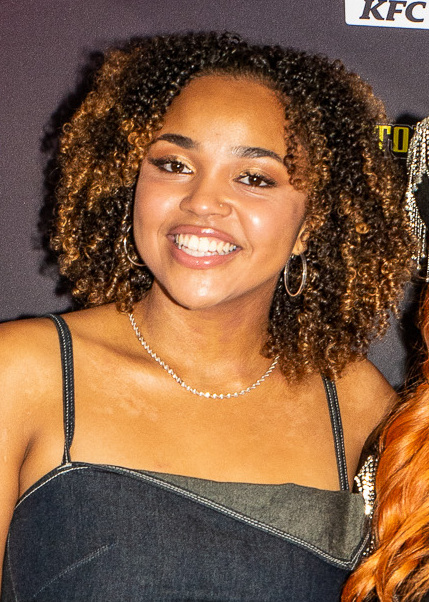
- Cimberly Wanyonyi in 2024

Background information
- Born: Cimberly-Malaika Tiffany Wanyonyi; 14 January 2005 (age 21); Skellefteå, Sweden
- Occupation: Singer

Cimberly-Malaika Tiffany Wanyonyi (born 14 January 2005), also known mononymously as Cimberly, is a Swedish singer. She won the 2023 season of the Swedish show Idol.

== Career ==
=== Idol ===
Wanyonyi nearly missed her opportunity to audition for the show, after her mother's car broke down.

Wanyonyi made the show's finals on 24 November 2023, in Avicii Arena. She competed against Saga Ludvigsson in the finals, winning on December 1.

Her winning single, "Won't Be Sorry", and will released by the Idol winner.

=== Melodifestivalen ===
Wanyonyi participated in Melodifestivalen 2026 in the fourth heat with the song "Eternity", where she qualified to the final. She placed sixth in the final.

== Personal life ==
Wanyonyi, who was born to a Finnish mother and Kenyan father, is from Skellefteå.

== Discography ==
=== Singles ===
List of singles, with selected chart positions
Title	Year	Peak chart positions	Album
Title	Year	SWE	Album
"Won't Be Sorry"	2023	—	Non-album singles
"Bye Bye Bye"	2024	—	Non-album singles
"Honor"	2025	—	Non-album singles
"Eternity"	2026	13	Non-album singles
