= Rakt in i elden =

Single by Brandsta City Släckers
- Released: 7 February 2026
- Length: 2:57
- Label: Emperial AB; Warner Music Sweden AB
- Songwriters: Anderz Wrethov; Elin Wrethov; Kristofer Strandberg; Robert Skowronski

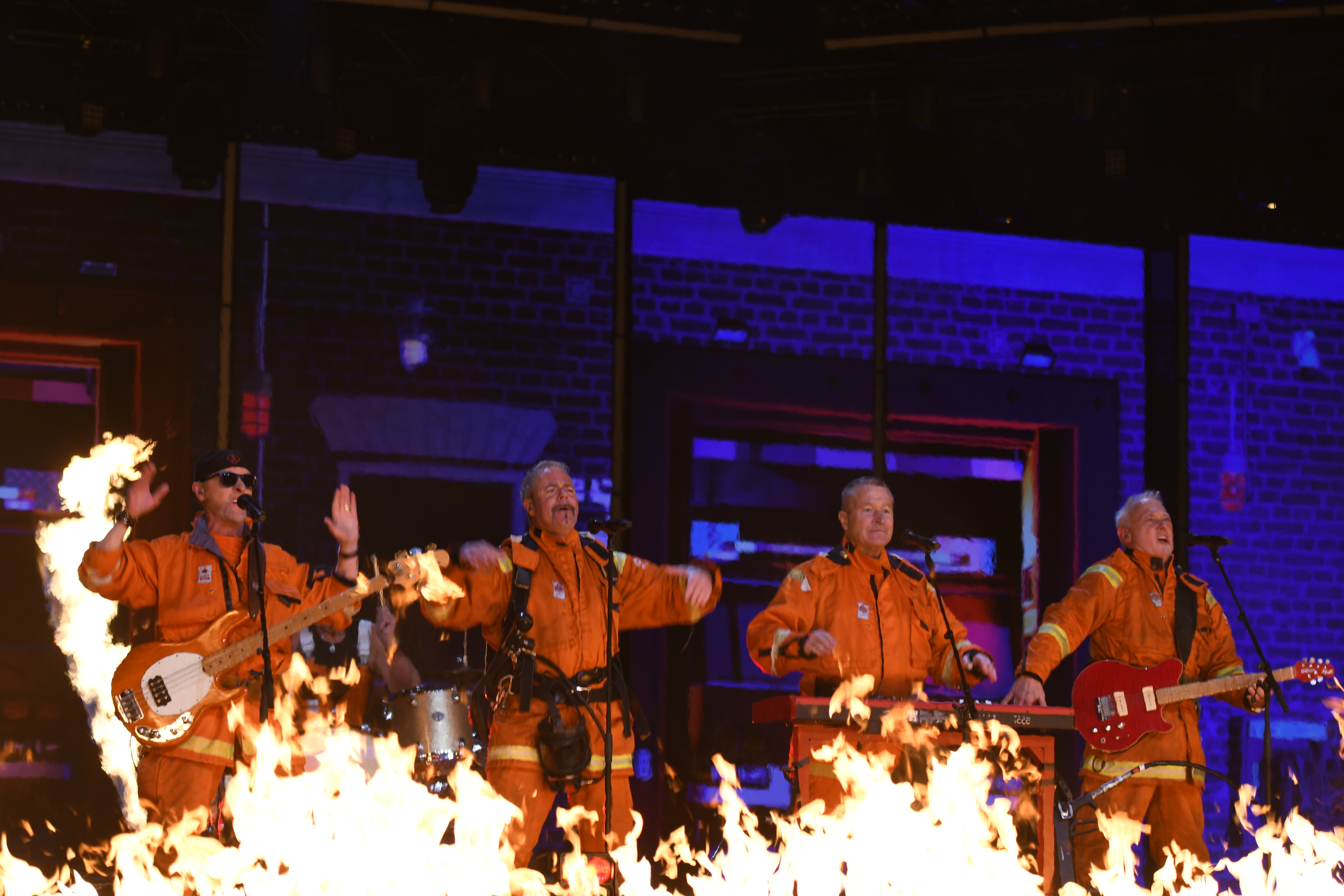
The song performed during the rehearsals for the Melodifestivalen final.

"Rakt in i elden" is a Swedish-language song by Swedish band Brandsta City Släckers, released as a single on 7 February 2026. The song was performed in Melodifestivalen 2026. It qualified for the final.

== Charts ==
Chart performance for "Rakt in i elden"
Chart (2026)	Peak position
Sweden (Sverigetopplistan)	2
