= Meira Omar =

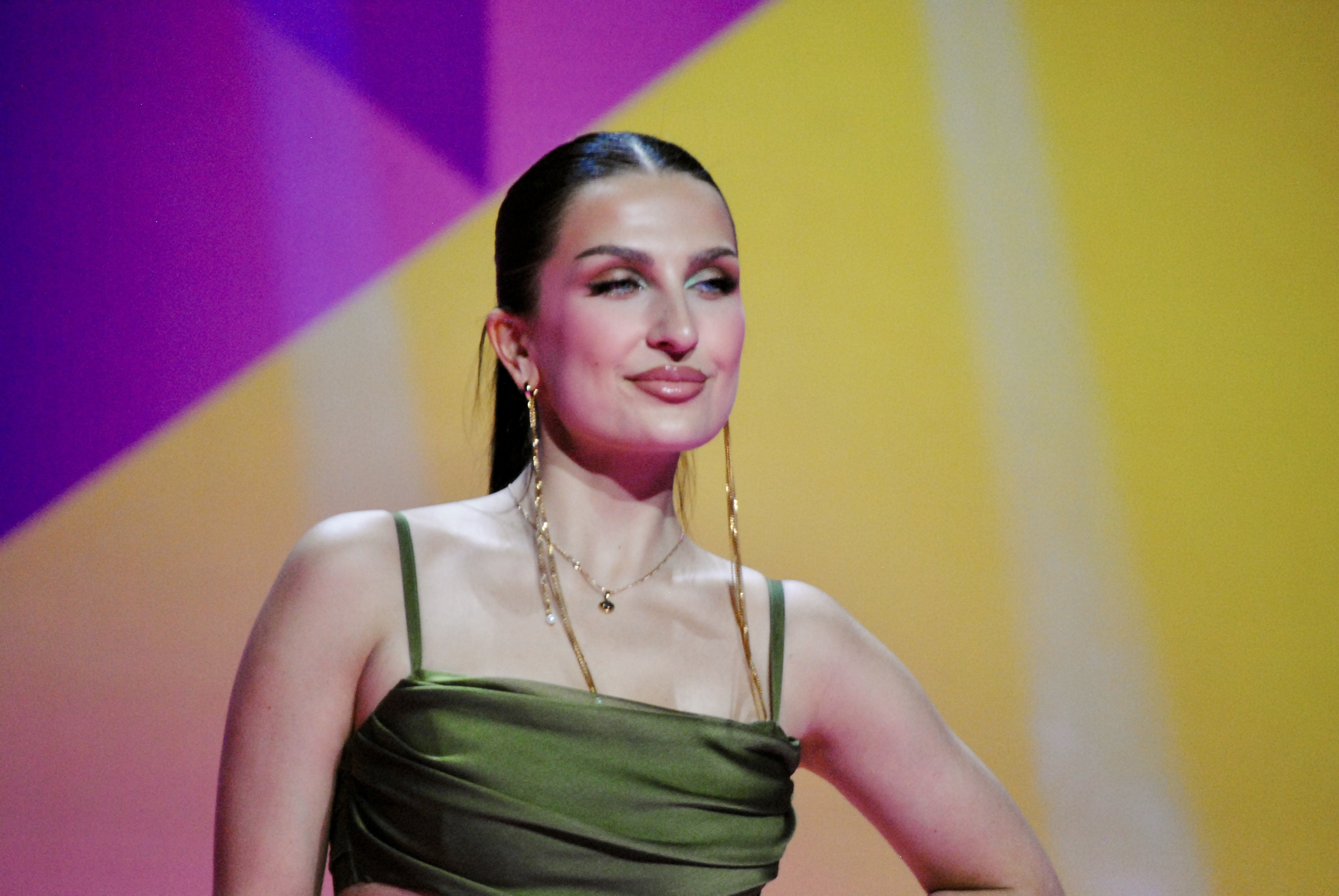
- Omar during Melodifestivalen 2026

Background information
- Born: Meira Omar; 17 June 1993 (age 32); Kabul, Islamic State of Afghanistan
- Genres: Pop
- Instrument: Vocals
- Years active: 2025–present

Meira Omar (born 17 June 1993) is an Afghan-born Swedish singer. In 2024, Omar was a contestant on the Netflix series Love Is Blind: Sweden, where she met and married Oskar Nordstrand.

Meira Omar performed the song "Hush Hush" in Melodifestivalen 2025. On 8 March 2025 she placed 10th in the final of the contest.

In Melodifestivalen 2026, she performed the song ”Dooset daram”, placing ninth in the final.

== Early life ==
Meira Omar was born on 17 June 1993 in Kabul, Afghanistan. Omar's mother is from Russia and her father is from Afghanistan.

She lived in India for five years.

== Discography ==
=== Singles ===
| Title | Year | Peak chart positions | Certifications | Album |
| Title | Year | SWE | Certifications | Album |
|---|---|---|---|---|
| "Dive" | 2024 | — | | Non-album singles |
| "Hush Hush" | 2025 | 3 | GLF: Gold | Non-album singles |
| "Meri Jaan" | 2025 | — | | Non-album singles |
| "Dooset daram" | 2026 | 5 | | Non-album singles |
| "Mazaa" (with Liamoo) | 2026 | — | | Non-album singles |
