= Emilia Pantić =

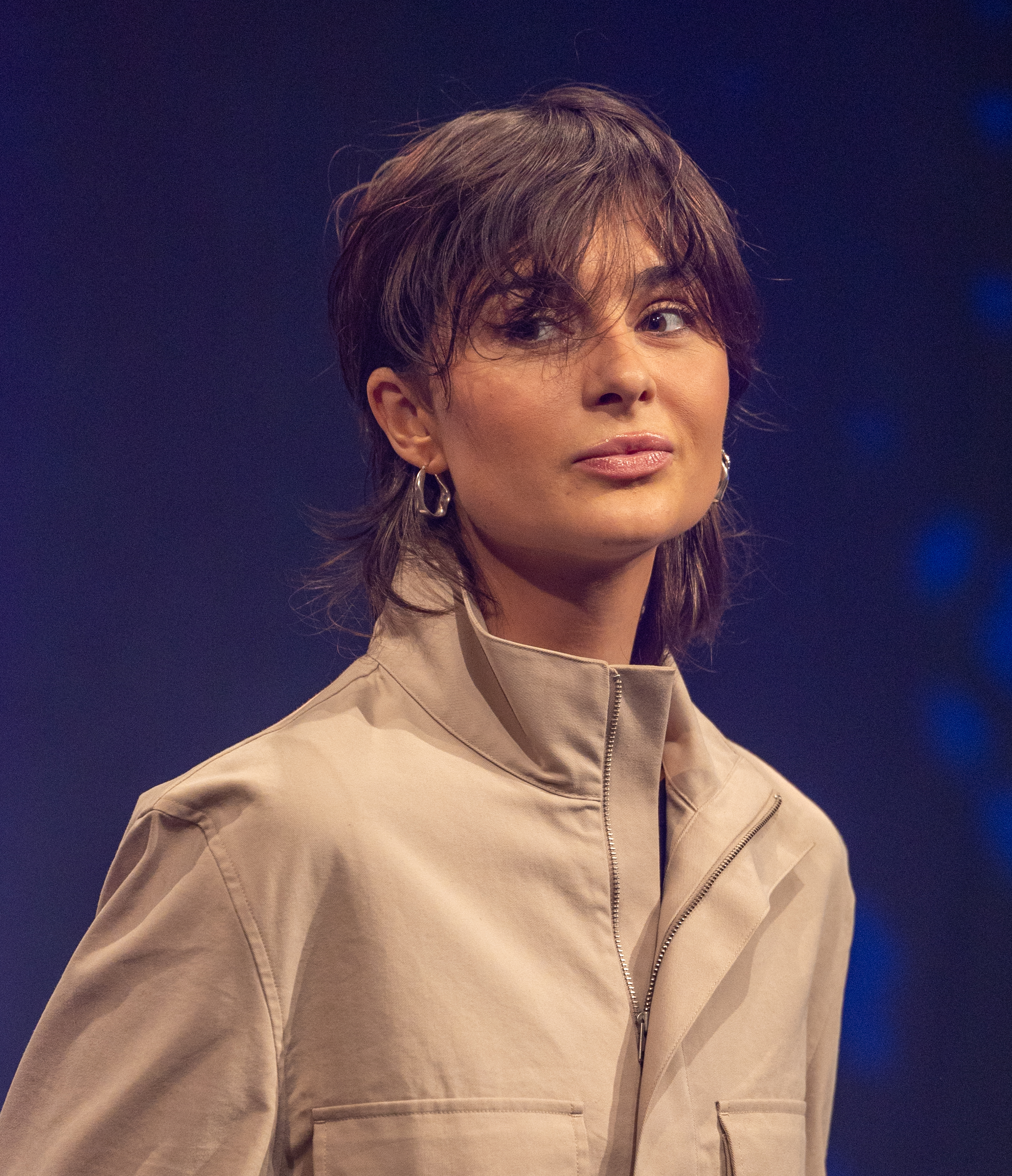
- Emilia Pantić in 2025

Background information
- Born: Emilia Pantić; 14 June 2000 (age 26)
- Occupation: Singer

Emilia Pantić (born 14 June 2000) is a Swedish singer. She debuted with the song "Roadkill" in 2022. In 2024, she participated in her first tour where she opened for the main act Thomas Stenström. Her song "För evigt" has been viewed 3.8 million times on Spotify.

Emilia Pantić participated in Melodifestivalen 2026 with the song "Ingenting", which placed sixth in Heat 3 and failed to qualify for the final.

She is in a relationship with a woman.

== Discography ==
=== Singles ===
Title	Year	Peak chart positions	Album
Title	Year	SWE	Album
"Ingenting"	2026	54	Non-album single
