= Hampus Nessvold =

Swedish comedian

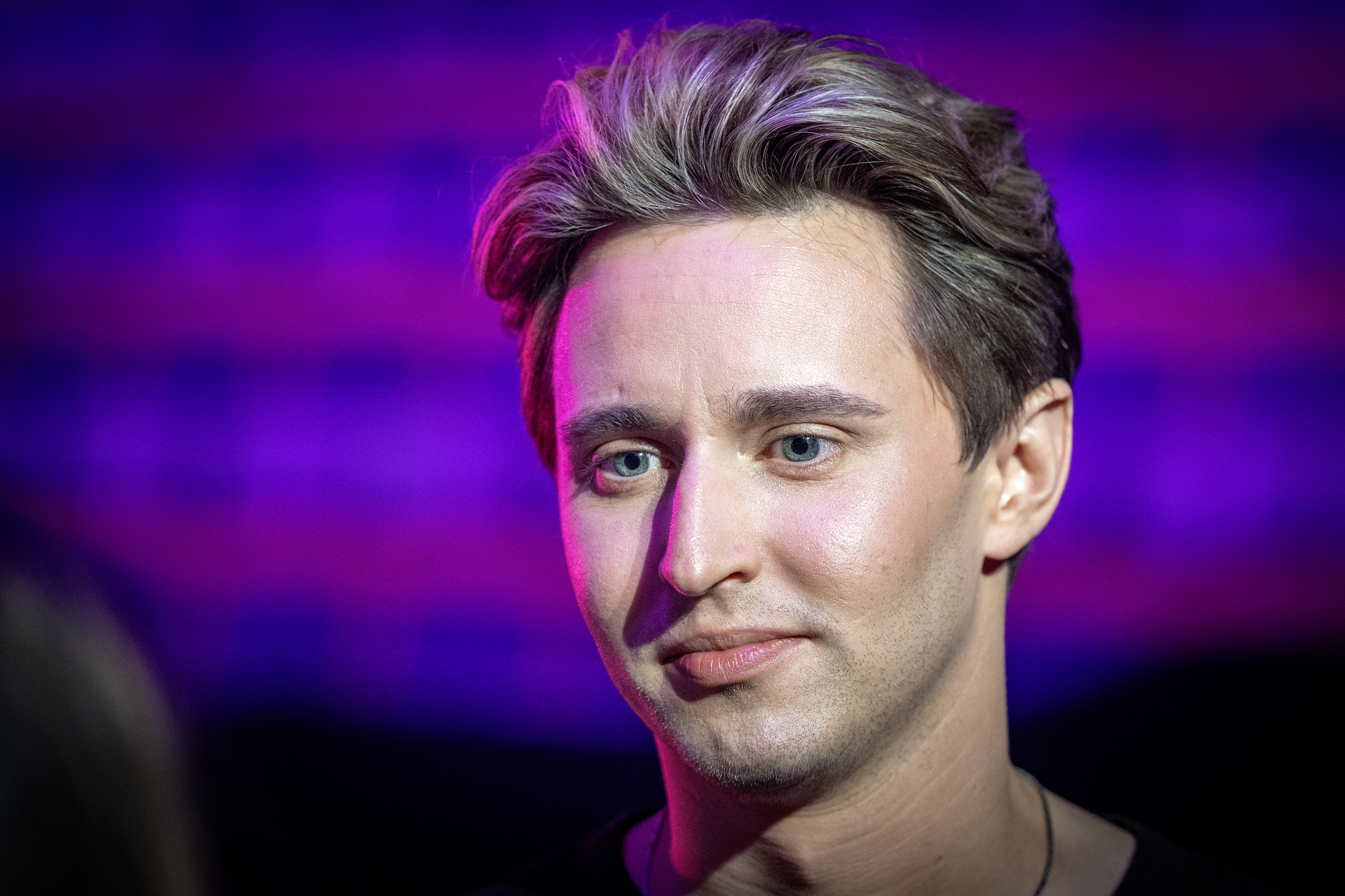
- Nessvold during Melodifestivalen 2026
- Born: Hampus Erik Nessvold; 9 May 1996 (age 30)

Hampus Erik Nessvold (born 9 May 1996) is a Swedish comedian, actor, and scriptwriter. Nessvold presented the Sveriges Radio show Zia och Nessvold i P3 (2017–2018) along with Oscar Zia. In 2021, Nessvold appeared in his own documentary film on SVT called Hur är Hampus i sängen?.

In 2023, Nessvold acted in the play Peter Pan går åt helvete at Cirkus in Stockholm along with Pernilla Wahlgren, Per Andersson, David Batra and Ola Forssmed. In 2023, Nessvold along with Mia Skäringer did the stage show Just idag mår vi bra.

Nessvold hosted Melodifestivalen 2026, together with Gina Dirawi.
