= Nordichallen =

Indoor arena in Sundsvall, Sweden

Coordinates: 62°24′41″N 17°20′59″E

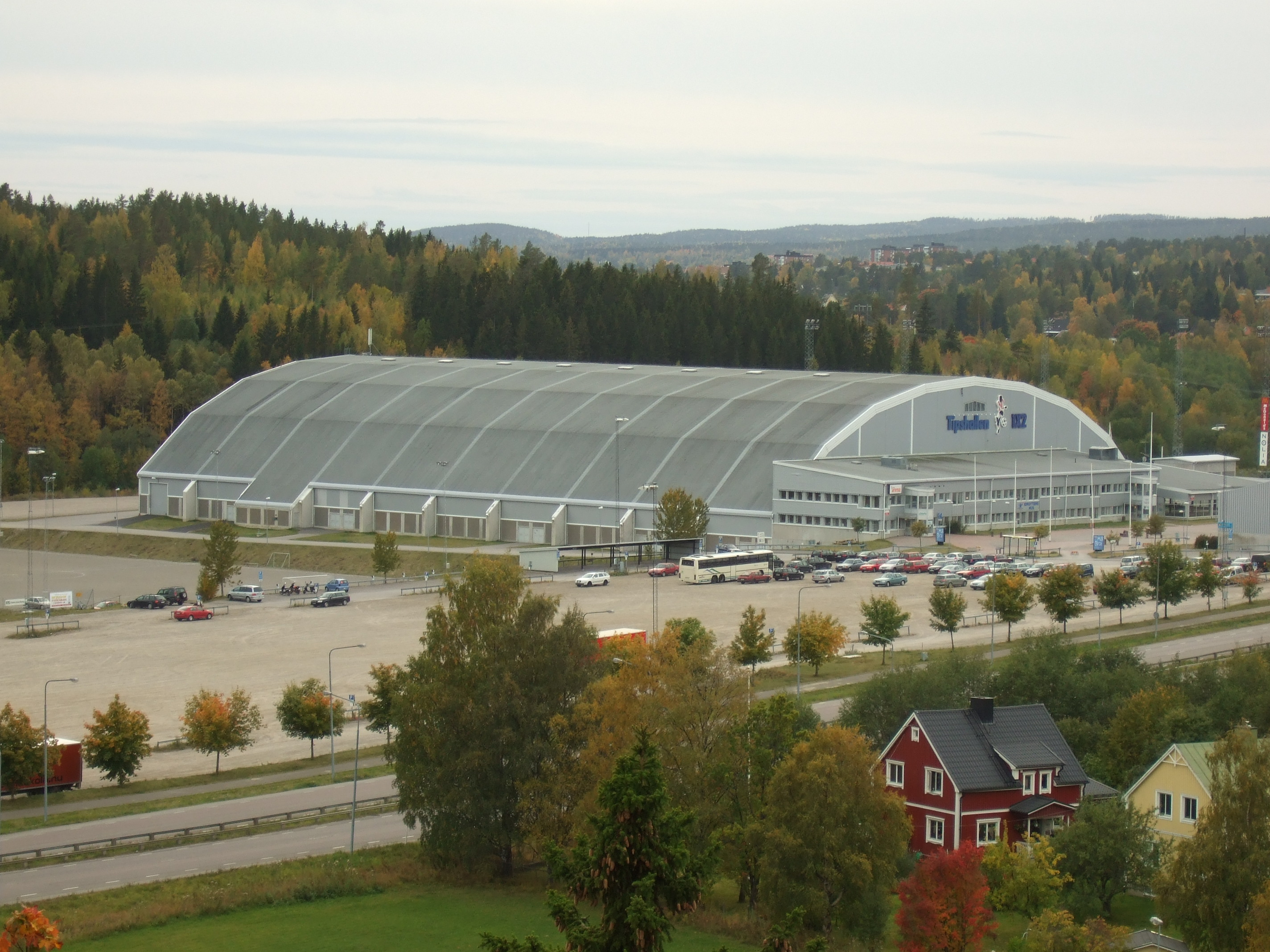
- Nordichallen in September 2007
- Interactive map of Nordichallen
- Location: Sundsvall, Sweden
- Capacity: 9,300
- Surface: Grass
- Field size: 105 m × 65 m (344 ft × 213 ft)

Construction
- Opened: January 1992

Nordichallen, also known as the Gärdehov Arena, is an indoor arena located in Sundsvall, Sweden. It opened in January 1992. Its dimensions are 105 m × 65 m (344 ft × 213 ft), area 10,500 m^{2} (113,000 sq ft), seating capacity 9,300, ceiling height 21 m (69 ft). It hosts football matches and concerts.

It is part of the Gärdehov venue complex.

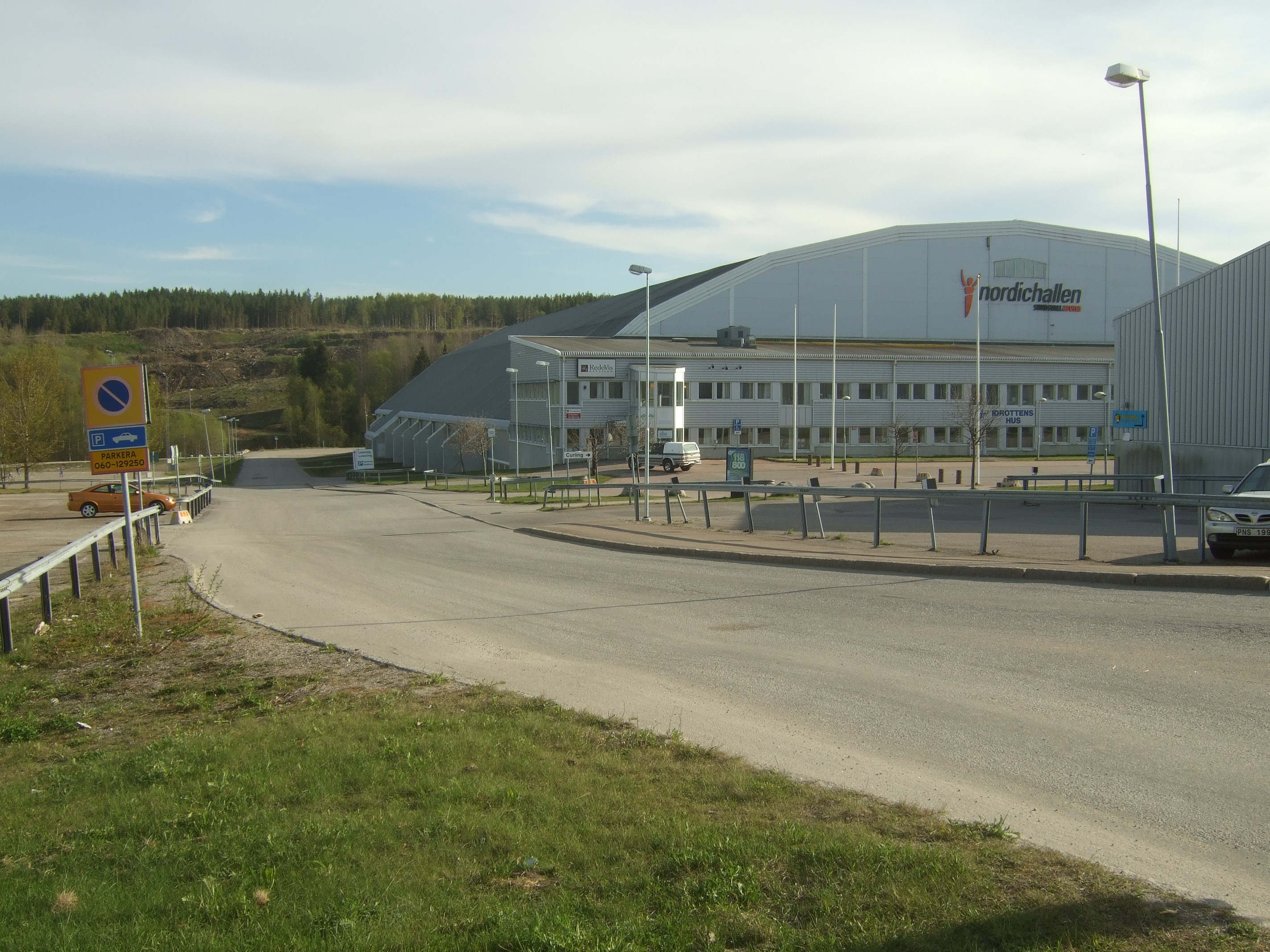
Nordichallen
