= Show Me What Love Is =

2025 song by Erik Segerstedt

Single by Erik Segerstedt
- Released: 7 February 2025
- Genre: Pop-rock
- Length: 3:02
- Label: Warner
- Songwriters: Erik Segerstedt; Mattias Andréasson; Pontus Söderman
- Producer: Mattias Andréasson

Erik Segerstedt singles chronology
"Piece of Me" (2023)	"Show Me What Love Is" (2025)	"Happier Now" (2025)

Melodifestivalen performances
- "Show Me What Love Is" (Heat 2) on YouTube "Show Me What Love Is" (Final) on YouTube

"Show Me What Love Is" is a song by Swedish singer and songwriter Erik Segerstedt. A midtempo track about meeting someone and wanting to build a life together, It was written by Segerstedt, Mattias Andréasson and Pontus Söderman, and released as a single on 7 February 2025 through Warner. The song competed in Melodifestivalen 2025, finishing ninth.

== Background and composition ==
The song was written by Erik Segerstedt, Mattias Andréasson, and Pontus Söderman. Segerstedt described it as a midtempo track about meeting someone and wanting them to show how they can build a life together. He cited the Swedish television series Married at First Sight as an inspiration.

== Critical reception ==
Ronny Larsson and Ken Olausson from the magazine QX rated the song 4/5, describing it as a "radio-friendly midtempo ballad" that "grows with each listen", praising its "familiar-sounding" chorus. The song is noted for blending influences, described as "a bit of boyband and a bit of Coldplay in the same track", which Larsson called "a wonderful cocktail." While initially skeptical about another E.M.D.-related entry in Melodifestivalen, Olausson admitted that the song is a "radio hit broader than a motorway to Basel," comparing its appeal to Duncan Laurence's "Arcade". Frida Lindström and Christian Gustafsson from Barometern jointly rated the song three out of five stars, calling it a "fairly conventional pop song" that stands out despite its familiarity. Lindström highlighted its "more upbeat" yet oddly nostalgic quality, comparing it to the theme of the television series Bron and praising its "slightly melancholic Gavin DeGraw vibe" that lingers memorably. Though doubting its victory chances, she predicted "heavy radio rotation this summer". Gustafsson agreed on its appeal, noting how the "Ed Sheeran-esque guy-with-a-piano pop" stood out in a weak semifinal as "something a little extra".

Maria Brander from Expressen gave the song 3/5, calling it "surprisingly good", praising its "melancholic tone" and Segerstedt's "strong vocal performance." While she believed the song "deserved better", she criticised the staging as "somewhat messy and poorly conceived". Brander also noted an interesting progression in the performance, from melodic similarities to The Weeknd's "Blinding Lights" to a finale featuring "audience clap-along and confetti". Similarly, Eva Frantz from the Finnish broadcaster Yle gave the song a 3/5, stating that the song, in a "weaker Melodifestivalen year, would be a pre-contest favorite", noting that it follows the typical sound of Swedish Eurovision entries. She criticised the performance for its lack of focus, first hiding behind a "musical-style piano", then running around interacting with "cheerful backing musicians", with some added confetti, suggesting that "more focus on him personally would have elevated the entry".

== Melodifestivalen 2025 ==
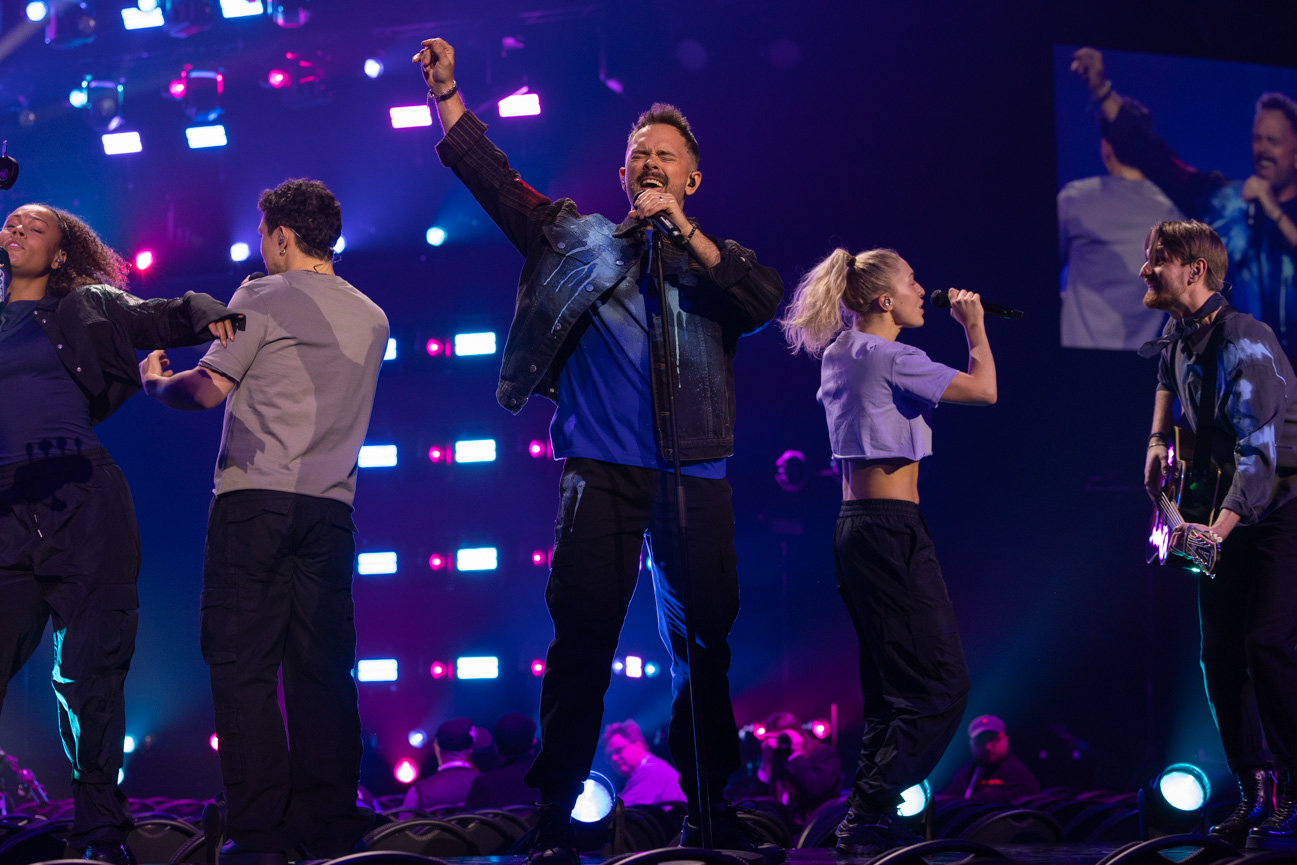
Segerstedt performing "Show Me What Love Is" at a dress rehearsal before the second heat of Melodifestivalen 2025.

On 26 November 2024, it was announced that the song will be competing in Melodifestivalen 2025, Sweden's national selection for the Eurovision Song Contest 2025. The song was drawn to compete in the second heat on 7 February 2025, performing after "Don Juan" by Schlagerz and before Klara Hammarström's "On and On and On". The song later qualified to the final.

Segerstedt performed a repeat of his performance in the final on 8 March 2025, performing after Scarlet's "Sweet n' Psycho" and before Maja Ivarsson's "Kamikaze Life". The song finished 9th overall, placing 10th from the juries and 8th from the televote, obtaining 24 points and 27 points, respectively, garnering 51 points in total.

For its Melodifestivalen performance, it featured Segerstedt sitting at a colour splashed piano wearing a matching colour splashed denim jacket. He is accompanied on stage with guitarists and a drummer. The staging goes darker as the performance progresses, the back screen patterns only reducing to isolated swirls. The psychedelic background imagery accelerates with the song, and Segerstedt, together with the guitarists, runs to the substage, joined by two backing vocalists. A confetti then rains down in the final chorus.

== Charts ==
Chart performance for "Show Me What Love Is"
Chart (2025)	Peak position
Sweden (Sverigetopplistan)	9

== Release history ==
Release dates and formats for "Show Me What Love Is"
Region	Date	Format(s)	Label	Type	Ref.
Various	7 February 2025	Digital download; streaming	Warner	Single	
