= On and On and On (Klara Hammarström song) =

Single by Klara Hammarström
- Released: 7 February 2025
- Length: 2:59
- Label: Mitt Hjärta; Universal
- Songwriters: Dino Medanhodzic; Jimmy Jansson; Klara Hammarström; Cazzi Opeia; Peter Boström; Thomas G:son
- Producers: Peter Boström; Dino Medanhodzic; Jimmy Jansson; Thomas G:son

Klara Hammarström singles chronology
"Can't Get Enough (Doctor Feelgood)" (2024)	"On and On and On" (2025)

Melodifestivalen performances
- "On and On and On" (Heat 2) on YouTube "On and On and On" (Final) on YouTube

"On and On and On" is a song by Swedish singer Klara Hammarström, released as a single on 7 February 2025. It was performed in Melodifestivalen 2025, finishing fourth.

== Critical reception ==
Ronny Larsson and Ken Olausson from the magazine QX both rated the song 5/5. Larsson described it as having "a wrestling-hook chorus" and "a high BPM", calling it "a lovely MTV drama with dancers, Roman pillars and spastic dance moves". He praised Hammarström as "a wonderful pop star" and said the song "grows with every listen", describing it as a "stylish dance explosion". Further, Olausson called the entry "high-octane pop" that blends "Dua Lipa with old-school Gaga", and likened Hammarström's comeback to "the love child of Kylie Minogue and Ava Max". He highlighted its unexpected "Cossack dance" section and wrote that the song is one of the best in this year's contest.

In Barometern, Christian Gustafsson and Frida Lindström offered contrasting views. Gustafsson gave the song four out of five stars, describing it as "no deeper than a puddle, but brutally effective". He highlighted the song's irresistible energy and concluded that the track is highly engaging and hard to resist. Lindström, however, was far less favorable, giving it two out of five stars. She wrote that her "aversion to the chorus is strong" and questioned "how so many songwriters could agree on such an irritating hook". While she found the verse and bridge promising, she felt they gave "a false hope of musical quality", concluding that the song "completely misses the mark", despite "some elements that hit right".

Maria Brander of Expressen gave the song a 3/5, describing it as "a hysterical workout, a turbocharged funfair ride and a fairly catchy madness all in one". She compared Hammarström's performance to "tumbling down through an ancient wonderland", moving "from a heavenly paradise to a pulsing inferno" led by "whirling mummy dancers" and an "accelerating Kalinka beat". She concluded that the result was chaotic yet energetic and engaging. Eva Frantz of Yle gave the song a 2/5, writing that it was "as Mello as it gets", featuring "thumping beats, wind machines, a singer lying on the floor singing, dancers in white, and a long line of songwriters”. While she noted that "there's absolutely nothing wrong with it," Frantz felt the entry ultimately came across as "extremely impersonal".

== Melodifestivalen 2025 ==
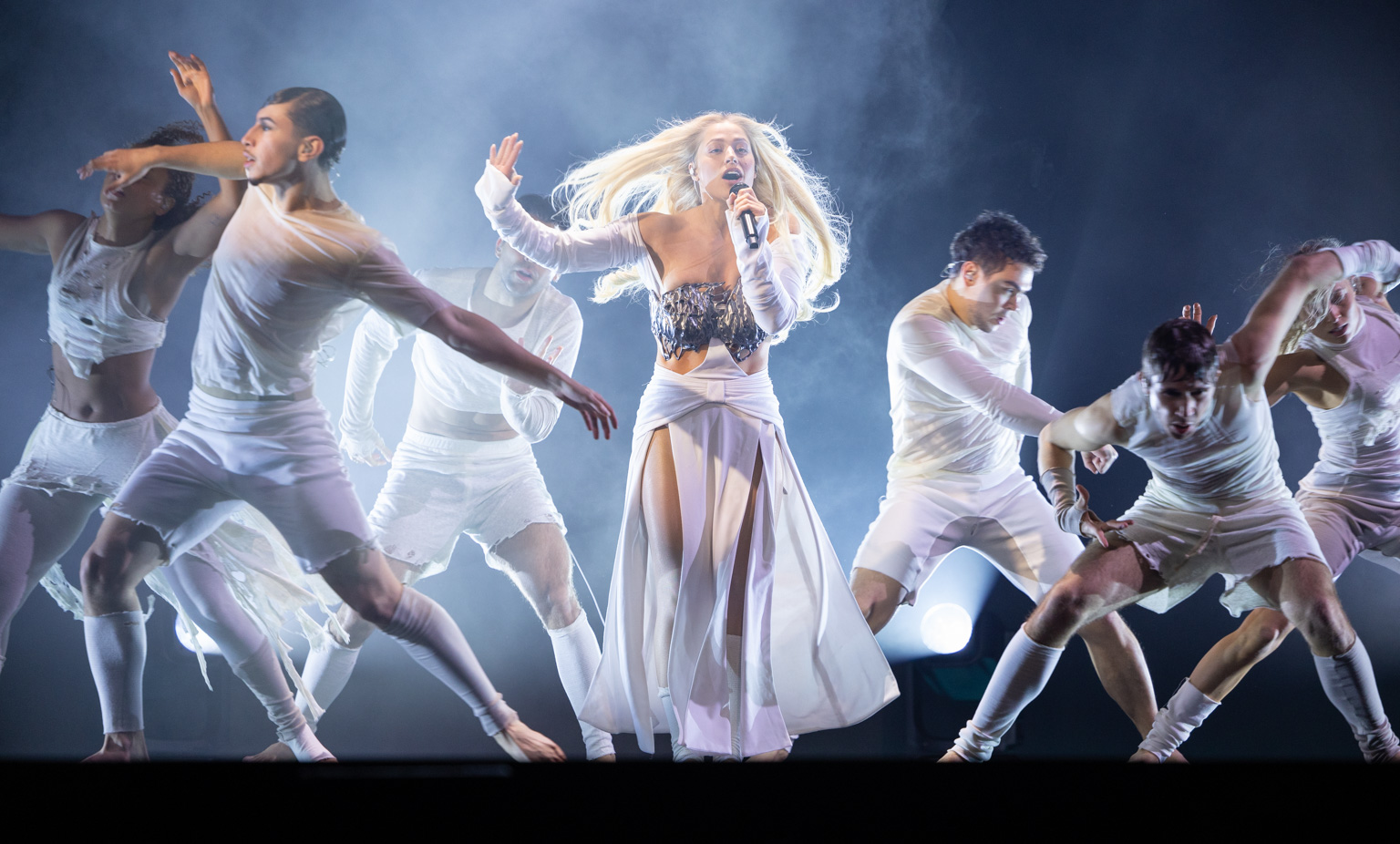
Hammarström performing "On and On and On" at a dress rehearsal before the second heat of Melodifestivalen 2025.

On 26 November 2024, it was announced that the song will be competing in Melodifestivalen 2025, Sweden's national selection for the Eurovision Song Contest 2025. The song was drawn to compete in the second heat on 7 February 2025, performing after "Show Me What Love Is" by Erik Segerstedt and before "The Heart of a Swedish Cowboy" by Fredrik Lundman. The song later qualified to the final, placing second in its heat.

Hammarström performed a repeat of her performance in the final on 8 March 2025, performing after Greczula's "Believe Me" and before Scarlet's "Sweet n' Psycho". The song finished fourth overall, placing seventh from the juries and fourth from the televote, obtaining 34 points and 43 points, respectively, garnering 77 points in total.

== Charts ==
=== Weekly charts ===
Weekly chart performance for "On and On and On"
Chart (2025)	Peak position
Sweden (Sverigetopplistan)	1

=== Year-end charts ===
Year-end chart performance for "On and On and On"
Chart (2025)	Position
Sweden (Sverigetopplistan)	21

== Awards and nominations ==
Awards and nominations for "On and On and On"
Year	Award	Category	Result	Ref.
2026	Grammis	Song of the Year	Nominated	
