= Melodifestivalen 2025 =

Swedish music competition

Dates and venues
- Heat 1: 1 February 2025; Coop Norrbotten Arena, Luleå
- Heat 2: 8 February 2025; Scandinavium, Gothenburg
- Heat 3: 15 February 2025; ABB Arena, Västerås
- Heat 4: 22 February 2025; Malmö Arena, Malmö
- Heat 5: 1 March 2025; Husqvarna Garden, Jönköping
- Final: 8 March 2025; Strawberry Arena, Stockholm

Production
- Broadcaster: Sveriges Television (SVT)
- Executive producer: Christel Tholse Willers
- Competition producer: Karin Gunnarsson
- Presenters: Edvin Törnblom; Kristina "Keyyo" Petrushina

Participants
- Number of entries: 30
- Number of finalists: 12

Vote
- Voting system: Heats and final qualification: 100% public vote Final: 50% public vote, 50% jury
- Winning song: "Bara bada bastu" by KAJ

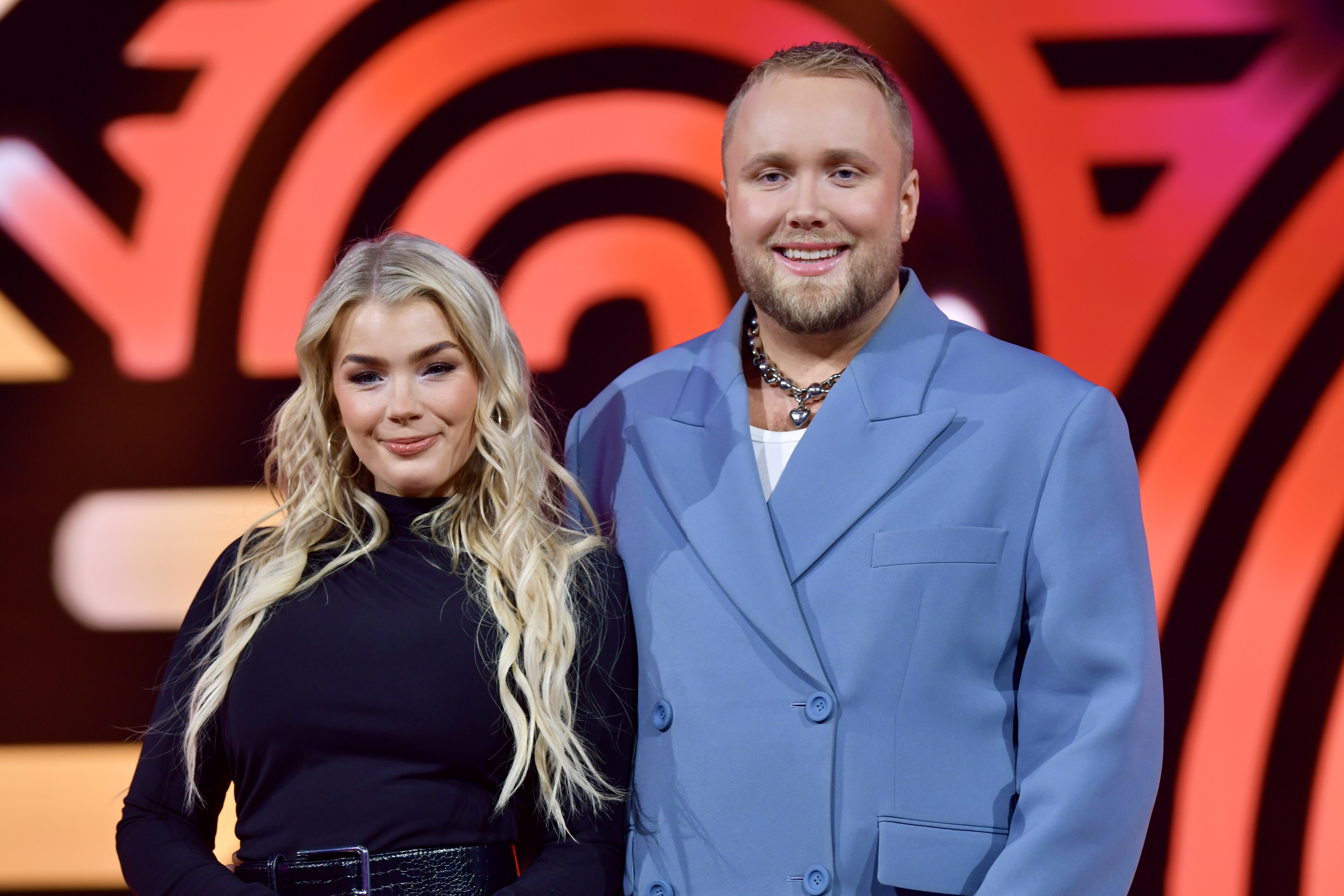
The hosts Keyyo and Edvin Törnblom.

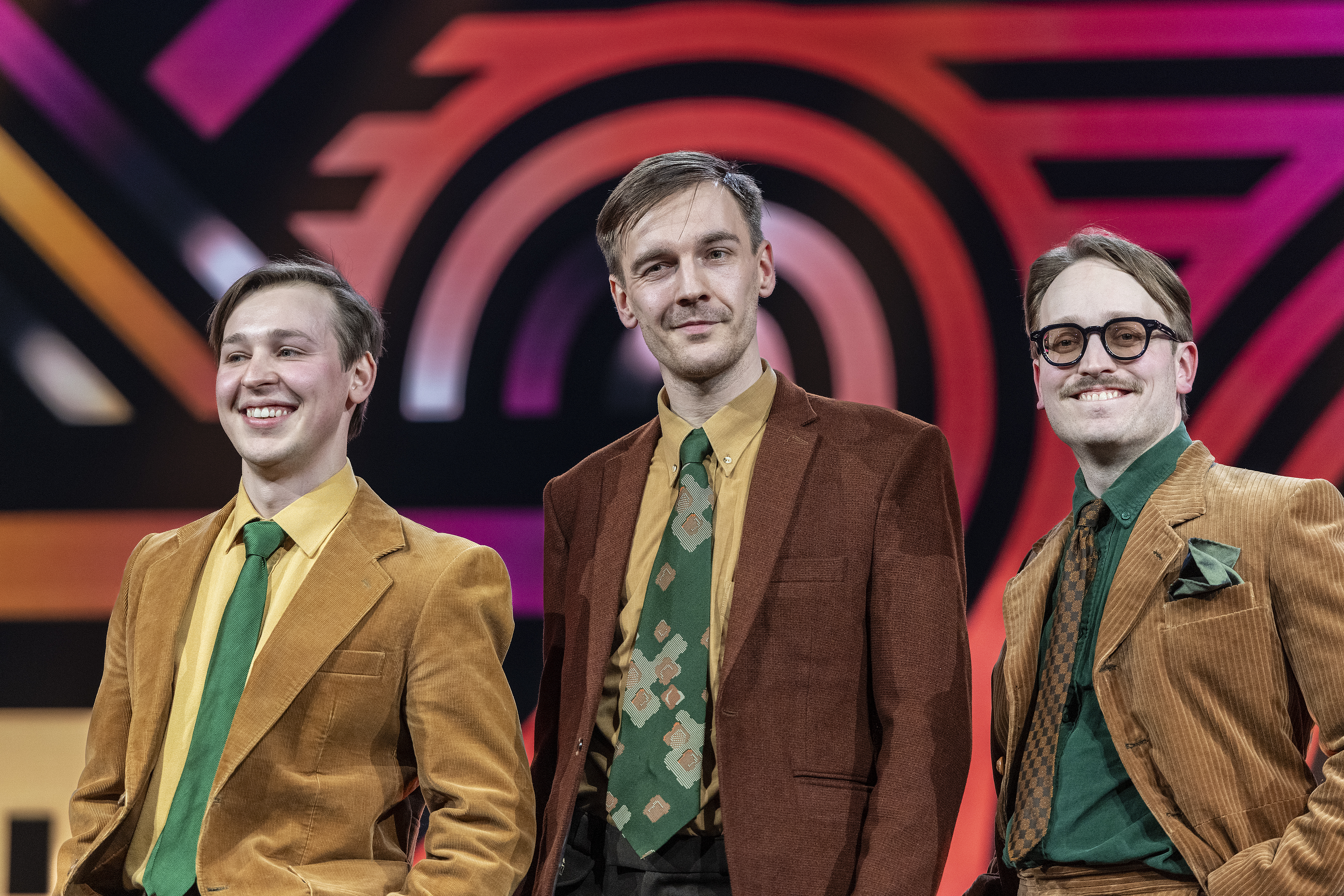
KAJ were the winners of Melodifestivalen 2025.

Melodifestivalen 2025 was the 65th edition of the Swedish music competition Melodifestivalen, organised by Sveriges Television (SVT) and took place over a six-week period between 1 February and 8 March 2025, hosted by Edvin Törnblom and Kristina "Keyyo" Petrushina. The winners of the competition, KAJ with the song "Bara bada bastu", represented Sweden in the Eurovision Song Contest 2025, where they finished fourth with 321 points.

== Format ==
Melodifestivalen 2025 had six weekly shows held in six Swedish cities (Luleå, Gothenburg, Västerås, Malmö, Jönköping and Stockholm). Edvin Törnblom and Kristina "Keyyo" Petrushina were announced as the hosts of the competition on 7 November 2024.

Changes to the format were announced on 22 August 2024. A total of 30 entries took part in the competition across five heats. Each heat consisted of six songs, with the top two songs directly qualifying for the final. In a change from previous editions, where the qualifier from the first voting round was determined solely by raw votes and the second round used the age group points system, in 2025 it was the opposite: the first round used the points system, and the second round used raw vote totals. Unlike in the previous edition, only the third-placing song proceeded to a final qualification round at the end of the fifth heat, which featured five songs instead of ten. The top two songs in the final qualification then progressed to the final, which comprised 12 songs. The winner of the final was determined by the usual 50/50 combination of votes from the public and an international jury.

For the first time since the multi-show Melodifestivalen format was introduced in 2002, the competing entries were released on streaming platforms on the day preceding their respective heat. Previously, the entries which had qualified directly to the final could not be released before the conclusion of the last heat, while those qualifying for the repechage (known over the years under different names) and the eliminated entries could be released following the broadcast of the heat they competed in.

Competition schedule
Show	Date	City	Venue
Heat 1	1 February 2025	Luleå	Coop Norrbotten Arena
Heat 2	8 February 2025	Gothenburg	Scandinavium
Heat 3	15 February 2025	Västerås	ABB Arena
Heat 4	22 February 2025	Malmö	Malmö Arena
Heat 5	1 March 2025	Jönköping	Husqvarna Garden
Final	8 March 2025	Stockholm	Strawberry Arena

== Competing entries ==
A public submission window was open between 23 August and 14 September 2024 to select the competing entries. Upon closing the submission period, SVT announced that 2,794 applications had been received, from which 15 competing entries were then selected by a professional jury chaired by Melodifestivalen producer and artistic director Karin Gunnarsson; the second set of 15 contestants were selected by a dedicated SVT board both from the received submissions and by direct invitation of artists. The selected entries were announced on 26 November 2024.

Artist	Song	Songwriter(s)
Adrian Macéus	"Vår första gång"	Adam "Rymdpojken" Englund; Adrian Björklund; Adrian Macéus; Hugo Geijer Persson; William Pärlenskog
Albin Johnsén feat. Pa	"Upp i luften"	Albin Johnsén; Christoffer Balazik; Fernand MP; Mattias Andréasson; Pa Modou
AmenA	"Do Good Be Better"	AmenA; Sandra Bjurman; Stefan Örn
Andreas Lundstedt	"Vicious"	Andreas Lundstedt; Dino Medanhodzic; Laurell Barker; Liamoo
Angelino	"Teardrops"	Jimmy "Joker" Thörnfeldt; Joy Deb; Linnea Deb; Tusse Chiza
Annika Wickihalder	"Life Again"	Annika Wickihalder; Herman Gardarfve; Patrik Jean
Arvingarna	"Ring Baby Ring"	Stefan Brunzell; Thomas G:son
Arwin	"This Dream of Mine"	Anderz Wrethov; Arwin Ismail; Jimmy "Joker" Thörnfeldt; Julie "Kill J" Aagaard; Peter Boström
Björn Holmgren	"Rädda mig"	Björn Holmgren; David Lindgren Zacharias; Jens Hult
Dolly Style	"Yihaa"	Caroline Aronsson; David Lindgren Zacharias; Herman Gardarfve; Melanie Wehbe; Mikaela Samuelsson; Patrik Jean
Ella Tiritiello	"Bara du är där"	Adam "Rymdpojken" Englund; David Björk; Loreen Talhaoui
Erik Segerstedt	"Show Me What Love Is"	Erik Segerstedt; Mattias Andréasson; Pontus Söderman
Fredrik Lundman	"The Heart of a Swedish Cowboy"	Erik Bernholm; Maja Francis; Thomas G:son
Greczula	"Believe Me"	Amanda Nordelius; John Russel; Kristofer Greczula
John Lundvik	"Voice of the Silent"	Jimmy Jansson; John Lundvik; Peter Boström; Thomas G:son
KAJ	"Bara bada bastu"	Anderz Wrethov; Axel Åhman; Jakob Norrgård; Kevin Holmström; Kristofer Strandberg; Robert Skowronski
Kaliffa	"Salute"	Anderz Wrethov; Jakob ”Big Brain” Malmlöf; Jimmy "Joker" Thörnfeldt; Kaliffa Karlsson; Robert Skowronski
Klara Hammarström	"On and On and On"	Dino Medanhodzic; Jimmy Jansson; Klara Hammarström; Moa "Cazzi Opeia" Carlebecker; Peter Boström; Thomas G:son
Linnea Henriksson	"Den känslan"	David Lindgren Zacharias; Linnea Henriksson; Sebastian Atas
Maja Ivarsson	"Kamikaze Life"	Andreas "Giri" Lindbergh; Jimmy "Joker" Thörnfeldt; Joy Deb; Linnea Deb; Maja Ivarsson
Malou Prytz	"24K Gold"	Anderz Wrethov; Jimmy "Joker" Thörnfeldt; Julie "Kill J" Aagaard; Malou Prytz
Måns Zelmerlöw	"Revolution"	David Lindgren Zacharias; Måns Zelmerlöw; Ola Svensson; Sebastian Atas
Meira Omar	"Hush Hush"	Anderz Wrethov; Dino Medanhodzic; Laurell Barker; Meira Omar
Nomi Tales	"Funniest Thing"	Adam Breitholtz; Herman Gardarfve; Jacob Lundahl; Nomi Bontegard; Simon Weidersjö
Saga Ludvigsson	"Hate You So Much"	Herman Gardarfve; Lisa Desmond; Saga Ludvigsson
Scarlet	"Sweet n' Psycho"	Anderz Wrethov; Dino Medanhodzic; Jimmy "Joker" Thörnfeldt; Scarlet Hunts; Thirsty
Schlagerz	"Don Juan"	Anna Engh; Mikael Karlsson
Tennessee Tears	"Yours"	Gavin Jones; Jonas Hermansson; Pär Westerlund; Tilda Feuk
Victoria Silvstedt	"Love It!"	Jimmy Jansson; Thomas G:son
Vilhelm Buchaus	"I'm Yours"	Elias Edman; Jonatan Lahti; Simon Alexander Ward; Vilhelm Buchaus

== Contest overview ==
=== Heat 1 ===
The first heat took place on 1 February 2025 at the Coop Norrbotten Arena in Luleå. A total of 8,894,468 votes were cast using 528,263 devices, with SEK 405,655 collected for Radiohjälpen.

R/O	Artist	Song	Round 1			Round 2			Result
R/O	Artist	Song	Votes	Points	Place	Votes	Total votes	Place	Result
1	Albin Johnsén feat. Pa	"Upp i luften"	1,089,032	45	4	596,636	1,685,668	3	Out
2	Maja Ivarsson	"Kamikaze Life"	1,115,693	67	2	683,513	1,799,206	1	Final
3	John Lundvik	"Voice of the Silent"	1,355,309	86	1	—N/a			Final
4	Meira Omar	"Hush Hush"	1,068,752	58	3	647,625	1,716,377	2	Final qual.
5	Adrian Macéus	"Vår första gång"	879,946	30	5	455,470	1,335,416	4	Out
6	Linnea Henriksson	"Den känslan"	660,354	26	6	342,138	1,002,492	5	Out

Round 1 detailed televoting results
R/O	Song	Age groups							Tel.
R/O	Song	3‍–‍9	10‍–‍15	16‍–‍29	30‍–‍44	45‍–‍59	60‍–‍74	75+	Tel.
1	"Upp i luften"	12	10	8	5	5	1	1	3
2	"Kamikaze Life"	3	3	3	12	12	12	10	12
3	"Voice of the Silent"	10	12	12	10	10	10	12	10
4	"Hush Hush"	8	8	10	8	8	5	3	8
5	"Vår första gång"	5	5	5	3	3	3	5	1
6	"Den känslan"	1	1	1	1	1	8	8	5

=== Heat 2 ===
The second heat took place on 8 February 2025 at the Scandinavium in Gothenburg. A total of 9,309,031 votes were cast using 551,178 devices, with SEK 339,383 collected for Radiohjälpen.

R/O	Artist	Song	Round 1			Round 2			Result
R/O	Artist	Song	Votes	Points	Place	Votes	Total votes	Place	Result
1	Nomi Tales	"Funniest Thing"	987,656	30	5	516,379	1,504,035	3	Out
2	Schlagerz	"Don Juan"	544,789	19	6	193,691	738,480	5	Out
3	Erik Segerstedt	"Show Me What Love Is"	1,339,899	86	1	—N/a			Final
4	Klara Hammarström	"On and On and On"	1,528,183	83	2	1,053,759	2,581,942	1	Final
5	Fredrik Lundman	"The Heart of a Swedish Cowboy"	945,235	52	3	514,404	1,459,639	4	Out
6	Kaliffa	"Salute"	1,072,881	42	4	612,155	1,685,036	2	Final qual.

Round 1 detailed televoting results
R/O	Song	Age groups							Tel.
R/O	Song	3‍–‍9	10‍–‍15	16‍–‍29	30‍–‍44	45‍–‍59	60‍–‍74	75+	Tel.
1	"Funniest Thing"	8	8	3	3	3	3	1	1
2	"Don Juan"	1	1	1	1	1	1	5	8
3	"Show Me What Love Is"	10	10	12	10	10	12	12	10
4	"On and On and On"	12	12	10	12	12	10	10	5
5	"The Heart of a Swedish Cowboy"	3	3	5	5	8	8	8	12
6	"Salute"	5	5	8	8	5	5	3	3

=== Heat 3 ===
The third heat took place on 15 February 2025 at the ABB Arena in Västerås. A total of 8,224,411 votes were cast using 497,032 devices, with SEK 258,943 collected for Radiohjälpen.

R/O	Artist	Song	Round 1			Round 2			Result
R/O	Artist	Song	Votes	Points	Place	Votes	Total votes	Place	Result
1	Greczula	"Believe Me"	1,069,958	74	1	—N/a			Final
2	Malou Prytz	"24K Gold"	935,017	42	5	448,986	1,384,003	3	Out
3	Björn Holmgren	"Rädda mig"	798,822	21	6	338,552	1,137,374	5	Out
4	Dolly Style	"Yihaa"	1,057,492	54	3	600,798	1,658,290	2	Final qual.
5	Angelino	"Teardrops"	883,140	48	4	416,917	1,300,057	4	Out
6	Annika Wickihalder	"Life Again"	1,054,647	73	2	620,082	1,674,729	1	Final

Round 1 detailed televoting results
R/O	Song	Age groups							Tel.
R/O	Song	3‍–‍9	10‍–‍15	16‍–‍29	30‍–‍44	45‍–‍59	60‍–‍74	75+	Tel.
1	"Believe Me"	5	3	12	12	12	10	10	10
2	"24K Gold"	10	10	3	5	5	3	5	1
3	"Rädda mig"	3	1	8	1	1	1	1	5
4	"Yihaa"	12	12	1	10	3	5	3	8
5	"Teardrops"	8	5	5	3	8	8	8	3
6	"Life Again"	1	8	10	8	10	12	12	12

=== Heat 4 ===
The fourth heat took place on 22 February 2025 at the Malmö Arena in Malmö. A total of 9,123,856 votes were cast using 562,798 devices, with SEK 362,752 collected for Radiohjälpen.

R/O	Artist	Song	Round 1			Round 2			Result
R/O	Artist	Song	Votes	Points	Place	Votes	Total votes	Place	Result
1	Andreas Lundstedt	"Vicious"	925,304	48	3	597,985	1,523,289	3	Out
2	Ella Tiritiello	"Bara du är där"	967,458	46	4	634,115	1,601,573	2	Final qual.
3	Tennessee Tears	"Yours"	773,258	36	5	436,047	1,209,305	4	Out
4	KAJ	"Bara bada bastu"	1,238,511	76	2	954,961	2,193,472	1	Final
5	AmenA	"Do Good Be Better"	629,574	10	6	333,799	963,373	5	Out
6	Måns Zelmerlöw	"Revolution"	1,632,844	96	1	—N/a			Final

Round 1 detailed televoting results
R/O	Song	Age groups							Tel.
R/O	Song	3‍–‍9	10‍–‍15	16‍–‍29	30‍–‍44	45‍–‍59	60‍–‍74	75+	Tel.
1	"Vicious"	5	5	5	5	8	10	5	5
2	"Bara du är där"	10	8	8	8	3	3	3	3
3	"Yours"	3	3	1	3	5	5	8	8
4	"Bara bada bastu"	8	10	10	10	10	8	10	10
5	"Do Good Be Better"	1	1	3	1	1	1	1	1
6	"Revolution"	12	12	12	12	12	12	12	12

=== Heat 5 ===
The fifth heat took place on 1 March 2025 at the Husqvarna Garden in Jönköping. A total of 7,997,463 votes were cast using 517,435 devices, with SEK 509,661 collected for Radiohjälpen.

R/O	Artist	Song	Round 1			Round 2			Result
R/O	Artist	Song	Votes	Points	Place	Votes	Total votes	Place	Result
1	Arvingarna	"Ring Baby Ring"	680,012	20	5	320,987	1,000,999	4	Out
2	Arwin	"This Dream of Mine"	1,006,048	58	4	552,450	1,558,498	2	Final qual.
3	Saga Ludvigsson	"Hate You So Much"	1,106,111	80	1	—N/a			Final
4	Victoria Silvstedt	"Love It!"	575,878	16	6	258,921	834,799	5	Out
5	Vilhelm Buchaus	"I'm Yours"	948,581	72	2	606,022	1,554,603	3	Out
6	Scarlet	"Sweet n' Psycho"	1,117,434	66	3	825,019	1,942,453	1	Final

Round 1 detailed televoting results
R/O	Song	Age groups							Tel.
R/O	Song	3‍–‍9	10‍–‍15	16‍–‍29	30‍–‍44	45‍–‍59	60‍–‍74	75+	Tel.
1	"Ring Baby Ring"	3	3	3	3	1	1	3	3
2	"This Dream of Mine"	12	10	5	5	5	8	8	5
3	"Hate You So Much"	8	12	10	10	10	12	10	8
4	"Love It!"	1	1	1	1	3	3	5	1
5	"I'm Yours"	5	5	12	8	8	10	12	12
6	"Sweet n' Psycho"	10	8	8	12	12	5	1	10

==== Final qualification ====
At the end of the fifth heat, a final qualification round took place consisting of the third-placing songs of each heat. The two most voted songs qualified for the final; the age group system was not used for this vote, but the results from the heats were added to it to determine the result of the final qualification. More specifically, for the heat points, the total number of votes for each song in each show was divided by the total number of voters (devices) in each show. Then 1,000 points were distributed amongst the songs based on those ratios. The song with the most points immediately advanced to the final. Once the voting had ended, an additional 800 points were distributed among the four remaining entries, based on how viewers had voted during the final qualification round. A total of 2,852,755 votes were cast using 403,642 devices, with SEK 204,303 collected for Radiohjälpen.

Code	Artist	Song	Heat				Final qual.		Total	Place	Result
Code	Artist	Song	Votes	V/V	Points	Place	Votes	Points	Total	Place	Result
11	Meira Omar	"Hush Hush"	1,716,377	3.25	210	2	1,087,480	306	516	1	Final
12	Kaliffa	"Salute"	1,685,036	3.06	197	3	540,096	150	347	3	Out
13	Dolly Style	"Yihaa"	1,658,290	3.34	215	1	—N/a				Final
14	Ella Tiritiello	"Bara du är där"	1,601,573	2.85	184	5	693,518	195	379	2	Out
15	Arwin	"This Dream of Mine"	1,558,498	3.01	194	4	531,661	149	343	4	Out

=== Final ===
The final took place on 8 March 2025 at the Strawberry Arena in Stockholm. A total of 26,072,328 votes were cast using 1,152,754 devices, with SEK 1,589,515 collected for Radiohjälpen. SVT Play also provided a stream of the final with English commentary by William Lee Adams and Bella Qvist.

R/O	Artist	Song	Juries	Public	Total	Place
1	John Lundvik	"Voice of the Silent"	49	25	74	6
2	Dolly Style	"Yihaa"	48	27	75	5
3	Greczula	"Believe Me"	47	56	103	3
4	Klara Hammarström	"On and On and On"	34	43	77	4
5	Scarlet	"Sweet n' Psycho"	31	33	64	7
6	Erik Segerstedt	"Show Me What Love Is"	24	27	51	9
7	Maja Ivarsson	"Kamikaze Life"	2	30	32	11
8	Meira Omar	"Hush Hush"	26	24	50	10
9	Måns Zelmerlöw	"Revolution"	76	81	157	2
10	Saga Ludvigsson	"Hate You So Much"	17	10	27	12
11	Annika Wickihalder	"Life Again"	36	18	54	8
12	KAJ	"Bara bada bastu"	74	90	164	1

Detailed international jury votes
R/O	Song	Lithuania	Italy	Switzerland	Ireland	France	Norway	Greece	Serbia	Total
R/O	Song	Lithuania	Italy	Switzerland	Ireland	France	Norway	Greece	Serbia	Total
1	"Voice of the Silent"	8	7	8	5	6	5	4	6	49
2	"Yihaa"	10	10	4	6	1	6	8	3	48
3	"Believe Me"	3	8	7	4	7	3	5	10	47
4	"On and On and On"		1	3	3	8	8	7	4	34
5	"Sweet n' Psycho"	6	4		2	4	7		8	31
6	"Show Me What Love Is"	5	2	1	8	2	2	2	2	24
7	"Kamikaze Life"	2								2
8	"Hush Hush"			6	10	3	4	3		26
9	"Revolution"	7	6	12	7	12	10	10	12	76
10	"Hate You So Much"	1	3	10			1	1	1	17
11	"Life Again"	12	5	2	1	5		6	5	36
12	"Bara bada bastu"	4	12	5	12	10	12	12	7	74
International jury spokespersons
Lithuania – None (Note: Vaidotas Valiukevičius was supposed to announce the points from the Lithuanian jury, but connection with him was lost and a technical glitch caused the Irish spokesperson Neil Doherty to briefly appear; host Edvin Törnblom read out the Lithuanian points instead.); Italy – Mariangela Borneo; Switzerland – Sandra Studer; Ireland – Neil Doherty; France – Alexandra Redde-Amiel; Norway – Mads Tørklep; Greece – Alexandra Pascalidou; Serbia – None (Note: Princ was supposed to announce the points from the Serbian jury, but audio connection with him was lost; hosts Edvin Törnblom and Keyyo read out the points instead. Princ was still seen trying to connect to the broadcast.)

Detailed televoting results
R/O	Song	Votes	Age groups							Tel.	Total
R/O	Song	Votes	3‍–‍9	10‍–‍15	16‍–‍29	30‍–‍44	45‍–‍59	60‍–‍74	75+	Tel.	Total
1	"Voice of the Silent"	1,578,564	2	2	1	2	3	5	7	3	25
2	"Yihaa"	2,011,149	10	7	4	5				1	27
3	"Believe Me"	2,696,753	3	5	10	8	8	8	6	8	56
4	"On and On and On"	2,461,721	8	8	7	6	7	2	3	2	43
5	"Sweet n' Psycho"	1,943,638	6	4	2	7	6	3		5	33
6	"Show Me What Love Is"	1,615,974	1	1	3	1	4	6	5	6	27
7	"Kamikaze Life"	1,435,634				3	5	7	8	7	30
8	"Hush Hush"	1,901,356	5	6	6	4	2		1		24
9	"Revolution"	3,278,385	7	10	8	10	12	12	12	10	81
10	"Hate You So Much"	1,472,693	4	3				1	2		10
11	"Life Again"	1,370,687			5		1	4	4	4	18
12	"Bara bada bastu"	4,305,774	12	12	12	12	10	10	10	12	90
