= Kaliffa =

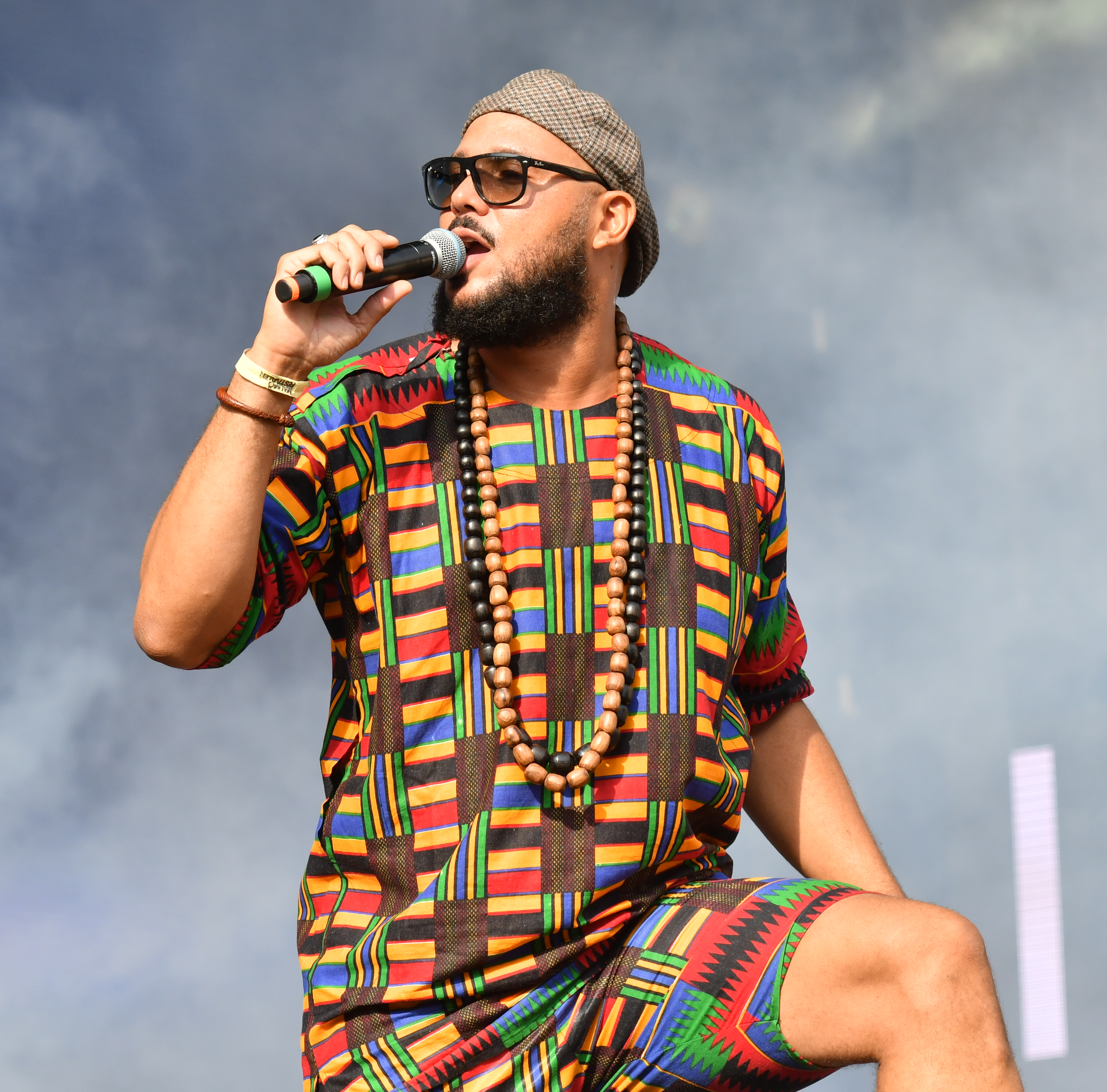
- Kaliffa in 2018

Background information
- Birth name: Kaliffa Olle Karlsson
- Born: 20 December 1979 (age 45)
- Origin: Tyresö, Sweden
- Instrument: Vocals
- Member of: Hoffmaestro & Chraa

Kaliffa Olle Karlsson (born 20 December 1979), better known as Kaliffa, is a Swedish singer. In 2017, he released the music single "Helt seriöst". He performed the song "Salute" in Melodifestivalen 2025.

He is also a member of the band Hoffmaestro & Chraa.

== Discography ==
=== Singles ===
Title	Year	Peak chart positions	Album
Title	Year	SWE	Album
"Helt seriöst"	2017	2	Non-album singles
"Salute"	2025	29	Non-album singles
