= Life Again =

Single by Annika Wickihalder
- Released: 14 February 2025
- Length: 3:01
- Label: Jubel
- Songwriters: Annika Wickihalder; Herman Gardarfve; Patrik Jean
- Producer: Herman Gardarfve

Annika Wickihalder singles chronology
"Stockholm" (2025)	"Life Again" (2025)

"Life Again" is a song by Swedish singer Annika Wickihalder, released as a single on 14 February 2025. It was performed in Melodifestivalen 2025, where it qualified for the final and finished 8th.

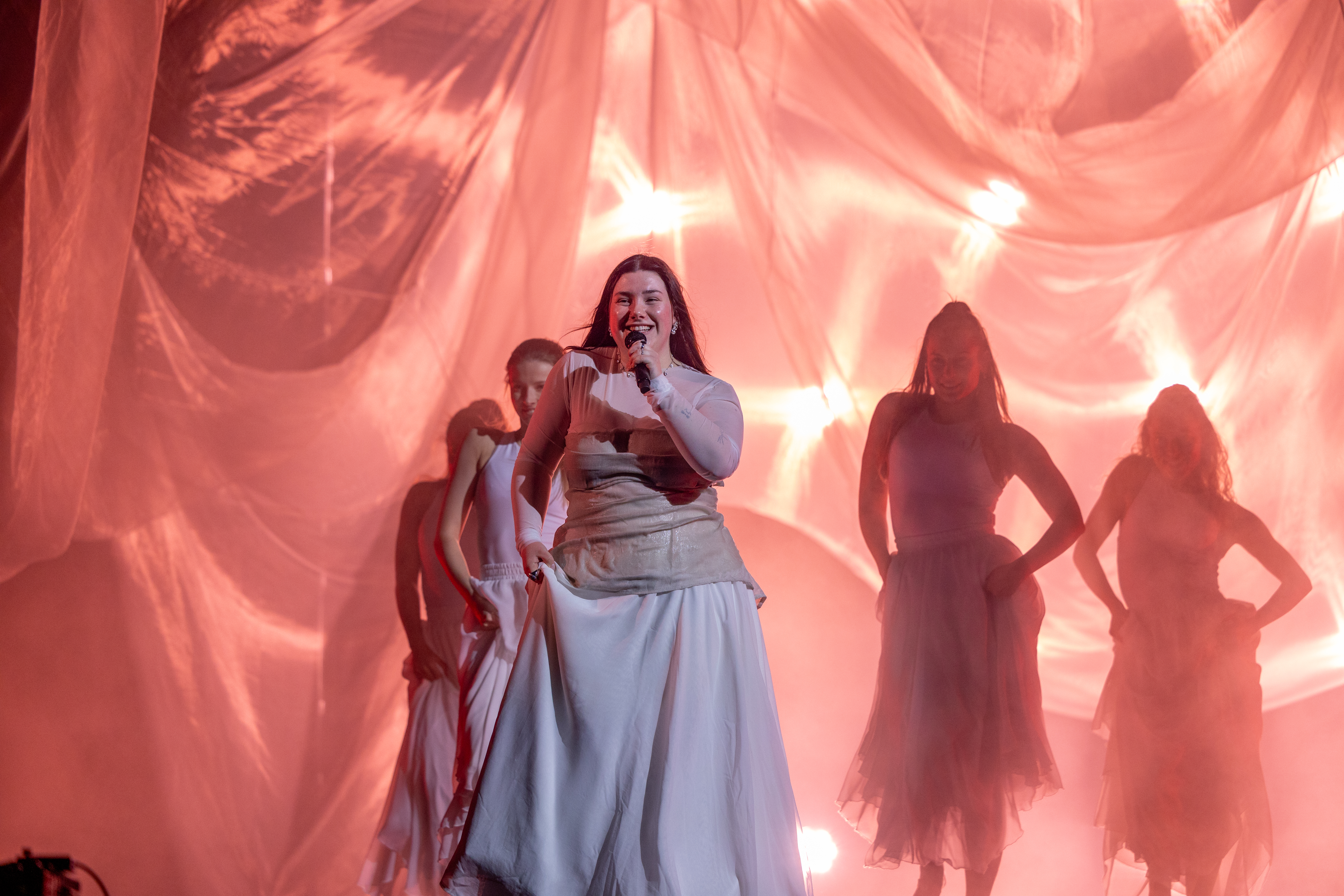
Wickihalder performing "Life Again"

== Charts ==
Chart performance for "Life Again"
Chart (2025)	Peak position
Sweden (Sverigetopplistan)	20
