= Saga Ludvigsson =

Swedish singer

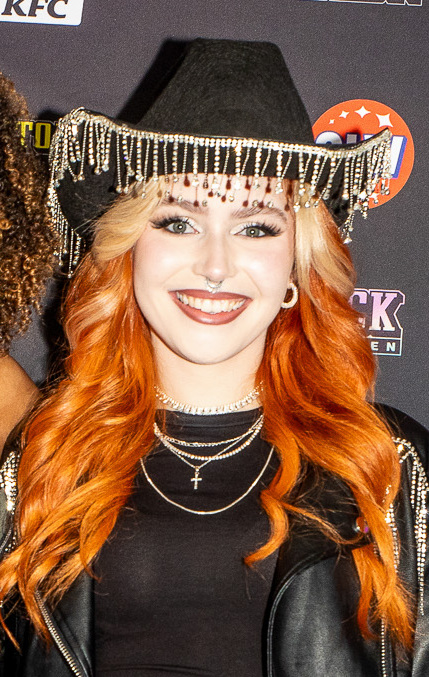
- Saga in 2024

Background information
- Born: Saga Alice Ludvigsson; 3 February 2006 (age 20); Örby, Sweden
- Genres: Pop
- Instrument: Vocals
- Years active: 2019–present
- Label: Ninetone

Saga Alice Ludvigsson (born 3 February 2006) is a Swedish singer.

== Biography ==
Ludvigsson had her breakthrough in the early half of 2019, when she participated in that year's edition of the TV show Talang, the Swedish version of the Got Talent franchise, where she made it all the way to the final.

Her first single "Don't Ever Be the Same" was released on January 3, 2020. Shortly afterwards, the local newspaper Markbladet named her the 2019 Marks Resident of the Year. In autumn 2020, she signed a contract with Ninetone Records. She released a number of singles on this label in 2021 and 2022.

In the spring of 2023, she auditioned for the nineteenth season of the TV show Idol, where she managed to become one of the participants in the top 12. She and Cimberly Wanyonyi went on to the program's final, where she placed second.

Ludvigsson participated in Melodifestivalen 2025 with the song Hate You So Much, which was written together with Herman Gardarfve and Lisa Desmond. On 8 March 2025, she placed 12th in the contest's final.

Ludvigsson participated in Melodifestivalen 2026 with the song "Ain't Today", which qualified from Heat 3 to the final on 7 March 2026. She again placed 12th in the final.

== Discography ==
=== Singles ===
- "Don't Ever Be the Same" (2020)
- "Calling" (2021)
- "One Shot" (2021)
- "Why Don't You" (2021)
- "Empty Space" (2021)
- "Only One" (2021)
- "Cry Anymore" (2021)
- "Show Me Lights" (2021)
- "Tell Me Lies" (2022)
- "Lost" (2022)
- "Hercules" (2024)
- "Country Boy" (2025)

=== Charting singles ===
Title	Year	Peak chart positions	Album
Title	Year	SWE	Album
"Hate You So Much"	2025	8	Non-album singles
"Ain't Today"	2026	6	Non-album singles
