= AmenA =

Swedish actor

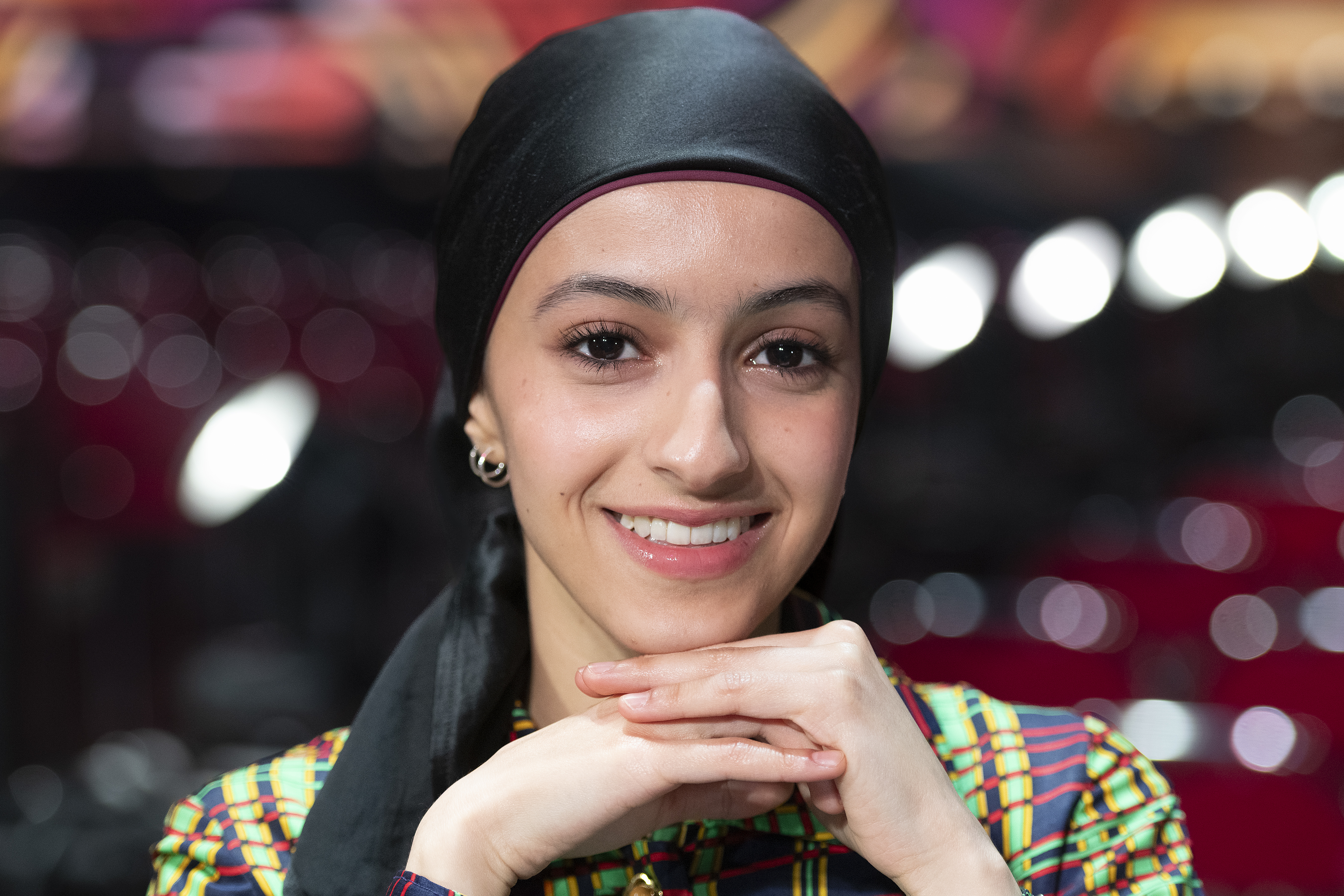
- AmenA at Melodifestivalen 2025

Background information
- Born: Amena Alsameai; 1 June 2001 (age 25); Yemen

Amena Alsameai (born 2 June 2001), better known as AmenA, is a Swedish-Yemeni singer and songwriter. She came to Sweden from Yemen as a refugee in 2019, where she started residing in Vimmerby. She participated in Idol 2021, where she placed ninth. After that she started writing her own music and released an album called “Guidebook” with nine tracks. https://ingrv.es/guidebook-qsw-h She also participated in Melodifestivalen 2025 with the song "Do Good Be Better"

== Discography ==
=== Singles ===
Title	Year	Peak chart positions	Album
Title	Year	SWE	Album
"Do Good Be Better"	2025	63	Non-album singles
