= Hush Hush (Meira Omar song) =

Single by Meira Omar
- Released: 31 January 2025
- Length: 2:53
- Label: Emperial
- Songwriters: Anderz Wrethov; Dino Medanhodzic; Laurell Barker; Meira Omar
- Producer: Dino Medanhodzic

Meira Omar singles chronology
"Dive" (2024)	"Hush Hush" (2025)	"Meri Jaan" (2025)

"Hush Hush" is a song by Swedish singer Meira Omar, released as a single on 31 January 2025. It was performed in Melodifestivalen 2025.

In Melodifestivalen 2025, the song finished third in heat 1 and advanced to the final qualification round, where it got 2nd and qualified to the final held in the 8th of March. It was performed as the eighth song in the final, where it got 26 points from the jury and 24 from the public, finishing in 10th place with 50 points.

On July 11, 2025 a 'sped up' version of the song was released following the release of her third single "Meri Jaan".

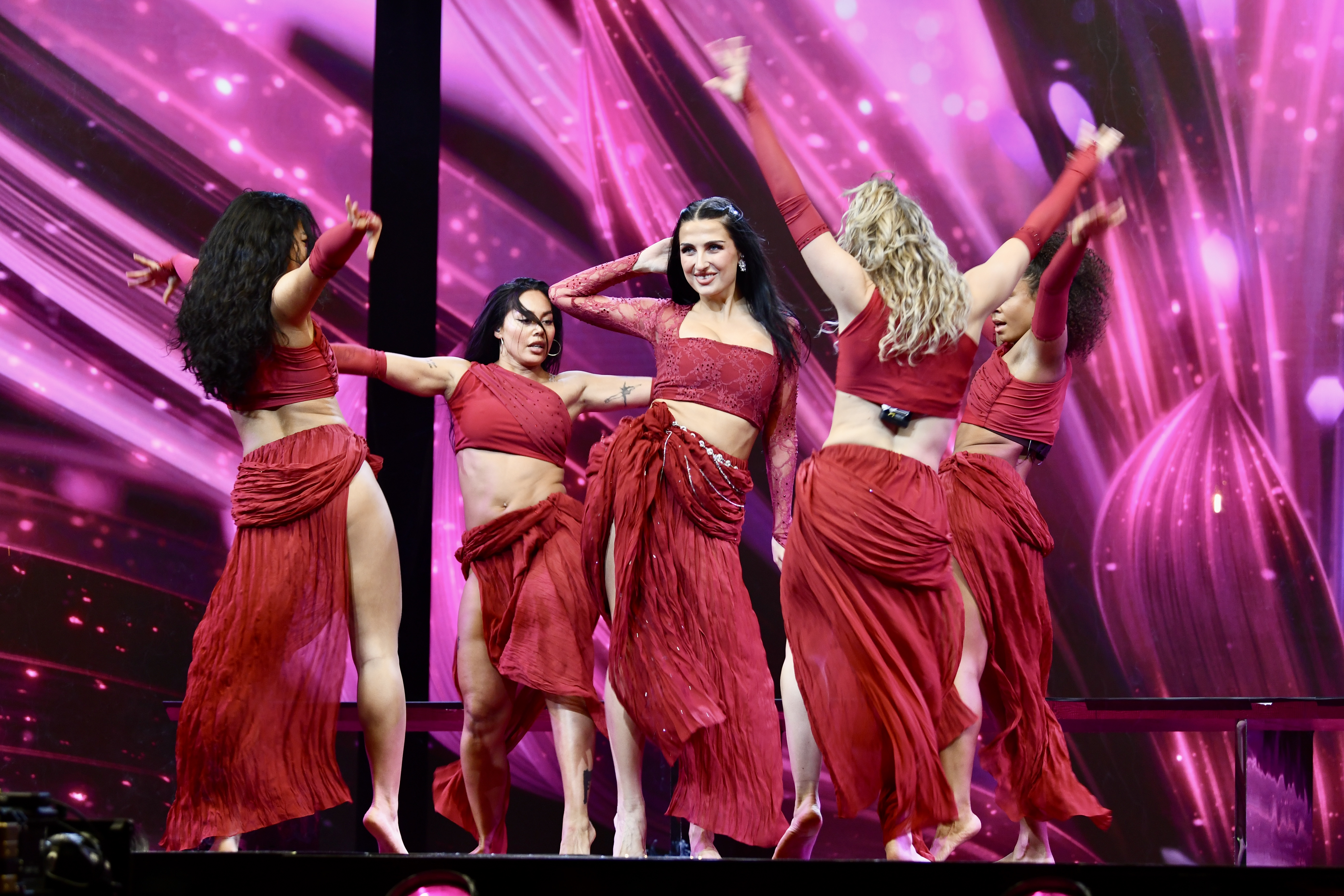
Omar performing "Hush Hush"

== Charts ==
=== Weekly charts ===
Weekly chart performance for "Hush Hush"
Chart (2025)	Peak position
Sweden (Sverigetopplistan)	3

=== Year-end charts ===
Year-end chart performance for "Hush Hush"
Chart (2025)	Position
Sweden (Sverigetopplistan)	41
