= Hate You So Much =

2025 single by Saga Ludvigsson

Single by Saga Ludvigsson
- Released: 28 February 2025
- Length: 2:36
- Label: Polydor Sweden
- Songwriters: Herman Gardarfve; Lisa Desmond; Saga Ludvigsson
- Producer: Herman Gardarfve

Saga Ludvigsson singles chronology
"Country Boy" (2025)	"Hate You So Much" (2025)

"Hate You So Much" is a song by Swedish singer Saga Ludvigsson, released as a single on 28 February 2025. It was performed in Melodifestivalen 2025. The song qualified to the finals, where it finished 12th and last.

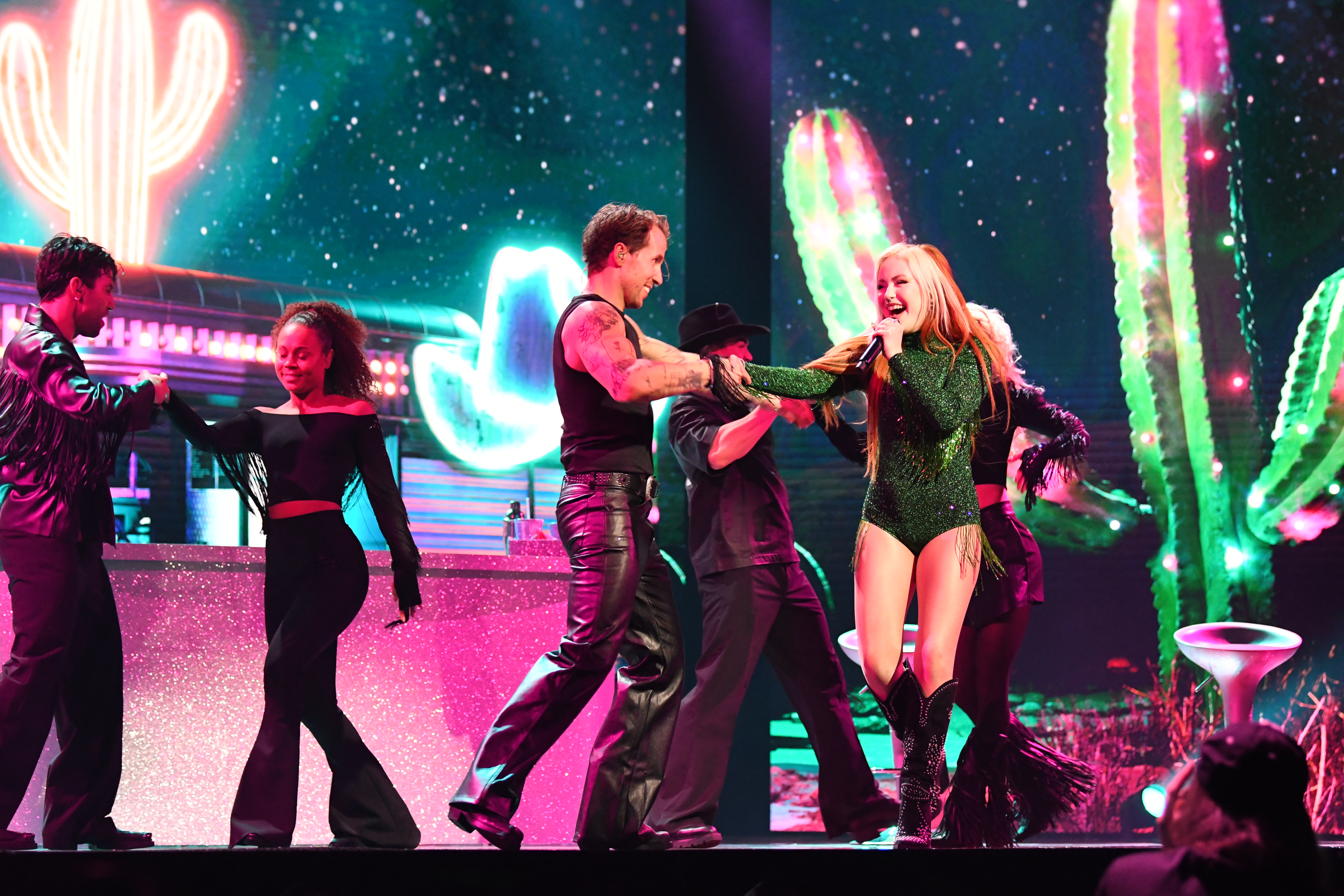
Ludvigsson performing "Hate You So Much"

== Charts ==
Chart performance for "Hate You So Much"
Chart (2025)	Peak position
Sweden (Sverigetopplistan)	8
