= Birkir Blær =

Icelandic singer (born 2000)

Birkir Blær Óðinsson (born 29 March 2000) is an Icelandic singer. On 10 December 2021, he won Swedish Idol 2021 at the Avicii Arena having resided in Sweden since November 2020.

== Discography ==
=== Singles ===
List of singles
Title	Year	Peak chart positions	Album
Title	Year	SWE	Album
"Weightless"	2021	74	Non-album single
