= Arwin (singer) =

Swedish actor

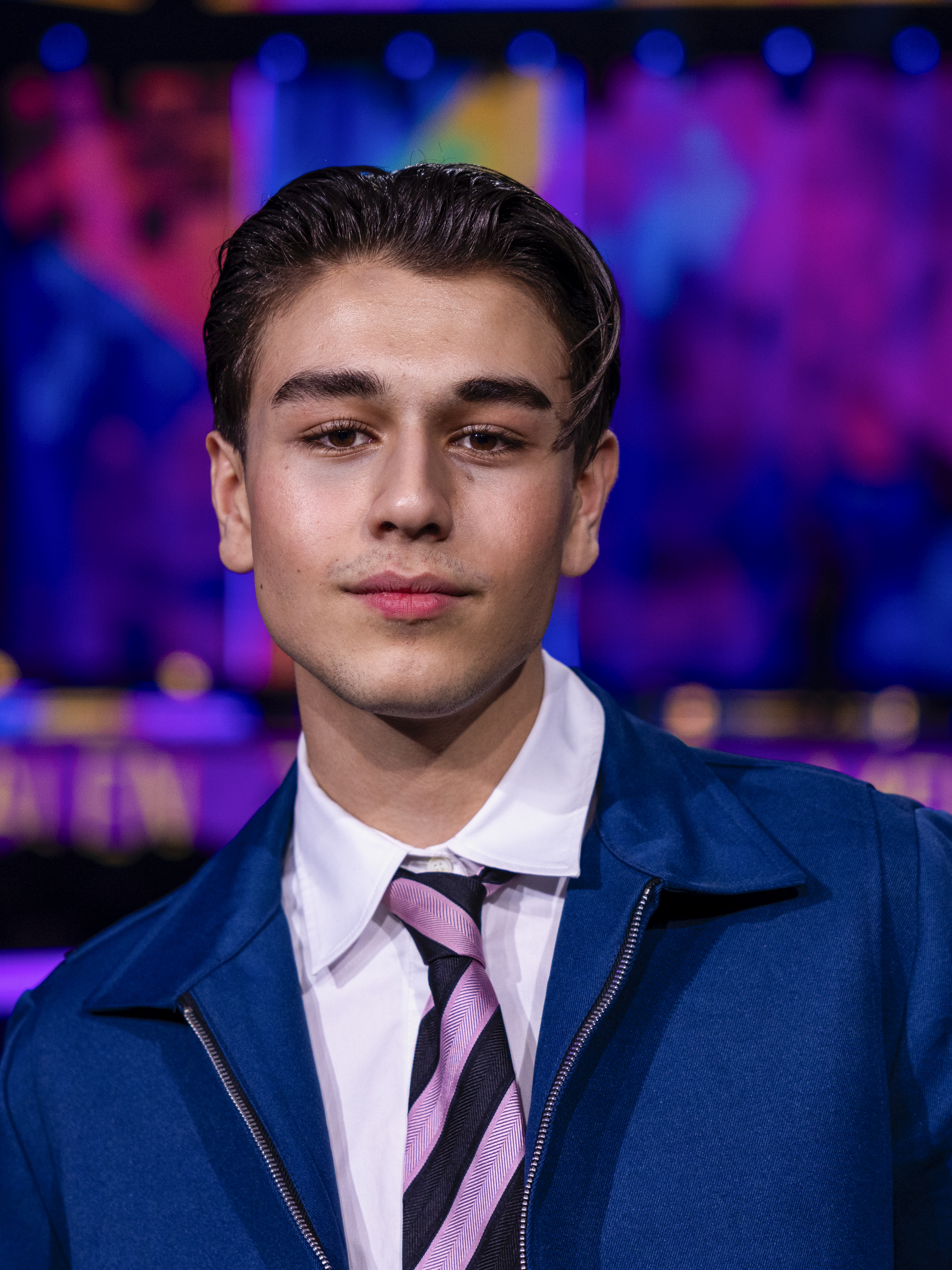
- Arwin in 2026

Background information
- Born: Arwin Saman Ismail Osman; 29 December 2007 (age 18); Vega, Sweden
- Musical career
- Genres: Pop
- Years active: 2021–present
- Label: Emperial

Arwin Saman Ismail Osman (born 29 December 2007), known mononymously as Arwin, is a Swedish actor and singer. He has had roles in TV-series like Ture Sventon och Bermudatriangelns hemlighet, which was broadcast on TV4, and in the teen series Ryktet on SVT.

== Career ==
=== Melodifestivalen ===
Arwin participated in Melodifestivalen 2025 with the song "This Dream of Mine". He also participated the year after in Melodifestivalen 2026 with the song "Glitter".

== Discography ==
=== Singles ===
| Title | Year | Peak chart positions | Album |
| Title | Year | SWE | Album |
|---|---|---|---|
| "This Dream of Mine" | 2025 | 29 | Non-album singles |
| "Glitter" | 2026 | 12 | Non-album singles |
