= Yihaa =

2025 single by Dolly Style

Single by Dolly Style
- Released: 14 February 2025
- Length: 2:56
- Label: Universal
- Songwriters: Caroline Aronsson; David Lindgren Zacharias; Herman Gardarfve; Melanie Wehbe; Mikaela Samuelsson; Patrik Jean
- Producer: Herman Gardarfve

Dolly Style singles chronology
"Have a Dolly Xmas" (2024)	"Yihaa" (2025)	"POM POM" (2025)

"Yihaa" is a song by Swedish girl group Dolly Style, released as a single on 14 February 2025. It was performed in Melodifestivalen 2025, where it finished 5th.

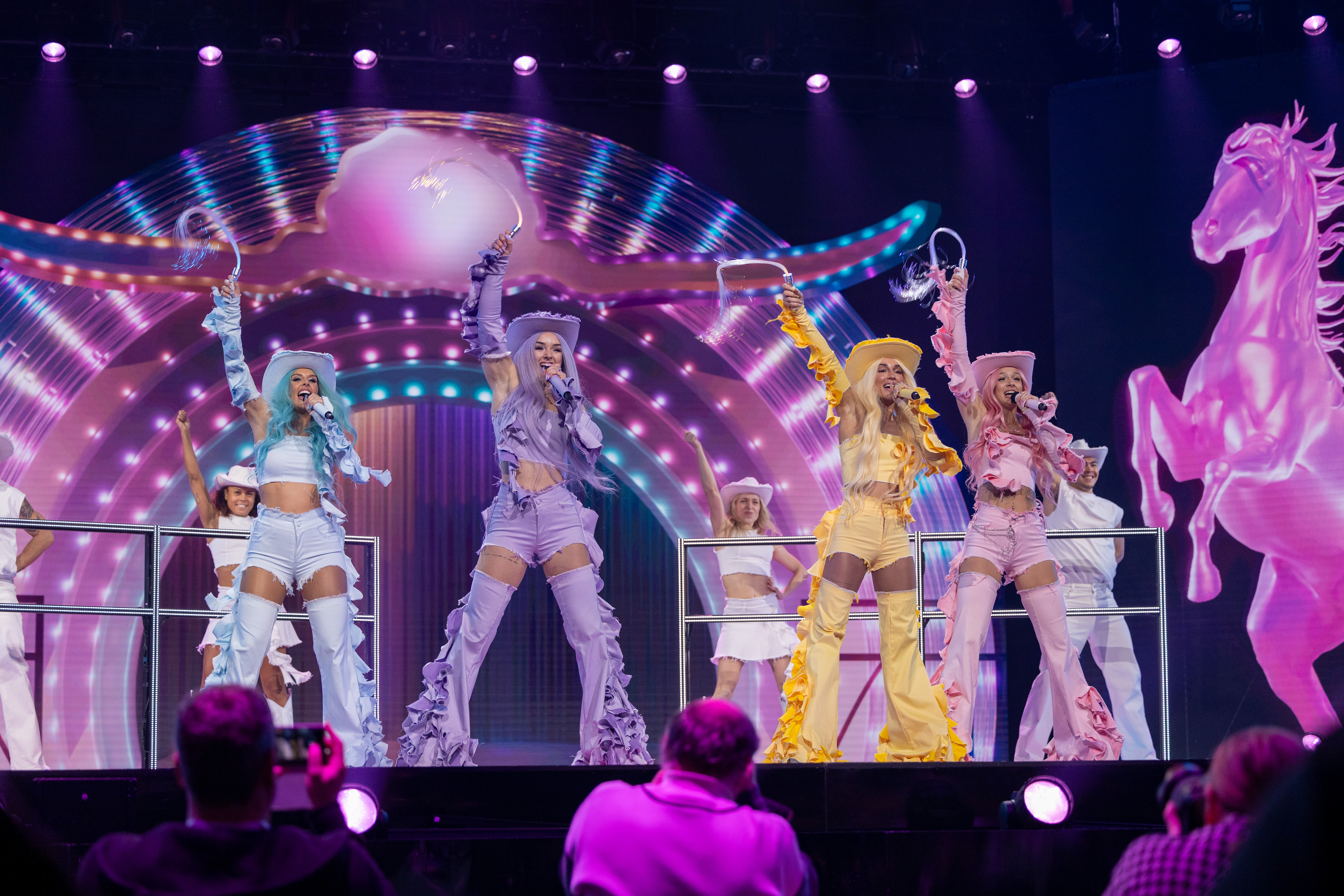
Dolly Style performing "Yihaa"

== Charts ==
=== Weekly charts ===
Weekly chart performance for "Yihaa"
Chart (2025)	Peak position
Sweden (Sverigetopplistan)	2

=== Year-end charts ===
Year-end chart performance for "Yihaa"
Chart (2025)	Position
Sweden (Sverigetopplistan)	10
