= Nomi Tales =

Swedish singer

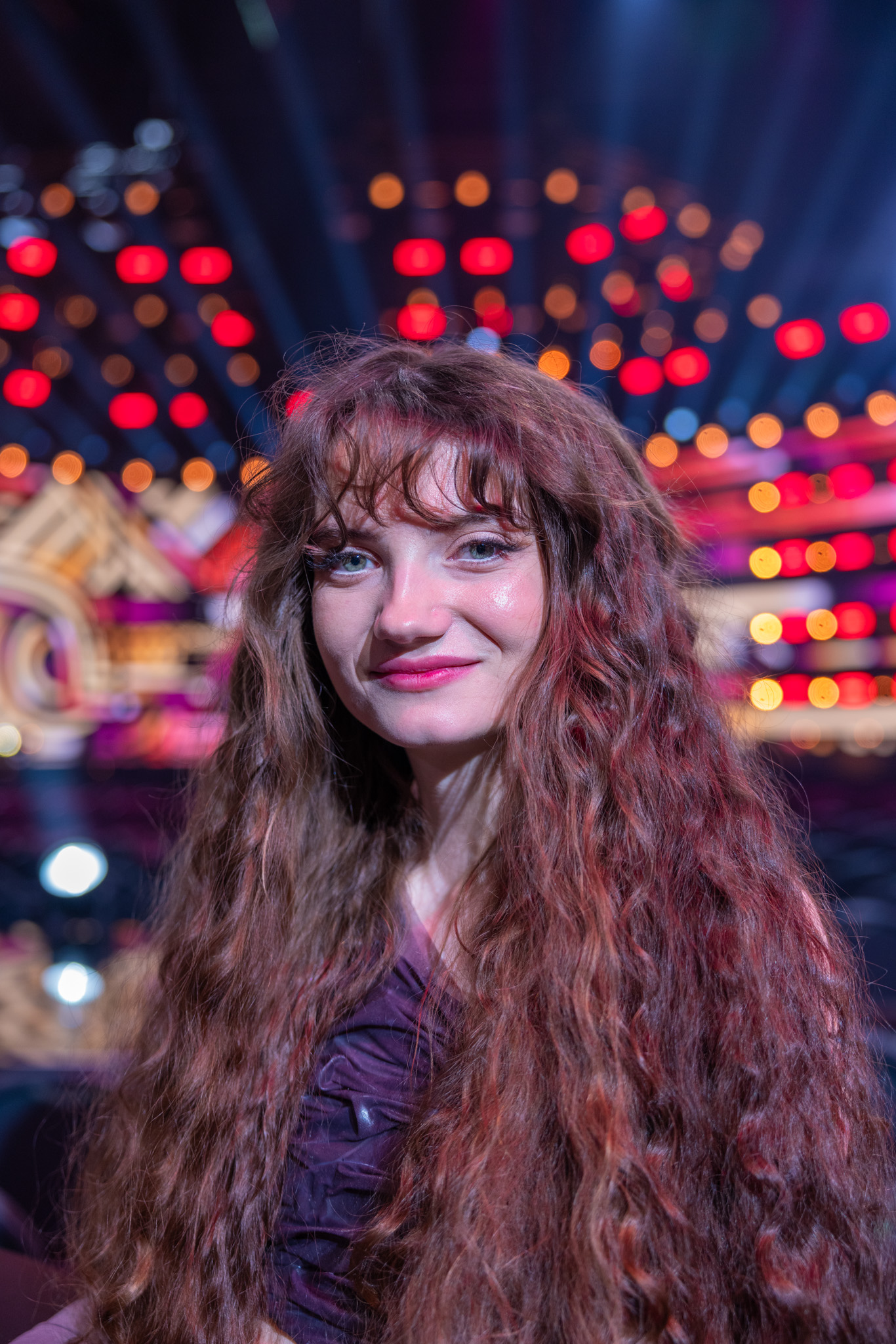
- Nomi Tales at Melodifestivalen 2025

Background information
- Born: Nomi Vanessa Nicolina Bontegard; 28 December 1996 (age 29); Skara
- Genres: Pop
- Labels: Star Stable Entertainment, Star Stable Music, Freebird Entertainment AB

Nomi Vanessa Nicolina Bontegard (born 28 December 1996), better known as Nomi Tales, is a Swedish singer and songwriter. She participated in Melodifestivalen 2025 with ”Funniest Thing". Her song ”Fire” is the lead track to the animated series Star Stable: Mistfall.

== Discography ==
=== Singles ===
Title	Year	Peak chart positions	Album
Title	Year	SWE	Album
"Funniest Thing"	2025	25	Non-album singles
