= Voice of the Silent =

Single by John Lundvik
- Released: 31 January 2025
- Length: 2:49
- Label: Warner
- Songwriters: Jimmy Jansson; John Lundvik; Peter Boström; Thomas G:son
- Producers: Jimmy Jansson; Peter Boström; Thomas G:son

John Lundvik singles chronology
"Solid Ground" (2024)	"Voice of the Silent" (2025)

"Voice of the Silent" is a song by Swedish singer John Lundvik, released as a single on 31 January 2025. It competed in Melodifestivalen 2025 and advanced to the final. On 8 March 2025 Lundvik performed the song in the final and placed sixth.

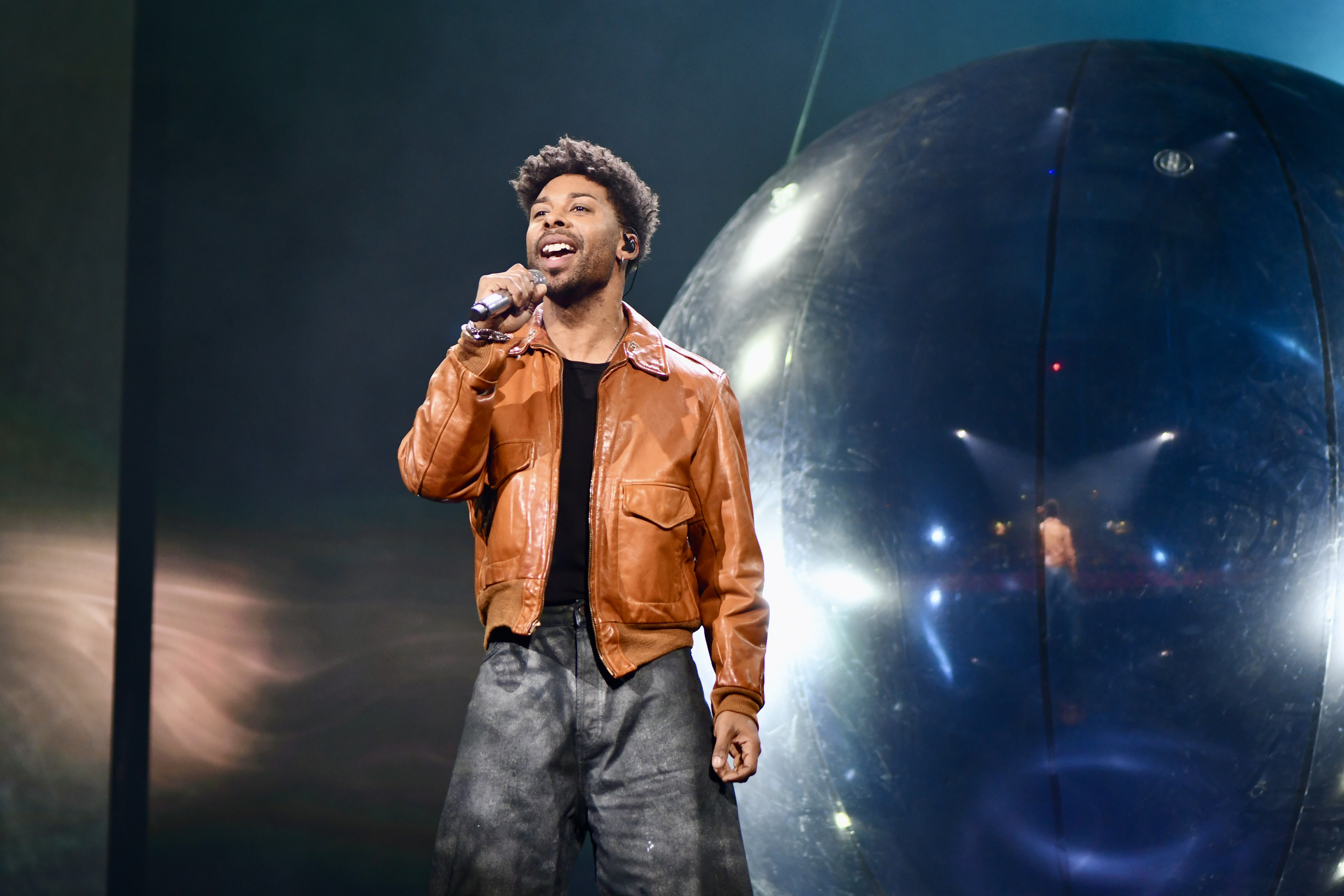
Lundvik performing "Voice of the Silent"

== Charts ==
Chart performance for "Voice of the Silent"
Chart (2025)	Peak position
Sweden (Sverigetopplistan)	13
