= Edvin Törnblom =

Swedish comedian and actor

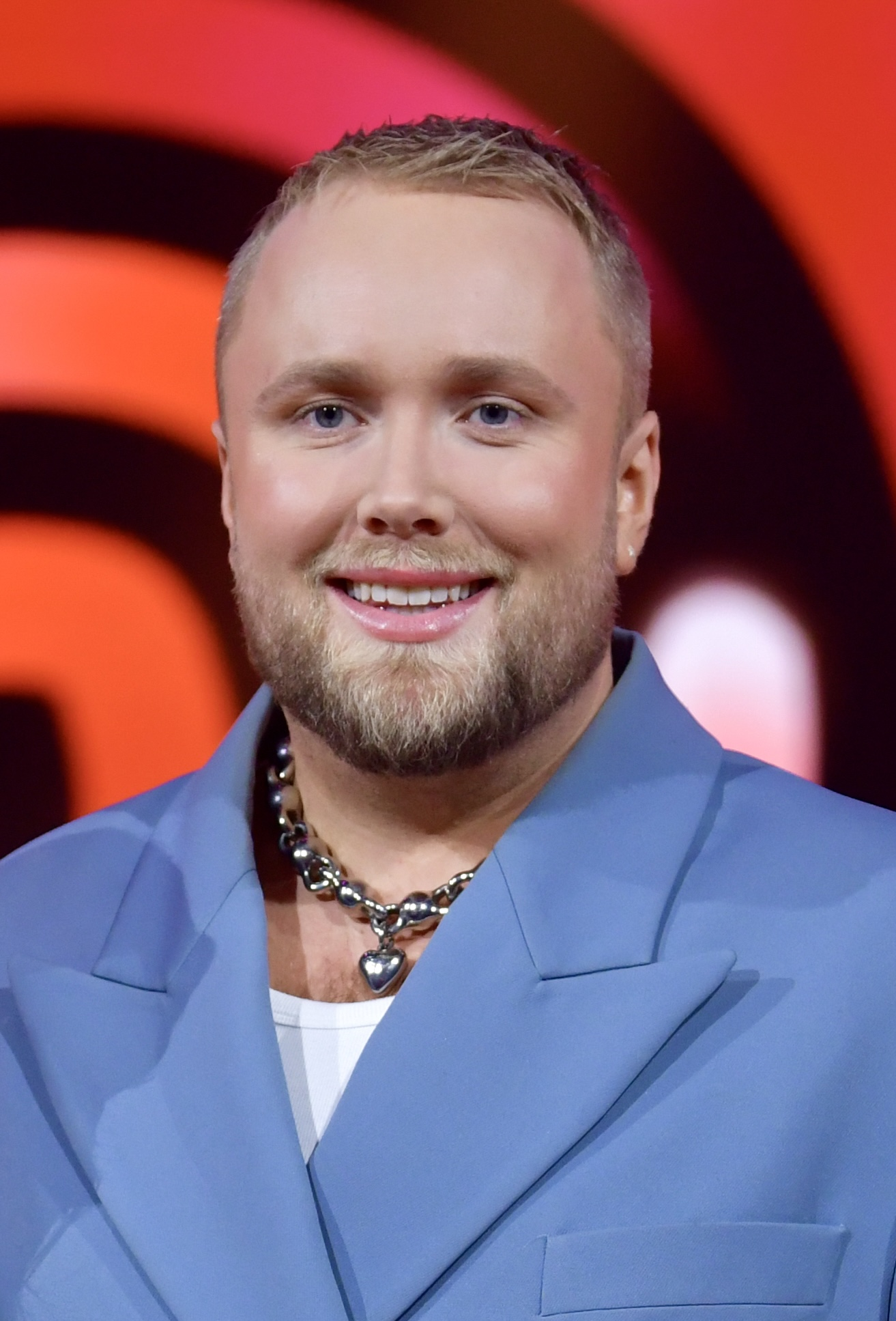
- Törnblom during Melodifestivalen 2025
- Born: Edvin Arne Valdemar Törnblom; 22 February 1996 (age 30); Nacka, Sweden

Edvin Arne Valdemar Törnblom (born 22 February 1996) is a Swedish comedian, television personality and actor. He has had roles in television series like Alla utom vi on Discovery+, and the film Göta kanal – Vinna eller försvinna released in 2022. In April 2022, Törnblom published the autobiographic book Bögen är lös.

On 7 November 2024, Sveriges Television announced that Törnblom would host Melodifestivalen 2025 alongside Keyyo.

In 2026, Törnblom became a panel member in the sixth season of Masked Singer Sverige.

== Discography ==
=== Singles ===
List of singles, with selected peak chart positions
| Title | Year | Peak chart positions | Album |
| Title | Year | SWE | Album |
|---|---|---|---|
| "Gårdsbög" | 2024 | 36 | Non-album singles |
| "Tänk om vi var gay" (with De Vet Du) | 2024 | 33 | Non-album singles |

== Bibliography ==
- 2022 - Bögen är lös, ISBN 9789137502199
