= Ella Tiritiello =

Swedish singer and actress

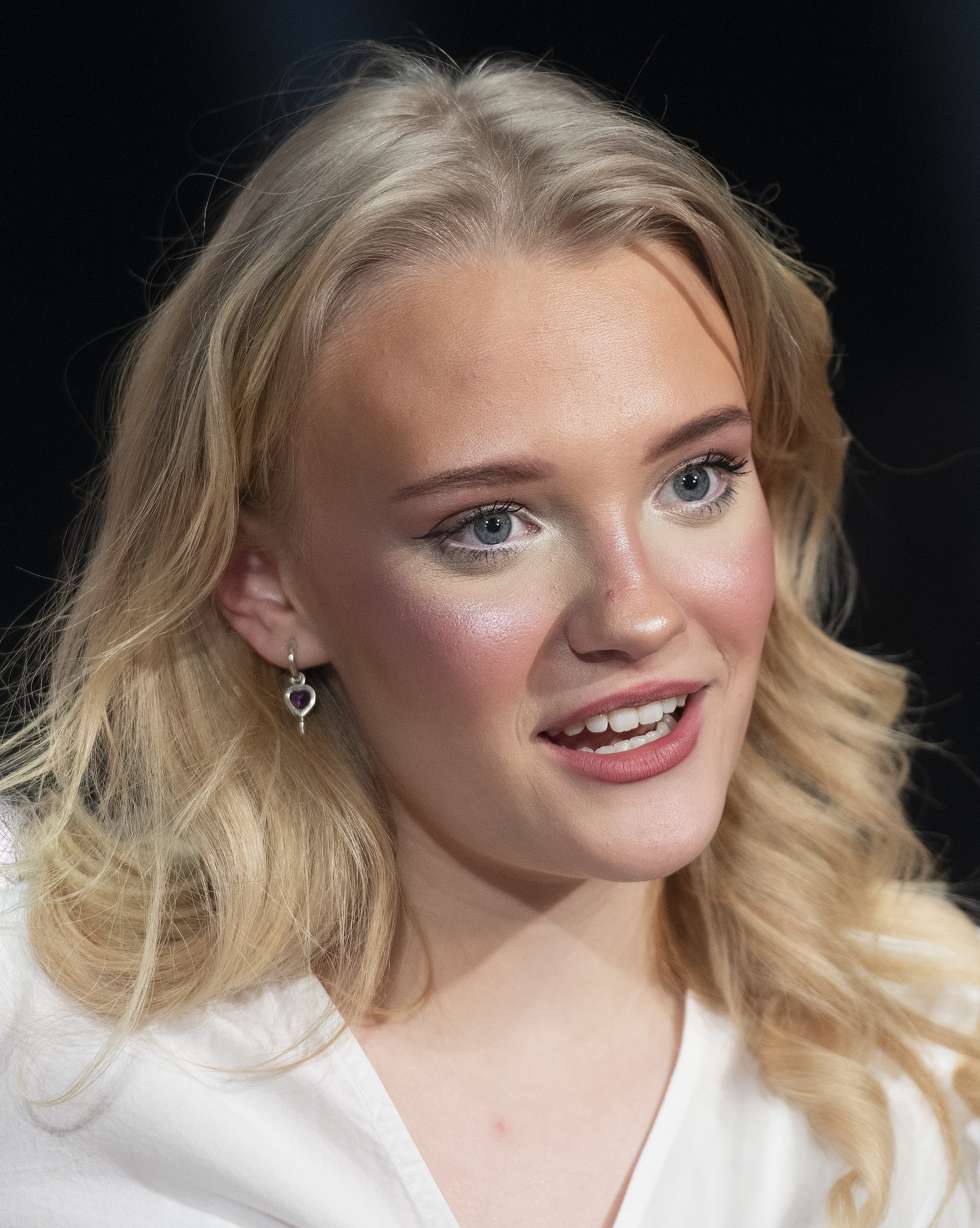
- Tiritiello in 2025

Background information
- Born: Ella Nellie Tiritiello; August 24, 2006 (age 19)
- Origin: Kristianstad, Sweden
- Years active: 2021–present

Ella Tiritiello (Swedish: [²ɛlːa ¹tɪrɪtɪˈɛlːʊ]) is a Swedish singer and actress.

== Career ==
Tiritiello performed a cover of the Avicii song "For a Better Day" alongside the Royal Stockholm Philharmonic Orchestra at the renaming ceremony of Avicii Arena in May 2021. She performed the cover with Zara Larsson at Together For a Brighter Day in December 2021.

She is known for portraying Marie Fredriksson in the movie Sommartider and for participating in Melodifestivalen 2025.

== Discography ==
=== Singles ===
Title	Year	Peak chart positions	Album
Title	Year	SWE	Album
"Bara du är där"	2025	9	Non-album single
