= Neil Doherty (radio presenter) =

Irish radio presenter and producer

Neil Doherty is an Irish radio presenter and producer, who has been employed by the National Irish broadcaster Raidió Teilifís Éireann (RTÉ) since 2010. He currently presents the weekend programme Saturday Sounds for RTÉ Radio 1 and since 2016 has been the Irish radio commentator for the Eurovision Song Contest, together with Zbyszek Zalinski. Doherty also previously stood in for Ronan Collins on RTÉ Radio 1 in 2020.

Doherty was a member of the Irish international jury in Melodifestivalen 2022, 2024 & 2025 and presented the jury's votes as the spokesperson.
