= Adrian Macéus =

Swedish artist and actor

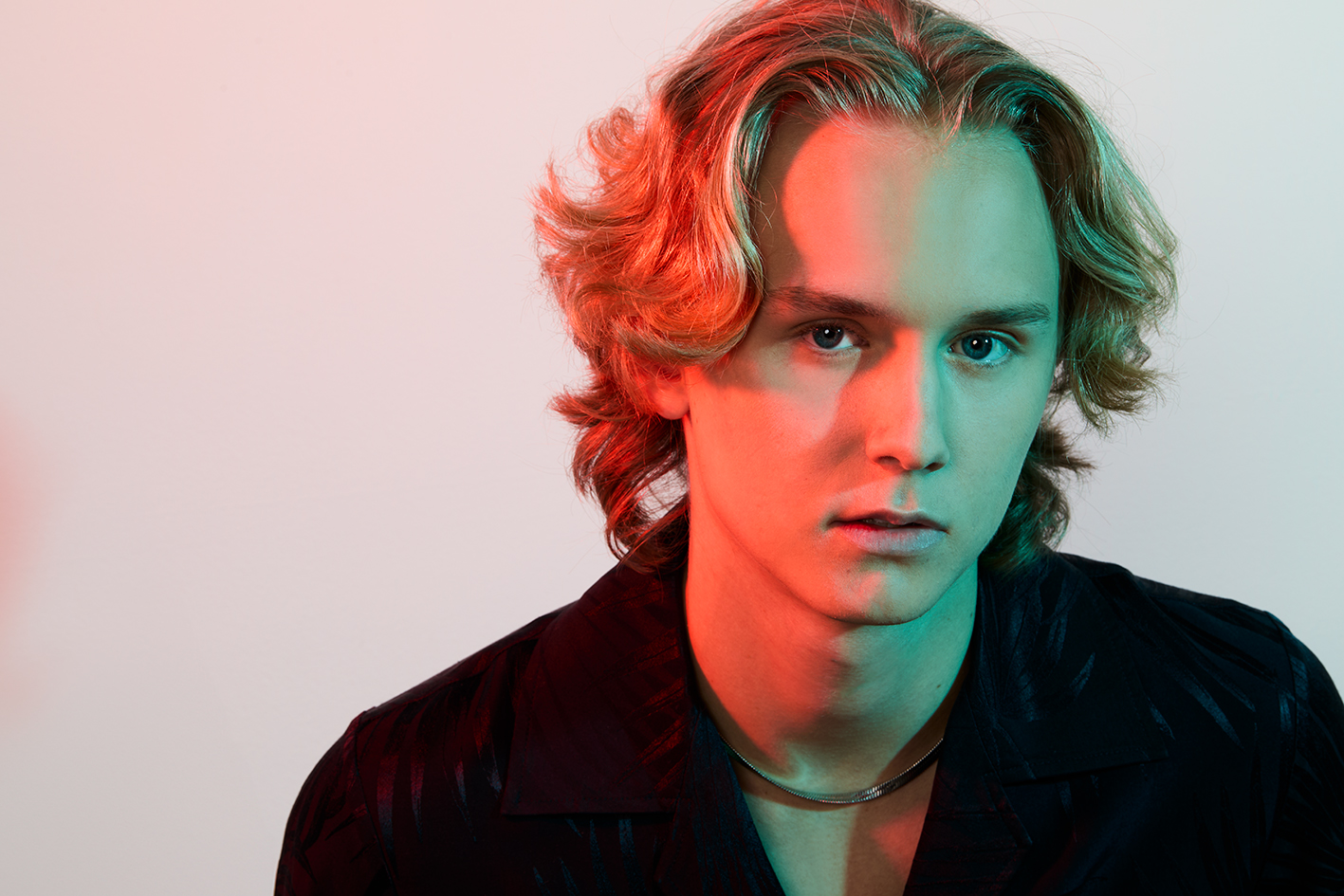
- Adrian Macéus

Background information
- Born: Adrian Antoni Macéus; 3 May 2005 (age 21); Stockholm, Sweden
- Genre: Pop
- Occupations: Singer and actor
- Instruments: Vocal, Guitar, Piano, Drums
- Years active: 2015-present
- Labels: WM Sweden, Universal Music AB, Freebird Entertainment AB
- Website: https://adrianmaceus.se

Adrian Antoni Macéus (born 3 May 2005) is a Swedish artist and actor.

== Biography ==
Adrian Macéus was on born 3 May 2005 in Stockholm. He is of Polish descent, having performed with the Polish Theatre Society in Sweden and taken part in multiple editions of the Polish Young Talents competition in Stochholm.

During the summer of 2016 Macéus was part of the ensemble of Parkteaterns play Trollflöjten 2.0 where he played one of Paminas little brothers. He had the lead role in the musical Billy Elliot in 2018 at Stockholms stadsteater. Preparing for the role he trained for dance at Base 23 – Stockholm dance Academy. In 2018, he was part of the ensemble for the musical Så som i himmelen at Oscarsteatern in Stockh olm, where he plays Gabriellas son.

He played Leo in the 2018 SVT Christmas calendar Storm på lugna gatan. He has also done dubbing acting, he dubbed the role of Miguel in the Swedish voice for the Pixar film Coco. Adrian did the Swedish voice as John Banks in Disneys Mary Poppins Returns.

in December 2018 Adrian Macéus released his debut single "How Are You Now" at Warner Music Sweden and Northbound Music Group that he himself written along with Kian Sang and Karl Ivert. He performed the song live in Bingolotto in TV4 on 2 December 2018 and became the third most popular artist that season.

Since 2019 he is the youngest ambassador representing the Swedish Anti Bullying foundation Friends. Through this role, he uses his platform to support children and young people facing difficulties, and to promote broader engagement in creating positive change.

Adrian Macéus makes a Swedish podcast targeting teenagers, Adrian & Klara — Tonårsliv, published at Spotify, Acast and YouTube.

During the autumn of 2020, Adrian Macéus entered a management cooperation with Maria Molin Ljunggren on Freebird Entertainment and Niklas Rune.

In 2021, Adrian Macéus features the main character Bert in TV4 and Cmore TV-series.

In 2025, Macéus competed in Melodifestivalen. He performed in the first heat with the song "Vår första gång" where he failed to qualify to the final.

== Awards and recognition ==
Adrian Macéus was appointed in the autumn of 2020 as My local hero of the newspaper Mitt I and their readers.

In November 2020, Adrian Macéus received the price Årets Nätängel children & youth by Mysafety AB in collaboration with BRIS.

== Family ==
Adrian Macéus is the son of the program manager and producer Johan Macéus and the author and journalist Karolina Palutko Macéus.

== Discography ==
=== Singles ===
Title	Year	Peak chart positions	Album
Title	Year	SWE	Album
"Vår första gång"	2025	46	Non-album singles
