= Light (Annika Wickihalder song) =

Single by Annika Wickihalder
- Released: 2 March 2024
- Length: 2:52
- Label: Jubel Artist Agency
- Songwriters: Annika Wickihalder; Herman Gardarfve; Linnea Gawell; Patrik Jean

Annika Wickihalder singles chronology
"Speed of Sound" (2023)	"Light" (2024)

"Light" is a song by Swedish singer Annika Wickihalder, released as a single on 2 March 2024. It was performed in Melodifestivalen 2024. The song is written by Herman Gardarfve, Linnea Gawell, Patrik Jean and the artist himself.

== Charts ==
Chart performance for "Light"
Chart (2024)	Peak position
Sweden (Sverigetopplistan)	17
