= Björn Holmgren =

Swedish singer

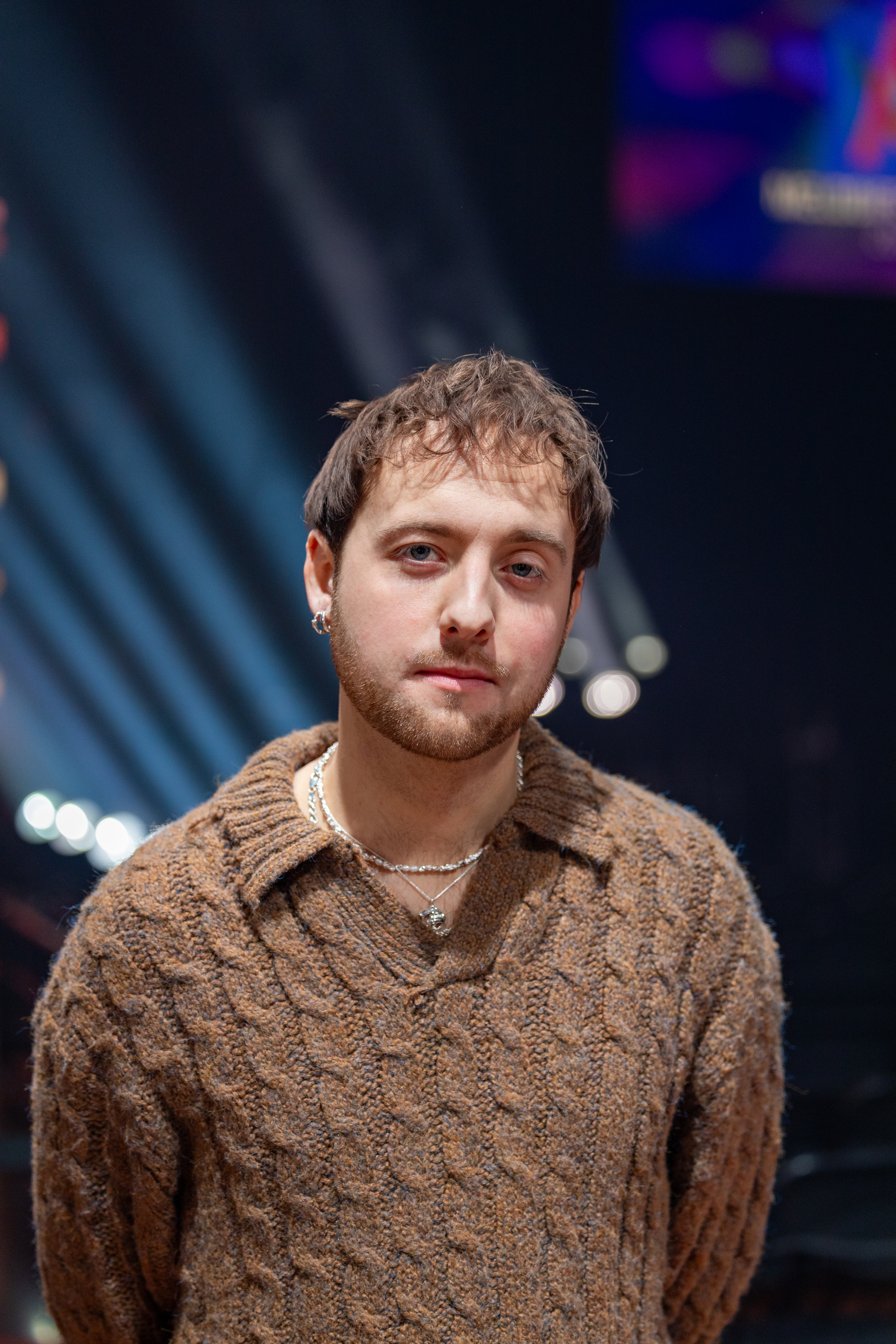
Holmgren in 2025

Björn Holmgren is a Swedish singer. In 2022, his music single ”Ut med allt” peaked at number one on Sverigetopplistan. Holmgren initially started his career on Tiktok. Holmgren also auditioned for Idol 2016. He participated in Melodifestivalen 2025. He performed in the third heat with the song "Rädda mig" where he failed to qualify to the final.

== Discography ==
=== Singles ===
List of singles
Title	Year	Peak chart positions	Album
Title	Year	SWE	Album
"Ut med allt"	2022	1	Non-album singles
"Haglar" (Spotify Studio It's Hits) (with Olivia Lobato)	2022	38	Non-album singles
"Vackert slut"	2023	— (Note: "Vackert slut" did not enter the Swedish Singellista Chart, but peaked at number 13 on the Swedish Heatseeker Chart.)	Non-album singles
"Symfoni" (with Jens Hult)	2023	— (Note: "Symfoni" did not enter the Swedish Singellista Chart, but peaked at number 10 on the Swedish Heatseeker Chart.)	Non-album singles
"Rädda mig"	2025	45	Non-album singles
