= Annika Wickihalder =

Swedish singer

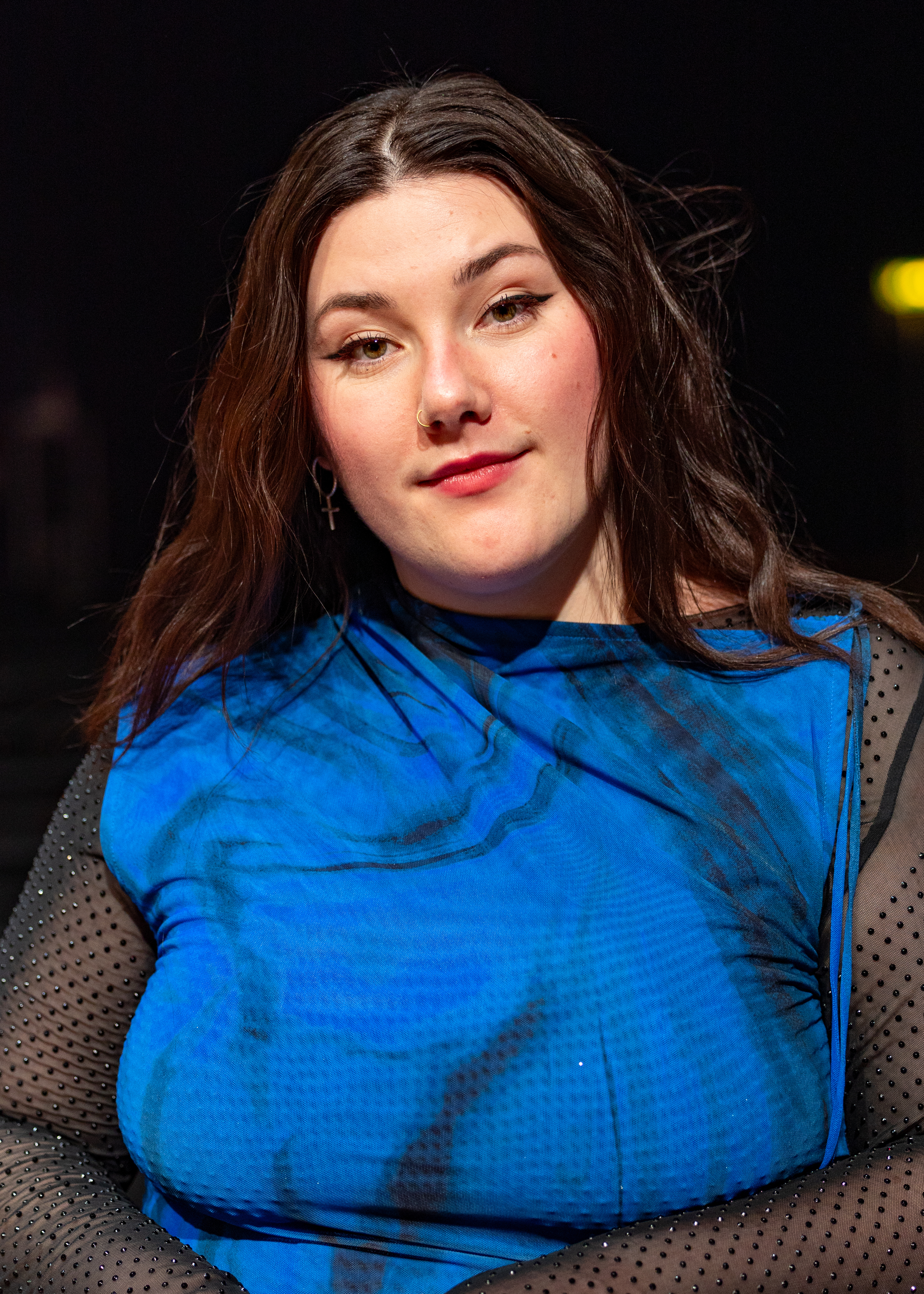
- Wickihalder in 2024

Background information
- Born: Annika Viktoria Wickihalder Pettersson; 25 January 2001 (age 25); Zurich, Switzerland
- Occupation: Singer
- Labels: Jubel Artist Agency

Annika Viktoria Wickihalder Pettersson (born 25 January 2001) is a Swiss-Swedish singer. She participarted in Idol 2021, placing third. She participated in Melodifestivalen 2024 with the song "Light"; having qualified from her heat for the run-off vote of 2 March 2024, she ultimately secured a spot in the final of 9 March 2024 where she placed eighth. Wickihalder participated in Melodifestivalen 2025 with the song "Life Again" and qualified directly to the final from heat three on 15 February 2025. She placed eighth again in the final on 8 March 2025.

== Discography ==
=== Singles ===
List of singles, with selected peak chart positions
Title	Year	Peak chart positions	Album
Title	Year	SWE	Album
"Light"	2024	17	Non-album singles
"Life Again"	2025	20	Non-album singles
