= Revolution (Måns Zelmerlöw song) =

Single by Måns Zelmerlöw
- B-side: "Broken"
- Released: 21 February 2025
- Length: 3:00
- Label: Warner
- Songwriters: David Lindgren Zacharias; Måns Zelmerlöw; Ola Svensson; Sebastian Atas
- Producers: David Lindgren Zacharias; Sebastian Atas

Måns Zelmerlöw singles chronology
| "Walk with Me / Chodź ze mną" (2024) | "Revolution" (2025) |

"Revolution" is a song by Swedish singer Måns Zelmerlöw, released as a single on 21 February 2025. It was written by Zelmerlöw, along with David Lindgren Zacharias, Ola Svensson and Sebastian Atas. It was performed in Melodifestivalen 2025.

== Background and composition ==
"Revolution" was written by Zelmerlöw with Sebastian Atas, David Lindgren Zacharias and Ola Svensson. Zelmerlöw considered participating in Melodifestivalen for a fourth time and discussed it with Lindgren Zacharias; the two contacted Atas to ask if he would help with production. Zelmerlöw and Svensson were both contestants on the second season of Idol but hadn't seen each other in six years before they met up for the songwriting session. "Revolution", which took around an hour to write, was originally written with the climate crisis in mind, but Zelmerlöw says its lyrics have taken on a new meaning in the context of the second Trump presidency. Off-stage background vocals on "Revolution" are provided by Lars Säfsund and Alexander Holmgren.

== Melodifestivalen 2025 ==
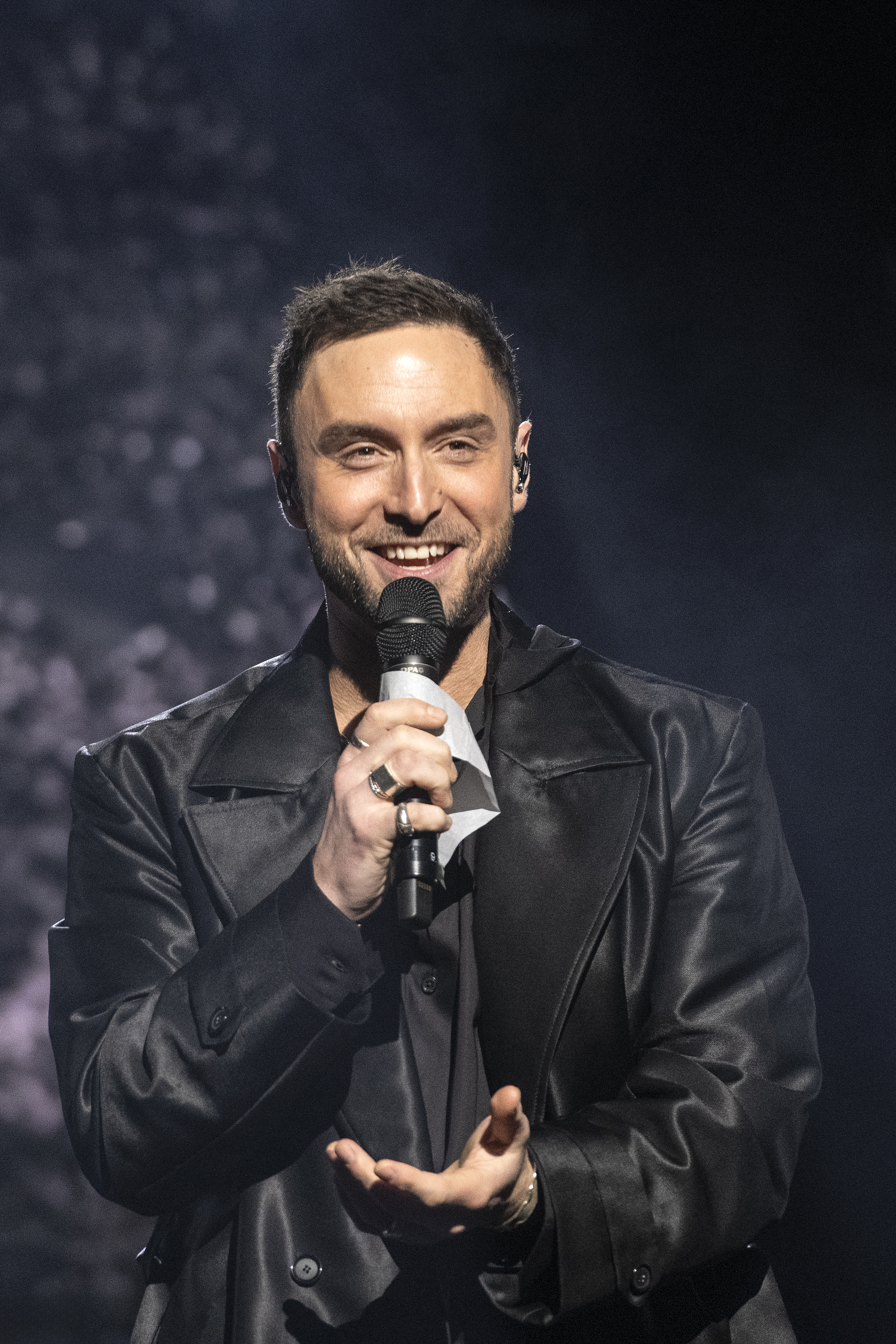
Zelmerlöw performing "Revolution"

Sweden's broadcaster for the Eurovision Song Contest, Sveriges Television (SVT), is organising a 30-entry competition, Melodifestivalen 2025, to select the country's entrant for the Eurovision Song Contest 2025. A total of 30 entries took part in the competition across five heats. Each heat consisted of six songs, with the top two songs directly qualifying for the final. Unlike in the previous edition, only the third-placing song proceeded to a final qualification round at the end of the fifth heat, which featured five songs instead of ten. The top two songs in the final qualification then progressed to the final, which comprised 12 songs. The winner of the final was determined by a 50/50 combination of votes from the public and an international jury.

On 26 November 2024, it was announced that Zelmerlöw would participate in Melodifestivalen 2025 with the song "Revolution". The song, which participated in the fourth round on 22 February 2025, went directly to the final. The song placed second overall, winning the jury vote and placing second with the televote.

== Charts ==
=== Weekly charts ===
Weekly chart performance for "Revolution"
| Chart (2025) | Peak position |
|---|---|
| Poland (Polish Airplay Top 100) | 52 |
| Sweden (Sverigetopplistan) | 3 |

=== Year-end charts ===
Year-end chart performance for "Revolution"
| Chart (2025) | Position |
|---|---|
| Sweden (Sverigetopplistan) | 79 |
