= Fredrik Lundman =

Swedish singer

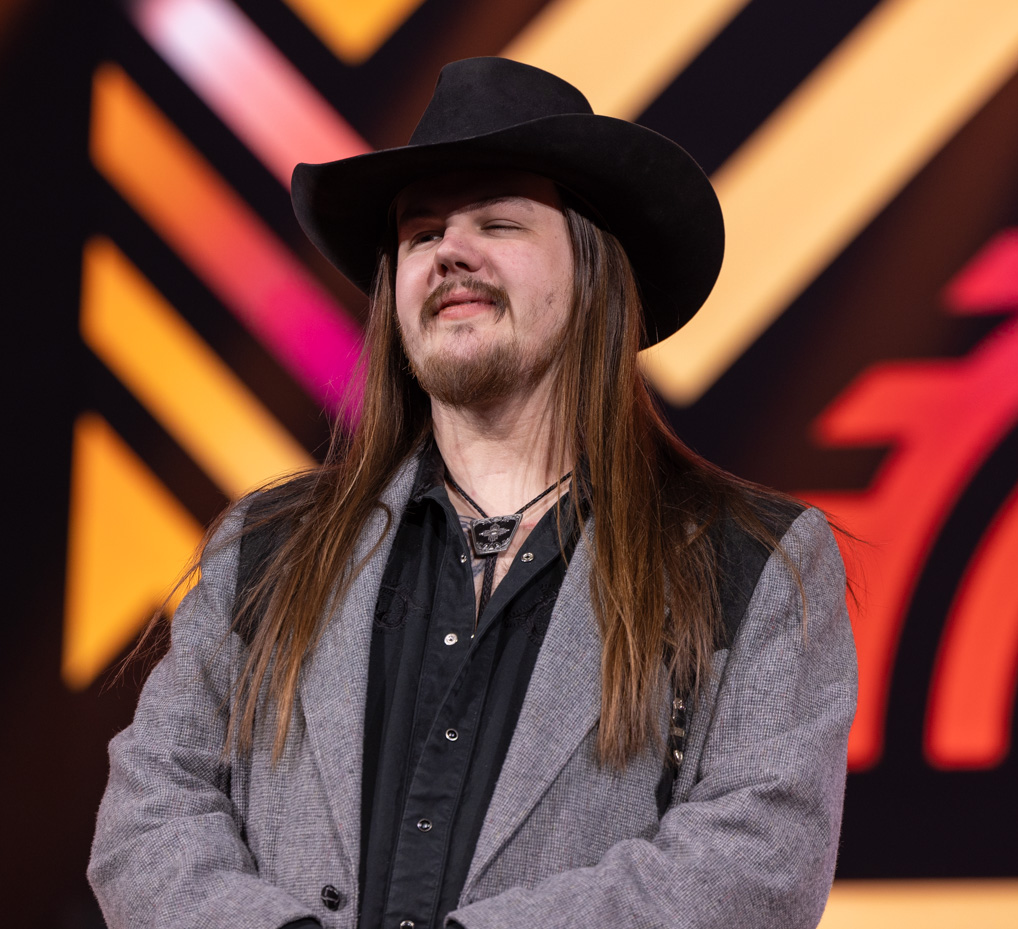
- Fredrik Lundman at Melodifestivalen 2025

Background information
- Born: 14 February 1992 (age 34); Piteå
- Genres: Country
- Labels: Tiny Vampire Records; Metronica

Fredrik Karl Olof Lundman (born 14 February 1992) is a Swedish songwriter and country singer. He auditioned for Talang 2011, as well as Idol 2011 both on TV4. Ten years later he again auditioned, this time for Idol 2021 this time he made it into the "Top 13" in the end placing fifth. He participated in Melodifestivalen 2025, with the song "The Heart of a Swedish Cowboy".

== Discography ==
=== Singles ===
Title	Year	Peak chart positions	Album
Title	Year	SWE	Album
"The Heart of a Swedish Cowboy"	2025	46	Non-album singles
