= Hoffmaestro & Chraa =

Swedish ska band

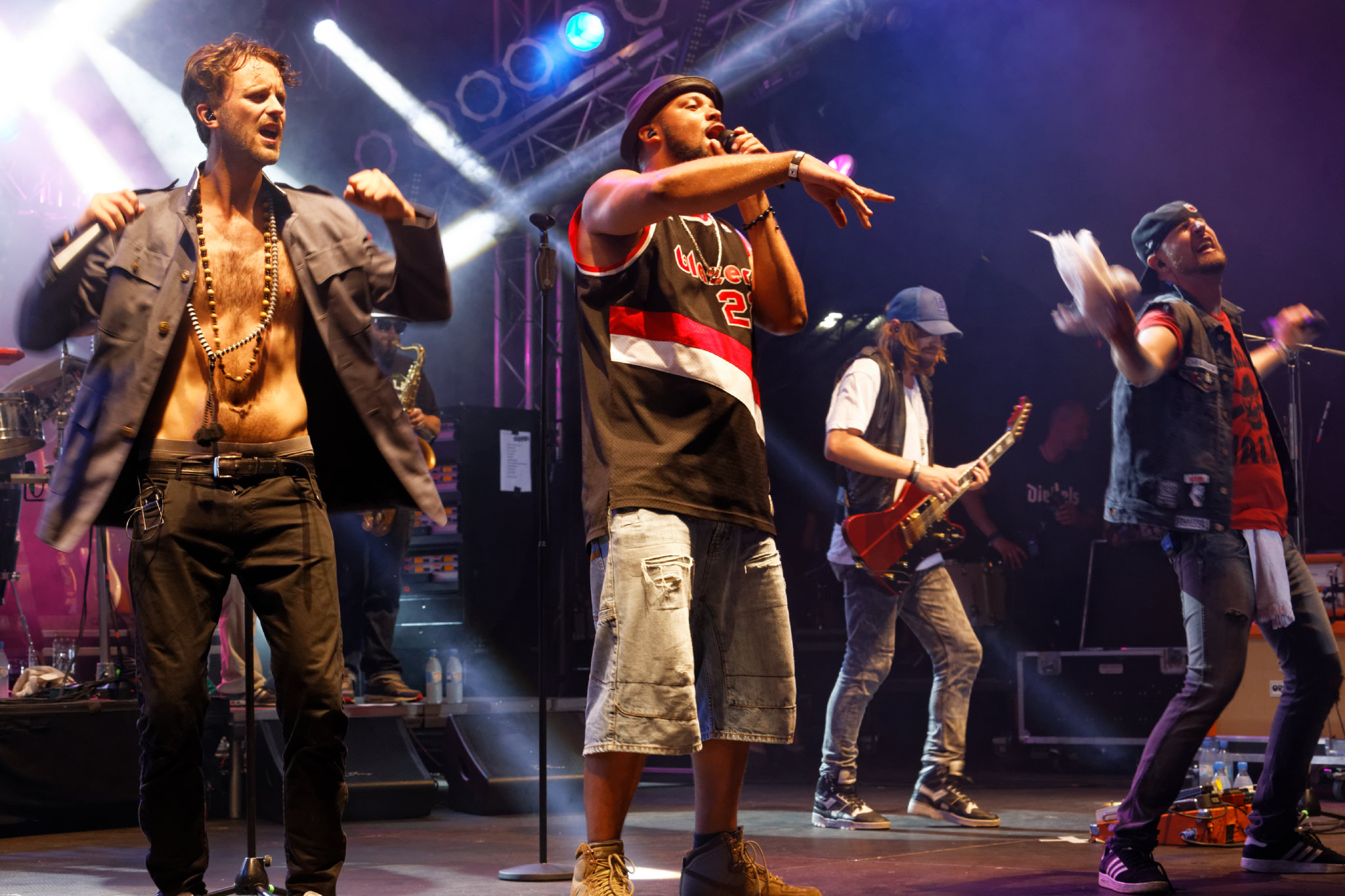

Background information
- Origin: Sweden
- Genre: Ska
- Years active: 2005–present
- Members: Jens Malmlöf; Karl-Uno Lindgren; John Lindgren; Johan Ekhé; Nils Tull; Jessica Olofsson; Harry Wallin; Thomas Eby; Hampus Lundgren; Kristian Harborg; Kaliffa Karlsson; Petter Linde
- Website: hoffmaestro.se/

Hoffmaestro & Chraa is a Swedish ska, electronic and alternative pop band. Their music is a mix of Ska with reggae, Techno, New Orleans-funk and Country.

Hoffmaestro is an example of the band that has built its reputation and a large fan base through touring rather than through media exposure. The band's breakthrough came with the film Stockholm Boogie in 2005. written, directed and soundtrack recorded by Hoffmaestro themselves, particularly with the theme song "Desperado". In subsequent years, they released two EP's and a full-length album The Storm on Warner Music. The band was nominated for a Grammy for the music video of "Young Dad" and for the song "Highway Man".

"Skank-a-tronic Punkadelica Tour" in 2010 resulted in a full-length album Skank-a-tronic punkadelica released via the band's own label Chraamofon on October 4, 2010.

They have, among other acts, played on many Swedish music festivals including Peace & Love. Their greatest influences are Funkadelic, Manu Chao, Dr. John, Guns N' Roses, Ska-P, Pakito, David Ruffin and Beastie Boys.

On 27 September 2019, they performed in Kungsträdgården in Stockholm during the international climate strikes.

== Discography ==
=== Albums ===
As Hoffmaestro

- 2014: Hoffmaestro

Track list:

1. Desperado - 4:10
2. Highway Man - 3:37
3. Seize the Day - 3:32
4. So Do You (Slimi Jimi) - 3:14
5. Dreams - 3:54
6. No Hay Banda - 4:10
7. Out of Luck - 3:54
8. Haters and Critics - 3:49
9. Wasteland - 4:28
10. Too Hype for the Radio (Dig It!?) - 2:42
11. The Storm - 4:15
12. Round it Goes (Live) - 4:59

As Hoffmaestro

- 2010: Skank-a-tronic Punkadelica

Track list:

1. Skank-a-tronic Punkadelica Intro – 0:22
2. Too Hype For The Radio – 2:42
3. Haters and Critics – 3:48
4. Round It Goes – 3:55
5. Lullaby – 5:04
6. Memories In Blue – 2:27
7. Ibradacadabra – 3:45
8. Skankin' Rave – 3:54
9. Siempre Palante – 3:28
10. Bubbelin Style – 3:06
11. Our Song – 5:06
12. Got Left – 3:30
13. Call It Off – 3:40
14. Eru Beng? – 3:10

As Hoffmaestro & Chraa

- 2008: The Storm

Track list:

1. Seize The Day – 3:35
2. Highway man – 3:50
3. The Storm – 4:13
4. Crimson Sky – 3:48
5. Desperado– 3:48
6. So Do You [Slimi Jimi Bubby Boy] – 3:19
7. I'm Not Leaving Now – 4:12
8. New Orleans – 4:20
9. Chraa Indian – 3:04
10. Young Dad – 3:34
11. My Shoes – 3:51
12. Words Come Easy – 3:52
13. We Be Them Boys – 11:05
14. Iko Iko [Mardi Chraa] – 7:32

=== Singles ===
As Hoffmaestro

- 2005: "I'm Not Leaving Now"
- 2006: "Young Dad"

As Hoffmaestro & Chraa

- 2007: "Desperado"
- 2009: "Ibracadabra"
- 2010: "Highway Man"
