= Keyyo =

Russian-born Swedish comedian

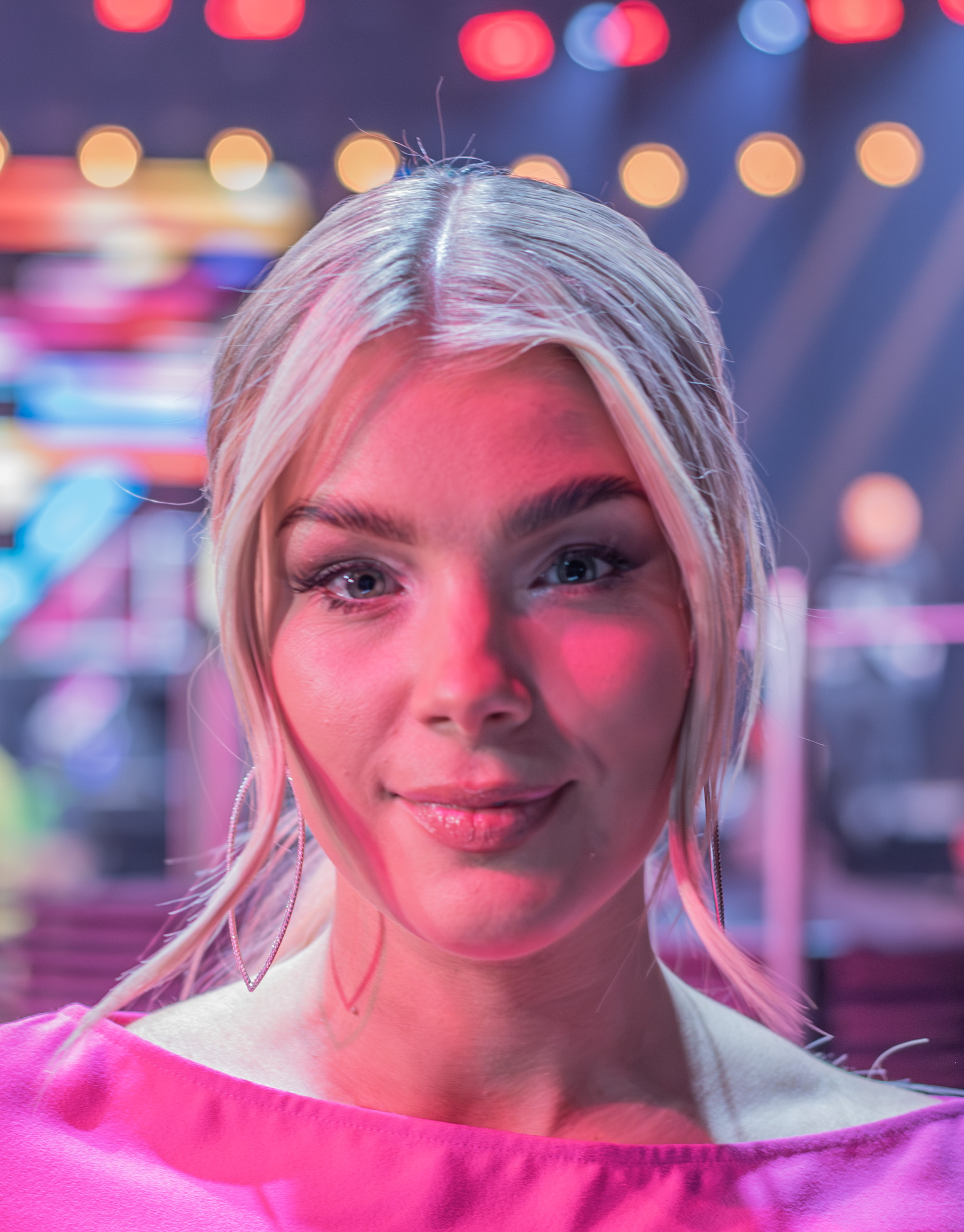
- Keyyo during Melodifestivalen 2025
- Born: Kristina Petrushina; 27 February 1997 (age 29); Omsk, Russia
- Occupations: Comedian, television presenter

Kristina Petrushina (Note: Russian: Кристина Петрушина) (born 27 February 1997), better known as Keyyo, is a Russian-born Swedish comedian, television presenter and former YouTuber.

== Career ==
She was born in Omsk, Russia and moved to Sweden at the age of nine, residing in Smedjebacken.

In 2014, Keyyo got her own comedy show on SVT Play called Keyyo & Co, the script to the show was written by herself and Sissela Benn. In 2015, Keyyo again had her own show on SVT Play where she tried on different summer jobs, called Ombytta roller med Keyyo.

Keyyo had the role of Irina in the SVT series Må underbart med Tiffany Persson, in 2016 with Anders Jansson playing the lead role.

In 2018, Keyyo and Carina Berg presented the gala Barncancergalan – Det svenska humorpriset. The same year she was a contestant on Fångarna på fortet, the Swedish version of Fort Boyard, on TV4.

Keyyo presented Talang in 2017 and 2018 which was broadcast on TV4 along with Pär Lernström. Since 2017, Keyyo presents Morgonpasset on Sveriges Radio.

In 2019, Keyyo along with Johan Rheborg travelled to Russia, which resulted in the travel show Keyyo med Rheborg i Ryssland, which was broadcast on SVT.

In 2020, Keyyo participated in the fourth season of Bäst i test, the Swedish version of Taskmaster.

On 7 November 2024, Sveriges Television announced that Keyyo would host Melodifestivalen 2025 alongside Edvin Törnblom.

On 17 May 2025, Keyyo was the spokesperson revealing Sweden's jury votes in the final of the Eurovision Song Contest 2025.

== Personal life ==
Keyyo has been dating the singer Greczula since 2025.
