= Kamikaze Life =

Single by Maja Ivarsson

from the EP Kamikaze Life
- Released: 31 January 2025
- Length: 3:01
- Label: Universal
- Songwriters: Andreas Lindbergh; Jimmy "Joker" Thörnfeldt; Joy Deb; Linnea Deb; Maja Ivarsson
- Producers: Andreas Lindbergh; Joy Deb

Maja Ivarsson singles chronology
"Tonight" (2012)	"Kamikaze Life" (2025)

"Kamikaze Life" is a song by Swedish singer Maja Ivarsson, released as a single on 31 January 2025. It was performed in Melodifestivalen 2025, where it qualified to the finals and finished 11th.

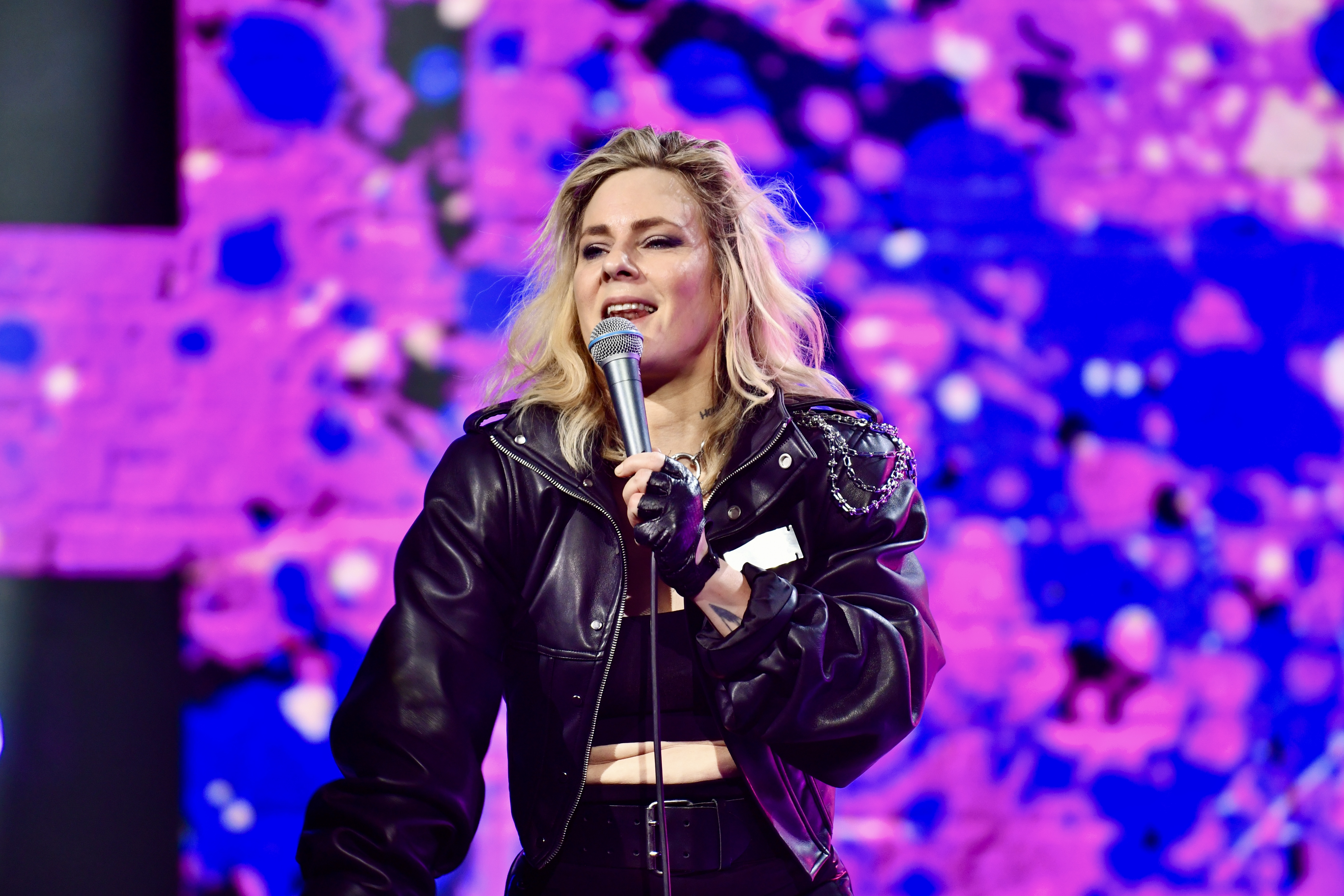
Ivarsson performing "Kamikaze Life"

== Charts ==
Chart performance for "Kamikaze Life"
Chart (2025)	Peak position
Sweden (Sverigetopplistan)	11
