= Idol 2021 (Sweden) =

- Season 2021
- Hosted by: Pär Lernström; Anis Don Demina
- Judges: Kishti Tomita; Alexander Kronlund; Katia Mosally; Anders Bagge
- Winner: Birkir Blær
- Runner-up: Jacqline Mossberg Mounkassa
- Finals venue: Avicii Arena, Stockholm, Sweden

Release
- Original network: TV4
- Original release: 23 August – 10 December 2021

Season chronology
- ← Previous; Season 2020 Next → Season 2022

Idol 2021 was the seventeenth season of the Swedish Idol series. The show was broadcast on TV4 and starts on 23 August 2021. Judge member Nikki Amini left the show after the sixteenth season.

On 27 May 2021, it was announced that Katia Mosally would replace Nikki Amini as new judge for this season.

The winner of this season was the singer Birkir Blær.

== Competition ==
=== Elimination chart ===
| Stadium: | | Qualification week | | | | | | Weekly finals | | | | | | | | | | | Final |
| Date: | | 20/9 | 21/9 | 22/9 | 23/9 | 24/9 | | 1/10 | 8/10 | 15/10 | 22/10 | 29/10 | 5/11 | 12/11 | 19/11 | 26/11 | 3/12 | | 10/12 |
| Place | Contestants | Results | | | | | | | | | | | | | | | | | |
| 1 | Birkir Blær | 3:rd | | | | WC 2 | | | | | | | | | | | | | Winner |
| 2 | Jacqline Mossberg Mounkassa | | | 3:rd | | WC 4 | | | | | | | | 7:th | | | | | Runner-up |
| 3 | Annika Wickihalder | | | | | | | 12:th | | | | | | | | | | Eliminated | |
| 4 | Lana Sulhav | | | | | | | | | | | | | | | 4:th | Eliminated | | |
| 5 | Fredrik Lundman | | | | | | | | 11:th | | | | | | 5:th | Eliminated | | | |
| 6-7 | Sunny Taylor | | | | 3:rd | WC 5 | | | | | | | 8:th | | Eliminated | | | | |
| 6-7 | Erik Elias Ekström | | | | | | | | | | 10:th | | | | Eliminated | | | | |
| 8 | Daut Ajvaz | | | | | | | | | Saved | | 9:th | | Eliminated | | | | | |
| 9 | Amena Alsameai | | | | | | | | | 10:th | | | Eliminated | | | | | | |
| 10 | Philip Ström | | | | | | | | | | | Eliminated | | | | | | | |
| 11 | Emma Petersson Håård | | 3:rd | | | WC 6 | | | | | Eliminated | | | | | | | | |
| 12 | Pär Lindberg | | | | | | | | Eliminated | | | | | | | | | | |
| 13 | Siri Leijon | | 3:rd | | | WC 1 | 13:th | Eliminated | | | | | | | | | | | |
| 14 | Linus Gustafsson | | | 3:rd | | WC 3 | Eliminated | | | | | | | | | | | | |
| Top; 20 | Hamodi Jawad | | | | 3:rd | | | | | | | | | | | | | | |
| Top; 20 | Isabel Neib | | | | 3:rd | | | | | | | | | | | | | | |
| Top; 20 | Jones Alsaadi | | | 3:rd | | | | | | | | | | | | | | | |
| Top; 20 | Eduardo Lidvall | | 3:rd | | | | | | | | | | | | | | | | |
| Top; 20 | Alexandra Imper | 3:rd | | | | | | | | | | | | | | | | | |
| Top; 20 | Lisa Hübbinette Sundström | 3:rd | | | | | | | | | | | | | | | | | |

Legend
| Women | Men | Safe | Not Safe / Bottom 2 / Bottom 3 | Wild Card | Judges Save | Eliminated |

| Top 13 | Top 20 | Bottom 3 | Stage not reached |
