= Sweet n' Psycho =

2025 single by Scarlet

Single by Scarlet
- Released: 28 February 2025
- Length: 2:56
- Label: Polydor Sweden
- Songwriters: Anderz Wrethov; Dino Medanhodzic; Jimmy "Joker" Thörnfeldt; Scarlet Hunts; Thirsty
- Producers: Dino Medanhodzic; Scarlet Hunts; Thirsty

Scarlet singles chronology
"Goddess" (2024)	"Sweet n' Psycho" (2025)

"Sweet n' Psycho" is a song by Swedish band Scarlet, released as a single on 28 February 2025. It was performed in Melodifestivalen 2025, where it advanced to the finals after finishing 2nd in its heat, and it finished in 7th with 64 points.

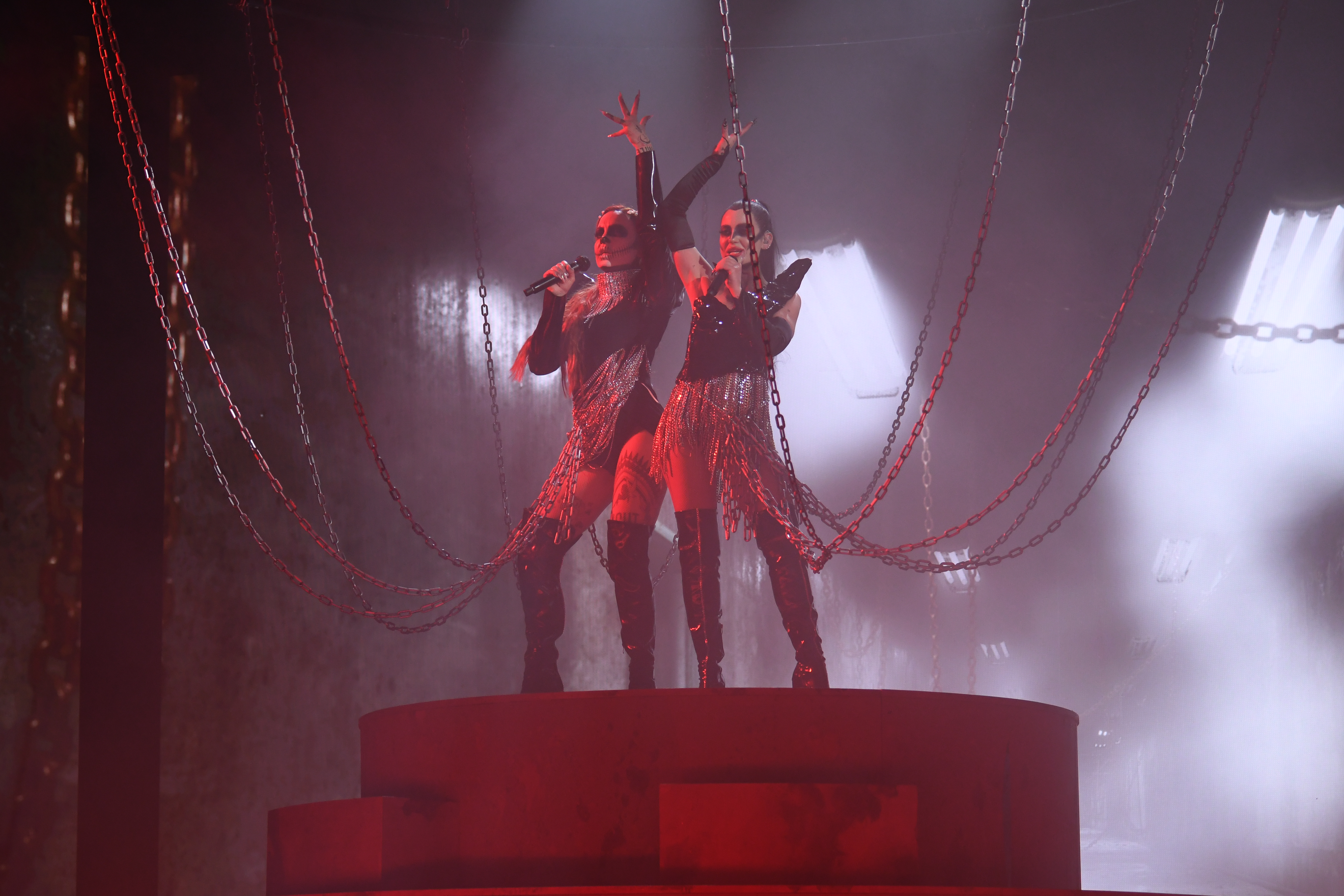
Scarlet performing "Sweet n' Psycho"

== Charts ==
Chart performance for "Sweet n' Psycho"
Chart (2025)	Peak position
Sweden (Sverigetopplistan)	4
