= Sweden in the Eurovision Song Contest 2026 =

- Eurovision Song Contest 2026
- Participating broadcaster: Sveriges Television (SVT)
- Country: Sweden
- Selection process: Melodifestivalen 2026
- Selection date: 7 March 2026

Competing entry
- Song: "My System"
- Artist: Felicia
- Songwriters: Audun Agnar Guldbrandsen; Emily Harbakk; Felicia Eriksson; Julie Bergan; Theresa Rex

Placement
- Semi-final result: Qualified (9th, 96 points)
- Final result: 20th, 51 points

Participation chronology

Sweden was represented at the Eurovision Song Contest 2026 with the song "My System", written by Felicia Eriksson, Audun Agnar Guldbrandsen, Emily Harbakk, Julie Bergan, and Theresa Rex, and performed by Felicia herself. The Swedish participating broadcaster, Sveriges Television (SVT), organised Melodifestivalen 2026 in order to select its entry to the contest.

== Background ==
Prior to the 2026 contest, Sveriges Radio (SR) until 1979, and Sveriges Television (SVT) since 1980, had participated in the Eurovision Song Contest representing Sweden sixty-three times since SR's first entry in 1958. They have won the contest on seven occasions (tying with Ireland for the most wins): in 1974 with the song "Waterloo" performed by ABBA, in 1984 with the song "Diggi-Loo Diggi-Ley" performed by Herreys, in 1991 with the song "Fångad av en stormvind" performed by Carola, in 1999 with the song "Take Me to Your Heaven" performed by Charlotte Nilsson, in 2012 with the song "Euphoria" performed by Loreen, in 2015 with the song "Heroes" performed by Måns Zelmerlöw, and in 2023 with "Tattoo" again performed by Loreen, who became the second artist (after Ireland's Johnny Logan), as well as the first female artist, to win the contest more than once. Following the introduction of semi-finals for the 2004 contest, the Swedish entries, to this point, have featured in every final, except for 2010. In 2025, "Bara bada bastu" performed by KAJ finished fourth with 321 points.

As part of its duties as participating broadcaster, SVT organises the selection of its entry in the Eurovision Song Contest and broadcasts the event in the country. Since 1959, SR first and SVT later have organised the annual competition Melodifestivalen in order to select their entries for the contest.

== Before Eurovision ==
=== Melodifestivalen 2026 ===
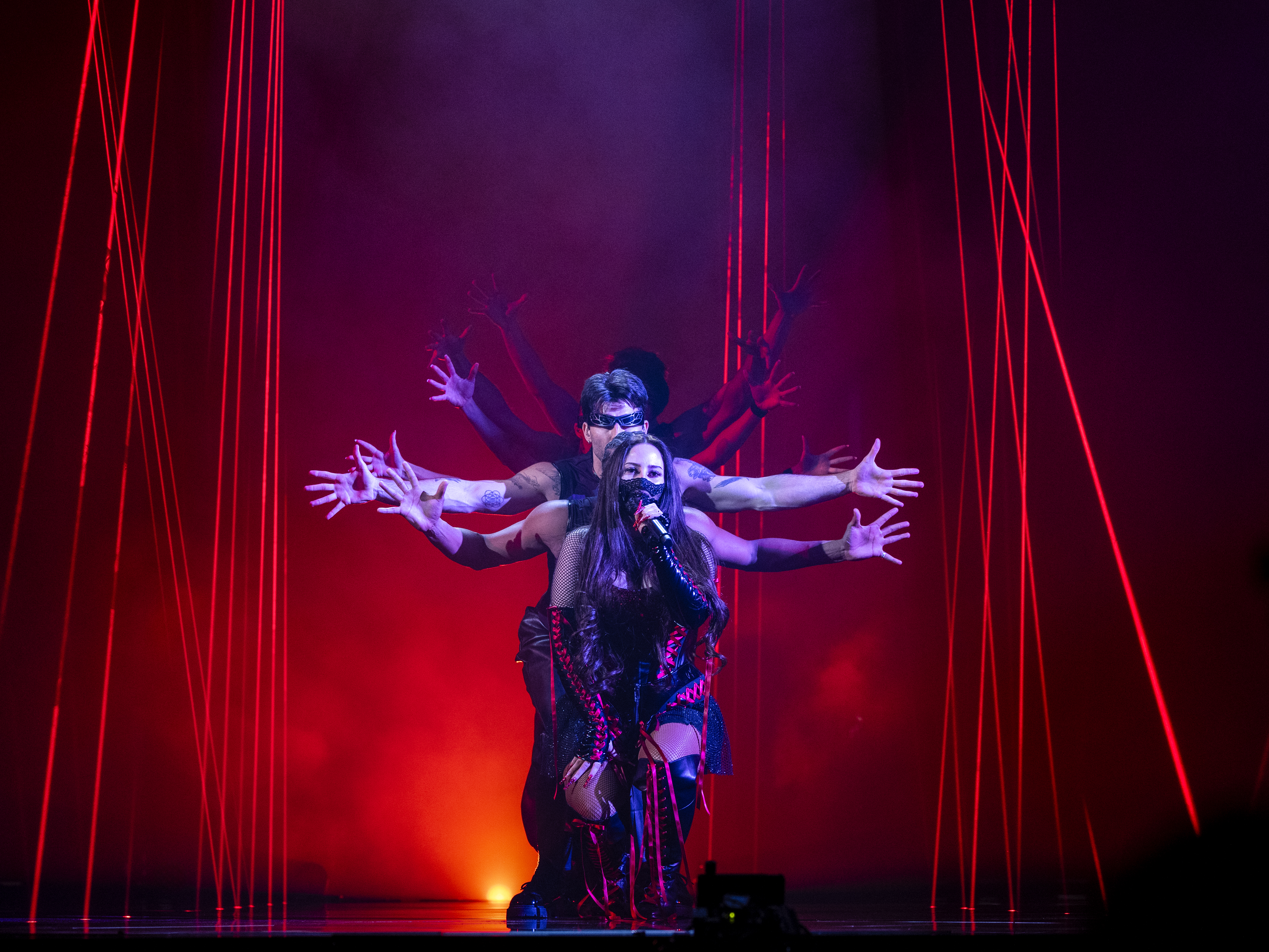
Felicia performing during a rehearsal at Melodifestivalen 2026

The 2026 edition of Melodifestivalen took place between 31 January and 7 March 2026 across six Swedish cities, and consisted of five heats and a final. A submission period was open between 18 August and 12 September 2025 to select the 30 competing entries.

==== Heats ====
- The first heat took place on 31 January 2026 at Saab Arena in Linköping. "Half of Me" performed by Greczula and "Iconic" performed by A-Teens qualified directly to the final, while "Woman" performed by Jacqline advanced to the final qualification round. "Beautiful Lie" performed by Indra, "Berusade ord" performed by Noll2, and "Copacabana Boy" performed by Junior Lerin were eliminated from the contest.
- The second heat took place on 7 February 2026 at Scandinavium in Gothenburg. "My System" performed by Felicia and "Rakt in i elden" performed by Brandsta City Släckers qualified directly to the final, while "Honey Honey" performed by Robin Bengtsson advanced to the final qualification round. "Oxygen" performed by Laila Adèle, "Där hela världen väntar" performed by Klara Almström, and "Glitter" performed by Arwin were eliminated from the contest.
- The third heat took place on 14 February 2026 at Kristianstad Arena in Kristianstad. "Viva L'Amor" performed by Medina and "Ain't Today" performed by Saga Ludvigsson qualified directly to the final, while "Selfish" performed by Eva Jumatate advanced to the final qualification round. "King of Rock 'n' Roll" performed by Korslagda, "Dusk Till Dawn" performed by Patrik Jean, and "Ingenting" performed by Emilia Pantić were eliminated from the contest.
- The fourth heat took place on 21 February 2026 at Malmö Arena in Malmö. "Hollow" performed by Smash into Pieces and "Eternity" performed by Cimberly qualified directly to the final, while "Dooset daram" performed by Meira Omar advanced to the final qualification round. "Från landet" performed by Erika Jonsson, "Ingenting är efter oss" performed by Timo Räisänen, and "Hatar att jag älskar dig" performed by Felix Manu were eliminated from the contest.
- The fifth heat took place on 28 February 2026 at the Gärdehov Arena in Sundsvall. "Delulu" performed by Lilla Al-Fadji and "Waste Your Love" performed by Sanna Nielsen qualified directly to the final, while "Tongue Tied" performed by AleXa advanced to the final qualification round. "Hearts Don't Lie" performed by Vilhelm Buchaus, "Långt från alla andra" performed by Juliett, and "Who You Are" performed by Bladë were eliminated from the contest.
  - Immediately following the fifth heat, a final qualification round took place. All of the songs competed against each other, with each song's votes from their individual heats converted into a new set of points that determined one qualifier for the final, while a new round of voting, held during the final qualification round, had its points combined with those from the previous heats to select the remaining qualifier. "Dooset daram" performed by Meira Omar and "Honey Honey" performed by Robin Bengtsson qualified to the final, while "Selfish" performed by Eva Jumatate, "Woman" performed by Jacqline, and "Tongue Tied" performed by AleXa were eliminated from the contest.

==== Final ====
The final took place on 7 March 2026 at Strawberry Arena in Stockholm.

R/O	Artist	Song	Juries	Public	Total	Place
1	A-Teens	"Iconic"	31	36	67	7
2	Meira Omar	"Dooset daram"	33	8	41	9
3	Lilla Al-Fadji	"Delulu"	24	39	63	8
4	Saga Ludvigsson	"Ain't Today"	5	13	18	12
5	Smash into Pieces	"Hollow"	49	41	90	4
6	Cimberly	"Eternity"	48	30	78	6
7	Medina	"Viva L'Amor"	66	66	132	3
8	Greczula	"Half of Me"	64	70	134	2
9	Robin Bengtsson	"Honey Honey"	22	7	29	11
10	Felicia	"My System"	71	90	161	1
11	Sanna Nielsen	"Waste Your Love"	17	16	33	10
12	Brandsta City Släckers	"Rakt in i elden"	34	48	82	5

== At Eurovision ==
The Eurovision Song Contest 2026 took place at the Wiener Stadthalle in Vienna, Austria, and consisted of two semi-finals held on the respective dates of 12 and 14 May and the final on 16 May 2026. All nations with the exceptions of the host country and the "Big Four" (France, Germany, Italy and the United Kingdom) were required to qualify from one of two semi-finals to compete for the final; the top ten countries from each semi-final progressed to the final. On 12 January 2026, an allocation draw was held to determine which of the two semi-finals, as well as which half of the show, each country performed in; the European Broadcasting Union (EBU) split up the competing countries into different pots based on voting patterns from previous contests, with countries with favourable voting histories put into the same pot.

=== Semi final ===
Sweden was allocated for the first semi final, and later, was announced to perform in position two during the show. Shortly after, the qualification–announcement segment took place, and, at the end of the segment Sweden was announced as one of the ten qualifiers, therefore, Sweden would move on onto the final. It would later be revealed that Sweden placed 9th in the semi-final with 96 points, 79 (7th) from the juries and 17 (13th) from the televote.

=== Final ===
Sweden performed 20th in the final. She placed 20th in the final and became Sweden's lowest ranking in the contest since their non-qualification in 2010.

=== Voting ===
==== Points awarded to Sweden ====
Points awarded to Sweden (Semi-final 1)
Score	Televote	Jury
12 points		
10 points		Belgium; Italy
8 points		Georgia; Lithuania
7 points	Finland	
6 points		Germany
5 points		Croatia; Estonia; Finland; Montenegro; Portugal
4 points	Moldova	San Marino
3 points		Israel; Poland
2 points	Estonia	
1 point	Croatia; Lithuania; Poland; Serbia	Greece; Moldova

Points awarded to Sweden (Final)
Score	Televote	Jury
12 points		
10 points		Denmark; Italy
8 points		
7 points		
6 points	Denmark; Finland	Lithuania
5 points		
4 points	Norway	Montenegro; Norway
3 points		
2 points		
1 point		Germany

==== Points awarded by Sweden ====
Points awarded by Sweden (Semi-final 1)
Score	Televote	Jury
12 points	Finland	Finland
10 points	Israel	Poland
8 points	Poland	Croatia
7 points	Estonia	Belgium
6 points	Serbia	Moldova
5 points	Lithuania	Greece
4 points	Croatia	Israel
3 points	Greece	Portugal
2 points	Portugal	Estonia
1 point	Moldova	San Marino

Points awarded by Sweden (Final)
Score	Televote	Jury
12 points	Finland	Finland
10 points	Denmark	Denmark
8 points	Bulgaria	Australia
7 points	Israel	Czechia
6 points	Australia	Croatia
5 points	Ukraine	Bulgaria
4 points	Greece	Greece
3 points	Romania	Italy
2 points	Poland	France
1 point	Norway	Romania

==== Detailed voting results ====
Each participating broadcaster assembles a seven-member jury panel consisting of music industry professionals who are citizens of the country they represent and two of which have to be between 18 and 25 years old. Each jury, and individual jury member, is required to meet a strict set of criteria regarding professional background, as well as diversity in gender and age. No member of a national jury was permitted to be related in any way to any of the competing acts in such a way that they cannot vote impartially and independently. The individual rankings of each jury member as well as the nation's televoting results were released shortly after the grand final.

The following members comprised the Swedish jury:

- Cornelia Jakobs (represented Sweden in the Eurovision Song Contest 2022)
- Dennis Brøchner
- Ella Tiritiello
- Marlene Strand
- Mathias Lugoboni
- Micke Mårtensson
- William Schmatz

Detailed voting results from Sweden (Semi-final 1)
R/O	Country	Jury									Televote	
R/O	Country	Juror A	Juror B	Juror C	Juror D	Juror E	Juror F	Juror G	Rank	Points	Rank	Points
01	Moldova	6	3	4	11	2	11	13	5	6	10	1
02	Sweden											
03	Croatia	1	4	6	12	6	2	11	3	8	7	4
04	Greece	12	14	2	2	3	12	10	6	5	8	3
05	Portugal	5	6	13	4	11	13	3	8	3	9	2
06	Georgia	14	10	7	8	10	14	8	14		14	
07	Finland	8	1	1	1	1	1	1	1	12	1	12
08	Montenegro	9	11	3	7	14	10	12	12		13	
09	Estonia	11	9	10	9	8	6	2	9	2	4	7
10	Israel	2	13	5	13	7	5	7	7	4	2	10
11	Belgium	4	5	8	3	5	7	9	4	7	11	
12	Lithuania	10	8	11	10	12	8	6	13		6	5
13	San Marino	13	7	14	5	9	9	5	10	1	12	
14	Poland	7	2	9	6	4	3	4	2	10	3	8
15	Serbia	3	12	12	14	13	4	14	11		5	6

Detailed voting results from Sweden (Final)
R/O	Country	Jury									Televote	
R/O	Country	Juror A	Juror B	Juror C	Juror D	Juror E	Juror F	Juror G	Rank	Points	Rank	Points
01	Denmark	7	1	4	3	6	3	8	2	10	2	10
02	Germany	18	11	9	8	22	11	21	18		24	
03	Israel	8	23	24	16	2	8	15	11		4	7
04	Belgium	17	9	7	22	8	19	19	17		20	
05	Albania	19	17	14	13	7	18	9	20		12	
06	Greece	20	4	23	10	19	2	6	7	4	7	4
07	Ukraine	13	14	6	15	9	16	16	16		6	5
08	Australia	2	10	8	2	21	4	4	3	8	5	6
09	Serbia	10	24	20	24	4	24	22	21		15	
10	Malta	14	6	11	6	18	13	20	14		18	
11	Czechia	6	7	5	12	14	7	1	4	7	19	
12	Bulgaria	9	3	12	9	13	5	7	6	5	3	8
13	Croatia	3	20	13	11	1	17	10	5	6	13	
14	United Kingdom	24	22	22	23	24	23	23	24		21	
15	France	4	13	16	7	17	12	3	9	2	16	
16	Moldova	21	18	10	21	12	10	5	15		14	
17	Finland	1	2	1	1	11	1	2	1	12	1	12
18	Poland	5	16	3	17	15	20	18	13		9	2
19	Lithuania	15	21	17	14	16	21	24	22		17	
20	Sweden											
21	Cyprus	11	8	15	19	10	15	14	19		22	
22	Italy	16	12	2	18	3	14	13	8	3	11	
23	Norway	23	5	18	4	20	9	12	12		10	1
24	Romania	12	15	21	5	5	6	17	10	1	8	3
25	Austria	22	19	19	20	23	22	11	23		23	
