= Sweden in the Eurovision Song Contest 2025 =

- Eurovision Song Contest 2025
- Participating broadcaster: Sveriges Television (SVT)
- Country: Sweden
- Selection process: Melodifestivalen 2025
- Selection date: 8 March 2025

Competing entry
- Song: "Bara bada bastu"
- Artist: KAJ
- Songwriters: Anderz Wrethov; Axel Åhman; Jakob Norrgård; Kevin Holmström; Kristofer Strandberg; Robert Skowronski

Placement
- Semi-final result: Qualified (4th, 118 points)
- Final result: 4th, 321 points

Participation chronology

Sweden was represented at the Eurovision Song Contest 2025 with the song "Bara bada bastu", written by Anderz Wrethov, Axel Åhman, Jakob Norrgård, Kevin Holmström, Kristofer Strandberg, and Robert Skowronski, and performed by Åhman, Norrgård, and Holmström as KAJ. The Swedish participating broadcaster, Sveriges Television (SVT), organised Melodifestivalen 2025 in order to select its entry for the contest.

Sweden was drawn to compete in the first semi-final which took place on 13 May 2025. Performing during the show in position 6, Sweden was announced among the top 10 entries of the first semi-final and therefore qualified to compete in the final on 17 May. It was later revealed that Sweden placed fourth out of the 15 participating countries in the semi-final with 118 points. In the final, Sweden performed in position 23 and placed fourth out of the 26 participating countries, scoring 321 points.

== Background ==
Prior to the 2025 contest, Sveriges Radio (SR) until 1979, and Sveriges Television (SVT) since 1980, had participated in the Eurovision Song Contest representing Sweden sixty-three times since SR's first entry in 1958. They have won the contest on seven occasions (tying with Ireland for the most wins): in 1974 with the song "Waterloo" performed by ABBA, in 1984 with the song "Diggi-Loo Diggi-Ley" performed by Herreys, in 1991 with the song "Fångad av en stormvind" performed by Carola, in 1999 with the song "Take Me to Your Heaven" performed by Charlotte Nilsson, in 2012 with the song "Euphoria" performed by Loreen, in 2015 with the song "Heroes" performed by Måns Zelmerlöw, and in 2023 with "Tattoo" again performed by Loreen, who became the second artist (after Ireland's Johnny Logan), as well as the first female artist, to win the contest more than once. Following the introduction of semi-finals for the 2004 contest, the Swedish entries, to this point, have featured in every final, except for 2010. As hosts in 2024, Sweden placed ninth with "Unforgettable" performed by Marcus & Martinus.

As part of its duties as participating broadcaster, SVT organises the selection of its entry in the Eurovision Song Contest and broadcasts the event in the country. Since 1959, SR first and SVT later have organised the annual competition Melodifestivalen in order to select their entries for the contest.

== Before Eurovision ==
=== Melodifestivalen 2025 ===
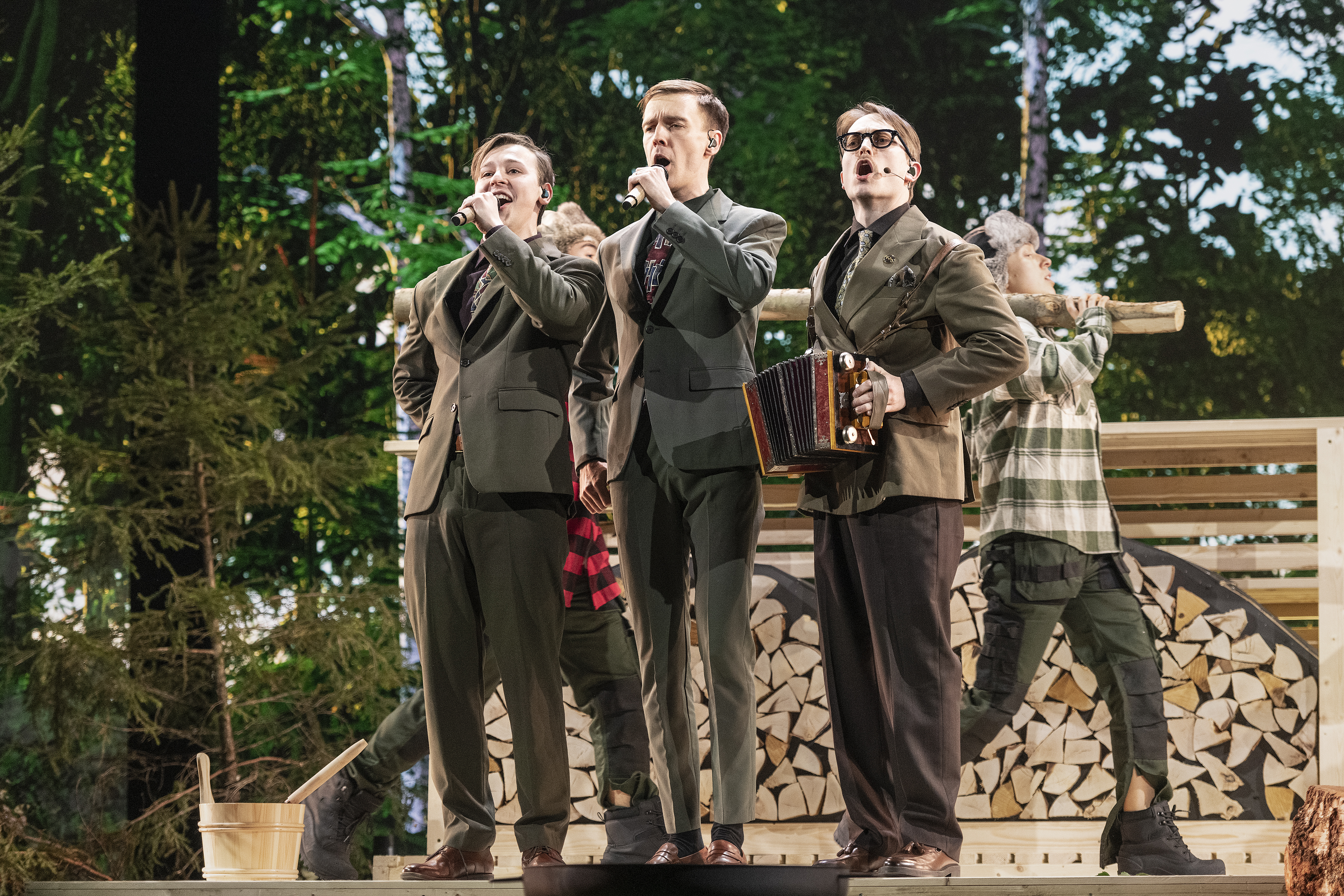
KAJ performing during a rehearsal at Melodifestivalen 2025.

The 2025 edition of Melodifestivalen took place between 1 February and 8 March 2025 across six Swedish cities, and consisted of five heats and a final. A submission period was open between 23 August and 14 September 2024 to select 30 competing entries.

==== Heats ====
- The first heat took place on 1 February 2025 at Coop Norrbotten Arena in Luleå. "Voice of the Silent" performed by John Lundvik and "Kamikaze Life" performed by Maja Ivarsson qualified directly to the final, while "Hush Hush" performed by Meira Omar advanced to the final qualification round. "Upp i luften" performed by Albin Johnsén feat. Pa, "Vår första gång" performed by Adrian Macéus, and "Den känslan" performed by Linnea Henriksson were eliminated from the contest.
- The second heat took place on 8 February 2025 at Scandinavium in Gothenburg. "Show Me What Love Is" performed by Erik Segerstedt and "On and On and On" performed by Klara Hammarström qualified directly to the final, while "Salute" performed by Kaliffa advanced to the final qualification round. "Funniest Thing" performed by Nomi Tales, "The Heart of a Swedish Cowboy" performed by Fredrik Lundman, and "Don Juan" performed by Schlagerz were eliminated from the contest.
- The third heat took place on 15 February 2025 at ABB Arena in Västerås. "Believe Me" performed by Greczula and "Life Again" performed by Annika Wickihalder qualified directly to the final, while "Yihaa" performed by Dolly Style advanced to the final qualification round. "24K Gold" performed by Malou Prytz, "Teardrops" performed by Angelino, and "Rädda mig" performed by Björn Holmgren were eliminated from the contest.
- The fourth heat took place on 22 February 2025 at Malmö Arena in Malmö. "Revolution" performed by Måns Zelmerlöw and "Bara bada bastu" performed by KAJ qualified directly to the final, while "Bara du är där" performed by Ella Tiritiello advanced to the final qualification round. "Vicious" performed by Andreas Lundstedt, "Yours" by Tennessee Tears, and "Do Good Be Better" performed by AmenA were eliminated from the contest.
- The fifth heat took place on 1 March 2025 at the Husqvarna Garden in Jönköping. "Hate You So Much" performed by Saga Ludvigsson and "Sweet n' Psycho" performed by Scarlet qualified directly to the final, while "This Dream of Mine" performed by Arwin advanced to the final qualification round. "I'm Yours" performed by Vilhelm Buchaus, "Ring Baby Ring" performed by Arvingarna, and "Love It!" performed by Victoria Silvstedt were eliminated from the contest.
  - Immediately following the fifth heat, a final qualification round took place. All of the songs competed against each other, with each song's votes from their individual heats converted into a new set of points that determined one qualifier for the final, while a new round of voting, held during the final qualification round, had its points combined with those from the previous heats to select the remaining qualifier. "Yihaa" performed by Dolly Style and "Hush Hush" performed by Meira Omar qualified to the final, while "Bara du är där" performed by Ella Tiritiello, "Salute" performed by Kaliffa, and "This Dream of Mine" performed by Arwin were eliminated from the contest.

==== Final ====
The final took place on 8 March 2025 at the Strawberry Arena in Stockholm.

R/O	Artist	Song	Juries	Public	Total	Place
1	John Lundvik	"Voice of the Silent"	49	25	74	6
2	Dolly Style	"Yihaa"	48	27	75	5
3	Greczula	"Believe Me"	47	56	103	3
4	Klara Hammarström	"On and On and On"	34	43	77	4
5	Scarlet	"Sweet n' Psycho"	31	33	64	7
6	Erik Segerstedt	"Show Me What Love Is"	24	27	51	9
7	Maja Ivarsson	"Kamikaze Life"	2	30	32	11
8	Meira Omar	"Hush Hush"	26	24	50	10
9	Måns Zelmerlöw	"Revolution"	76	81	157	2
10	Saga Ludvigsson	"Hate You So Much"	17	10	27	12
11	Annika Wickihalder	"Life Again"	36	18	54	8
12	KAJ	"Bara bada bastu"	74	90	164	1

== At Eurovision ==
The Eurovision Song Contest took place at St. Jakobshalle in Basel, Switzerland, and consisted of two semi-finals on the respective dates of 13 and 15 May, and the final on 17 May 2025. During the allocation draw held on 28 January 2025, Sweden was drawn to compete in the first semi-final, performing in the first half of the show.

Sweden qualified for the final, finishing in fourth place in the semi-final with 118 points. During the final, Sweden performed in 23th position following Denmark and preceding France. Sweden finished in fourth place with 321 points, finishing sixth in the jury voting with 126 points and in third place with the televoting with 195 points.

=== Voting ===
==== Points awarded to Sweden ====
Points awarded to Sweden (Semi-final 1)
Score	Televote
12 points	Estonia; Iceland; Norway
10 points	
8 points	Belgium; Croatia
7 points	Netherlands; Poland; Portugal; Rest of the World; Switzerland
6 points	Albania; Italy
5 points	Cyprus
4 points	Azerbaijan; Slovenia; Ukraine
3 points	
2 points	Spain
1 point	

Points awarded to Sweden (Final)
Score	Televote	Jury
12 points	Denmark; Estonia; Finland; Norway	Iceland
10 points	Iceland	Finland; Norway; Switzerland
8 points	Australia; Croatia; Latvia; Poland	Estonia; Netherlands
7 points	Czechia; Netherlands; Serbia; United Kingdom	Denmark; Greece
6 points	Armenia; Rest of the World	Armenia; Australia; Belgium; Slovenia
5 points	Germany; Italy; Montenegro; Slovenia; Spain; Switzerland	Austria; Ireland; Luxembourg
4 points	Austria; Belgium; Lithuania; Portugal; Ukraine	Albania; Germany
3 points	Azerbaijan	Croatia
2 points	Albania; Ireland; Israel; Luxembourg	Cyprus
1 point	Georgia; Greece; Malta; San Marino	Lithuania; Malta

==== Points awarded by Sweden ====
Points awarded by Sweden (Semi-final 1)
Score	Televote
12 points	Iceland
10 points	Albania
8 points	Netherlands
7 points	Poland
6 points	Estonia
5 points	Norway
4 points	Ukraine
3 points	San Marino
2 points	Portugal
1 point	Croatia

Points awarded by Sweden (Final)
Score	Televote	Jury
12 points	Israel	Austria
10 points	Finland	Switzerland
8 points	Estonia	Netherlands
7 points	Albania	France
6 points	Poland	Finland
5 points	Iceland	Ukraine
4 points	Ukraine	Norway
3 points	Greece	Albania
2 points	Netherlands	Spain
1 point	Italy	Malta

==== Detailed voting results ====
Each participating broadcaster assembles a five-member jury panel consisting of music industry professionals who are citizens of the country they represent. Each jury, and individual jury member, is required to meet a strict set of criteria regarding professional background, as well as diversity in gender and age. No member of a national jury was permitted to be related in any way to any of the competing acts in such a way that they cannot vote impartially and independently. The individual rankings of each jury member as well as the nation's televoting results were released shortly after the grand final.

The following members comprised the Swedish jury:

- Kenny Lantz
- Micke Cederberg
- Theoz
- Amanda Nordelius
- Anna Charlotta Gunnarson

Detailed voting results from Sweden (Semi-final 1)
R/O	Country	Televote	
R/O	Country	Rank	Points
01	Iceland	1	12
02	Poland	4	7
03	Slovenia	13	
04	Estonia	5	6
05	Ukraine	7	4
06	Sweden		
07	Portugal	9	2
08	Norway	6	5
09	Belgium	11	
10	Azerbaijan	14	
11	San Marino	8	3
12	Albania	2	10
13	Netherlands	3	8
14	Croatia	10	1
15	Cyprus	12	

Detailed voting results from Sweden (Final)
R/O	Country	Jury							Televote	
R/O	Country	Juror A	Juror B	Juror C	Juror D	Juror E	Rank	Points	Rank	Points
01	Norway	8	22	5	3	10	7	4	14	
02	Luxembourg	16	15	4	19	14	14		19	
03	Estonia	9	20	6	15	6	11		3	8
04	Israel	3	23	15	17	12	12		1	12
05	Lithuania	24	6	24	23	25	19		15	
06	Spain	2	18	11	10	9	9	2	18	
07	Ukraine	19	3	3	6	21	6	5	7	4
08	United Kingdom	21	25	19	25	13	25		24	
09	Austria	18	16	2	1	3	1	12	11	
10	Iceland	12	9	23	20	18	20		6	5
11	Latvia	25	5	10	11	23	13		16	
12	Netherlands	1	17	16	2	4	3	8	9	2
13	Finland	10	11	1	9	5	5	6	2	10
14	Italy	15	8	14	7	19	15		10	1
15	Poland	13	10	17	16	22	21		5	6
16	Germany	7	12	21	24	17	18		12	
17	Greece	22	4	22	18	20	16		8	3
18	Armenia	17	24	9	13	8	17		20	
19	Switzerland	4	7	7	4	2	2	10	21	
20	Malta	5	19	8	8	7	10	1	25	
21	Portugal	23	14	20	12	16	24		23	
22	Denmark	20	21	12	14	11	22		13	
23	Sweden									
24	France	14	2	18	5	1	4	7	17	
25	San Marino	11	13	25	21	15	23		22	
26	Albania	6	1	13	22	24	8	3	4	7
