= Israel in the Eurovision Song Contest 2026 =

- Eurovision Song Contest 2026
- Participating broadcaster: Israeli Public Broadcasting Corporation (IPBC/Kan)
- Country: Israel
- Selection process: Artist: HaKokhav HaBa L'Eirovizion; Song: Internal selection
- Selection date: Artist: 20 January 2026; Song: 5 March 2026

Competing entry
- Song: "Michelle"
- Artist: Noam Bettan
- Songwriters: Nadav Aharoni; Noam Bettan; Tzlil Klifi; Yuval Raphael

Placement
- Semi-final result: Qualified (1st, 269 points)
- Final result: 2nd, 343 points

Participation chronology

Israel was represented at the Eurovision Song Contest 2026 by the song "Michelle", written by Nadav Aharoni, Noam Bettan, Tzlil Klifi, and Yuval Raphael, and performed by Bettan himself. The Israeli participating broadcaster, the Israeli Public Broadcasting Corporation (IPBC/Kan), selected Bettan as its representative through the show HaKokhav HaBa L'Eirovizion, in collaboration with commercial broadcaster Keshet and Tedy Productions, while the song "Michelle" was chosen internally. As with the previous two years, Israel's participation was the subject of controversy due to the Gaza war.

Israel was drawn to compete in the first semi-final of the Eurovision Song Contest which took place on 12 May 2026. Performing during the show in position 10, Israel was announced among the top 10 entries of the first semi-final and therefore qualified to compete in the final on 16 May. It was later revealed that Israel placed first out of the 15 participating countries in the semi-final with 269 points. In the final, Israel performed in position 3 and placed second out of the 25 participating countries, scoring 343 points.

== Background ==
Prior to the 2026 contest, the Israel Broadcasting Authority (IBA) until 2017, and the Israeli Public Broadcasting Corporation (IPBC/Kan) since 2018, had participated in the Eurovision Song Contest representing Israel forty-seven times since the IBA's first entry in 1973. They had won the contest on four occasions: in 1978 with the song "A-Ba-Ni-Bi" by Izhar Cohen and the Alphabeta, in 1979 with the song "Hallelujah" by Milk and Honey, in 1998 with the song "Diva" by Dana International, and in 2018 with the song "Toy" by Netta. Since the introduction of semi-finals in 2004, they had, to this point, managed to qualify to the final 14 times, achieving, besides its 2018 victory, six top ten results, most recently in 2025 with "New Day Will Rise" by Yuval Raphael placing second.

As part of its duties as participating broadcaster, Kan selects an entry to represent Israel in the Eurovision Song Contest and broadcasts the event in the country. Kan confirmed its intention to participate in the 2026 contest on 28 June 2025, announcing on 29 September that its representative would continue to be selected through the reality singing competition HaKokhav HaBa (Rising Star).

The Gaza war has made Israel's participation in the contest increasingly controversial, prompting calls for its exclusion and protests at the previous two editions. Broadcasters from Ireland, the Netherlands, Slovenia, and Spain announced their intention to boycott the 2026 contest if Israel were allowed to compete. Following the European Broadcasting Union (EBU) general assembly meeting on 4 December 2025, which permitted Israel's participation, all four broadcasters proceeded with their boycott, joined by Iceland six days later.

== Before Eurovision ==
=== HaKokhav HaBa L'Eirovizion ===
The artist who would represent Israel in the Eurovision Song Contest 2026 was selected through the reality singing competition HaKokhav HaBa L'Eirovizion (transl. The Next Star for Eurovision), produced by Tedy Productions and Keshet Media Group, and broadcast on Keshet 12 as well as online via mako.co.il. The shows took place at the Neve Ilan Communications Center in Neve Ilan, and were hosted by Assi Azar and Rotem Sela. The judging panel for the competition composed of Assaf Amdursky, Keren Peles, Shiri Maimon (who represented Israel in 2005), Itay Levi, and Eden Hason. A rotating panel of several guest judges also joined, though they were only called upon to vote if a main judge was absent from a performance.

==== Auditions ====
Candidates were required to get a score of at least 70% of the votes from the judges and the studio audience in order to advance.

Audition 1 – 11 November 2025
Draw	Artist	Song	Jury votes					Score	Result
Draw	Artist	Song	A. A.	E. H.	K. P.	I. L.	S. M.	Score	Result
1	Agam Hazan	"Never Enough"	Yes	Yes	Yes	Yes	Yes	94%	Advanced
2	Uriah Cohen and Itamar Ohana	"Ze Ma SheNish'ar"	No	Yes	Yes	Yes	No	60%	Eliminated
3	Tzahala Gazit	"Al Kol Ele"	Yes	Yes	Yes	Yes	Yes	90%	Advanced
4	Gilly Tsanaani	"All I Want"	Yes	Yes (Note: Hason was not present for this vote, so Dana International voted in his place.)	Yes	Yes	Yes	93%	Advanced
5	Daniel Shevtsov	"Make You Feel My Love"	Yes	Yes	Yes	Yes	Yes	88%	Advanced
6	Alona Erez	"At Last"	Yes	Yes	Yes	Yes	Yes	96%	Advanced

Audition 2 – 15 November 2025
Draw	Artist	Song	Jury votes					Score	Result
Draw	Artist	Song	A. A.	E. H.	K. P.	I. L.	S. M.	Score	Result
1	Tair Adanek	"If I Ain't Got You"	Yes	Yes	Yes	Yes	Yes	94%	Advanced
2	Shira Zloof	"Abir Al Sus Lavan Be'emtza Florentin"	Yes	Yes	Yes	Yes	Yes	90%	Advanced
3	Shaked Solomon	"Mi Tirtzi"	Yes	Yes	Yes	Yes	Yes	90%	Advanced
4	Shaya Avitan	"Listen"	Yes	Yes	Yes	Yes	Yes	92%	Advanced
5	Moriel Harush	"Ahuvati Kvar Lo Ro'a Uti"	No	Yes	Yes (Note: Peles was not present for this vote, so Dana International and Shay Kerem voted in her place.)	Yes	Yes	69%	Eliminated
6	Noam Bettan	"Madam"	Yes	Yes	Yes	Yes	Yes	98%	Advanced

Audition 3 – 16 November 2025
Draw	Artist	Song	Jury votes					Score	Result
Draw	Artist	Song	A. A.	E. H.	K. P.	I. L.	S. M.	Score	Result
1	Elior Shemesh	"Where Have You Been"	Yes	Yes	Yes	Yes	Yes	82%	Advanced
2	Ori Berko	"Achari Esrim Shana"	Yes	Yes	Yes	Yes	Yes	90%	Advanced
3	Odeya Esther Ben Amram	"I See Red"	No	No	Yes	No	Yes	46%	Eliminated
4	Gal De Paz	"A Change Is Gonna Come"	No	Yes	Yes	Yes	Yes	91%	Advanced
5	Avi Assor	"Ad Machar"	No	Yes	Yes	Yes	Yes	79%	Advanced
6	Dorin Or	"Mevarechet"	Yes	Yes	Yes	Yes	Yes	83%	Advanced

Audition 4 – 20 November 2025
Draw	Artist	Song	Jury votes					Score	Result
Draw	Artist	Song	A. A.	E. H.	K. P.	I. L.	S. M.	Score	Result
1	Tamir Levy	"HaKol Ad LeKhan"	Yes	Yes	Yes	Yes	Yes	94%	Advanced
2	Dylan Morgan	"Happier Than Ever"	Yes	Yes	Yes	Yes	No	81%	Advanced
3	Lior Kakon	"Yam Shel D'maot"	Yes	Yes	Yes	Yes	Yes	96%	Advanced
4	Shir Azaria	"Young and Beautiful"	No	Yes	No	Yes	No	42%	Eliminated
5	Ori Aharon	"Medumian"	Yes	Yes	Yes	Yes	Yes	94%	Advanced
6	Eitan Aharon	"Al Tishlihani Le'et Zkena"	Yes	Yes	Yes	Yes	Yes	92%	Advanced

Audition 5 – 22 November 2025
Draw	Artist	Song	Jury votes					Score	Result
Draw	Artist	Song	A. A.	E. H.	K. P.	I. L.	S. M.	Score	Result
1	Itay Evron	"Let's Get It On"	No	Yes	Yes	Yes	Yes	84%	Advanced
2	Bar Nir	"River"	Yes	Yes	Yes	Yes	Yes	89%	Advanced
3	Balcony Band	"Mary Lou"	No	No	Yes	Yes	No	50%	Eliminated
4	David Ossona	"Feeling Good"	Yes	Yes	Yes	Yes	Yes	93%	Advanced
5	Stav Vaknin	"Basivuv HaBa"	Yes	Yes	Yes	Yes	Yes	93%	Advanced
6	Portrait	"HaKol Mevina"	Yes	Yes	Yes	Yes	Yes	81%	Advanced

Audition 6 – 23 November 2025
Draw	Artist	Song	Jury votes					Score	Result
Draw	Artist	Song	A. A.	E. H.	K. P.	I. L.	S. M.	Score	Result
1	Mecy Kashty	"I'm Not the Only One"	Yes	Yes	Yes	Yes	Yes	86%	Advanced
2	Achia Edri	"Yaldut Niskachat"	Yes	Yes	Yes (Note: Peles was not present for this vote, so Netta Barzilai voted in her place.)	Yes	Yes	96%	Advanced
3	Mentamer Taganya	"When We Were Young"	Yes	Yes	Yes	Yes	Yes	89%	Advanced
4	Ron Bitton	"HaRishona"	No	Yes	Yes	Yes	No	58%	Eliminated
5	Amy Lensson	"You Don't Own Me"	No	Yes	Yes	Yes	Yes	77%	Advanced
6	Ido Maurer	"Jealous"	Yes	Yes	Yes	Yes	Yes	96%	Advanced

Audition 7 – 25 November 2025
Draw	Artist	Song	Jury votes					Score	Result
Draw	Artist	Song	A. A.	E. H.	K. P.	I. L.	S. M.	Score	Result
1	Mor Fadlon	"Madam"	No	Yes	Yes	Yes	Yes	78%	Advanced
2	Daniel Azar	"HaNisayon HaZe"	Yes	Yes	Yes	Yes	Yes	80%	Advanced
3	Eliraz Zada	"Sign of the Times"	Yes	Yes	Yes	Yes	Yes	88%	Advanced
4	Aya Assaf	"Tell Me Where the Light Goes"	Yes	Yes	Yes	Yes	Yes	92%	Advanced
5	Lihi Sade	"Love on the Brain"	No	Yes	No (Note: Peles was not present for this vote, so Dana International voted in her place.)	Yes (Note: Levi was not present for this vote, so Netta Barzilai voted in his place.)	Yes	67%	Eliminated
6	Saar Hadar	"HaLev HaShavur Hakhi Yafe BeOlam"	Yes	Yes	Yes	Yes	Yes	77%	Advanced

Audition 8 – 26 November 2025
Draw	Artist	Song	Jury votes					Score	Result
Draw	Artist	Song	A. A.	E. H.	K. P.	I. L.	S. M.	Score	Result
1	Itamar Achiel	"HaOr BeKhayay"	Yes	No	Yes	No	Yes	66%	Saved
2	Gala Ohayon Katz	"Summertime Sadness"	Yes	Yes	Yes	Yes	Yes	82%	Advanced
3	Yasmin Shimoni	"Russian Roulette"	Yes	No	No	Yes	Yes	92%	Advanced
4	Asaf Pepel	"HaOlam HaMetukan"	No	No	Yes	Yes	Yes	53%	Eliminated
5	Hela Gorelik	"All I Ask"	No	Yes	Yes	No	Yes	90%	Advanced
6	Nave Levi	"Kinori"	No	Yes	Yes	Yes	Yes	88%	Advanced

Audition 9 – 29 November 2025
Draw	Artist	Song	Jury votes					Score	Result
Draw	Artist	Song	A. A.	E. H.	K. P.	I. L.	S. M.	Score	Result
1	Daniella Lugassy	"Adagio"	Yes	No	Yes	Yes	Yes	79%	Advanced
2	Yehuda Ifrah	"HaYom Kamti Sameach"	Yes	Yes	Yes	Yes	Yes	92%	Advanced
3	Shirel Balaish	"A Whole New World"	Yes	No	Yes (Note: Peles was not present for this vote, so Izhar Cohen voted in her place.)	No	No	45%	Eliminated
4	Ben-Ad Korem	"Lose Control"	Yes	Yes	Yes	Yes	Yes	92%	Advanced
5	Noam Azut	"Kchi Oti Le'tayel"	Yes	Yes	Yes	Yes	Yes	80%	Advanced
6	Gali Givon	"Toxic"	Yes	Yes	Yes	No	Yes	72%	Advanced

Audition 10 – 30 November 2025
Draw	Artist	Song	Jury votes					Score	Result
Draw	Artist	Song	A. A.	E. H.	K. P.	I. L.	S. M.	Score	Result
1	Oriel Haviv	"Tamid Oto Dvar"	Yes	Yes	Yes	Yes	Yes	92%	Advanced
2	Lihi Butbul	"Lazot SheNitzha"	Yes	Yes	Yes	Yes	No	74%	Advanced
3	Noam Cohen	"Rise Up"	Yes	Yes	Yes	Yes	Yes	94%	Advanced
4	Larry Fidler	"Make You Feel My Love"	Yes	No	Yes	No	No	44%	Eliminated
5	Gon Halevi	"Tochu Retzuf Ahava"	No	Yes	No	Yes	Yes	74%	Advanced
6	Nitay Avraham	"Absord"	No	Yes	Yes	Yes	Yes	72%	Advanced

Audition 11 – 2 December 2025
Draw	Artist	Song	Jury votes					Score	Result
Draw	Artist	Song	A. A.	E. H.	K. P.	I. L.	S. M.	Score	Result
1	Jenny Penkin	"My All"	Yes	No	Yes	Yes	Yes	71%	Advanced
2	Anava Amoyal	"Gvulot Higayon"	Yes	Yes	Yes	Yes	Yes	93%	Advanced
3	Harel Tayri	"Psikhopat"	No	No	Yes	Yes	Yes	54%	Eliminated
4	Shira Ittah	"October Sky"	Yes	Yes	Yes	No	Yes	93%	Advanced
5	Yotam Olmer	"Mi Haya Ma'amin"	Yes	No	Yes	Yes	Yes	67%	Eliminated
6	Michael HarPaz	"I'll Be Alright"	No	Yes	Yes	Yes	Yes	74%	Advanced

Audition 12 – 6 December 2025
Draw	Artist	Song	Jury votes					Score	Result
Draw	Artist	Song	A. A.	E. H.	K. P.	I. L.	S. M.	Score	Result
1	Nathan Ben Shimon	"Aba"	No	Yes	Yes	Yes	Yes	82%	Advanced
2	Sandy Deri	"Don't You Worry 'Bout a Thing"	Yes	Yes	Yes	Yes	No	76%	Advanced
3	Eden Hen	"Ratziti L'Daber Itach"	Yes	Yes	Yes	Yes	Yes	89%	Advanced
4	Avraham Dahan	"Yesh Bech"	No	Yes	No	Yes	Yes	60%	Eliminated
5	Nuriel Yashar	"Shallow"	Yes	Yes	No	Yes	Yes	78%	Advanced
6	Rotem Sharabi	"HaYamim Shelanu"	Yes	Yes	Yes	Yes	Yes	86%	Advanced

Audition 13 – 7 December 2025
Draw	Artist	Song	Jury votes					Score	Result
Draw	Artist	Song	A. A.	E. H.	K. P.	I. L.	S. M.	Score	Result
1	Elad Shahar	"Be'ir Sheli"	No	Yes	Yes	No	Yes	62%	Eliminated
2	Maya Rose	"Listen"	Yes	Yes	Yes	No	Yes	79%	Advanced
3	Harel Mauda	"Holech Li Meyoash"	No	Yes	Yes	Yes	Yes	79%	Advanced
4	Elimelech Talaleh	"Mi'ma'amakim"	No	Yes	Yes	Yes	Yes	83%	Advanced
5	Ofek Cohen	"HaDerech HaBeita"	No	Yes	No	Yes	Yes	70%	Advanced
6	Yaron As	"Geshem"	No	Yes	Yes	Yes	Yes	82%	Advanced

Audition 14 – 9 December 2025
Draw	Artist	Song	Jury votes					Score	Result
Draw	Artist	Song	A. A.	E. H.	K. P.	I. L.	S. M.	Score	Result
1	Noam Pinto	"HaYom Kamti Sameach"	Yes	Yes	Yes	Yes	Yes	83%	Advanced
2	Odelia Baranes	"Ani Bucha"	Yes	Yes	Yes	Yes	Yes	74%	Advanced
3	Idan Ari	"Mercy"	Yes	No	Yes	No	Yes	58%	Eliminated
4	Ziv Bossidan	"HaMedumyan"	No	Yes	Yes	Yes	Yes	85%	Advanced
5	Avishag Atia	"Wildflower"	No	Yes	Yes	Yes	—N/a	57%	Eliminated
6	Omri Fils	"Brosh"	No	Yes	Yes	Yes	Yes	70%	Advanced

==== Shortlisting round ====
The 68 candidates who advanced from the auditions each performed an "intimate" song, and the judges picked 21 to proceed. Those candidates were: Agam Hazan, Alona Erez, Daniel Azar, Daniel Shevtsov, Dorin Or, Eitan Aharon, Elior Shemesh, Gal De Paz, Gilly Tsanaani, Mentamer Taganya, Michael HarPaz, Nave Levi, Noam Bettan, Ori Berko, Portrait, Saar Hadar, Shaked Solomon, Shaya Avitan, Shira Zloof, Stav Vaknin, and Tamir Levy.

==== Top 21 round ====
In the top 21 round, the votes of the judges and an audience determine one or two contestants to be eliminated from each show.

Top 21 round – Show 1 – 13 December 2025
Draw	Artist	Song	Jury votes					Score	Result
Draw	Artist	Song	A.A.	E.H.	K.P.	I.L.	S.M.	Score	Result
1	Agam Hazan	"Baby"	No	Yes	Yes	Yes	Yes	80%	Advanced
2	Elior Shemesh	"Supergirl"	No	No	Yes	Yes	Yes	65%	Advanced
3	Daniel Azar	"Kol HaMilim"	No	Yes	Yes	Yes	Yes	80%	Advanced
4	Portrait	"Ad Elaiach"	Yes	Yes	Yes	Yes	Yes	84%	Advanced
5	Gilly Tsanaani	"Girls Just Want to Have Fun"	No	Yes	Yes	Yes	Yes	79%	Advanced
6	Saar Hadar	"Rochot"	No	Yes	Yes	Yes	No	56%	Eliminated
7	Alona Erez	"Strange"	Yes	No	Yes	No	Yes	72%	Advanced

Top 21 round – Show 2 – 16 December 2025
Draw	Artist	Song	Jury votes					Score	Result
Draw	Artist	Song	A.A.	E.H.	K.P.	I.L.	S.M.	Score	Result
1	Shira Zloof	"Drivers License"	No	Yes	Yes	Yes	Yes	79%	Advanced
2	Shaked Solomon	"Ve'at"	No	Yes	Yes	Yes	Yes	76%	Advanced
3	Gal De Paz	"Cryin'"	Yes	Yes	Yes	Yes	Yes	90%	Advanced
4	Eitan Aharon	"SheAriyot Me'atzmi"	No	Yes	Yes	Yes	Yes	81%	Advanced
5	Mentamer Taganya	"Traitor"	Yes	Yes	No	Yes	Yes	75%	Advanced
6	Daniel Shevtsov	"The Scientist"	No	Yes	Yes	No	No	50%	Eliminated
7	Noam Bettan	"Ahava Hola"	Yes	Yes	Yes	Yes	Yes	96%	Advanced

Top 21 round – Show 3 – 20 December 2025
Draw	Artist	Song	Jury votes					Score	Result
Draw	Artist	Song	A.A.	E.H.	K.P.	I.L.	S.M.	Score	Result
1	Stav Vaknin	"Yom Kippur"	No	Yes	Yes	Yes	Yes	74.8%	Advanced
2	Tamir Levy	"Karma Police"	No	Yes	Yes	Yes	Yes	75%	Advanced
3	Michael HarPaz	"Ani"	Yes	Yes	Yes	Yes	Yes	81%	Advanced
4	Shaya Avitan	"The Climb"	Yes	No	Yes	Yes	Yes	74.6%	Advanced
5	Nave Levi	"Rak SheTeda Et Ha'amet"	No	No	Yes	Yes	Yes	55%	Advanced
6	Ori Berko	"Dvarim SheArtziti Lomar"	No	Yes	No	Yes	No	37%	Eliminated
7	Dorin Or	"Narkomanit"	No	Yes	Yes	Yes	Yes	76%	Advanced

Top 18 round – Show 4 – 22 December 2025
Draw	Artist	Song	Jury votes					Score	Result
Draw	Artist	Song	A.A.	E.H.	K.P.	I.L.	S.M.	Score	Result
1	Elior Shemesh	"Yehafim"	Yes	Yes	No	Yes	Yes	84%	Advanced
1	Agam Hazan	"Yehafim"	Yes	Yes	No	Yes	Yes	84%	Advanced
2	Tamir Levy	"Kchi Lech Zman"	Yes	Yes	Yes	Yes	Yes	90%	Advanced
2	Daniel Azar	"Kchi Lech Zman"	Yes	Yes	Yes	Yes	Yes	90%	Advanced
3	Michael HarPaz	"Levad BeMadav"	No	Yes	Yes	No	Yes	56%	Advanced
3	Portrait	"Levad BeMadav"	No	Yes	Yes	No	Yes	56%	Advanced
4	Gilly Tsanaani	"Locked Out of Heaven"	No	No	No	Yes	No	45%	Saved
4	Mentamer Taganya	"Locked Out of Heaven"	No	No	No	Yes	No	45%	Eliminated
5	Noam Bettan	"Billie Jean"	No	Yes	Yes	Yes	Yes	83%	Advanced
5	Gal De Paz	"Billie Jean"	No	Yes	Yes	Yes	Yes	83%	Advanced

Top 18 round – Show 5 – 23 December 2025
Draw	Artist	Song	Jury votes					Score	Result
Draw	Artist	Song	A.A.	E.H.	K.P.	I.L.	S.M.	Score	Result
1	Shaked Solomon	"Ad Matay Elohai"	No	Yes	Yes	Yes	Yes	77%	Advanced
1	Nave Levi	"Ad Matay Elohai"	No	Yes	Yes	Yes	Yes	77%	Advanced
2	Eitan Aharon	"Leha'amin"	Yes	Yes	Yes	Yes	Yes	92%	Advanced
2	Stav Vaknin	"Leha'amin"	Yes	Yes	Yes	Yes	Yes	92%	Advanced
3	Shaya Avitan	"Kula Levad"	Yes	Yes	No	No	No	46%	Eliminated
3	Dorin Or	"Kula Levad"	Yes	Yes	No	No	No	46%	Saved
4	Alona Erez	"Ba'at Li Pit'om"	No	Yes	Yes	Yes	Yes	82%	Advanced
4	Shira Zloof	"Ba'at Li Pit'om"	No	Yes	Yes	Yes	Yes	82%	Advanced

Top 16 round – Show 6 – 27 December 2025
Duel	Draw	Artist	Song	Jury votes					Score	Result
Duel	Draw	Artist	Song	A.A.	E.H.	K.P.	I.L.	S.M.	Score	Result
I	1	Michael HarPaz	"Ordinary"	Yes	No	Yes	Yes	Yes	74%	Saved
I	2	Tamir Levy	"Sex on Fire"	No	Yes	Yes	Yes	Yes	80%	Advanced
II	3	Agam Hazan	"Unicorn"	Yes	Yes	Yes	Yes	Yes	82%	Advanced
II	4	Stav Vaknin	"HaSheket SheNish'ar"	No	No	Yes	No	Yes	54%	Eliminated
III	5	Elior Shemesh	"Rehab"	No	No	Yes	Yes	Yes	64%	Advanced
III	6	Nave Levi	"Kmo Shikor"	Yes	Yes	Yes	No	No	62%	Saved
IV	8	Alona Erez	"Ex's & Oh's"	Yes	No	Yes	Yes	Yes	80%	Saved
IV	9	Noam Bettan	"Buba"	Yes	Yes	Yes	Yes	Yes	96%	Advanced

Top 16 round – Show 7 – 28 December 2025
Duel	Draw	Artist	Song	Jury votes					Score	Result
Duel	Draw	Artist	Song	A.A.	E.H.	K.P.	I.L.	S.M.	Score	Result
I	1	Portrait	"Hayav Lamut Alay"	Yes	Yes	Yes	Yes	Yes	77%	Saved
I	2	Dorin Or	"Nais Balamo"	Yes	Yes	Yes	Yes	Yes	81%	Advanced
II	3	Eitan Aharon	"Tani Li Yad"	Yes	Yes	Yes	Yes	Yes	87%	Advanced
II	4	Shaked Solomon	"Kol Kach Mukar"	No	No	Yes	Yes	Yes	67%	Saved
III	5	Gilly Tsanaani	"Me Too"	No	Yes	Yes	Yes	Yes	64%	Eliminated
III	6	Gal De Paz	"Vampire"	No	Yes	Yes	Yes	Yes	77%	Advanced
IV	7	Daniel Azar	"Matanot"	No	Yes	Yes	Yes	No	61%	Saved
IV	8	Shira Zloof	"Ma'ariv LaNoar"	Yes	Yes	Yes	Yes	Yes	83%	Advanced

Top 14 round – Show 8 – 30 December 2025
Draw	Artist	Guest artist	Song	Jury votes					Score	Result
Draw	Artist	Guest artist	Song	A.A.	E.H.	K.P.	I.L.	S.M.	Score	Result
1	Dorin Or	Yuval Dayan	"Ahava Asura"	Yes	Yes	Yes	Yes	Yes	75%	Advanced
2	Alona Erez	Miri Mesika	"Skyfall"	Yes	Yes	Yes	Yes	Yes	94%	Advanced
3	Eitan Aharon	Uri Aharon	"Ner Al HaChalon"	Yes	Yes	Yes	Yes	Yes	91%	Advanced
4	Portrait	Pablo Rosenberg	"Bo'i Venavi Lech T'pank"	No	Yes	Yes	Yes	Yes	66%	Eliminated
5	Noam Bettan	Yuval Raphael	"Mon amour"	No	Yes	Yes	Yes	Yes	84%	Advanced

Top 14 round – Show 9 – 3 January 2026
Draw	Artist	Guest artist	Song	Jury votes					Score	Result
Draw	Artist	Guest artist	Song	A.A.	E.H.	K.P.	I.L.	S.M.	Score	Result
1	Shira Zloof	Keren Peles	"Mami"	Yes	Yes	—N/a	Yes	Yes	91%	Advanced
2	Nave Levi	Shimon Buskila	"Yesh Bi Ahava"	No	Yes	Yes	Yes	Yes	71%	Advanced
3	Agam Hazan	Roni Daloomi	"What About Us"	No	Yes	No	Yes	No	53%	Advanced
4	Daniel Azar	Liran Danino	"Yesh Ein Sof"	No	No	Yes	Yes	No	50%	Eliminated
5	Gal De Paz	Red Band	"You and I"	Yes	Yes	Yes	No	Yes	64%	Advanced

Top 14 round – Show 10 – 4 January 2026
Draw	Artist	Guest artist	Song	Jury votes					Score	Result
Draw	Artist	Guest artist	Song	A.A.	E.H.	K.P.	I.L.	S.M.	Score	Result
1	Shaked Solomon	Lior Narkis	"Kshe'at Atzuva"	No	Yes	Yes	Yes	Yes	78%	Advanced
2	Elior Shemesh	Noam Kleinstein	"Im Zu Ahava"	No	Yes	Yes	No	Yes	63%	Eliminated
3	Michael HarPaz	Maya Bouskilla	"All by Myself"	No	Yes	Yes	Yes	Yes	78%	Advanced
4	Tamir Levy	Raviv Kaner	"Eifa Hayit"	Yes	Yes	Yes	Yes	Yes	88%	Advanced

Top 11 round – Show 11 – 6 January 2026
Draw	Artist	Song	Jury votes					Score	Result
Draw	Artist	Song	A. A.	E. H.	K. P.	I. L.	S. M.	Score	Result
1	Michael HarPaz	"Story of My Life"	Yes	Yes	Yes	Yes	Yes	90%	Advanced
2	Alona Erez	"Stay"	Yes	Yes	Yes	Yes	Yes	96%	Advanced
3	Gal De Paz	"(You Make Me Feel Like) A Natural Woman"	No	Yes	Yes	Yes	Yes	78%	Advanced
4	Tamir Levy	"Smells Like Teen Spirit"	No	Yes	No	No	Yes	49%	Saved
5	Eitan Aharon	"Od Yiyah Li"	No	No	Yes	Yes	No	55%	Eliminated
6	Noam Bettan	"Lailot VeKlalot"	Yes	Yes	Yes	Yes	Yes	96%	Advanced

Top 11 round – Show 12 – 7 January 2026
Draw	Artist	Song	Jury votes					Score	Result
Draw	Artist	Song	A. A.	E. H.	K. P.	I. L.	S. M.	Score	Result
1	Nave Levi	"Madmu'azel"	Yes	Yes	Yes	Yes	Yes	88%	Advanced
2	Agam Hazan	"How Far I'll Go"	Yes	Yes	No	No	Yes	66%	Saved
3	Shaked Solomon	"Ananim"	No	Yes	Yes	Yes	Yes	79%	Advanced
4	Dorin Or	"Lailot VeKlalot"	No	Yes	Yes	Yes	No	52%	Eliminated
5	Shira Zloof	"Kol HaZman HaZe"	Yes	Yes	Yes	Yes	Yes	86%	Advanced

Top 9 round – Show 13 – 10 January 2026
Draw	Artist	Song	Jury votes					Score	Result
Draw	Artist	Song	A. A.	E. H.	K. P.	I. L.	S. M.	Score	Result
1	Tamir Levy	"Nivreti Lech"	No	Yes	Yes	Yes	Yes	79%	Eliminated
2	Shira Zloof	"Island"	Yes	Yes	Yes	Yes	Yes	92%	Advanced
3	Shaked Solomon	"Shadot Shel Eirusim"	No	Yes	No	No	Yes	55%	Saved
4	Gal De Paz	"Acharei HaKol Et Shir"	Yes	Yes	Yes	Yes	Yes	81%	Advanced

Top 9 round – Show 14 – 11 January 2026
Draw	Artist	Song	Jury votes					Score	Result
Draw	Artist	Song	A. A.	E. H.	K. P.	I. L.	S. M.	Score	Result
1	Michael HarPaz	"Tagidi"	Yes	Yes	Yes	Yes	Yes	90%	Advanced
2	Alona Erez	"Gvir Holech LeIbud"	Yes	No	No	No	No	43%	Saved
3	Agam Hazan	"Olesh (Levad Im Haroch)"	No	Yes	No	Yes	Yes	66%	Eliminated
4	Nave Levi	"Yareach"	Yes	Yes	Yes	Yes (Note: Levi was not present for this vote, so Amir Benayoun voted in his place.)	Yes	90%	Advanced
5	Noam Bettan	"LaTet VeLaKakhat"	No	Yes	Yes	Yes	Yes	84%	Advanced

==== Round of 16 ====
From this round, the judges awarded each performance a score of between 7 and 12 points, accounting for 50% of the final score, while the votes of the studio audience accounted for the remaining 50%. The two candidates with the lowest scores were up for elimination, and the judges decided who to eliminate.

Round of 16 – 13 January 2026
Draw	Artist	Song	Jury votes						Result
Draw	Artist	Song	A.A.	I.L.	E.H.	K.P.	S.M.	Total	Result
1	Michael HarPaz	"Lose Control"	10	8	10	10	8	46	Advanced
2	Shaked Solomon	"Brit Olam"	8	12	8	8	8	44	Saved
3	Gal De Paz	"Proud Mary"	8	8	12	12	10	50	Advanced
4	Alona Erez	"Idontwannabeyouanymore"	10	7	8	10	7	42	Advanced
5	Nave Levi	"Sipur Machor"	8	7	7	8	7	37	Eliminated
6	Noam Bettan	"Someone You Loved"	8	10	12	12	10	52	Advanced
7	Shira Zloof	"Million Years Ago"	10	12	12	12	12	58	Advanced

==== Quarterfinal ====
In this round, the candidates each performed a song by Hanan Ben Ari.

Quarterfinal – 15 January 2026
Draw	Artist	Song	Jury votes						Result
Draw	Artist	Song	A.A.	I.L.	E.H.	K.P.	S.M.	Total	Result
1	Gal De Paz	"Mimcha Ad Elay"	12	12	12	12	12	60	Advanced
2	Shaked Solomon	"Ma Ata Rotze Mem'ani"	10	10	8	10	8	46	Advanced
3	Alona Erez	"Shvurei Lev"	7	8	8	10	8	41	Saved
4	Michael HarPaz	"Amen Al HaYeladim"	7	7	8	8	8	38	Eliminated
5	Shira Zloof	"Im Tirtzi"	10	10	10	12	10	52	Advanced
6	Noam Bettan	"Atalef Iver"	10	12	12	12	12	58	Advanced

==== Semi-final ====
Asaf Liberman and Akiva Novick, who commentate on Eurovision for Kan, joined the judging panel for this round and the final, for which they shared one vote.

Semi-final – 17 January 2026
Draw	Artist	Song	Jury votes							Result
Draw	Artist	Song	A.N. & A.L.	A.A.	I.L.	E.H.	K.P.	S.M.	Total	Result
1	Alona Erez	"You Are the Reason"	10	12	10	10	12	10	64	Saved
2	Shaked Solomon	"Omed BaSha'ar"	10	7	10	8	10	8	53	Eliminated
3	Gal De Paz	"Oscar Winning Tears"	12	10	10	12	12	12	68	Advanced
4	Shira Zloof	"Bachum Shel Tel Aviv"	10	10	10	8	10	8	56	Advanced
5	Noam Bettan	"Formidable"	12	10	12	12	12	12	70	Advanced

==== Final ====
The final took place on 20 January 2026 and was divided into a first round, eliminating one finalist, and a superfinal among the remaining three artists, determining the winner. A public vote, held via the Kan app and determining 30% of the results of the first round, was opened after the performances in the first round of the final. In the superfinal, a 50/50 combination of jury and public votes selected Noam Bettan as the winner.

Final – 20 January 2026
Draw	Artist	Song	Jury votes							Result
Draw	Artist	Song	A.N. & A.L.	A.A.	I.L.	E.H.	K.P.	S.M.	Total	Result
1	Gal De Paz	"Fame"	12	12	12	12	12	12	72	Advanced
2	Alona Erez	"Make You Feel My Love"	12	12	12	10	12	12	70	Eliminated
3	Shira Zloof	"Ahava"	10	12	8	10	12	10	62	Advanced
4	Noam Bettan	"Nitzacht Iti HaKol"	12	10	10	12	12	12	68	Advanced

Superfinal – 20 January 2026
Draw	Artist	Song	Jury							Viewers	Total	Place
Draw	Artist	Song	A.N. & A.L.	A.A.	I.L.	E.H.	K.P.	S.M.	Total	Viewers	Total	Place
1	Shira Zloof	"Hopelessly Devoted to You"	8	8	8	8	8	8	48	26	74	3
2	Noam Bettan	"Dernière danse"	12	12	12	12	12	12	72	120	192	1
3	Gal De Paz	"All I Ask"	10	10	10	10	10	10	60	34	94	2

=== Song selection ===
The song that Noam Bettan would perform in the contest was internally selected by a professional committee. Any member of the Society of Authors, Composers and Music Publishers in Israel was able to submit entries from 21 December 2025 to 26 January 2026; submissions were required to include at least two lines of Hebrew lyrics. Bettan also submitted his own entries. Approximately 200 submissions were received at the closing of the deadline. The selected song, titled "Michelle" and written by Bettan with Nadav Aharoni, Tzlil Klifi, and Yuval Raphael, was presented on 5 March 2026 during a special broadcast on Kan 11, aired from the Neve Ilan Communications Center and hosted by Hila Korach.

== At Eurovision ==
The Eurovision Song Contest 2026 took place at the Wiener Stadthalle in Vienna, Austria, and consist of two semi-finals held on the respective dates of 12 and 14 May and the final on 16 May 2026. All nations with the exceptions of the host country and the "Big Four" (France, Germany, Italy and the United Kingdom) were required to qualify from one of two semi-finals to compete for the final; the top ten countries from each semi-final progressed to the final. On 12 January 2026, an allocation draw was held to determine which of the two semi-finals, as well as which half of the show, each country performed in; the European Broadcasting Union (EBU) split up the competing countries into different pots based on voting patterns from previous contests, with countries with favourable voting histories put into the same pot. Israel was scheduled for the second half of the first semi-final. The shows' producers then decided the running order for the semi-finals; Israel was set to perform in position 10.

The host broadcaster ORF confirmed that any boos for Israel would not be drowned out or replaced with pre-recorded applause, as they had been in the previous two years.

=== Performance ===
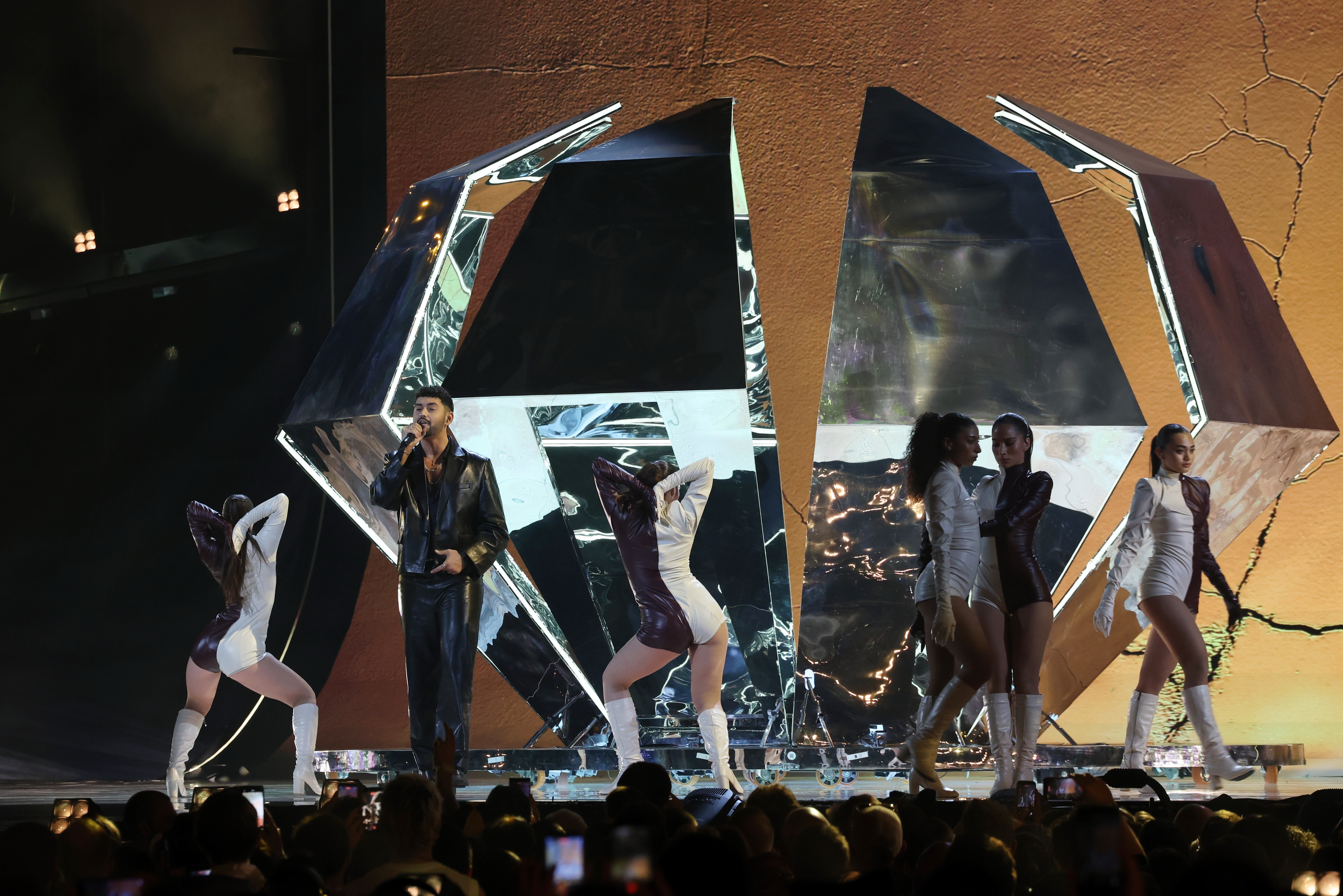
Noam Bettan during a dress rehearsal before the final

Noam Bettan took part in technical rehearsals on 3 and 7 May, followed by dress rehearsals on 11 and 12 May. His performance of "Michelle" was staged by Yuval Cohen and choreographed by Avichai Hacham, with Daniel Ben Avraham, Eden Zino, Jenia Gaponovam, Lihi Freud, and Yasmin Hachmon as supporting dancers; a large spinning "diamond" platform was featured as the central element of the staging.

=== Controversies ===
==== Advertising campaigns ====
As part of changes to the contest's voting system in response to Israel's result the previous year, voting instructions were updated to "discourage disproportionate promotion campaigns… particularly when undertaken or supported by third parties, including governments or governmental agencies". Despite this, ahead of the first semi-final, reports circulated of the Israeli delegation again issuing promotional videos in several languages which instructed viewers to give the maximum 10 votes for Israel. The director of the Eurovision Song Contest, Martin Green, stated that he was made aware of the videos, as well as that Kan was given a formal warning. Kan later responded that the video was not backed by third-parties, and also cited similar advertising campaigns by other countries' delegations; despite that, the Israeli delegation took down the videos per the EBU's request.

==== Social media post on Croatia's performance ====
The Croatian representatives, Lelek, posted on their Instagram that they were "disturbed" by a social media post by Kan about their performance with the caption, "When you overdo it with the henna tattoos in Eilat". Lelek stated, "We are disturbed by the comments made by the Israeli broadcaster KAN, in which our culture and the sacrifices made by oppressed Catholic women were mocked. It is especially disturbing to ridicule women singing about female pain and suffering while showing such a complete lack of empathy and respect for the suffering of others". Kan later removed the post and issued an apology.

=== Semi-final ===
Israel performed in position 10, following the entry from Estonia and before the entry from Belgium. During the performance, there were pro-Palestine chants and booing, with some audience members removed. At the end of the show, the country was announced as a qualifier for the final. It was later revealed that Israel placed first out of the fifteen participating countries in the first semi-final with 269 points; 163 points from the public televoting and 106 points from the juries.

=== Final ===
Following the semi-final, Israel drew producer's choice for the final. Israel performed in position 3, following the entry from Germany and before the entry from Belgium. Bettan once again took part in dress rehearsals on 15 and 16 May before the final, including the jury final where the professional juries cast their final votes before the live show on 16 May. Israel placed second in the final, scoring 343 points; 220 points from the public televoting and 123 points from the juries.

=== Voting ===
==== Points awarded to Israel ====
Points awarded to Israel (Semi-final 1)
Score	Televote	Jury
12 points	Georgia; Germany; Moldova; Portugal; San Marino	Croatia; Moldova; Serbia
10 points	Belgium; Estonia; Finland; Greece; Italy; Rest of the World; Sweden	Lithuania; Poland; San Marino
8 points	Montenegro; Poland	Belgium
7 points		Germany
6 points	Croatia; Serbia	Finland
5 points	Lithuania	Georgia
4 points		Estonia; Greece; Sweden
3 points		
2 points		Portugal
1 point		

Points awarded to Israel (Final)
Score	Televote	Jury
12 points	Azerbaijan; Finland; France; Germany; Portugal; Switzerland	Poland
10 points	Albania; Georgia; United Kingdom	Moldova; Ukraine
8 points	Belgium; Cyprus; Italy; Moldova	Albania; Austria; Lithuania
7 points	Armenia; Austria; Malta; Sweden	Armenia; Bulgaria; Denmark
6 points	Rest of the World; Romania	Georgia; Romania
5 points	Bulgaria; Czechia; Greece; Norway; Ukraine	Croatia
4 points	Latvia; Montenegro; Serbia	Azerbaijan; France; Malta; San Marino; Serbia
3 points	San Marino	Germany
2 points	Denmark; Poland	Czechia; Switzerland
1 point	Estonia; Luxembourg	Belgium; Norway

==== Points awarded by Israel ====
Points awarded by Israel (Semi-final 1)
Score	Televote	Jury
12 points	Moldova	Poland
10 points	Greece	Finland
8 points	San Marino	Belgium
7 points	Croatia	Greece
6 points	Poland	Estonia
5 points	Finland	Moldova
4 points	Belgium	Portugal
3 points	Estonia	Sweden
2 points	Montenegro	San Marino
1 point	Serbia	Georgia

Points awarded by Israel (Final)
Score	Televote	Jury
12 points	Bulgaria	Australia
10 points	Australia	Denmark
8 points	Moldova	Bulgaria
7 points	Italy	Finland
6 points	Denmark	Moldova
5 points	Greece	Greece
4 points	Ukraine	Romania
3 points	Romania	Italy
2 points	France	Belgium
1 point	Albania	Albania

==== Detailed voting results ====
Each participating broadcaster assembles a seven-member jury panel consisting of music industry professionals who are citizens of the country they represent and two of which have to be between 18 and 25 years old. Each jury, and individual jury member, is required to meet a strict set of criteria regarding professional background, as well as diversity in gender and age. No member of a national jury was permitted to be related in any way to any of the competing acts in such a way that they cannot vote impartially and independently. The individual rankings of each jury member as well as the nation's televoting results were released shortly after the grand final.

The following members comprised the Israeli jury:

- Ido Porath
- Noy Ben Haim (juror B in the final)
- Ohad Hitman
- Roi Delmedigo
- Lihi Mayra Toledano (juror E in the final)
- Mei Finegold (represented Israel in 2014)
- Michaela Hazani (juror C in the final)

Detailed voting results from Israel (Semi-final 1)
R/O	Country	Jury									Televote	
R/O	Country	Juror A	Juror B	Juror C	Juror D	Juror E	Juror F	Juror G	Rank	Points	Rank	Points
01	Moldova	5	6	6	11	4	7	5	6	5	1	12
02	Sweden	7	8	10	12	9	5	6	8	3	14	
03	Croatia	12	11	12	7	13	14	11	12		4	7
04	Greece	4	2	1	13	2	4	4	4	7	2	10
05	Portugal	9	7	8	10	7	6	7	7	4	11	
06	Georgia	10	12	9	4	10	12	14	10	1	12	
07	Finland	1	3	4	5	1	3	1	2	10	6	5
08	Montenegro	13	10	13	6	12	11	13	11		9	2
09	Estonia	6	5	5	3	6	10	8	5	6	8	3
10	Israel											
11	Belgium	2	4	3	1	5	1	3	3	8	7	4
12	Lithuania	11	14	11	9	11	13	10	13		13	
13	San Marino	8	9	7	8	8	8	9	9	2	3	8
14	Poland	3	1	2	2	3	2	2	1	12	5	6
15	Serbia	14	13	14	14	14	9	12	14		10	1

Detailed voting results from Israel (Final)
R/O	Country	Jury									Televote	
R/O	Country	Juror A	Noy Ben Haim	Michaela Hazani	Juror D	Lihi Mayra Toledano	Juror F	Juror G	Rank	Points	Rank	Points
01	Denmark	2	3	1	7	1	1	5	2	10	5	6
02	Germany	20	15	17	15	14	11	13	16		15	
03	Israel											
04	Belgium	13	10	6	4	10	10	11	9	2	19	
05	Albania	12	4	10	10	5	18	12	10	1	10	1
06	Greece	8	6	8	6	7	6	9	6	5	6	5
07	Ukraine	21	20	20	14	19	23	20	21		7	4
08	Australia	1	1	2	2	3	2	1	1	12	2	10
09	Serbia	23	23	23	16	23	21	23	22		17	
10	Malta	17	16	18	19	17	20	19	20		16	
11	Czechia	7	14	9	8	12	12	15	13		14	
12	Bulgaria	5	2	3	1	4	5	3	3	8	1	12
13	Croatia	22	24	24	24	24	22	24	24		11	
14	United Kingdom	19	12	19	20	22	19	21	19		22	
15	France	10	17	11	18	11	16	16	15		9	2
16	Moldova	6	8	7	9	9	7	2	5	6	3	8
17	Finland	3	18	4	5	2	4	7	4	7	12	
18	Poland	9	21	13	3	8	8	18	11		20	
19	Lithuania	24	19	22	23	18	24	22	23		21	
20	Sweden	15	22	21	13	20	17	14	18		24	
21	Cyprus	18	7	12	22	6	14	8	12		13	
22	Italy	16	5	5	12	13	9	6	8	3	4	7
23	Norway	11	13	14	11	15	13	10	14		18	
24	Romania	4	9	15	21	16	3	4	7	4	8	3
25	Austria	14	11	16	17	21	15	17	17		23	
