= Rakata (disambiguation) =

Rakata is a volcanic cone on the Indonesian island of Krakatoa; also a synonym for that island.

Rakata may also refer to:

- Rakata (Star Wars), a race in the fictional Star Wars universe
- "Rakata" (song), a song by reggaeton artists Wisin y Yandel
- "Rakata", a song by Arca which is featured on Kick II
- "Rakata" a song by Israeli composer-songwriter Tzlil Klifi
