= Noam Bettan =

Israeli singer (born 1998)

Noam Bettan נועם בתן
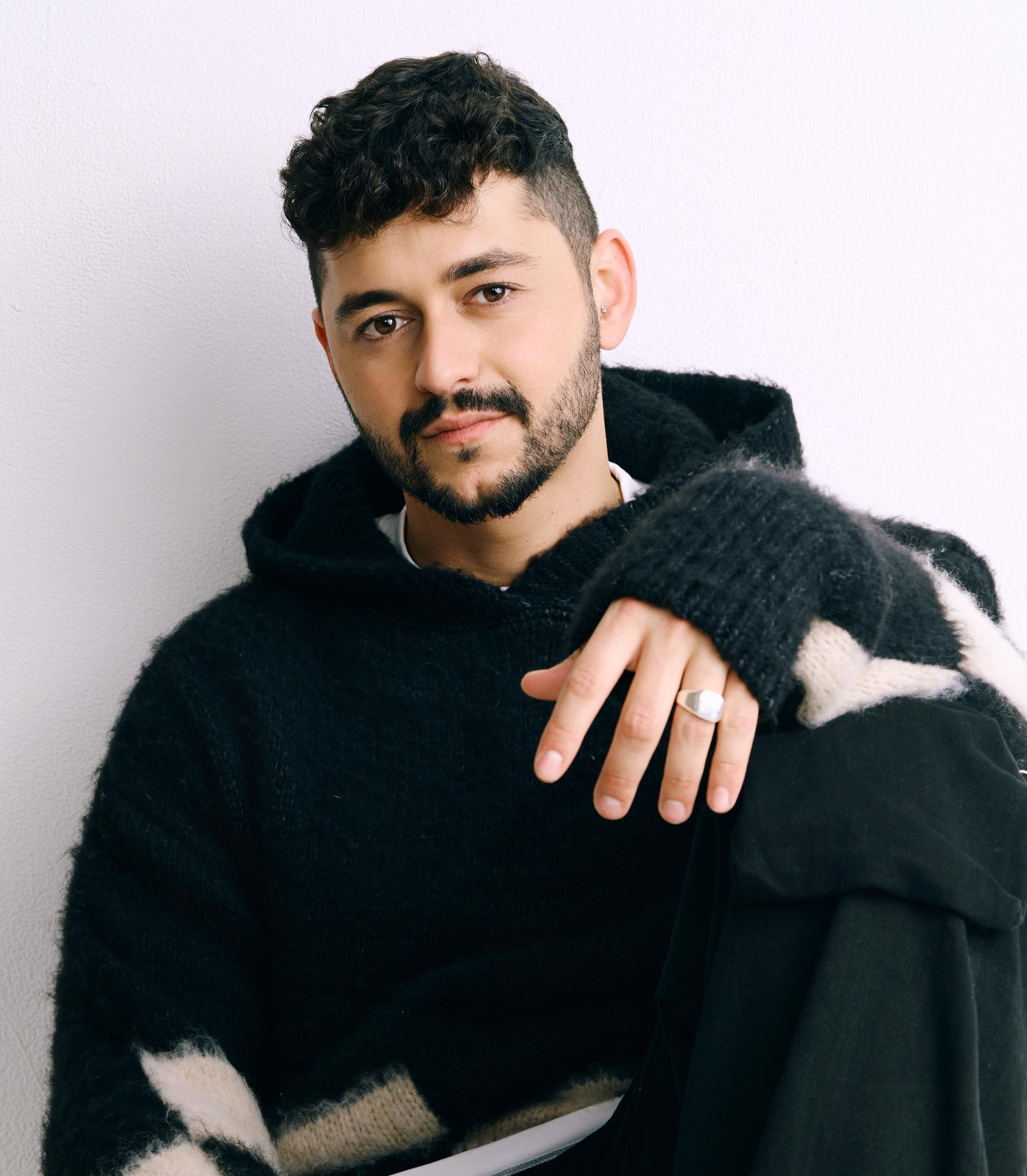
- Bettan in 2025

Background information
- Born: 5 March 1998 (age 28); Ra'anana, Israel
- Genres: Pop; indie pop; R&B; neo soul; mizrahi music
- Occupations: Singer; songwriter
- Instruments: Vocals; piano; guitar
- Years active: 2017–present
- Labels: D-Music; Zahav Music

Noam Bettan (Note: Hebrew: נועם בתן, pronounced [ˈnoʔam beˈtan]) (born 5 March 1998) is an Israeli singer and songwriter. In 2026, he won the 12th season of the Israeli singing competition Rising Star (HaKokhav HaBa). He represented Israel in the Eurovision Song Contest 2026 with the song "Michelle", finishing in second place.

== Biography ==
Bettan was born in Ra'anana, Israel, to a French Jewish family of Algerian descent who immigrated to Israel from Grenoble, France. His parents are Ofer and Corinne, and he has two older brothers. He is fluent in Hebrew, French and English.

== Music career ==
Bettan began his music career after completing his compulsory military service in the Israel Defense Forces (IDF). In 2018, he came in third place on Israel's televised music program Aviv or Eyal. Three years later, he began work on his debut album. From this album, titled Me'al HaMayim, he released several successful singles: "Ahavot leYom Ehad", "Ba'ir Sheli" and "KO".

Further single releases from the album in 2022–2023 included "Buba," which reached No. 3 on Israel's Galgalatz radio charts. In 2023, he also released "Sakin BaLev" and "Lahzor HaBaita."

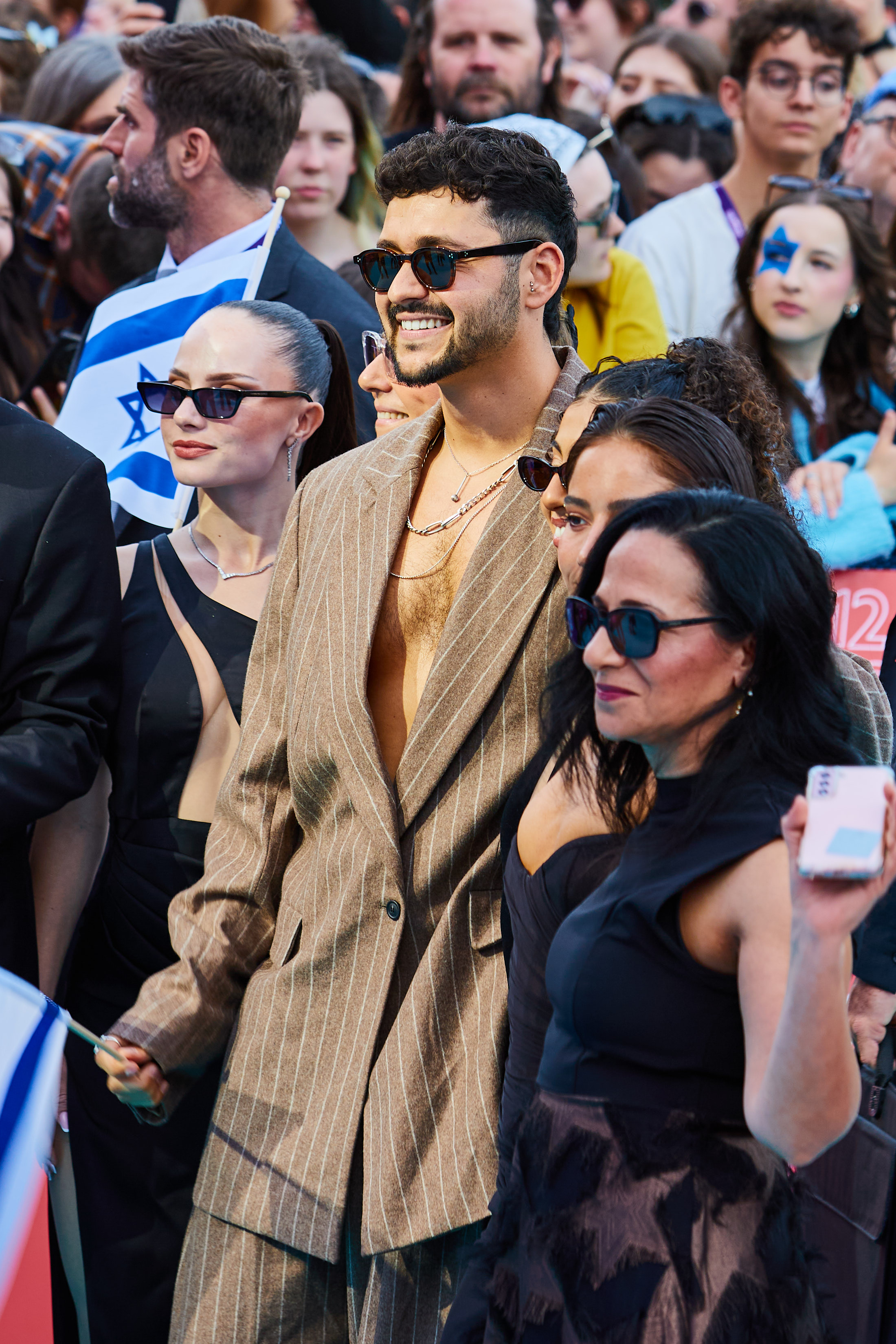
Noam Bettan during the Eurovision Song Contest 2026 opening ceremony

In 2024, Bettan participated in tribute projects and released the single "Pokeach Einayim," based on a poem by an Israeli soldier, Yaron Oree Shay, who was killed in the October 7 attacks. In 2025, he released the singles "Madame" and "Sheva Dakot Be-Gan Eden."

In January 2026, Bettan won the 12th season of the TV music competition Rising Star (HaKokhav HaBa), thus becoming Israel's representative in the Eurovision Song Contest 2026. His song for the event, "Michelle", was released on 5 March. Yuval Raphael, Israel's Eurovision contestant from the previous year, was a co-writer.

Speaking ahead of the contest about representing Israel amidst controversy over his country's participation due to the Gaza war, Bettan said, "It's entering the lion's den," adding, "But I can say that seeing those few Israeli flags in the audience — you look at that, and you know that you have a whole nation behind you, and you're their voice. It’s truly a privilege." His performance in the semi-final was marked by some booing and disruption, in which two people were removed from the hall. Bettan was supported by some fellow participants, including Boy George, representing San Marino, and the Bulgarian singer Dara, who won the contest. Bettan ultimately finished in second place in the final, coming in third place in the public vote and eighth in the jury ranking. Following the contest, Bettan was received by President Isaac Herzog.

Noam performed 5 sold out shows at Barby, announced just days after his second place ranking. Tickets sold out within the hour of each show's announcement. The shows took place on August 10, 12, 13, 15, and 16. Following his successful run at the venue, Noam announced his first-ever career headlining concert at the Menora Mivtachim Arena in Tel Aviv set for September 28. It became a career milestone as Bettan officially sold out the 10,000+ capacity arena show on September 10.

== Influences ==
French music is a core part of Bettan's identity. He has specifically mentioned the Belgian artist Stromae as a key influence (especially noticeable in the rhythmic and electronic-leaning side of tracks like “Michelle”). Bettan also cites French-language artists such as Christophe Maé, Amir Haddad, and others in the chanson/pop tradition.

Noam has spoken highly of past Israeli Eurovision winner Netta Barzilai and about her artistic vision and creativity, saying he can “see the artistic thought process of hers going in every possible direction.” He also expressed appreciation when she covered one of his songs.

Beyond named artists, Bettan has said he enjoys music in Hebrew and draws from the broader Israeli pop and emotional ballad tradition, while his own style remains more heavily shaped by French and international pop/R&B influences. He has also performed and covered Israeli songs (such as Amir Benayoun’s “Nitzachta Iti Hakol”) during competitions.

== Discography ==
=== Studio albums ===
List of studio albums, with selected details
Title	Details
Me'al HaMayim	Released: 12 March 2023; Labels: D-Music, Zahav Music; Formats: Digital download, streaming

=== Charted singles ===
==== As lead artist ====
Title	Year	Peak chart positions										Album
Title	Year	ISR	ISR Air.	ISR TV Air.	AUT	GRE Int.	LTU	SWE	SWI	UK Sales	US World Sales	Album
"Ahavot LeYom Echad"	2021	88	—	—	—	—	—	—	—	—	—	Me'al HaMayim
"Hayom"	2022	79	—	—	—	—	—	—	—	—	—	Me'al HaMayim
"Buba"	2022	39	—	—	—	—	—	—	—	—	—	Me'al HaMayim
"Madame"	2025	2	6	— (Note: "Madame" did not enter the general Israeli TV Airplay Chart, but peaked at number 5 on the Israeli Domestic TV Airplay.)	—	—	—	—	—	—	—	Non-album singles
"Michelle"	2026	1	1	3	16	15	23	39	55	55	4	Non-album singles
"Tamid Ratziti Od"	2026	47	4	— (Note: "Tamid Ratziti Od" did not enter the general Israeli TV Airplay Chart, but peaked at number 5 on the Israeli Domestic TV Airplay.)	—	—	—	—	—	—	—	Non-album singles
"—" denotes a recording that did not chart or was not released in that territory.

=== Other charted songs ===
==== As lead artist ====
Title	Year	Peak chart positions	Album or EP
Title	Year	ISR	Album or EP
"Madame + Yechola Levad" (with Odeya; live at Ramat Gan Stadium)	2026	53	Non-album songs
"Baier Sheli" (with Eden Hason; live at Menora Mivtachim Arena)	2026	88	Non-album songs

=== Charted covers ===
==== As lead artist ====
Title	Year	Peak chart positions	Album or EP
Title	Year	ISR	Album or EP
"Atelef Iver"	2024	50	Live
"Ahava Chola"	2025	57	HaKokhav HaBa Season 12
"Leylot VeKlalot"	2025	77	HaKokhav HaBa Season 12
"Buba" (HaKokhav HaBa cover)	2025	66	HaKokhav HaBa Season 12
"Letat velkachat"	2026	100	HaKokhav HaBa Season 12
"Formidable"	2026	71	HaKokhav HaBa Season 12
"Dernière danse"	2026	78	HaKokhav HaBa Season 12

== Notes ==
Awards and achievements
Preceded by Yuval Raphael	HaKokhav HaBa winner 2026	Succeeded by TBD
Preceded by Yuval Raphael with "New Day Will Rise"	Israel in the Eurovision Song Contest; 2026	Succeeded by TBD
