= Lars Lerin =

Swedish painter and author (born 1954)

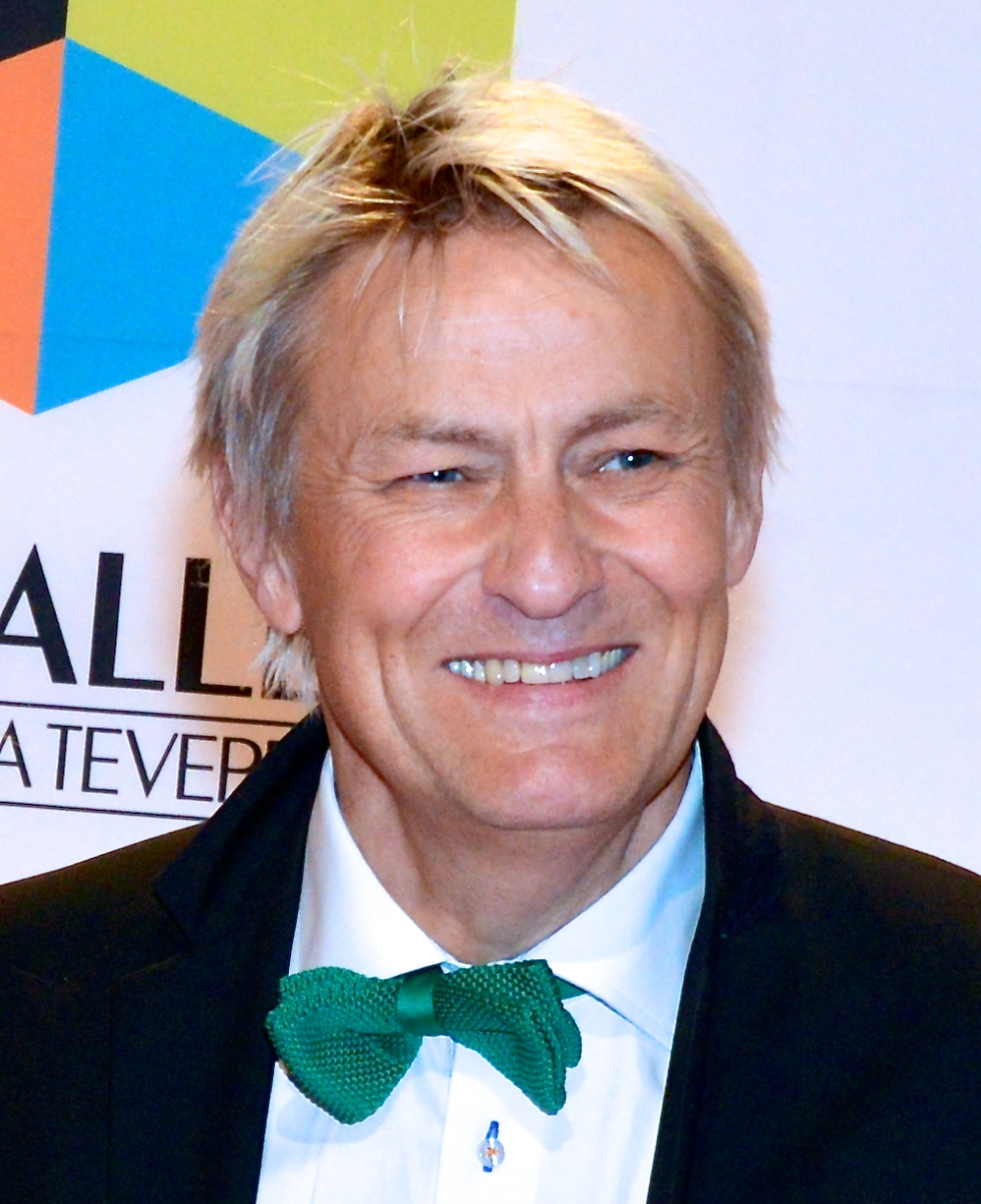
- Lerin in 2013
- Born: Lars Ivar Lerin; 2 April 1954 (age 72); Munkfors, Sweden
- Spouse: Junior Lerin (m. 2009)
- Children: 4

Lars Lerin (born 2 April 1954) is a Swedish artist, author, painter, television personality and presenter. He won the August Prize in 2014. He is known for many exhibitions, as well as his work as television presenter for many television series on Sveriges Television.

== Biography ==
Lerin grew up in Munkfors in Värmland as the son of bandy player Jonny Lerin (1928–2020), and his mother Gerd Lerin (1930–2022). He studied at Gerlesborgsskolan in Bohuslän between 1974−1975 with Arne Isacsson as his mentor in painting. And later studies at Valands konsthögskola in Gothenburg between 1980 and 1984. During a short time he also studied the arts in Stockholm.

He then moved to Lofoten, but moved back to Värmland in 2000. His art work has been on display in museums in countries like Norway, Iceland, Germany and the United States.

An art exhibition at Waldermarsudde in Stockholm in 2008/2009 was visited by over 100 000 people. Lerins art is shown at museums, and government buildings in both Sweden and Norway, in museums like Moderna Museet, Nordiska Akvarellmuseet and Värmlands museum.

In Karlstad the art hall Sandgrund has been transformed into a Lars Lerin-museum with a lot of his work on display.

Lars Lerin was a ”Sommarpratare” in Sommar i P1 on Sveriges Radio in 2012 where he told about his life and career.

He won the August Prize in 2014 for the non-fiction book Naturlära. In January 2016, Lerin presented the series ”Vänligen Lars Lerin” which was broadcast on SVT, where he interviewed people about the different road life can take. The same year he was awarded the Kristallen-award for TV personality of the Year.

In 2018, Lerin presented the SVT documentary series Lerins lärlingar, where he taught painting to several people with different disabilities. In 2022, Lerin took part in ”Stjärnorna på slottet” wherehe told about his life and career.

== Personal life ==
Lerin married photographer Manoel "Junior" Marques in August 2009. They have four children, including twin daughters.

While living and working in Lofoten, he was suffering from mental health issues and alcoholism while being in a relationship with painter Yngve Henriksen.
