= Michelle (Noam Bettan song) =

2026 single by Noam Bettan

Single by Noam Bettan
- Language: Hebrew; French; English
- Released: 5 March 2026
- Length: 3:00
- Producer: Nadav Aharoni

Noam Bettan singles chronology
"Close Your Eyes" (2025)	"Michelle" (2026)	"Tamid Ratziti Od" (2026)

Music video
- "Michelle" on YouTube

Eurovision Song Contest 2026 entry
- Country: Israel
- Artist: Noam Bettan
- Languages: Hebrew; French; English
- Composers: Nadav Aharoni; Tzlil Klifi
- Lyricists: Nadav Aharoni; Noam Bettan; Tzlil Klifi; Yuval Raphael

Finals performance
- Semi-final result: 1st
- Semi-final points: 269
- Final result: 2nd
- Final points: 343

Entry chronology
- ◄ "New Day Will Rise" (2025)

Official performance video
- "Michelle" (First Semi-Final) on YouTube "Michelle" (Grand Final) on YouTube

"Michelle" (Hebrew: מישל) is a song by the Israeli singer and songwriter Noam Bettan. It was released on 5 March 2026 and represented Israel in the Eurovision Song Contest 2026, and finished in second place.

== Composition and release ==
"Michelle" was produced by Nadav Aharoni and composed by Aharoni, Tzlil Klifi, with lyrics written by Aharoni, Bettan, Klifi, and Yuval Raphael. The song premiered on 5 March 2026 during a special broadcast on Kan 11.

"Michelle" has been described as an 'upbeat love song' by Israeli media, and combines English, French, and Hebrew, similar to Raphael's entry for Israel in the previous year's Eurovision, "New Day Will Rise". According to the Israeli broadcaster Kan, the song "tells the story of choosing to break free from a toxic emotional cycle. It's a story about emotional growth and maturity, at the moment when the protagonist realises they must let go and choose a new path for themselves." Some believe the song is also a metaphor for the complex relationship between the Jewish people and Europe, characterised as a toxic love affair.

== Eurovision Song Contest 2026 ==
The Eurovision Song Contest 2026 took place at Wiener Stadthalle in Vienna, Austria, and consisted of two semi-finals held on the respective dates of 12 and 14 May and the final on 16 May 2026. The song progressed to the final on 12 May 2026 following the first semi-final. The song won the second place at the finals, placing third in the popular vote and eighth in the jury rankings.

== Charts ==
=== Weekly charts ===
2026 weekly chart performance
Chart (2026)	Peak position
Austria (Ö3 Austria Top 40)	16
Greece International (IFPI)	15
Israel (Mako Hitlist)	1
Israel Airplay (Media Forest)	1
Israel TV Airplay (Media Forest)	3
Israel Domestic TV Airplay (Media Forest)	2
Lithuania (AGATA)	23
Sweden (Sverigetopplistan)	39
Switzerland (Schweizer Hitparade)	55
UK Singles Sales (OCC)	55
US World Digital Song Sales (Billboard)	4

=== Year-end charts ===
2026 year-end chart performance
Chart (2026)	Peak position
Israel (Mako Hitlist)	18
