= Tzlil Klifi =

Israeli singer, songwriter and composer (born 1989)

Tzlil Klifi

Tzlil Klifi (Hebrew: צליל קליפי; born 15 July 1989), also Tslil Klifi, Tslil Kalifi, etc. is an Israeli songwriter, composer and singer.

== Biography ==
She was born in the moshav Nir Yafeh and started her music career in 2002, singing with the band צעירי ניר העמק, Tzeirei Nir haEmek, 'Nir haEmek Youth' of the Nir haEmek Youth Village. In 2007 she enlisted in the IDF as a singer in the להקת "פיקוד מזרח", Lehakat "Pikud Mizrah" ensemble of the Education and Youth Corps, discharging in 2009. She began writing and composing during her military service. After discharging she moved to Rishon LeZion and started working on her own album. In 2011, being 22 year old, she released her debut single, לא מזיז לך, la meziz lech, '"It Doesn't Move You"', which she wrote and composed.

== Notable songs ==
The song "Rakata", for which she contributed lyrics and music, was among the 4 finalist songs in the 2019/2020 Rising Star competition show (the Israeli selection event for the Eurovision Song Contest 2020, cancelled due to COVID-19) to be performed by Eden Alene.

She co-wrote the song "Marionette", with which Inbal Bibi took the third place in the The X Factor Israel season 4 reality show, whose winner was to represent Israel at Eurovision 2022.

She wrote the song Walking with You (lyrics and music), released in 2021, with which the singer Narkis received the 2022 ACUM Award "Achievement of the Year" for a song.

Tzlil Klifi took part in composing and writing lyrics to the song Michelle, which premiered on 5 March 2026 and with which the Israeli singer and songwriter Noam Bettan represented Israel in the Eurovision Song Contest 2026, finishing in second place.

== Awards ==
- 2025: ACUM Awards: Lyricist's Achievement of the Year Award; from the citation: "has established herself as one of the most prominent songwriters of the new generation"
