= Believe Me (Greczula song) =

Single by Greczula

from the album Greczula
- Released: 14 February 2025
- Length: 2:59
- Label: Warner
- Songwriters: Amanda Nordelius; John Russel; Kristofer Greczula
- Producers: John Russel; Kristofer Greczula; Oliver Lundström

Greczula singles chronology
"Stronger" (2022)	"Believe Me" (2025)

"Believe Me" is a song by Swedish singer Greczula, released as a single on 14 February 2025. It was performed in Melodifestivalen 2025. It finished first in its heat, advancing to the finals, where it was the third song performed in the final. It finished 5th in the jury vote, and third on the televote, and finished 3rd overall.

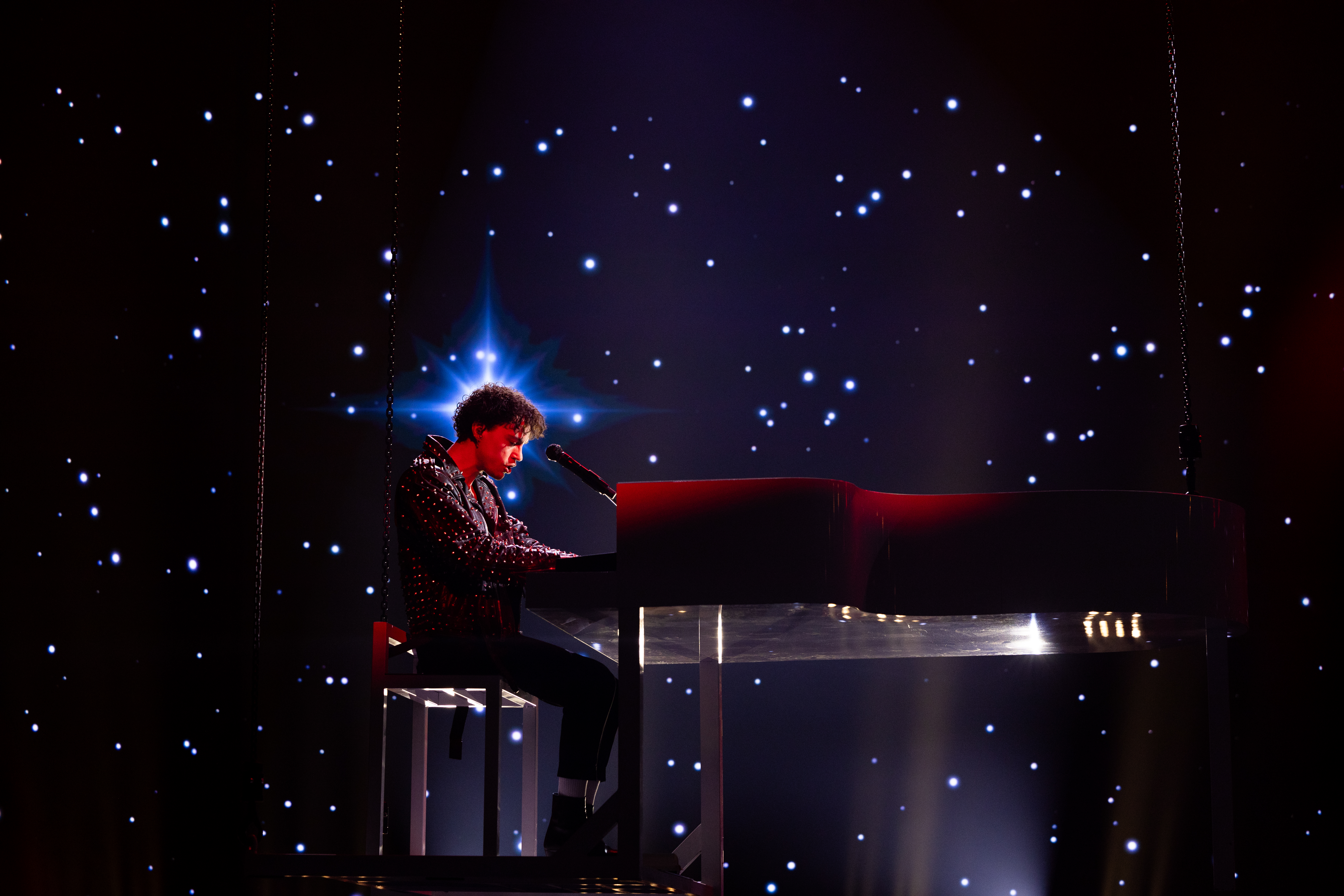
Greczula performing "Believe Me"

== Charts ==
=== Weekly charts ===
Weekly chart performance for "Believe Me"
Chart (2025)	Peak position
Sweden (Sverigetopplistan)	5

=== Year-end charts ===
Year-end chart performance for "Believe Me"
Chart (2025)	Position
Sweden (Sverigetopplistan)	82
