= Den känslan =

Single by Linnea Henriksson
- Released: 31 January 2025
- Length: 2:47
- Label: Sony Music
- Songwriters: David Lindgren Zacharias; Linnea Henriksson; Sebastian Atas

"Den känslan" is a Swedish-language song by Swedish singer Linnea Henriksson, released as a single on 31 January 2025. The song was performed in Melodifestivalen 2025.

== Charts ==
Chart performance for "Den känslan"
Chart (2025)	Peak position
Sweden (Sverigetopplistan)	32
