= Manoel Marques Lerin =

Swedish photographer (born 1977)

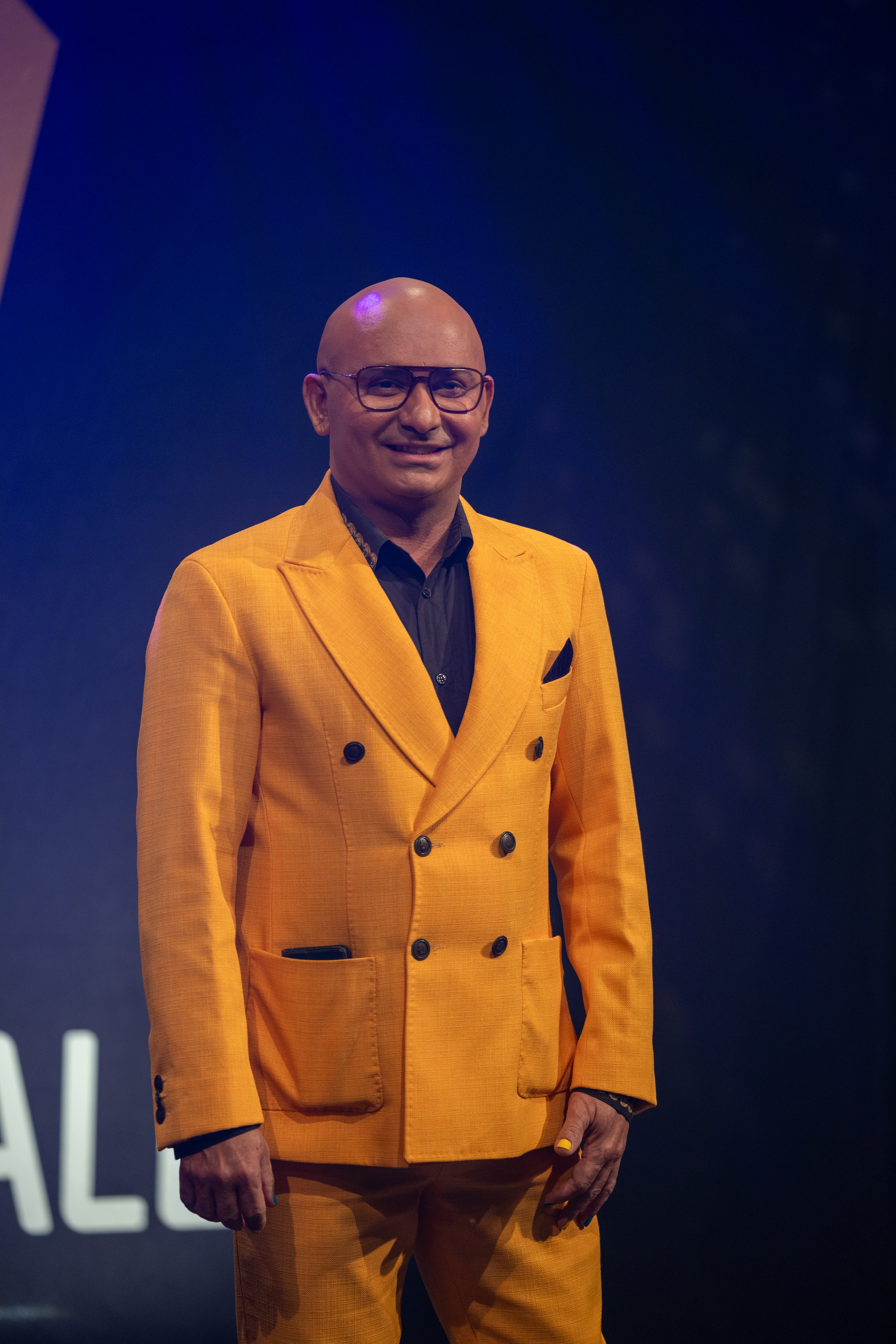
- Lerin in 2025
- Born: Manoel Marques Lerin; 28 March 1977 (age 49); Piauí, Brazil
- Other name: Junior Lerin

Manoel Marques Lerin, known as Junior Lerin (born 28 March 1977) is a Swedish photographer, singer and television personality. In 2015, he published the photography book Barn i Moçambique in 2015. In 2022, he was a contestant on the Kanal 5 show Herre på täppan. In 2025, he participated as a celebrity dancer on Let's Dance 2025, which was broadcast on TV4. He performed the song "Copacabana Boy" in Melodifestivalen 2026.

Since 2009, he is married to Swedish artist Lars Lerin.

== Discography ==
=== Singles ===
| Title | Year | Peak chart positions | Album |
| Title | Year | SWE | Album |
|---|---|---|---|
| "Copacabana Boy" | 2026 | 5 | Non-album single |
