= Half of Me (Greczula song) =

Single by Greczula
- Released: 31 January 2026
- Length: 2:58
- Label: Universal Music AB
- Songwriters: Andreas Werling; Karl Ivert; Kian Sang; Kristofer Greczula

Greczula singles chronology
| "På egna ben" (2025) | "Half of Me" (2026) |

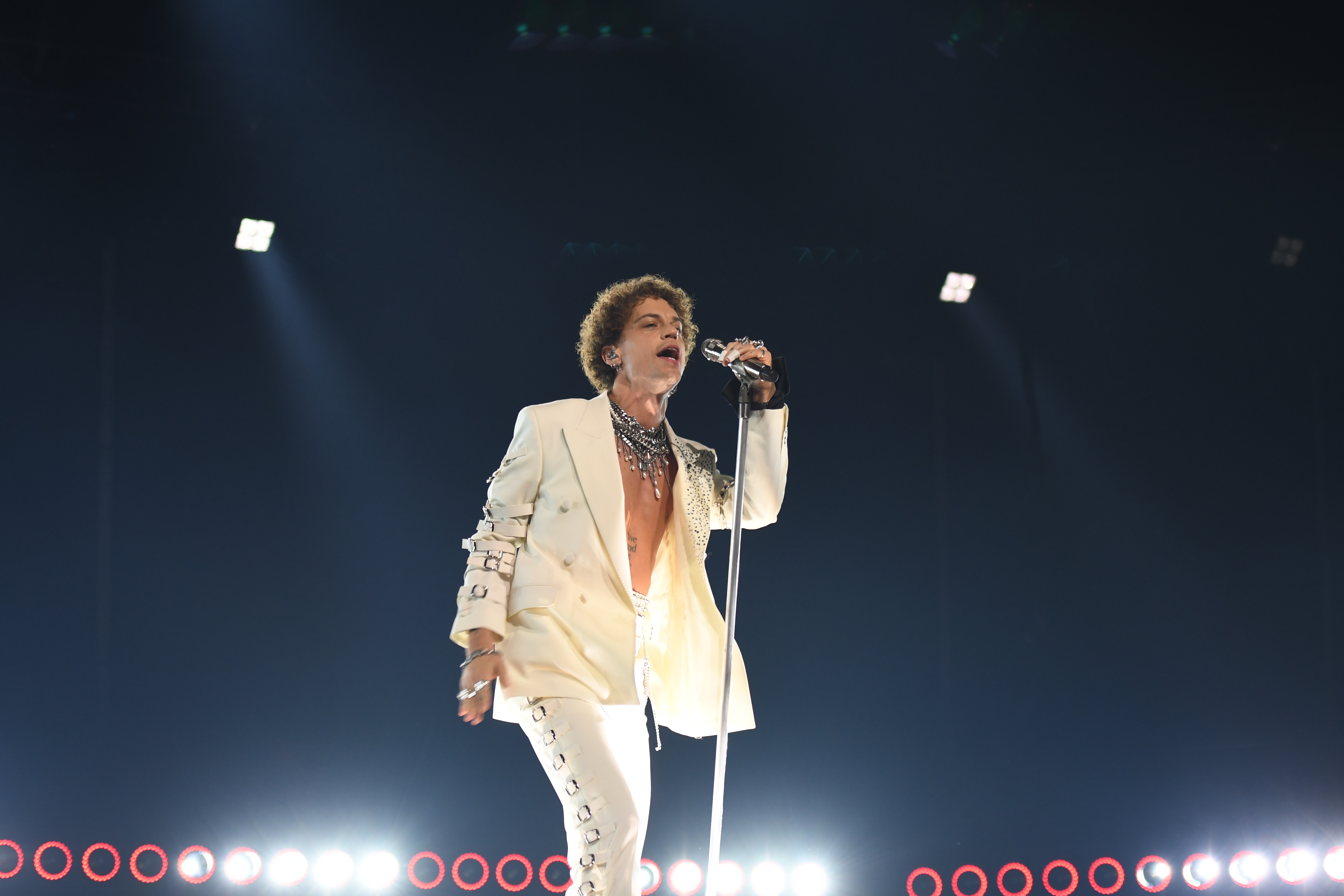
The song performed during the rehearsals for the Melodifestivalen final.

"Half of Me" is a song by Swedish singer Greczula, released as a single on 31 January 2026. The song was performed in Melodifestivalen 2026. It qualified for the final, where it placed second with 134 points. It debuted at number six in Sweden.

== Charts ==
Chart performance for "Half of Me"
| Chart (2026) | Peak position |
|---|---|
| Sweden (Sverigetopplistan) | 6 |

== Certifications ==
Certifications for "Half of Me"
| Region | Certification | Certified units/sales |
Streaming
| Sweden (GLF) | Gold | 6,000,000^{†} |
^{†} Streaming-only figures based on certification alone.
