= Linnea Henriksson =

Swedish singer and songwriter (born 1986)

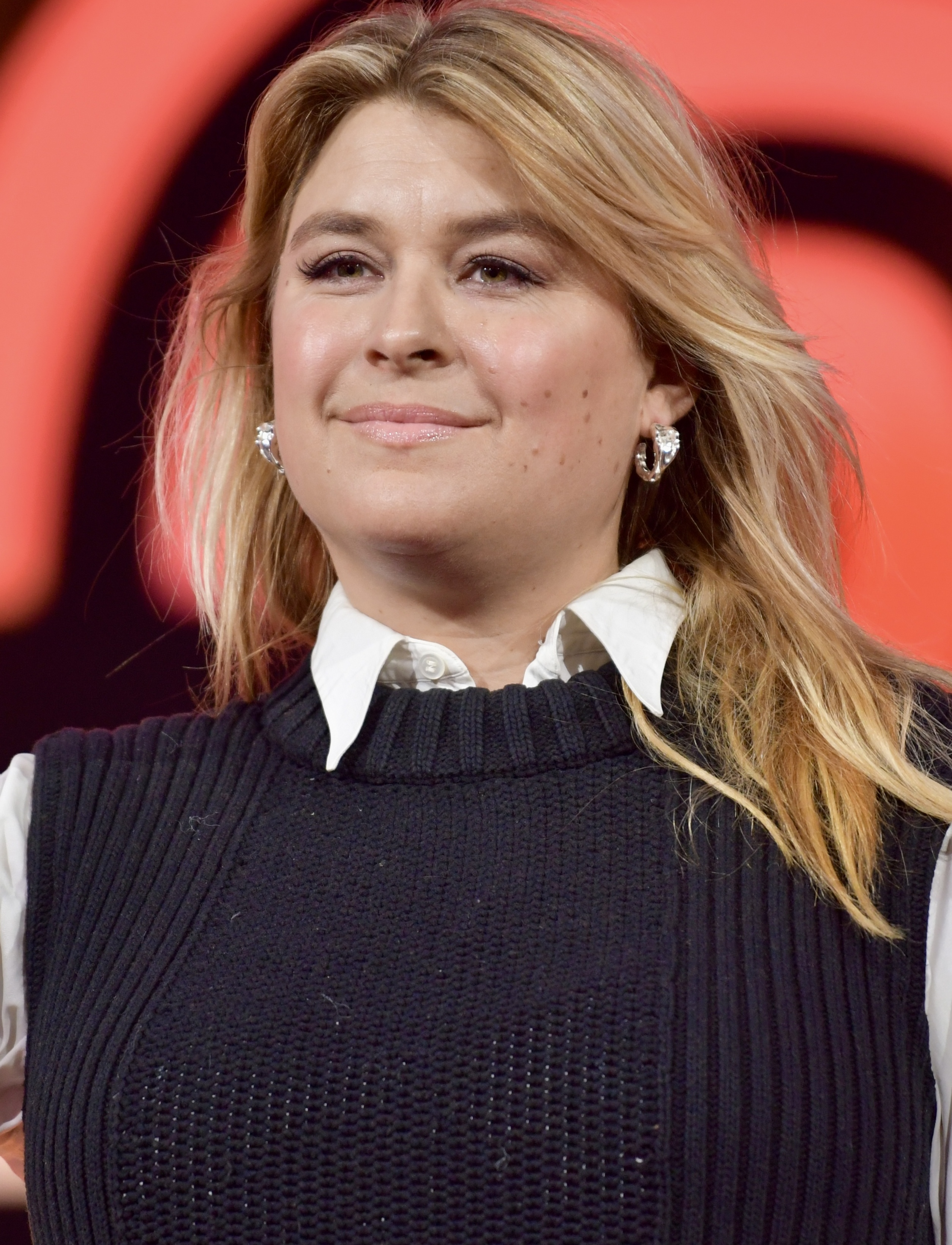
- Henriksson during Melodifestivalen 2025

Background information
- Born: Ellen Linnea Petrea Henriksson; 9 November 1986 (age 39)
- Origin: Halmstad, Sweden
- Genres: Pop, jazz
- Occupations: Singer; songwriter
- Instrument: Vocals
- Years active: 2010–present
- Labels: Sony Music, Epic

Ellen Linnea Petrea Henriksson (born 9 November 1986) is a Swedish singer and songwriter who participated in Idol 2010 in which she placed fourth. As of April 2018, she is also the lead singer of the jazz band Prylf. In 2012, Henriksson released her first music album, which she co-wrote and co-produced with singer Orup. During mid-2013, Henriksson toured Sweden with the band Gyllene Tider.

== Early life ==
Henriksson was born in Halmstad, Sweden. Her public debut occurred in 1995 when she participated in the TV4 televised singing show Småstjärnorna. She studied music at Skurups folkhögskola. In 2007, she started the jazz band Prylf and became the band's lead singer. In 2010, Prylf released their only album, Kind of Green.

== 2010–present: Idol 2010 and Gyllene Tider ==
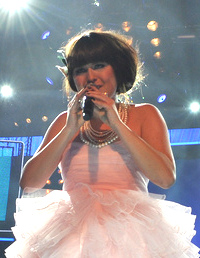
Henriksson during Idol 2010.

From August to December 2010, Henriksson participated in the singing competition Idol 2010, which was broadcast on TV4. She finished in fourth place and later that year signed a record deal with Sony Music and Epic. During her time on Idol she was among the final twelve contestants during a qualification week and was voted into the Top 12 along with singer Geir Rönning during the broadcast. Henriksson was one of the least-popular two contestants during her time on Idol 2010; she had to sing-off with Elin Blom and retained her place in the competition by attracting more public votes than Blom.

In 2011, Henriksson released her first solo music single "Väldigt kär/Obegripligt ensam", which she co-wrote and co-produced with Orup. Parts of Henriksson's first solo music album Till mina älskade och älskare, which was released on 30 May 2012, were also co-written with Orup. During mid-2012, Henriksson went on a summer tour around Sweden; later that year she embarked upon an extended music tour to several Swedish cities.

On 19 January 2013, Henriksson was voted "Artist of the Year 2012" by listeners to radio station P3 for its yearly P3 Gold gala, receiving the most votes. From June to August 2013, Henriksson joined the music tour of the band Gyllene Tider, which toured around Sweden, as their opening act. In late July 2013, Henriksson became the first live act to perform at the new Tele2 Arena in Stockholm; she was the opening act for Gyllene Tider. Henriksson's songs have been included on several music compilation albums.

Henriksson's song "Enastående" was included in the soundtrack to the Swedish movie Once Upon a Time in Phuket. She collaborated with Avicii in his song "Hope There's Someone", which is included in his debut album True. On 8 December 2014, Henriksson was one of the hosts of Musikhjälpen 2014. In 2018, she appeared on Så mycket bättre which is broadcast on TV4.

On 3 September 2019, Henriksson was announced as a presenter of Melodifestivalen 2020 along with Lina Hedlund and David Sundin.

Henriksson was going to be one of the commentators for Eurovision Song Contest 2022 for SVT but announced on 10 May that she had tested positive for COVID-19 and would not be a commentator for the semifinals. Her co-commentator Edward af Sillén would commentate the semifinal alone in Turin, then both af Sillén and Henriksson would commentate the final from an SVT studio in Stockholm.

In 2025, Henriksson competed in Melodifestivalen. She performed in the first heat with the song "Den känslan" where she failed to qualify to the final.

== Discography ==
=== Albums ===
| Title | Year | Peak chart positions |
| Title | Year | SWE |
|---|---|---|
| Kind of Green | 2010 | — |
| Till mina älskade och älskare | 2012 | 21 |
| Du söker bråk, jag kräver dans | 2014 | 14 |
| Så mycket bättre 2018 – Tolkningarna | 2018 | 38 |
"—" denotes an album that did not chart or was not released.

=== EPs ===
| Title | Year | Peak chart positions |
| Title | Year | SWE |
|---|---|---|
| Till Från | 2019 | 3 |

=== Singles ===
| Title | Year | Peak chart positions |
| Title | Year | SWE |
|---|---|---|
| "Väldigt kär/Obegripligt ensam" | 2011 | — |
| "Alice" | 2012 | — |
| "Lyckligare nu" | 2012 | 3 |
| "Mitt rum i ditt hjärta" | 2012 | — |
| "Jag vet nåt som inte du vet (Mash Up International Remix)" | 2013 | — |
| "Du söker bråk, jag kräver dans" | 2013 | — |
| "Ensamheten (Vittorio Grasso Remix)" | 2014 | — |
| "Se på mig nu" (Petter featuring Linnea Henriksson) | 2016 | 5 |
| "Säga mig" | 2017 | 56 |
| "Släpper allt" (featuring Norlie & KKV) | 2017 | 80 |
| "Vadå" | 2017 | — (Note: "Vadå" did not enter the Sverigetopplistan singles chart, but peaked at number six on the Sverigetopplistan Heatseekers chart.) |
| "Hero" | 2018 | 100 |
| "Småtjejer" | 2018 | 29 |
| "Den stora dagen" | 2018 | 76 |
| "Fira jul med mig" | 2019 | 26 |
| "Jul, jul, strålande jul" | 2019 | 59 |
| "Betlehems stjärna" | 2019 | 94 |
| "Det kommer en tid" | 2020 | 90 |
| "En dålig idé" | 2021 | 96 |
| "Champagne" | 2022 | — (Note: "Champagne" did not enter the Swedish Singellista Chart, but peaked at number six on the Swedish Heatseeker Chart.) |
| "Den känslan" | 2025 | 32 |
| "Asfalt & nikotin" | 2025 | — (Note: "Asfalt & nikotin" did not enter the Swedish Singellista Chart, but peaked at number 19 on the Swedish Heatseeker Chart.) |
"—" denotes a single that did not chart or was not released.
