= Amir Benayoun =

Israeli singer-songwriter

Amir Benayoun עמיר בניון
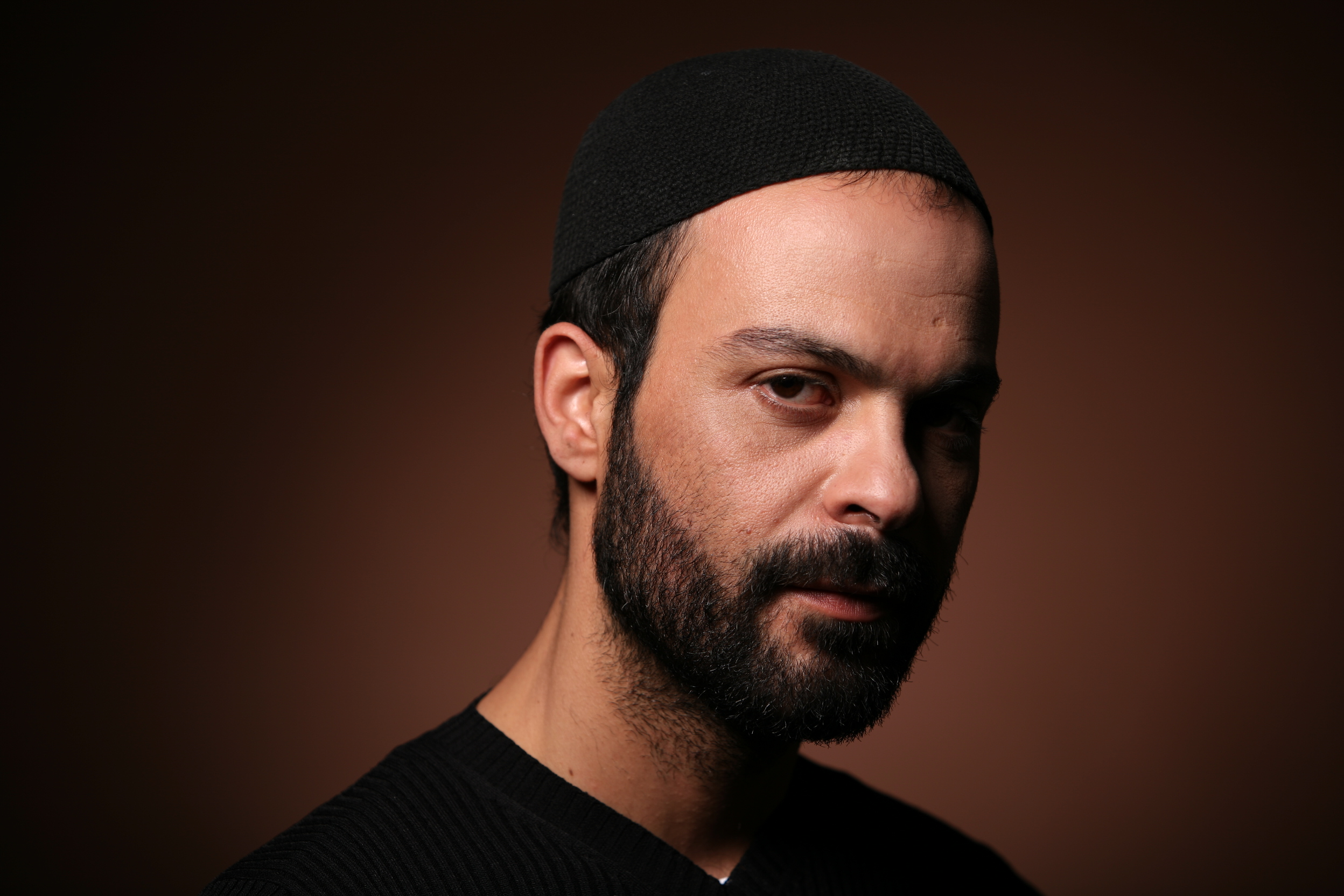
- Amir Benayoun

Background information
- Born: 30 August 1975 (age 51); Beersheba, Israel
- Origin: Israel
- Genres: Pop; Rock; Mizrahi music
- Occupation: Singer-songwriter
- Instruments: Vocals; Oud
- Years active: 1999–present
- Spouse: Miryam Golan (m. 2005; div. 2018)
- Children: 2
- Relatives: Yossi Benayoun (second cousin)

Amir Benayoun (Hebrew: עמיר בניון; born on August 30, 1975) is an Israeli singer-songwriter.

== Biography ==
Amir Benayoun was born in Beersheba to Maxim and Esther Benayoun who moved to Israel from Algeria. His father was an oud player. From a very young age he showed great interest in music, playing with his father and his brother. While devoting himself to songwriting, he made a living working in home repair jobs. He was turned away from serving in the IDF because of a drug problem.

Benayoun is a second cousin of Yossi Benayoun. In November 2005 he married Miryam Golan, an Israeli poet and musician. The couple have two children. They divorced in 2018.

Benayoun has said that, after performing on Shabbat once early in his career and regretting it, he did not do so again. He associates Shabbat with childhood visits to the synagogue, family customs and the singing of piyyutim.

== Music career ==
In 1999 Benayoun released his first album, "Rak Ath" (Only You), selling 40,000 copies. Shortly after it came the second album, and in 2002 his third, "Shalechet" (Fall), was a big hit, establishing Benayoun in the mainstream of Israeli music.

Additionally, he wrote and composed songs for other artists, such as Gidi Gov and Gali Atari and Yehoram Gaon.

In 2011, Benayoun created an album in Arabic called "Zini" to support the people in the Syrian uprising.

In 2012 he began to include in his Albums parts of his wife's poetry. The artistic collaboration between the two maintained until their divorce.

== Awards and recognition ==
In 2006, Benayoun won an ACUM prize for his song, "Nitzacht Iti Hakol" but he refused to accept it and donated it instead.

== Controversy ==
In November 2014, the President of Israel, Reuven Rivlin cancelled a scheduled performance by Benayoun at the president's official residence, after the latter released a song reacting to a deadly terror attack on a synagogue in Jerusalem on November 18. The lyric described a terrorist dreaming of murdering Jews, and a wave of controversy arose in reaction to its circulation. A poll by Channel 2 News suggested 42% of Israelis concur with the song's sentiments. Meretz MK Issawi Frej has requested that the singer be investigated on incitement charges. However, Benayoun was not investigated and President Reuven Rivlin was severely criticized for his decision, also by MP Uri Orbach who stated he will not attend the event at the president's official residence if Benayoun's performance will not take place as planned.

== Discography ==
=== Albums ===
- Rak At (רק את – Only You) 1999
- Oto Makom, Ota Haruach (אותו מקום אותה הרוח – The Same Place, the Same Spirit) 1999
- Shalechet (שלכת – Fall) 2002
- Nitzacht Iti Hakol (ניצחת איתי הכל – You Won Everything with Me) 2004
- Hakol Ad Lecan (הכל עד לכאן – Everything until Here) 2006
- Aluf Beshachor (אלוף בשחור – Champion in Black) 2007
- Omed Basha'ar (עומד בשער – Standing at the Gate) 2008
- Machshavot – with Yehuda Masas (מחשבות – Thoughts) 2010
- Lada'at Hakol (לדעת הכל – To Know Everything) 2010
- Etz Al Mayim (עץ על מים – Tree On Water) 2012
- Shirei Eretz Ahava (שירי ארץ אהבה – Songs of a Land of Love) 2013
- Sufa (סופה – Storm) 2015
- Milah Baruach (מילה ברוח – A Word in the Wind), 2016

=== Compilations ===
- Sha'a Shel Or (שעה של אור – Hour of Light) 2009

=== Mini albums ===
- Hamiklat (המקלט – The Shelter) 2011
- Zini 2011 (in Arabic)

== See also ==
- Music of Israel
