= Vilhelm Buchaus =

Swedish singer

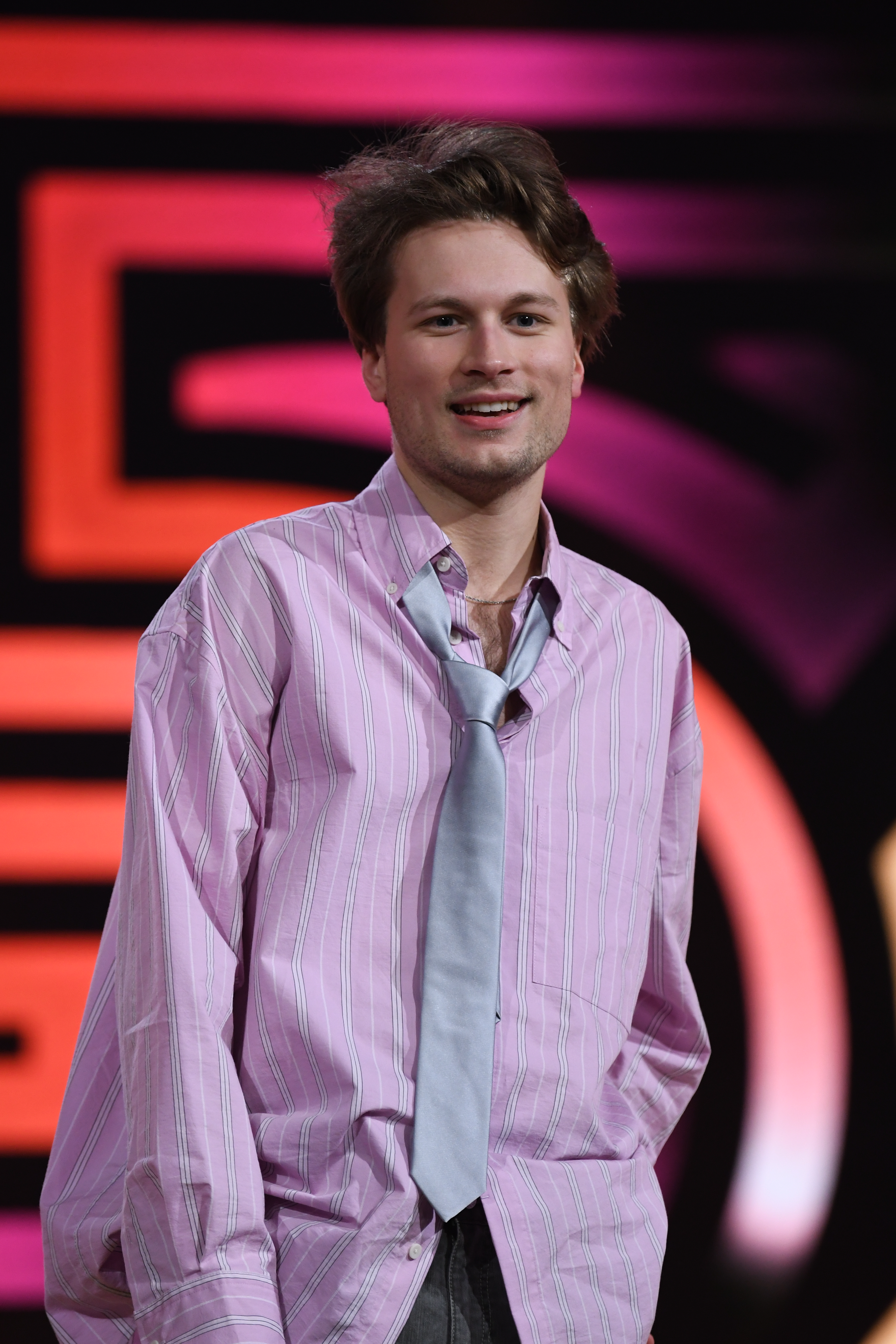
- Vilhelm Buchaus in 2025

Background information
- Born: 29 September 2001 (age 24)
- Origin: Sigtuna, Sweden

Vilhelm Fredric Buchaus (born 29 September 2001) is a Swedish songwriter and singer. He participated in Lilla Melodifestivalen 2013 with the song "För alltid och en dag", placing second. He then became a member of the boyband Skyscraper, they participated in Lilla Melodifestivalen 2014 with the song "Här är vi nu", again placing second. Buchaus, as a solo singer, participated in Melodifestivalen 2025, with the song "I'm Yours".

== Discography ==
=== Singles ===
Title	Year	Peak chart positions	Album
Title	Year	SWE	Album
"I'm Yours"	2025	15	Non-album singles
"Hearts Don't Lie"	2026	31	Non-album singles
