= Greczula =

Swedish singer (born 1992)

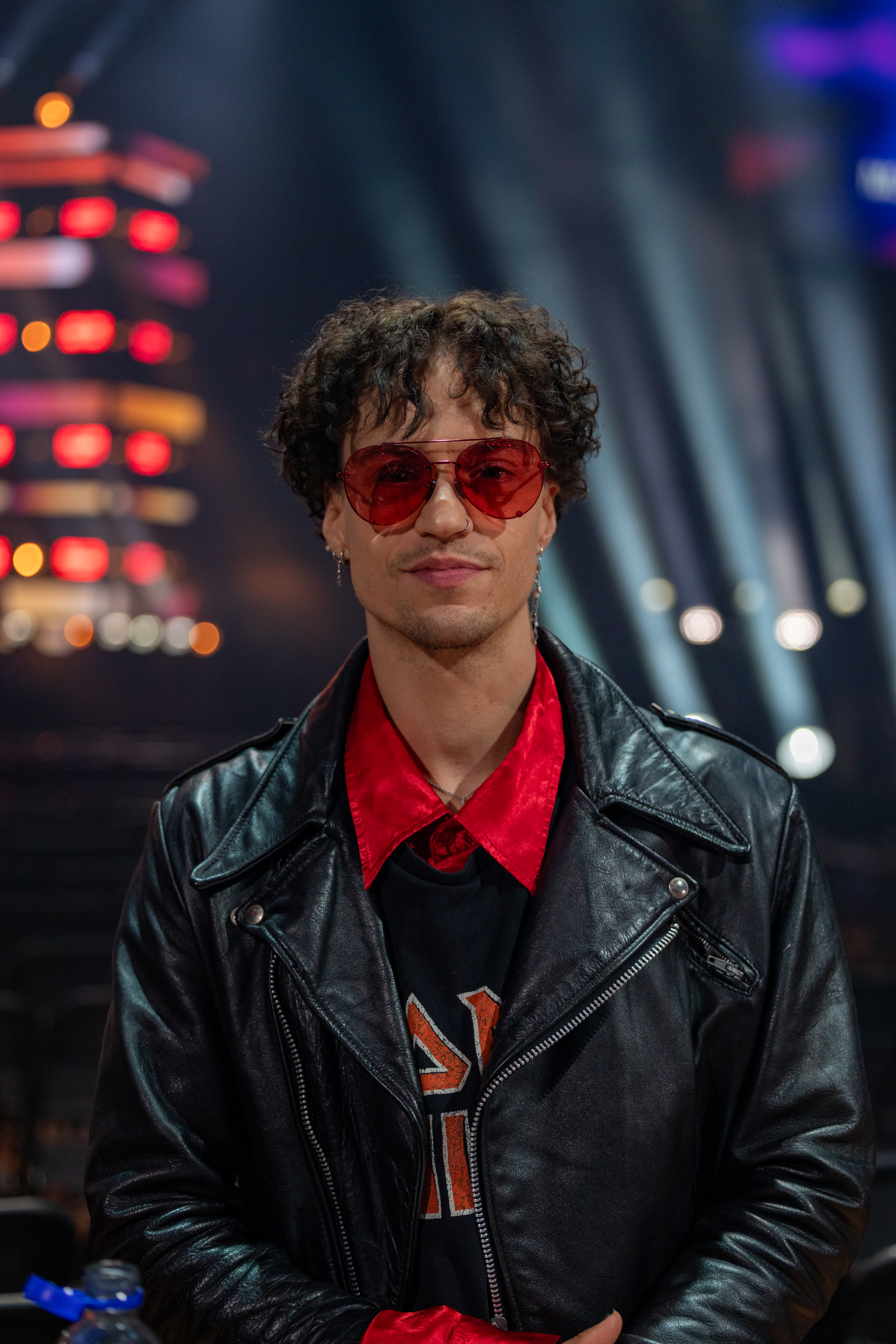

Background information
- Also known as: Kristofer Greczula
- Born: Kristofer Niklas Greczula; 27 February 1992 (age 34); Karlskrona Municipality, Sweden
- Genres: Pop, rock
- Occupation: Singer
- Years active: 2017–present
- Labels: Playground Music; Scandinavia AB Warner Music
- Partner: Keyyo (2025–2026)

Kristofer Niklas Greczula ([ˈɡreːsəla]; born 27 February 1992), known mononymously as Greczula, is a Swedish singer.

== Biography ==
Greczula was born in the Karlskrona Municipality, where his father was a table tennis player, and grew up in Falkenberg. His grandfather emigrated from Hungary. In his youth, Greczula also played table tennis. He trained with the youth national team and won three titles at Swedish youth championships. He eventually gave up training and founded the band Damn Delicious with school friends. The band eventually disbanded and Greczula was subsequently part of the rock band The Felix until 2015.

In 2017, Greczula started releasing his own music under the name Kristofer Greczula. His debut solo album Live and Let Live was released in 2022. Later that year, he participated in the 2022 Allsång på Skansen. In 2024, he switched to the stage name Greczula. On 26 November 2024, it was announced that Greczula would participate in Melodifestivalen 2025 with the song "Believe Me". He performed on 15 February 2025 in the third heat and finished first, qualifying directly to the 8 March 2025 final, where he placed third. He participated in Melodifestivalen 2026 with the song "Half Of Me", and performed in the first heat on 31 January 2026. Greczula went on to win the heat, becoming the first out of 12 to qualify for the 7 March 2026 final in Strawberry Arena in Solna, Stockholm. He placed second in the final.

== Discography ==
=== Albums ===
- 2022 – Live and Let Live (Playground Music Scandinavia AB).
- 2025 – Greczula (Warner Music Sweden AB).

=== Singles ===
- 2017 – You're Not Alone (Rehn Music Group).
- 2021 – Leaving You for Another (Playground Music Scandinavia AB).
- 2021 – Change It (Playground Music Scandinavia AB), with David Bay.
- 2021 – Change It - David Bay Remix (Playground Music Scandinavia AB), with David Bay.
- 2021 – Hold My Heart (Playground Music Scandinavia AB).
- 2022 – Something Outta Nothing (Blah Blah Blah) (Playground Music Scandinavia AB).
- 2022 – Hold Out (Playground Music Scandinavia AB).
- 2022 – Stronger (Playground Music Scandinavia AB).
- 2023 – Stronger - Stripped version (Playground Music Scandinavia AB).
- 2025 – Believe Me (Warner Music Sweden AB).
- 2025 – Higher Place (Warner Music Sweden AB).
- 2025 – På egna ben (Warner Music Sweden AB), with Carola.
- 2026 – Half of Me (Warner Music Sweden AB).
- 2026 - My Forever Song (Warner Music Sweden AB)
- 2026 - Love = Art (Warner Music Sweden AB)

=== Charting singles ===
Title	Year	Peak chart positions	Album
Title	Year	SWE	Album
"Believe Me"	2025	5	Greczula
"Higher Place"	2025	—	Greczula
"På egna ben" (featuring Carola)	2025	77	Non-album singles
"Half of Me"	2026	6	Non-album singles
