= Talang (Swedish TV series) =

Swedish version of the Got Talent series show

- Genre: Reality talent show
- Created by: Simon Cowell
- Presented by: Peppe Eng (2007–2008); Kodjo Akolor (2008); Tobbe Blom (2009–2011); Markoolio (2009–2011); Adam Alsing (2014); Malin Gramer (2014); Kristina Petrushina (2017–2018); Pär Lernström (2017–2023); Samir Badran (2019–2021)
- Country of origin: Sweden
- Original language: Swedish
- No. of seasons: 12
- No. of episodes: 51 (including 2007–2011)

Production
- Production company: FremantleMedia

Original release
- Network: TV4 (2007–2011, 2017–2023 2026-); TV3 (2014)
- Release: 2007

Talang, formerly named Talang Sverige (pronounced [taˈlaŋː ˈsvæ̌rjɛ]; lit. 'Talent Sweden') in 2014, is the Swedish version of the Got Talent series show where singers, dancers, comedians, variety acts and other performers compete against each other for audience support and the prize money (1 million SEK in 2007 and 2014; 500,000 SEK between 2008 and 2011 and since 2017).

== History ==
The show was broadcast for five seasons on TV4, between 2007 and 2011, before TV4 put the show on indefinite hiatus. Two years later, on 19 June 2013, TV3 announced that they had acquired the rights for the show and would re-launch the show in spring 2014 under the name Talang Sverige. After another 2 years without a season, in 2017, TV4 acquired the rights for the show once again and re-launched the show under the original name, Talang. On 1 September 2023, TV4 announced that the series will be paused during 2024.

== Hosts and judges ==
Series	Host		Judges (sitting order)			
Series	Host		1	2	3	4
1	Peppe Eng	—N/a	Tobbe Blom	Hanna Hedlund	Bert Karlsson	—N/a
2	Peppe Eng	Kodjo Akolor	Tobbe Blom	Sofia Wistam	Bert Karlsson	—N/a
3	Tobbe Blom	Markoolio	Johan Pråmell	Charlotte Perrelli	Bert Karlsson	—N/a
4	Tobbe Blom	Markoolio	Johan Pråmell	Charlotte Perrelli	Bert Karlsson	—N/a
5	Tobbe Blom	Markoolio	Henrik Fexeus	Charlotte Perrelli	Bert Karlsson	—N/a
6	Adam Alsing	Malin Gramer	Tobias Karlsson	Carolina Gynning	Shirley Clamp	Robert Aschberg
7	Pär Lernström	Keyyo	David Batra	Kakan Hermansson	LaGaylia Frazier	Alexander Bard
8	Pär Lernström	Keyyo	David Batra	Bianca Ingrosso	LaGaylia Frazier	Alexander Bard
9	Pär Lernström	Samir Badran	David Batra	Bianca Ingrosso	LaGaylia Frazier	Alexander Bard
10	Pär Lernström	Samir Badran	David Batra	Bianca Ingrosso	LaGaylia Frazier	Alexander Bard
11	Pär Lernström	Samir Badran	David Batra	Bianca Ingrosso	Edward af Sillén	Sarah Dawn Finer
12	Pär Lernström	—N/a	David Batra	Bianca Ingrosso	Edward af Sillén	Sarah Dawn Finer
13	Pär Lernström	—N/a	David Batra	Helena Bergström	Johanna Nordström	Viktor Norén
14	Pär Lernström	Tord (puppet)	Michael Lindgren	Molly Hammar	David Batra	Keyyo

== Season summary ==
Season	Airdate	Winner	Runners-up	Judges				Presenters	
Season	Airdate	Winner	Runners-up	1	2	3	4	Presenters	
1 (2007)	13 April 2007 – 1 June 2007	Zillah & Totte (Ventriloquist)	Magikern Julien (Magician)	Tobbe Blom	Hanna Hedlund	Bert Karlsson	—N/a	Peppe Eng	—N/a
2 (2008)	4 April 2008 – 30 May 2008	Zara Larsson (Singer)	Not revealed	Tobbe Blom	Sofia Wistam	Bert Karlsson	—N/a	Peppe Eng	Kodjo Akolor
3 (2009)	3 April 2009 – 12 June 2009	Charlie Caper (Magician)	David Movsesian (Pianist)	Johan Pråmell	Charlotte Perrelli	Bert Karlsson	—N/a	Tobbe Blom	Markoolio
4 (2010)	2 April 2010 – 4 June 2010	Jill Svensson (Opera singer)	Daniel Lozakovitj (Violinist)	Johan Pråmell	Charlotte Perrelli	Bert Karlsson	—N/a	Tobbe Blom	Markoolio
5 (2011)	1 April 2011 – 10 June 2011	Simon Westlund (Rubik's Cube solver)	Steve Thoresen (Opera singer)	Henrik Fexeus	Charlotte Perrelli	Bert Karlsson	—N/a	Tobbe Blom	Markoolio
6 (2014)	24 February 2014 – 18 May 2014	Jon Henrik Fjällgren (Singer)	Rackartygarna (Extreme sports group); Until The End Crew (Dance group)	Tobias Karlsson	Carolina Gynning	Shirley Clamp	Robert Aschberg	Adam Alsing	Malin Gramer
7 (2017)	18 March 2017 – 19 May 2017	Ibrahim Nasrullayeu (Singer)	Nigma (Rapper / singer); Oliver Rytting (Rock singer)	David Batra, LaGaylia Frazier, Kakan Hermansson, Alexander Bard	Pär Lernström, Kristina "Keyyo" Petrushina				
8 (2018)	13 January 2018 – 16 March 2018	Madeleine Hilleard (Opera Singer)	Jonas von Essen (Mnemonist); Osman (Rapper)	David Batra, LaGaylia Frazier, Bianca Ingrosso, Alexander Bard	Pär Lernström, Kristina "Keyyo" Petrushina				
9 (2019)	11 January 2019 – 15 March 2019	Micke Holm (Singer)	Marwin Wallonius (Mnemonist); Eva Jumatate (Singer)	David Batra, LaGaylia Frazier, Bianca Ingrosso, Alexander Bard	Pär Lernström, Samir Badran				
10 (2020)	10 January 2020 – 13 March 2020	Lizette Olausson and Lotus (Dog Freestyle)	Maja Jakobsson (Singer); Alexander (Mnemonist)	David Batra, LaGaylia Frazier, Bianca Ingrosso, Alexander Bard	Pär Lernström, Samir Badran				
11 (2021)	15 January 2021 – 19 March 2021	Johan Ståhl (Magician)	Kiana Blanckert (Singer); EEC (Dance Group)	David Batra, Bianca Ingrosso, Sarah Dawn Finer, Edward af Sillen	Pär Lernström, Samir Badran				
12 (2022)	14 January 2022 – 18 March 2022	Aron Aras-Ericksson (Singer)	Peter Åberg (Magician); Stefan Lindström (Violinist)	David Batra, Bianca Ingrosso, Sarah Dawn Finer, Edward af Sillen	Pär Lernström				
13 (2023)	13 January 2023 – 17 March 2023	Pontus Lindman (Magician)	Samet Yüce (Maths genius); Jennifer Aoun (Singer)	David Batra, Helena Bergström, Johanna Nordström, Viktor Norén	Pär Lernström				
