= Idol 2025 (Sweden) =

- Season 2025
- Hosted by: Pär Lernström; Behrouz Badreh; Oscar Zia; Johanna Nordström; Edvin Törnblom
- Judges: Anders Bagge; Katia Mosally; Peg Parnevik; Ash Pournouri
- Winner: Tuva Råwall
- Runner-up: Love Stenmarck
- Finals venue: Fildelfia Convention Center, Stockholm

Release
- Original network: TV4
- Original release: 23 August – 6 December 2025

Season chronology
- ← Previous; Season 2024 Next → Season 2026

Idol 2025 is the twenty-first season of the Swedish Idol series. The season premiered on 23 August 2025 on TV4. All four judges from the previous season returned this season. Pär Lernström returns as host for his fourteenth consecutive season. He has also been joined by Behrouz Badreh, Oscar Zia, Johanna Nordström and Edvin Törnblom as his co-hosts for this season.

Winner of this season was singer Tuva Råwall.

== Elimination chart ==
Stadium:		Weekly finals							Final
Dates:		18/10	25/10	1/11	8/11	15/11	22/11	29/11	6/12
Place	Contestants	Results							
1
1	Tuva Råwall		6:th						Winner
2	Love Stenmarck								Runner-up
3	Nicolina-Mercedes Brandström	5:th		9:th	7:th	6:th	5:th		3rd Place
4	Ingrid Enckell							Eliminated	
5	Jonas Elfqvist							Eliminated	
6	Arvid Lorentsson					5:th	Eliminated		
7	Love Backlund			10:th	8:th	Eliminated			
8	Sofia Gregersen		5:th			Eliminated			
9	Jénovic Luyindula				Eliminated				
10	Karl Noremo				Eliminated				
11	Rebecca Larsson			Eliminated					
12	Malva Turestedt Cederholm	6:th		Eliminated					
13	Nora Lundmark		Eliminated						
14	Allan Ismail		Eliminated						
15	Alma Adolfsson	Eliminated							
16	Rasmus Bergman	Eliminated							

Legend
Women	Men	Safe	Bottom 4	Eliminated	Stage not reached
