= Talang 2019 =

- Season 2019
- Hosted by: Pär Lernström; Samir Badran
- Judges: Alexander Bard; Bianca Ingrosso; LaGaylia Frazier; David Batra
- Winner: Micke Holm
- Runners-up: Eva Jumatate; Marwin Wallonius

Release
- Original network: TV4
- Original release: 11 January – 15 March 2019

Season chronology
- ← Previous; Talang 2018 Next → Talang 2020

Talang 2019 was the ninth season of Swedish Talang and was broadcast on TV4 between 11 January 2019 and 15 March 2019. Presenters for this season are Pär Lernström along with Samir Badran, the jury consists of Alexander Bard, David Batra, Bianca Ingrosso and LaGaylia Frazier. Winner of this season what singer Micke Holm.

== Semifinals ==
- Winner
- Runner's-up
- Finalist
- Semi-finalist (lost judges' vote)
- Semi-finalist (eliminated)
- Golden Buzzer

Name of act	Act	Semifinal Week	Result
Micke Holm	Singer	N/A	Winner
Eva Jumatate	Singer	N/A	Runner's-Up
Marwin Wallonius	Mentalist	N/A	Runner's-Up
Dan Athola	Hypnotist	N/A	Finalist
Saga	Singer	1	Finalist
Vilgot	Magician	1	Finalist
David Tengblad	Dancer	2	Finalist
Slava	Acrobat	2	Finalist
Marcus Leu	Jazz Singer	1	Lost Judges Vote
Cirkus Unik	Acrobatic Duo	2	Lost Judges Vote
Marta Marang	Singer	1	Eliminated
Antton Puonti	Hand Squeezer	1	Eliminated
Lisa & Kummin	Dog Act	1	Eliminated
Antony Berisha	Singer	1	Eliminated
Kurbits Crew	Dance Group	1	Eliminated
Rezdar Bakri	Dancer	2	Eliminated
Manda	Singer	2	Eliminated
Syskonen Kunda	Vocal Group	2	Eliminated
Michael Mendoza	Illusionist	2	Eliminated
Obsession Crew	Dance Group	2	Eliminated

=== Semi-final 1 (1 March 2019) ===
Order	Artist	Act	Buzzes And Judges Vote				Finished
Order	Artist	Act	David	Lagaylia	Bianca	Alexander	Finished
1	Marta Marang	Singer					Eliminated
2	Vilgot	Magician					Won Judges Vote
3	Antton Puonti	Hand Squeezer					Eliminated
4	Lisa & Kummin	Dog Act					Eliminated
5	Saga	Singer					Won Public Vote
6	Antony Berisha	Singer					Eliminated
7	Kurbits Crew	Dance Group					Eliminated
8	Marcus Leu	Jazz Singer					Lost Judges Vote

=== Semi-final 2 (8 March 2019) ===
Order	Artist	Act	Buzzes And Judges Vote				Finished
Order	Artist	Act	David	Lagaylia	Bianca	Alexander	Finished
1	Rezdar Bakri	Dancer					Eliminated
2	Cirkus Unik	Acrobatic Duo					Lost Judges Vote
3	Manda	Singer					Eliminated
4	David Tengblad	Dancer					Won Public Vote
5	Slava	Acrobat					Won Judges Vote
6	Syskonen Kunda	Vocal Group					Eliminated
7	Michael Mendoza	Illusionist					Eliminated
8	Obsession Crew	Dance Group					Eliminated

=== Grand Final (15 March 2019) ===
Order	Artist	Act	Buzzes				Finished
Order	Artist	Act	David	Lagaylia	Bianca	Alexander	Finished
1	David Tengblad	Dancer					Bottom 5
2	Dan Athola	Hypnotist					Bottom 5
3	Saga	Singer					Bottom 5
4	Slava	Acrobat					Bottom 5
5	Eva Jumatate	Singer					Runner's-Up
6	Vilgot	Magician					Bottom 5
7	Marwin Wallonius	Mentalist					Runner's-Up
8	Micke Holm	Singer					Winner
