= Amie Bramme Sey =

Swedish television and radio presenter

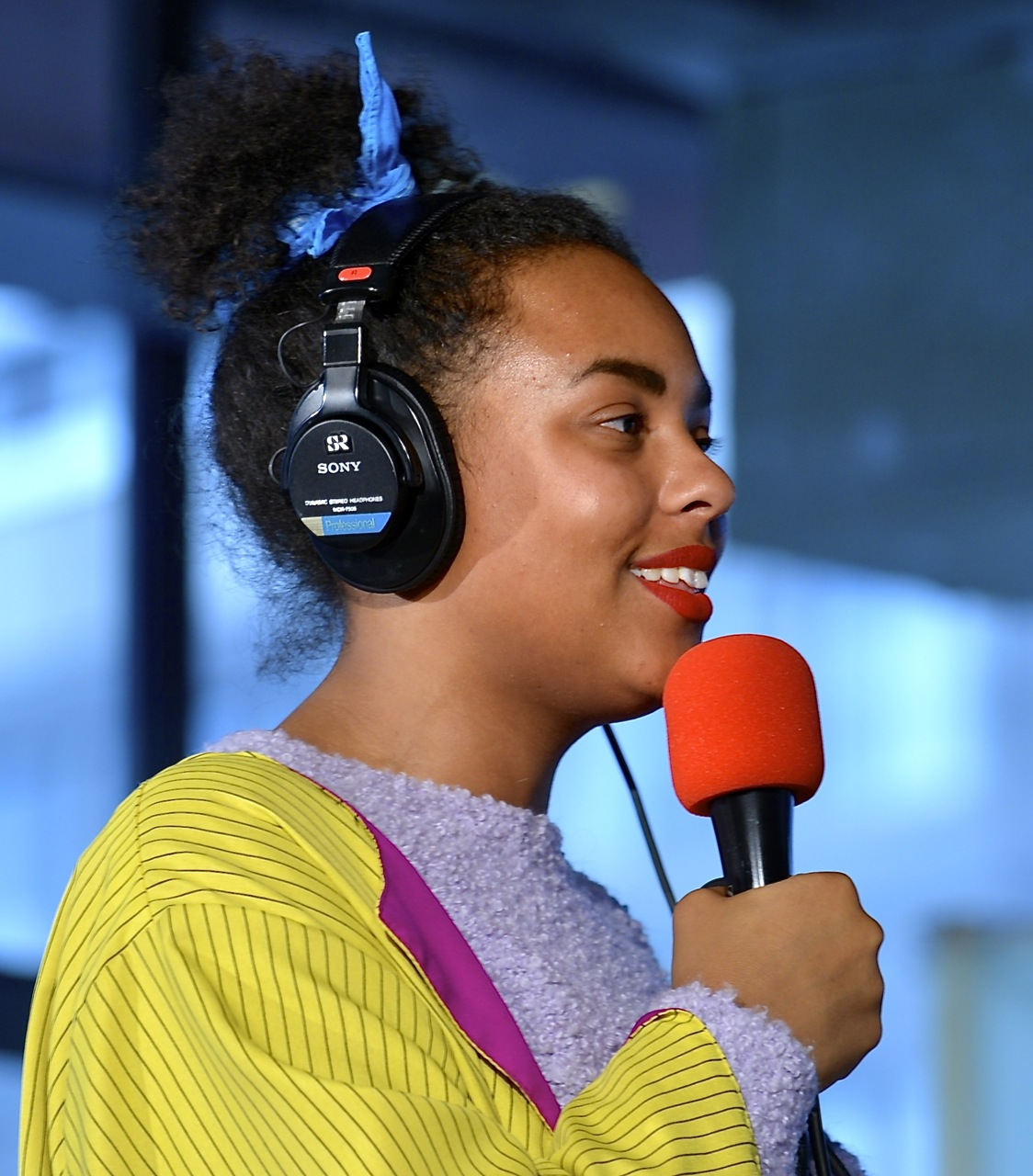
- Born: Ami-Miriam Bramme Sey; 12 August 1987 (age 39); Stockholm, Sweden
- Occupations: Television and radio presenter
- Children: 1

Ami-Miriam "Amie" Bramme Sey (born 12 August 1987) is a Swedish television and radio presenter. She has hosted the film awards Guldbaggegalan and the music awards Grammisgalan, participated as a contestant in ”På spåret” and ”Förrädarna.” As well as presenting the dating shows ”Bachelor” and ”Idol 2023.” As well as a career on radio and podcast.

== Biography ==
Bramme Sey grew up in Södermalm, Stockholm, with her sister Fatima Bramme Sey. Her half-sister is singer Seinabo Sey. Her father, Gambian-Swedish musician Maudo Sey, they never met, and Bramme Sey saw her father for the first time after his death in 2013. He had suffered a stroke in Gambia and had been transported to a Swedish hospital for treatment, Amie Bramme Sey told about this while presenting her episode of the radio show Sommar i P1 in 2021.

She started her career in radio in Metropol, as the presenter of her own show, Metropol med Amie, and she was later employed by Sveriges Radio as a culture reporter ahead of the 2014 General Election in Sweden.

In the 2017–18 season of the game show På spåret broadcast on SVT, she participated along with Gunnar Bolin, placing second. In 2021, along with David Sundin she hosted the movie awards Guldbaggegalan.

In 2023, she presented the reality dating show Bachelor, which was broadcast on Sjuan.

Amie Bramme Sey hosted the annual music award Grammisgalan three times in a row. First in 2021 along with Johanna Nordström, in 2022 with Sofia Dalén, and in 2023 along with Pelle Almqvist.

During Idol 2023 she was a co-presenter of the show along with Pär Lernström. The show was broadcast on TV4.

Ahead of Idol 2024 Bramme Sey was replaced by Mauri Hermundsson as co-presenter. In December 2024, she was a ”travelling reporter” for Musikhjälpen, travelling to Sierra Leone to report about what can be done to help people there. Amie Bramme Sey and her cousin have the podcast ”Raseriet” together. In the podcast the duo talks about human rights and equality.

In 2025, Amie Bramme Sey takes part as a contestant in the third season of ”Förrädarna,” the Swedish version of The Traitors, which is broadcast on TV4.

Amie Bramme Sey has one child, a daughter born in 2017. She and the child's father parted ways in 2022. Since 2023, she is in a relationship with Paradise Hotel contestant Oliver Strige.
