= Talang 2021 =

- Season 2021
- Hosted by: Pär Lernström; Samir Badran
- Judges: David Batra; Bianca Ingrosso; Edward af Sillen; Sarah Dawn Finer

Release
- Original network: TV4
- Original release: 15 January – 19 March 2021

Season chronology
- ← Previous; Talang 2020 Next → Talang 2022

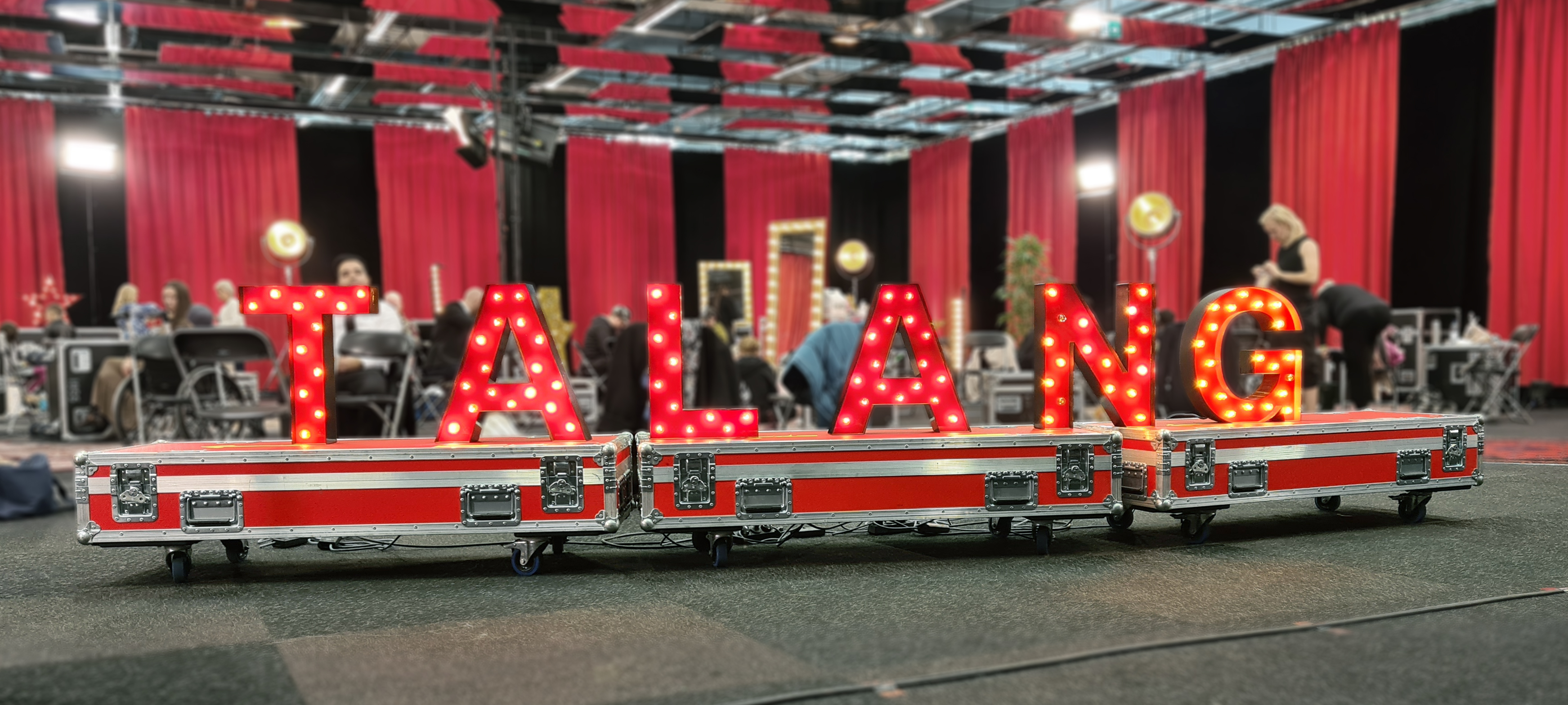
waiting area at Talang 2021venue

Talang 2021 was the eleventh season of Talang and was broadcast on TV4 15 January – 19 March 2021. Presenters for this season were Pär Lernström and Samir Badran, and the jury consisted of Sarah Dawn Finer, David Batra, Bianca Ingrosso and Edward af Sillen. The jury members Alexander Bard and LaGaylia Frazier left the show after season ten and were replaced by Sillen and Dawn Finer.

Magician Johan Ståhl won the final 19 March.

== Episodes ==
Episode	Airdate	Golden Buzzer	Golden Buzzer pressed by	Performance
1	15 January 2021	Johan Ståhl	Bianca Ingrosso	Magic
2	22 January 2021	Gift Blessing	Sarah Dawn Finer	Rap
3	29 January 2021			
4	5 February 2021	Martin Nilsson	David Batra	Memory master
5	12 February 2021			
6	19 February 2021	Elwin Heikkinen	Edward af Sillén	Song
7	26 February 2021			
8	5 March 2021	Semifinal 1		
9	12 March 2021	Semifinal 2		
10	19 March 2021	Final		
