= Talang Sverige 2014 =

Season of television series

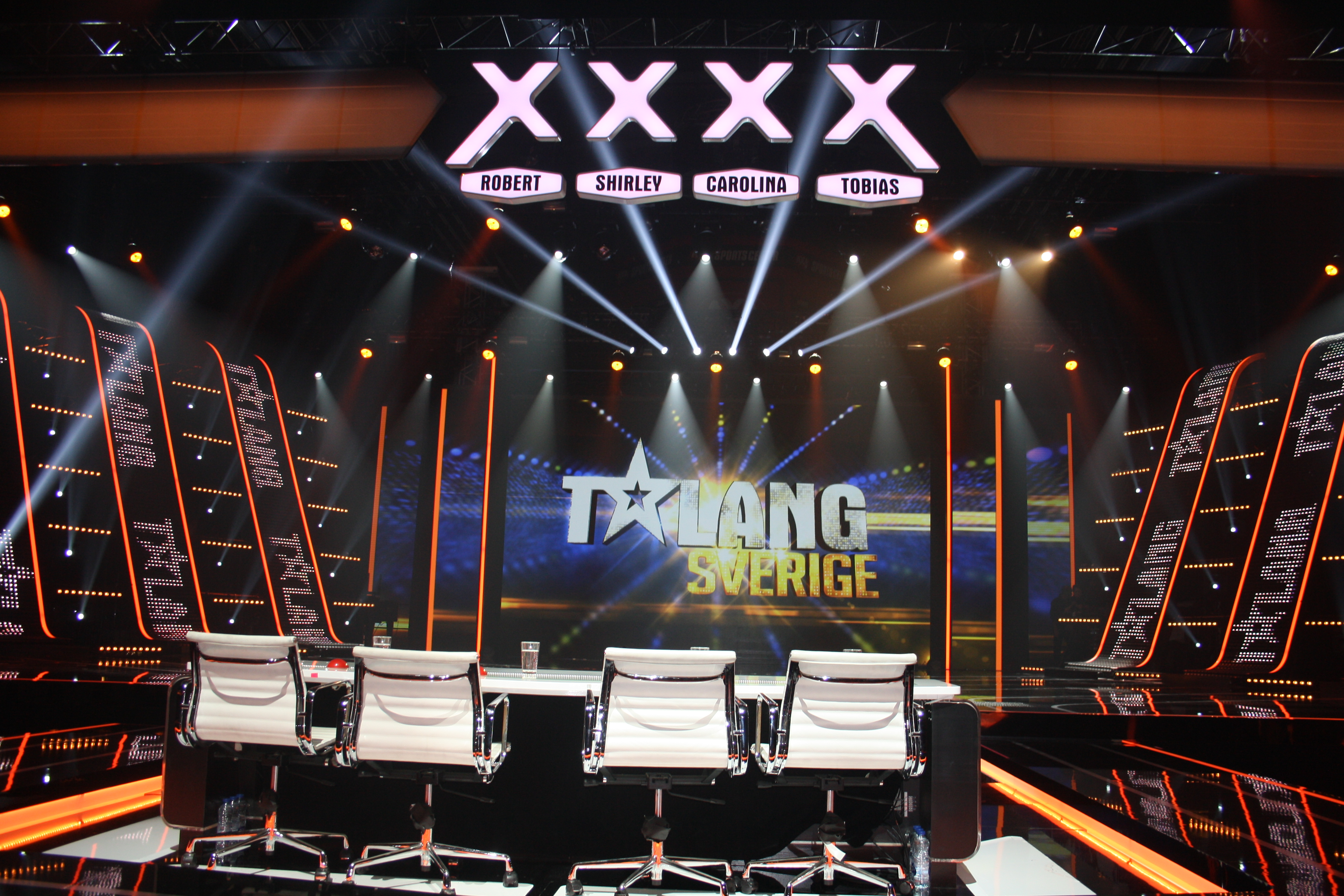
- The studio for Talang Sverige 2014
- Genre: Talent show
- Presented by: Adam Alsing & Malin Gramer
- Judges: Tobias Karlsson; Carolina Gynning; Shirley Clamp; Robert Aschberg; Tobbe Blom (guest)
- Country of origin: Sweden
- Original language: Swedish

Production
- Production company: FremantleMedia

Original release
- Network: TV3
- Release: February 24 – May 18, 2014

Related
- Talang 2011; Talang 2017

Talang Sverige 2014 was the sixth season of Talang Sverige (previously named Talang), the Swedish version of Got Talent, as well as the show's first season under the name "Talang Sverige". It was broadcast between February 24, 2014, and May 18, 2014. It was the first season aired on TV3. June 19, 2013, following a two-year hiatus, TV3 announced that they had acquired the rights for the show and would broadcast the show in 2014. The show took place in larger arenas than previous seasons, allowing things like motor vehicles and bigger animals on the stage. Joik singer Jon Henrik Fjällgren was declared winner and walked away with 1 million SEK.

== Tour ==
The audition tour was held in November 2013.

- November 6–7 – Ericsson Globe, Stockholm
- November 14–15 – Läkerol Arena, Gävle
- November 21–22 – Stadium Arena, Norrköping
- November 26–27 – Helsingborg Arena, Helsingborg

=== Semi-finalists ===
Key	Winner	Runner-up	Finalist	Wildcard

Name of act	Act	Semi-final	Result
Jon Henrik Fjällgren	Joik singer	1	Winner
Rackartygarna	Motorbike Stunt Group	1	Runner's Up
Until The End Crew	Dance Group	3	Runner's Up
Gaston	Balancing/Magician/Juggler	3	Wild Card
Twisted Family	Dance Group	2	Advanced
Cupcake Crew	Dance Group	1	Advanced
Anik/Coco Pops	Dancers	2	Advanced
Josefin Nilsson	Singer	2	Advanced
Glen Edell	Singer	3	Advanced
Jacob Frohde	Singer	3	Advanced
Calle & Moe	Singers And Dancers	1	Eliminated
Frida Och Itchi	Dog Act	1	Eliminated
Johanna Eriksson	Singer	1	Eliminated
Grounded	Dance Group	1	Eliminated
Raul Mendoza	Hand Juggling	1	Eliminated
Hannes Rudenstam	Piano	1	Eliminated
Adrian Videla	Illusionist	1	Eliminated
Oscar & Ibrahim	Dancers	1	Eliminated
Dotse	Dancer	1	Eliminated
Power Cheer Eagles	Cheer Leading Dance	2	Eliminated
Jonas Von Essen	Memory	2	Eliminated
Hanna Ferm	Singer	2	Eliminated
Magicians With Balls	Magicians	2	Eliminated
Hanna & Sebastian	Acrobats	2	Eliminated
Gunnar Holma	Singer	2	Eliminated
Peter Varg	Quick-Change	2	Eliminated
Johan Stjernquist	Singer	2	Eliminated
Draco Spiritus	Dangerous Act	2	Eliminated
Nunchucks	Dance Group	3	Eliminated
Rebecka Karlsson	Singer	3	Eliminated
Unitwins	Unicycle Trick Act	3	Eliminated
Max and Hanna	Acrobat Performers	3	Eliminated
Nicole & Kryspin	Singer/Guitarist/Violinist	3	Eliminated
Ellen & Linn	Dancers	3	Eliminated
lavin	Band	3	Eliminated
Lazy Joe	Motorbike Skill Act	3	Eliminated

=== Semi-finals ===
==== Semi-final 1 ====
Artist	Act	Order	Buzzes				Finished
Artist	Act	Order	Robert Aschberg	Clamp	Gynning	Karlsson	Finished
Calle & Moe	Singers And Dancers	1					Eliminated
Frida Och Itchi	Dog Act	2					Eliminated
Rackartygarna	Motorbike Stunt Group	3					Advanced
Johanna Eriksson	Singer	4					Eliminated
Grounded	Dance Group	5					Eliminated
Raul Mendoza	hand juggling	6					Eliminated
Jon Henrik Fjällgren	Joik singer	7					Advanced
Hannes Rudenstam	Piano	8					Eliminated
Cupcake Crew	Dance Group	9					Advanced
Adrian Videla	Illusionist	10					Eliminated
Oscar & Ibrahim	Dancers	11					Eliminated
Dotse	Dancer	12					Eliminated

==== Semi-final 2 ====
Artist	Act	Order	Buzzes				Finished
Artist	Act	Order	Aschburg	Clamp	Gynning	Karlsson	Finished
Power Cheer Eagles	Cheer Leading Dancers	1					Eliminated
Jonas Von Essen	Memory	2					Eliminated
Hanna Ferm	Singer	3					Eliminated
Magicians With Balls	Magicians	4					Eliminated
Hanna & Sebastian	Acrobatics	5					Eliminated
Gunnar Holma	Singer	6					Eliminated
Twisted Family	Dance Group	7					Advanced
Peter Varg	Quick-Change	8					Eliminated
Johan Stjernquist	Singer	9					Eliminated
Anik/Coco Pops	Dancer	10					Advanced
Josefin Nilsson	Singer	11					Advanced
Draco Spiritus	Dangerous Act	12					Eliminated

==== Semi-final 3 ====
Artist	Act	Order	Buzzes				Finished
Artist	Act	Order	Aschburg	Clamp	Blom	Karlsson	Finished
Nunchucks	Dance Group	1					Eliminated
Rebecka Karlsson	Singer	2					Eliminated
Unitwins	Unicycle Trick Act	3					Eliminated
Max and Hanna	Acrobatic Performers	4					Eliminated
Nicole & Kryspin	Singer/Guitarist/Violinist	5					Eliminated
Ellen & Linn	Dancers	6					Eliminated
Jacob Frohde	Singer	7					Advanced
Gaston	Balancing/alternative juggling	8					Wild Card
lavin	Band	9					Eliminated
Lazy Joe	Motorbike Skill Act	10					Eliminated
Until The End Crew	Dance Group	11					Advanced
Glen Edell	Singer	12					Advanced

- ^1 First Live Show Featured No Buzzers
- ^2 Tobbe Blom Replaced Carolina Gynning For This Semi-final
- ^3 Gaston Got The Wildcard

== Final ==
Artist	Order	Act	Finished
Cupcake Crew	1	Dance Group	Eliminated
Jacob Frohde	2	Singer	Eliminated
Gaston	3	Balancing/alternative	Eliminated
Anik/Coco pops	4	Dancer	Eliminated
Josefin Nilsson	5	Singer	Eliminated
Jon Henrik Fjällgren	6	Joik singer	Winner
Until The End Crew	7	Dance Group	Runner Up
Rackartygarna	8	Motorbike Dance Group	Runner Up
Glen Edell	9	Singer	Eliminated
Twisted Family	10	Dance Group	Eliminated
