= Mauri Hermundsson =

Swedish television presenter

Mauri Victor Leonardo Hermundsson (born Victor Leonardo Hermundsson, 30 October 1995) is a Swedish television presenter. Hermundsson started his career with his YouTube channel "Uppdrag: Mat"; the channel has a focus on food, although Mauri also meets people with special abilities or life stories. Mauri Hermundsson presented Lego Masters Sverige which was broadcast on TV4. In 2024, he participated in Bäst i test on TV4. Mauri will be the sidekick to Pär Lernström in Idol 2024. He has collaborated with multiple other YouTubers such as Joakim Lundell, Emil Hansius and Bianca Ingrosso, as well as the Swedish prime ministers Magdalena Andersson and Ulf Kristersson.

== Biography ==
=== Early life ===
Mauri Hermundsson grew up in Järna outside of Södertälje. His father is from Iceland and his mother is from Germany. At the age of seven he added Mauri as his first name.

=== Career ===
Hermundsson worked as a journalist for Expressen and Aftonbladet. In 2018, he launched the Youtube channel "Uppdrag mat" (Mission: food). He runs the channel along with photographer Esaja Ekman, and specializes in food. In every episode one or more guests appears. "Uppdrag mat started in co-operation with Aftonbladet and in 2021 had about 90 million views.

In 2019, Hermundsson was nominated for the "Stora journalistpriset" an award for journalism in the category "Innovator of the Year".

Mauri Hermundsson in 2021 placed eight in the Medieakademins Maktbarometer where they listed the most influential and popular media personalities. And his Youtube channel "Uppdrag mat" was the fourth biggest channel in Sweden. In 2022, his channel placed fifth.

In 2020, Mauri Hermundsson became the presenter of the TV4 show Lego Masters Sverige on TV4. Also in 2022, his show Mauri – vad hände sen? (Mauri – What happened next?) was broadcast on TV4. Lego Masters became nominated for a Kristallen television award. Mauri Hermundsson then went on to present the Aftonbladet TV comedy show "Noll kontroll". In 2024, Hermundsson was a panel member on Bäst i test. The same year he was a "sidekick" på Pär Lernström in Idol 2024 which also aired on TV4. He replaced the previous years "sidekick" Amie Bramme Sey.

Mauri Hermundsson has collaborated with multiple other YouTubers such as Joakim Lundell, Emil Hansius Throughout several project Hermundsson has worked with Bianca Ingrosso, as well as the Swedish prime ministers Magdalena Andersson and Ulf Kristersson. On 29 April 2025, Mauri Hermundsson appeared in a new travelling show on TV4 called Mauri och Morberg, where Mauri and Per Morberg will travel and experience places together. They also meets different Swedish celebrities like singer Carola Häggkvist, actor Mikael Persbrandt and ambassador to South Africa, Håkan Juholt. Mauri Hermundsson has also in 2025 released his own chips called "Red Head", with several different chips flavours.

In April 2025, the wild life park Kolmården named a baby giraffe "Mauri" after Mauri Hermundsson, with Hermundsson telling Sveriges Radio that he was very happy with the park's decision.
