= Talang 2023 =

- Season 2023
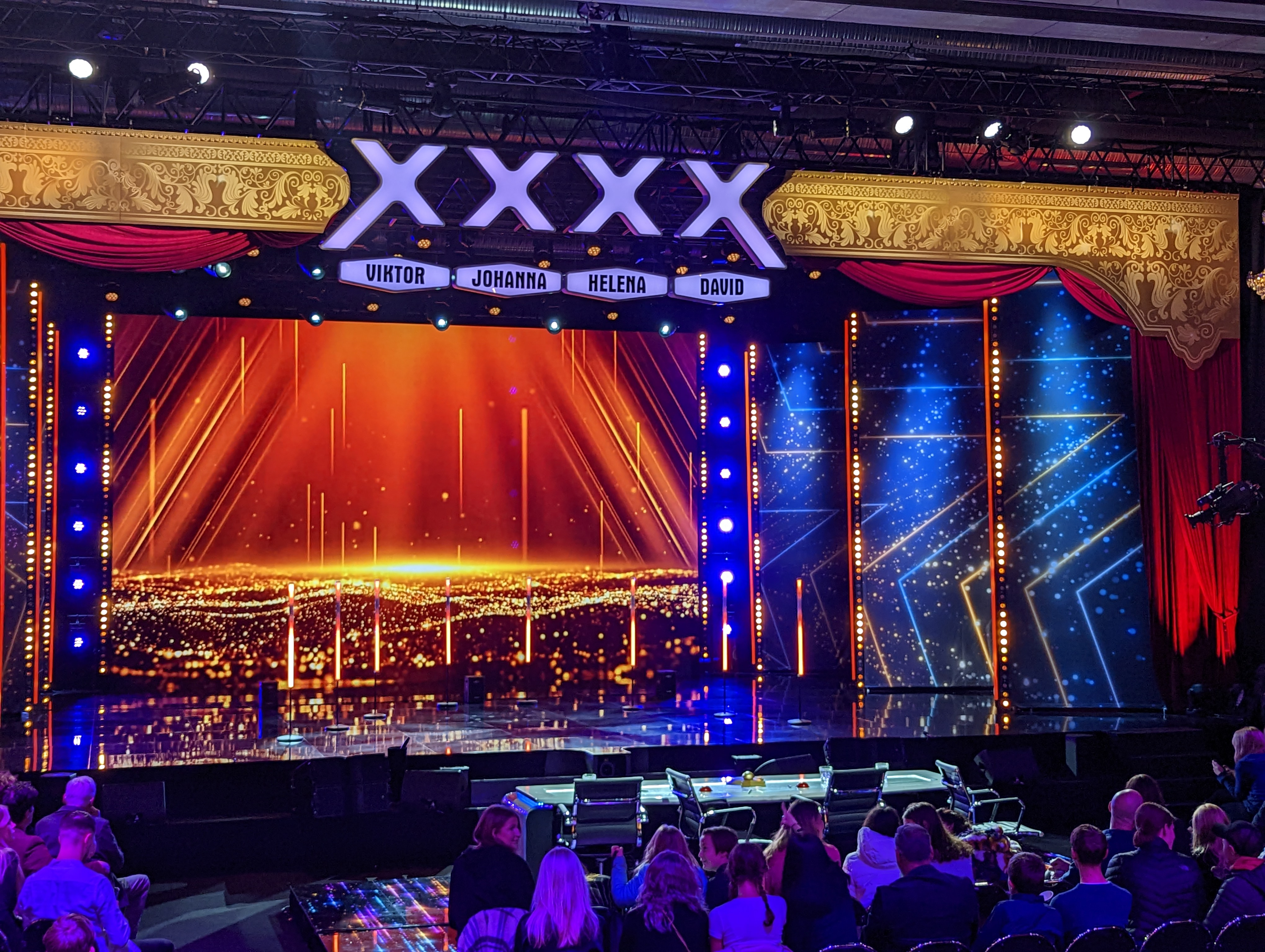
- Hosted by: Pär Lernström
- Judges: David Batra; Helena Bergström; Johanna Nordström; Viktor Norén

Release
- Original network: TV4
- Original release: 14 January 2023 – present

Season chronology
- ← Previous; Talang 2022 Next → Talang 2024

Talang 2023 is the thirteenth season of Swedish Talang and is broadcast on TV4 from 14 January. The host remains Pär Lernström, and the new jury consists of Helena Bergström, Viktor Norén, Johanna Nordström and David Batra. Edward af Sillén, Sarah Dawn Finer and Bianca Ingrosso quit the show as a jury after season twelve.

== Auditions Summary ==
Finalist | Semi-finalist | Golden Buzzer

=== Audition episode 1 (January 13) ===
Contestant	Order	Buzzes and Judges' votes				Result (January 13)
Contestant	Order	Norén	Nordström	Bergström	Batra	Result (January 13)
Staffan Spelman	1					Eliminated
Sophia Paliashchuk	2					Eliminated
Erik Nyberg	3					Eliminated
Frank Maglio	4					Eliminated
Gneben	5					Advanced
Peter Norbert	6					Eliminated
Jennifer Aoun	7					Advanced

At the end of the episode, the jury had to choose two of the five contestants that the majority of the jury had accepted to advance to the semi-finals. They chose Gneben and Jennifer.

=== Audition episode 2 (January 20) ===
Contestant	Order	Buzzes and Judges' votes				Result (January 20)
Contestant	Order	Norén	Nordström	Bergström	Batra	Result (January 20)
Luna Balluni & The Daddy	1					Eliminated
Paulina & Alvin	2					Advanced (Won Public Vote)
Dan Meyer	3					Advanced
Confidance	4					Eliminated
David Åkebrand	5					Eliminated (Lost Public Vote)
Emma & Nando	6					Eliminated
Florian Voss	7					Advanced

At the end of the episode, the jury had to choose two of the five contestants that the majority of the jury had accepted to advance to the semi-finals. They chose Florian and let the public decide which of Paulina & Alvin and David gets the other semi-final spot. At the beginning of the following episode, it was revealed that the public chose Paulina & Alvin.

=== Audition episode 3 (January 27) ===
Contestant	Order	Buzzes and Judges' votes				Result (January 27)
Contestant	Order	Norén	Nordström	Bergström	Batra	Result (January 27)
Orlando	1					Eliminated
Mr Soto	2					Eliminated
Åsa Engman	3					Eliminated
The Carling Sisters	4					Advanced
Noor Al Jabiri	5					Advanced
Chatte & Anto	6					Advanced
Rami Bladlav	7					Eliminated

At the end of the episode, the jury had to choose two of the four contestants that the majority of the jury had accepted to advance to the semi-finals. They chose Chatte & Anto and The Carling Sisters.

=== Audition episode 4 (February 3) ===
Contestant	Order	Buzzes and Judges' votes				Result (February 3)
Contestant	Order	Norén	Nordström	Bergström	Batra	Result (February 3)
Louise Geller	1					Eliminated
Kuba Dancecompany	2					Advanced
Pontus Lindman	3					Advanced
Alte Kamereren	4					Eliminated
Viktor Öhman	5					Eliminated
Wilhelm Åkerlind	6					Advanced

At the end of the episode, the jury had to choose two of the four contestants that the majority of the jury had accepted to advance to the semi-finals. They chose Kuba Dancecompany and Pontus Lindman.

=== Audition episode 5 (February 10) ===
Contestant	Order	Buzzes and Judges' votes				Result (February 10)
Contestant	Order	Norén	Nordström	Bergström	Batra	Result (February 10)
Clara Sakari	1					Eliminated
Calle Sakari	2					Eliminated
Abraham "Abe" Raham	3					Advanced
Elvira "Gullis" Gullberg	4					Advanced (Won Public Vote)
Rydm Crew	5					Eliminated (Lost Public Vote)
Leah Shutkever	6					Eliminated
Andreas Aleman	7					Advanced

At the end of the episode, the jury had to choose two of the five contestants that the majority of the jury had accepted to advance to the semi-finals. They chose Abe and let the public decide which of Gullis and Rydm Crew gets the other semi-final spot. At the beginning of the following episode, it was revealed that the public chose Gullis.

=== Audition episode 6 (February 17) ===
Contestant	Order	Buzzes and Judges' votes					Result (February 17)
Contestant	Order	Norén	Nordström	Bergström	Batra	Lernström (Note: Host)	Result (February 17)
Ludvig & Rasmus	1						Advanced
Samet Yüce	2						Advanced
Children of Ukraine	3						Advanced
Rövbajs	4						Eliminated
Cecilia Linding	5						Eliminated
Johannes Winroth	6						Eliminated

At the end of the episode, the jury had to choose two of the four contestants that the majority of the jury had accepted to advance to the semi-finals. They chose Ludvig & Rasmus and Samet Yüce.

=== Audition episode 7 (February 24) ===
Contestant	Order	Buzzes and Judges' votes				Result (February 24)
Contestant	Order	Norén	Nordström	Bergström	Batra	Result (February 24)
Madelene & Helena	1					Advanced
Twin Power	2					Eliminated
N4te	3					Eliminated
Desideria	4					Eliminated
Bamse och hans vänner	5					Eliminated
Uppsala Dansakademi	6					Advanced
Mio Karlsson	7					Eliminated
Bengt Roos	8					Eliminated

At the end of the episode, the jury had to choose two of the five contestants that the majority of the jury had accepted to advance to the semi-finals. They chose Madelene & Helena and Uppsala Dansakademi.

== Semi-final Summary ==
Won the public vote | Won the Jury's vote | Lost the Jury's vote

=== Semi-final 1 (March 3) ===
Contestant	Order	Buzzes and Judges' votes				Result (March 3)
Contestant	Order	Norén	Nordström	Bergström	Batra	Result (March 3)
Abraham "Abe" Raham	1					Eliminated
David Åkerbrand	2					Eliminated
Uppsala Dansakademi	3					Eliminated (Lost Jury's Vote)
Ludvig & Rasmus	4					Eliminated
The Carling Sisters	5					Eliminated
Jennifer Aoun	6					Advanced (Won Jury's Vote)
Pontus Lindman	7					Advanced (Won Public Vote)

=== Semi-final 2 (March 10) ===
Contestant	Order	Buzzes and Judges' votes				Result (March 10)
Contestant	Order	Norén	Nordström	Bergström	Batra	Result (March 10)
Kuba Dancecompany	1					Eliminated (Lost Jury's Vote)
Madelene & Helena	2					Advanced (Won Jury's Vote)
Gneben	3					Eliminated
Samet Yüce	4					Advanced (Won Public Vote)
Elvira "Gullis" Gullberg	5					Eliminated
Chatte & Anto	6					Eliminated
Florian Voss	7					Eliminated

== Finals Summary ==
Final (March 17)
