= Idol 2026 (Sweden) =

- Season 2026
- Hosted by: Pär Lernström; Keyyo; Oscar Zia; Johanna Nordström; Edvin Törnblom
- Judges: Anders Bagge; Katia Mosally; Peg Parnevik; Oliver Norqvist
- Finals venue: Fildelfia Convention Center, Stockholm

Release
- Original network: TV4
- Original release: 22 August 2026

Season chronology
- ← Previous; Season 2025

Idol 2026 is the twenty-second season of the Swedish Idol series. The season premiered on 22 August 2026 broadcast on TV4.
