= Margaux Flavet =

Swedish singer (born 2008)

- Born: Margaux Milla Brigitte Flavet; 2 September 2008 (age 17); Stockholm, Sweden
- Occupation: Singer
- Years active: 2020–present

Margaux Milla Brigitte Flavet (born 2 September 2008) is a Swedish singer. She won the 2024 season of the Swedish show Idol.

== Career ==
=== Idol ===
Flavet participated as an eleven-year-old in the tenth season of TV program Talangs on TV4, where she managed to reach the final. She also managed to reach the final of the 2024 season of Idol, where she got the chance to compete against Joel Nordenberg and Minou Nilsson. Once in this final, she emerged as the winner on 7 December, becoming the youngest winner in the program's history.

== Discography ==
=== Singles ===
List of singles, with selected chart positions
Title	Year	Peak chart positions	Album
Title	Year	SWE Heat.	Album
"I'll Write Your Name Across the Sky"	2024	—	Non-album singles
