= Talang 2017 =

- Genre: Interactive reality game show
- Presented by: Pär Lernström; Kristina "Keyyo" Petrushina
- Judges: Alexander Bard; David Batra; Kakan Hermansson; LaGaylia Frazier
- Country of origin: Sweden
- Original language: Swedish

Production
- Production company: FremantleMedia

Original release
- Network: TV4
- Release: 18 March – 19 May 2017

Related
- Talang Sverige 2014; Talang 2018

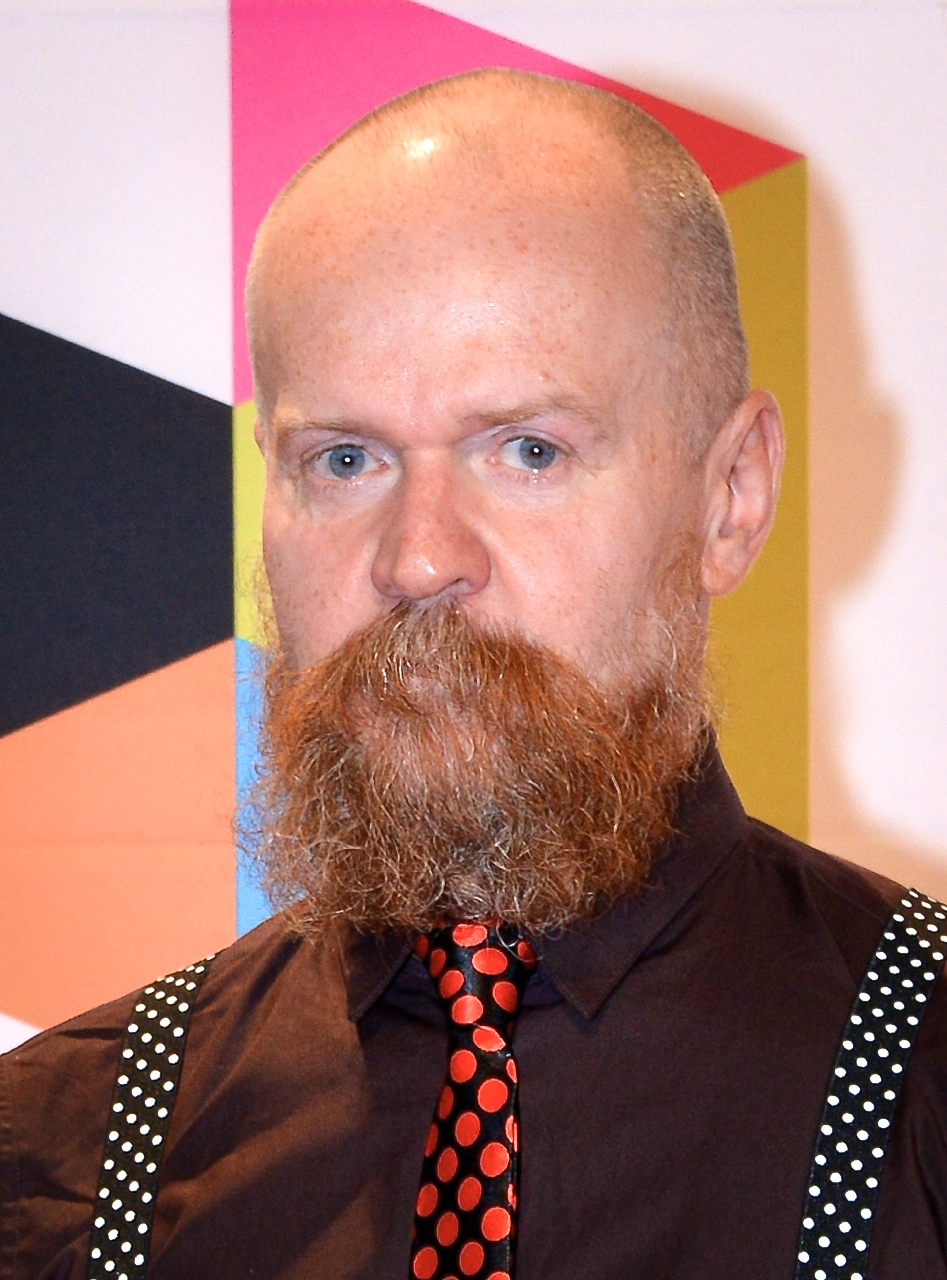
Talang season seven jury member Alexander Bard

Talang 2017 was the seventh season of Talang, the Swedish version of Got Talent. Jury for this season are Alexander Bard, David Batra, Kakan Hermansson and LaGaylia Frazier. Presenters are Pär Lernström and Kristina "Keyyo" Petrushina. The season started airing on 18 March 2017 on TV4. The winner was Ibrahim Nasrullayeu, a 17 year old refugee singer from Azerbaijan.
