= Talang 2020 =

- Season 2020
- Hosted by: Pär Lernström; Samir Badran
- Judges: Alexander Bard; Bianca Ingrosso; LaGaylia Frazier; David Batra

Release
- Original network: TV4
- Original release: 10 January 2020

Season chronology
- ← Previous; Talang 2019 Next → Talang 2021

Talang 2020 is the tenth season of Swedish Talang and is broadcast on TV4 between 10 January – 13 March 2020. Presenters for this season are Pär Lernström and Samir Badran, the jury consists of Alexander Bard, David Batra, Bianca Ingrosso and LaGaylia Frazier.

Because of the spread of the coronavirus, the final on 13 March was held without an audience.
