= Talang 2022 =

- Season 2022
- Hosted by: Pär Lernström
- Judges: David Batra; Bianca Ingrosso; Edward af Sillen; Sarah Dawn Finer

Release
- Original network: TV4
- Original release: 14 January – 18 March 2022

Season chronology
- ← Previous; Talang 2021 Next → Talang 2023

Talang 2022 is the twelfth season of Swedish Talang and is broadcast on TV4 from 14 January. Presenter for this season are Pär Lernström, the jury consists of Sarah Dawn Finer, David Batra, Bianca Ingrosso and Edward af Sillen. Samir Badran left the show as presenter.

The winner of the season was singer Aron Eriksson-Aras.
