= Idol 2023 (Sweden) =

- Season 2023
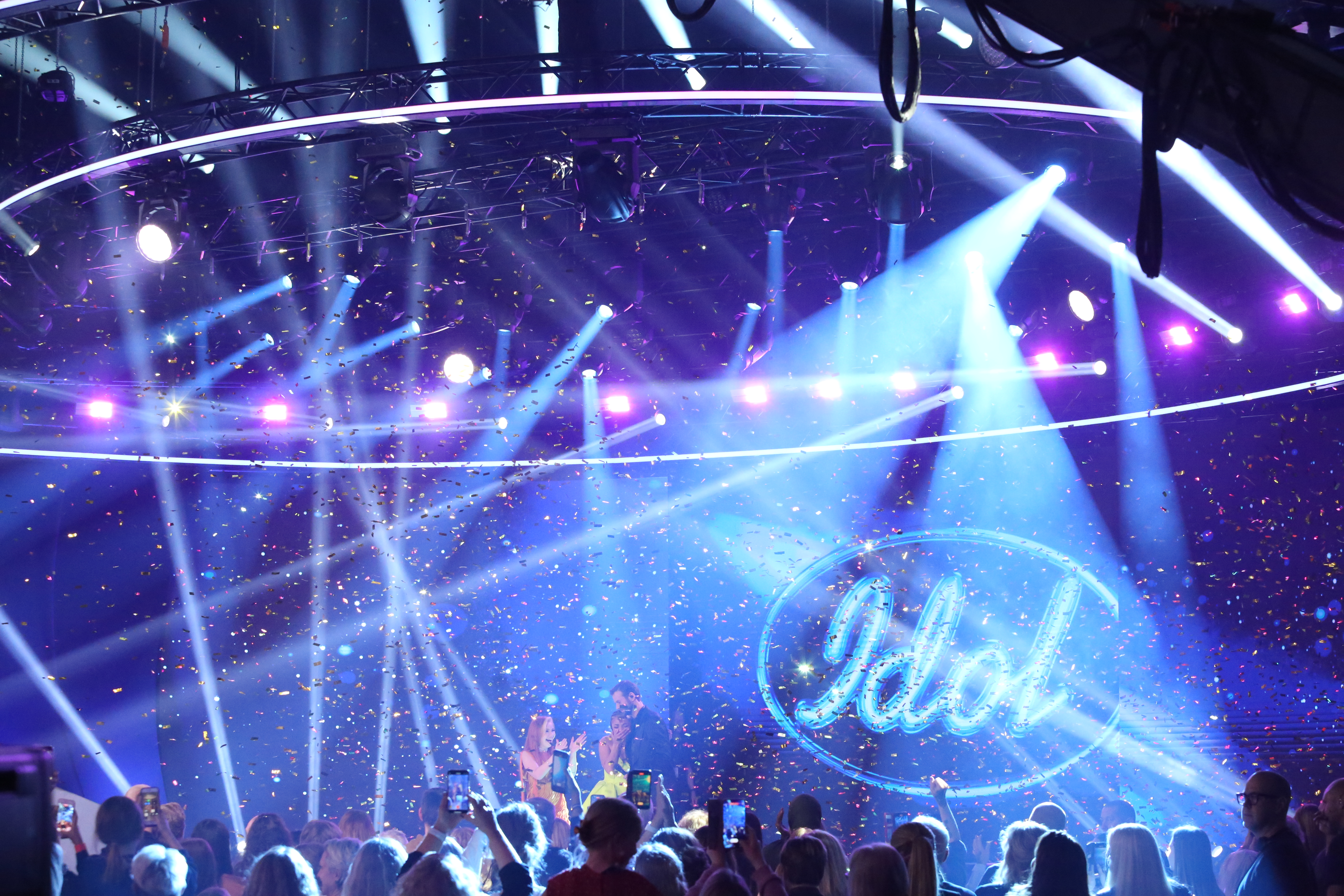
- Finale in Avicii Arena
- Hosted by: Pär Lernström; Amie Bramme Sey; David Sundin (understudy in the third weekly final)
- Judges: Anders Bagge; Katia Mosally; Alexander Kronlund; Kishti Tomita
- Winner: Cimberly Wanyonyi
- Runner-up: Saga Ludvigsson
- Finals venue: Avicii Arena, Stockholm, Sweden

Release
- Original network: TV4
- Original release: 28 August – 1 December 2023

Season chronology
- ← Previous; Season 2022 Next → Season 2024

Idol 2023 is the nineteenth season of the Swedish Idol series. The show was broadcast on TV4 and started on 28 August 2023. Pär Lernström continued as presenter of the show. New for this season was that four singers would coach the auditionees; they were Hanna Ferm, Chris Kläfford, Pa Modou Badjie and Maxida Märak.

Winner of this season was singer Cimberly Wanyonyi.

== Competition ==
=== Elimination chart ===
Stadium:		Qualification week						Weekly finals									Final
Dates:		25/9	26/9	27/9	28/9	29/9		6/10	13/10	20/10	27/10	3/11	10/11	17/11	24/11		1/12
Place	Contestants	Results															
1	Cimberly Wanyonyi		1:st										5:th				Winner
2	Saga Ludvigsson				1:st												Runner-up
3	Simon Näslund				2:nd	WC 9										Eliminated	
4	Louisa Hoxha			2:nd		WC 11				8:th				4:th	Eliminated		
5	Jordan Rawling				2:nd	WC 7						6:th	4:th	Eliminated			
6	Antranik Khantarashian	2:nd				WC 3		11:th		9:th			Eliminated				
7	Tilda Vodusek			1:st							8:th	7:th	Eliminated				
8	Olivia Aliotti	2:nd				WC 10			10:th		Saved	Eliminated					
9	Isak Uddström		2:nd			WC 1	8:th	10:th			7:th	Eliminated					
10	Emil Eriksson		2:nd			WC 5			9:th	Eliminated							
11	Aus Ayob	2:nd				WC 4			Eliminated								
12	Fredrik Strand	1:st						Eliminated									
13	Deya Boström Säfström			2:nd		WC 8	Eliminated										
14	Theo Söderqvist			2:nd		WC 6	Eliminated										
15	Nikolina Lekic		2:nd			WC 2	Eliminated										
16	Ida Zohlen Danielsson				2:nd												
17	Rasmus Dahlström			2:nd													
18	Filip Jukic		2:nd														
19	Alicia Goncalves				Eliminated												
20	Love Strandberg			Eliminated													
21	My Cronblad		Eliminated														
22	Agnes "Liza" Frisk	Eliminated															

Legend
Women	Men	Safe	Bottom 2 / Bottom 3 / Bottom 4	Wild Card	Judges Save	Eliminated

Top 12	Top 22	2nd / 3rd	Stage not reached
