= Talang 2018 =

Season of television series

- Season 2018
- Presented by: Pär Lernström; Kristina "Keyyo" Petrushina
- Judges: Alexander Bard; David Batra; Bianca Wahlgren; LaGaylia
- Winner: Madeleine Hilleard
- Runners-up: Jonas von Essen; Osman

Release
- Original network: TV4
- Original release: 12 January – 16 March 2018

Season chronology
- ← Previous; Talang 2017 Next → Talang 2019

Talang 2018 is the eighth season of the Talang series in Sweden. It will be broadcast on TV4 and premiere on 12 January 2018. Bianca Wahlgren Ingrosso is a new judge after Kakan Hermansson left the series after one season.

== Semi-Final 1 ==
Order	Artist	Act	Buzzes				Finished
Order	Artist	Act	Alexsander	Bianca	LaGaylia	David	Finished
1	Gabriel Fontana	Drag					Eliminated
2	Tousin Chiza	Singer					Eliminated
3	Oliver Häggblom	Magician					Eliminated
4	Marianne & Vega	Dog Act					Advanced
5	Beastbarzz	Balance Act					Eliminated
6	Frida Green	Singer					Advanced
7	Mario Perez	Rapper And Dancer					Eliminated
8	Claes-Martin	Impressionist					Eliminated

== Semi-Final 2 ==
Order	Artist	Act	Buzzes				Finished
Order	Artist	Act	Alexsander	Bianca	LaGaylia	David	Finished
1	Henrik Phung	Singer					Eliminated
2	Stephanie Elovsson-Jägmo	Ventriloquist					Wild card
3	Swedish Gun Factory	Band And Tap Dancers					Eliminated
4	Dao Di Ponziano	Singer					Eliminated
5	Kongcrete connection	Acrobatics					Eliminated
6	Douglas	Close Up Magician					Advanced
7	Abzorb	Dance Group					Eliminated
8	Madeleine Hilleard	Opera Singer					Advanced

== Grand Final ==
Order	Artist	Act	Buzzes				Finished
Order	Artist	Act	Alexsander	Bianca	LaGaylia	David	Finished
1	Marianne & Vega	Dancing Dog Act					Eliminated
2	Gustav	Singer					Eliminated
3	Madeleine Hilleard	Opera Singer					Winner
4	Stephanie Elovsson-Jägmo	Ventriloquist					Eliminated
5	Osman	Rapper					Runners-up
6	Frida Green	Singer					Eliminated
7	Douglas	Magician					Eliminated
8	Jonas	Memory Act					Runners-up
9	Paula Jiven	Singer					Eliminated
