= Talang 2011 =

- Genre: Interactive reality game show
- Presented by: Markoolio; Tobbe Blom
- Starring: Bert Karlsson; Charlotte Perrelli; Henrik Fexeus
- Country of origin: Sweden
- Original language: Swedish
- No. of episodes: 11

Production
- Production company: FremantleMedia

Original release
- Network: TV4
- Release: April 1 – June 10, 2011

Related
- Talang 2010; Talang Sverige 2014

Talang 2011 was the fifth season of the talent show Talang, the Swedish version of Got Talent. Both Bert Karlsson and Charlotte Perrelli returned as judges while Henrik Fexeus became the new third judge. The season featured eleven episodes and started broadcasting on 1 April 2011, with the final held on 10 June 2011. The season was won by speedcuber Simon Westlund. After the 2011 season, TV4 put the show on indefinite hiatus, until TV3 announced in June 2013 that they had acquired the rights for the show and would re-launch the show in Spring 2014 under the name "Talang Sverige".

== Semi-finals Summary ==
In the semi-finals, it is only the viewers who vote until three favorites per semifinals. The talent with the most votes will go directly to the final. Then the jury will take which of the second and third to be able to go to the final.

Judge Disapproved | Judge Approved
Won the public vote | Won the Jury's vote | Eliminated

=== Semi-final 1 ===
Semi-Finalist	Order	Act	Jury's Vote			Results
Semi-Finalist	Order	Act	Karlsson	Perrelli	Fexeus	Results
Christoffer Collins	1	Dancer				Jury's choice
Håkan Berg	2	Comedy Singer				Eliminated
The Flying Circus	3	Model Airplane Display				Eliminated
Sanna	4	Singer				Lost Jury's Vote
Petter Gantelius	5	Acrobat				Eliminated
Bemsha	6	Music Group				Eliminated
Mattis Silins	7	Spoken Word Poet				Eliminated
Rasmus Eriksson	8	Singer				Won Public Vote

=== Semi-final 2 ===
Semi-Finalist	Order	Act	Jury's Vote			Results
Semi-Finalist	Order	Act	Karlsson	Perrelli	Fexeus	Results
Ultimate B-Boys	1	Breakdance Group				Eliminated
Anna Hertzman	2	Singer				Eliminated
Love	3	Singer				Lost Jury's Vote
Dockteatern Svarta Katten	4	Theatre Performer				Eliminated
Just Ahead	5	Band				Eliminated
Rasmus Wurm	6	Burlesque Act				Eliminated
Steve Thoreson	7	Opera Singer				Won Public Vote
Isse Omari	8	Dancer				Jury's choice

=== Semi-final 3 ===
Semi-Finalist	Order	Act	Jury's Vote			Results
Semi-Finalist	Order	Act	Karlsson	Perrelli	Fexeus	Results
Complete	1	Dance Group				Eliminated
Axel & Sabina	2	Magic Duo				Eliminated
The Troubled Three	3	Rockabilly Band				Eliminated
Jecko	4	Entertainer				Won Public Vote
Johan Wendt	5	Singer & Guitarist				Eliminated
Simon Westlund	6	Rubik's Cube Magician				Jury's choice
Cicci	7	Acrobat				Eliminated
Jon Wallner	8	Singer				Lost Jury's Vote

== Final ==
Finalist	Order	Result
Rasmus Eriksson	1	Eliminated
Jecko	2	Eliminated
Christoffer Collins	3	Eliminated
Sanna	4	Eliminated
Simon Westlund	5	Winner
Jon Wallner	6	Eliminated
Isse Omari	7	Eliminated
Steve Thoreson	8	Runner-Up
