= Lego Masters (Swedish season 1) =

TV4 Sweden programme

Lego Masters Sweden (Lego Masters Sverige) is a Swedish competition show where the contestants each week gets a new task of building with lego. The season started airing on 25 October 2020 on TV4. Presenter is Mauri Hermundsson, with Magnus Göransson as judge.
