= Selfish (Eva Jumatate song) =

Single by Eva Jumatate
- Released: 14 February 2026
- Length: 2:55
- Label: Warner Music Sweden AB
- Songwriters: Herman Gardarfve; Eva Jumatate; Ruth Lindegren; Marlene Strand.

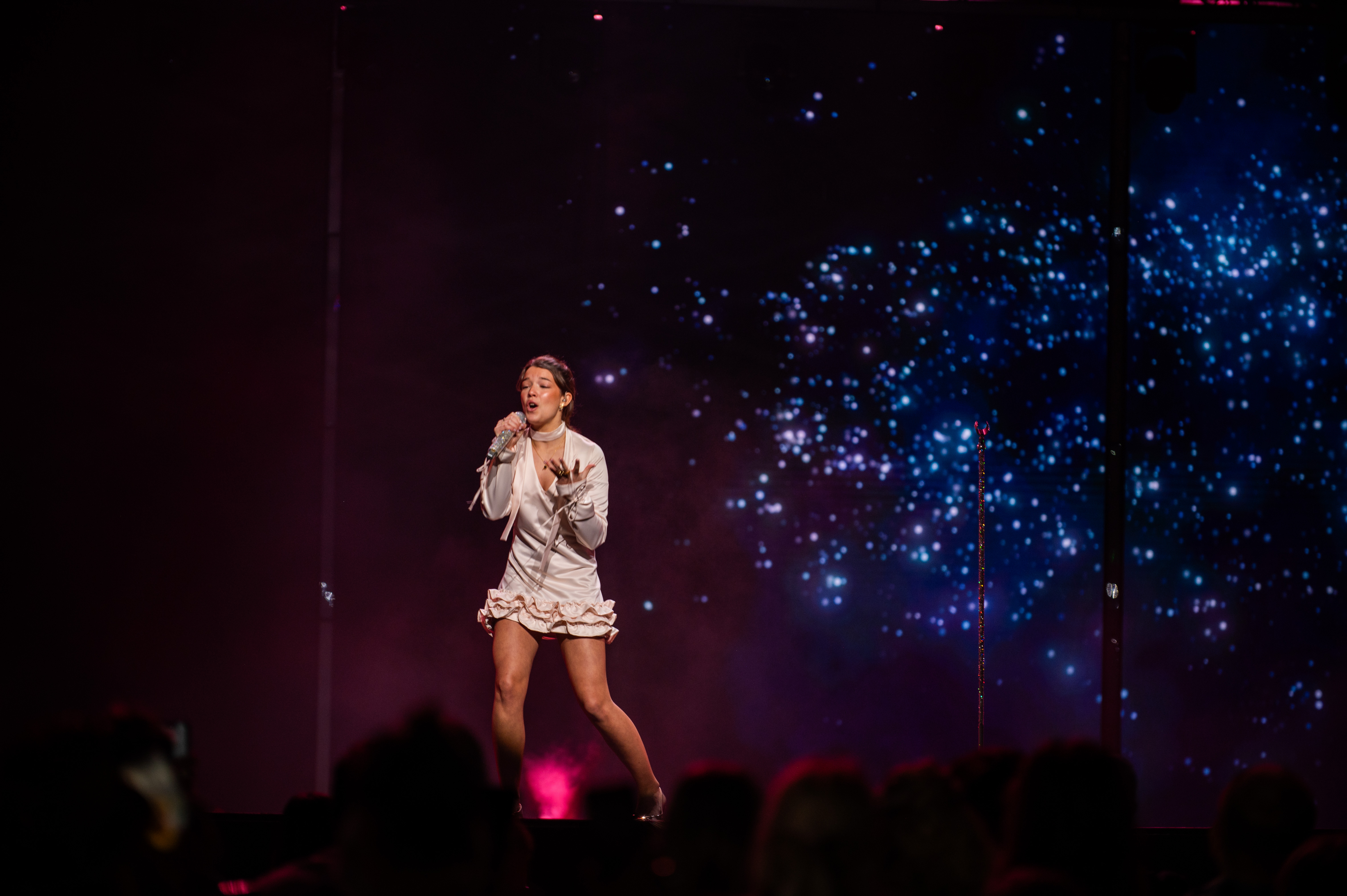
The song performed during the rehearsals for the Melodifestivalen third qualifier round.

"Selfish" is a song by Swedish singer Eva Jumatate , released as a single on 14 February 2026. The song was performed in Melodifestivalen 2026. It qualified for the Final qualification round.

== Charts ==
Chart performance for "Selfish"
Chart (2026)	Peak position
Sweden (Sverigetopplistan)	37
