= Eva Jumatate =

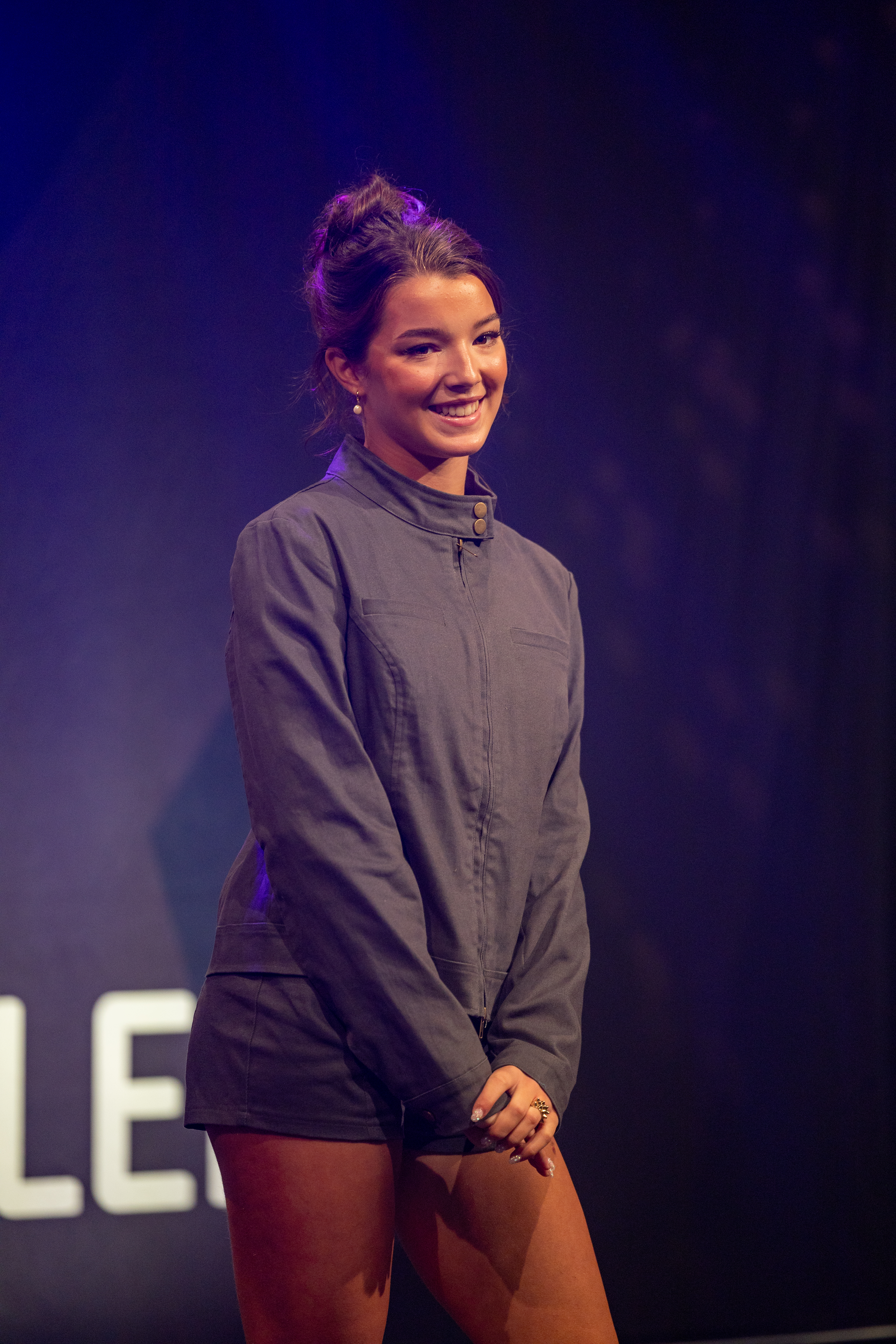
- Eva Jumatate in 2025

Background information
- Born: Eva Katharina Jumatate; 1 January 2008 (age 18)
- Occupation: Singer
- Years active: 2019 - present

Eva Katharina Jumatate (born 1 January 2008) is a Swedish singer. She participated in the talent show Talang 2019, where she made it to the final, finishing as a runner-up. She then had the leading role of Matilda in the production of Matilda the Musical at Malmö Opera. She had the leading role in the SVT series "Kär" as Bianca, as well as in the fifth season of the series "Klassen" where she plays the role of Anja.

Jumatate participated in Melodifestivalen 2026 with the song "Selfish", which competed in Heat 3 and qualified for the final qualification round on 28 February 2026.

== Discography ==
=== Singles ===
Title	Year	Peak chart positions	Album
Title	Year	SWE	Album
"Selfish"	2026	37	Non-album single
