= Charlie Caper =

Swedish magician

- Born: Malmö, Sweden
- Occupation: Magician
- Years active: 2004–present
- Known for: Winner of Talang (2009); Parlour Magic second place at FISM (2009)
- Notable work: Magical (Edinburgh Fringe, Adelaide Fringe)
- Awards: Talang winner (2009); Mandrake d'Or (2011)

Charlie Caper is a magician from Malmö, Sweden. He was the winner of the 2009 season of the talent show Talang, the Swedish version of the Got Talent television series, and was awarded second place in the Parlour Magic category at FISM 2009. He won the Mandrake d'Or in 2011.

Caper travels extensively and has been touring since 2004. As of 2020, he had performed in 53 countries. He performed his show Magical at the Edinburgh Fringe and Adelaide Fringe festivals.
