= Torbjörn Averås Skorup =

Swedish comedian

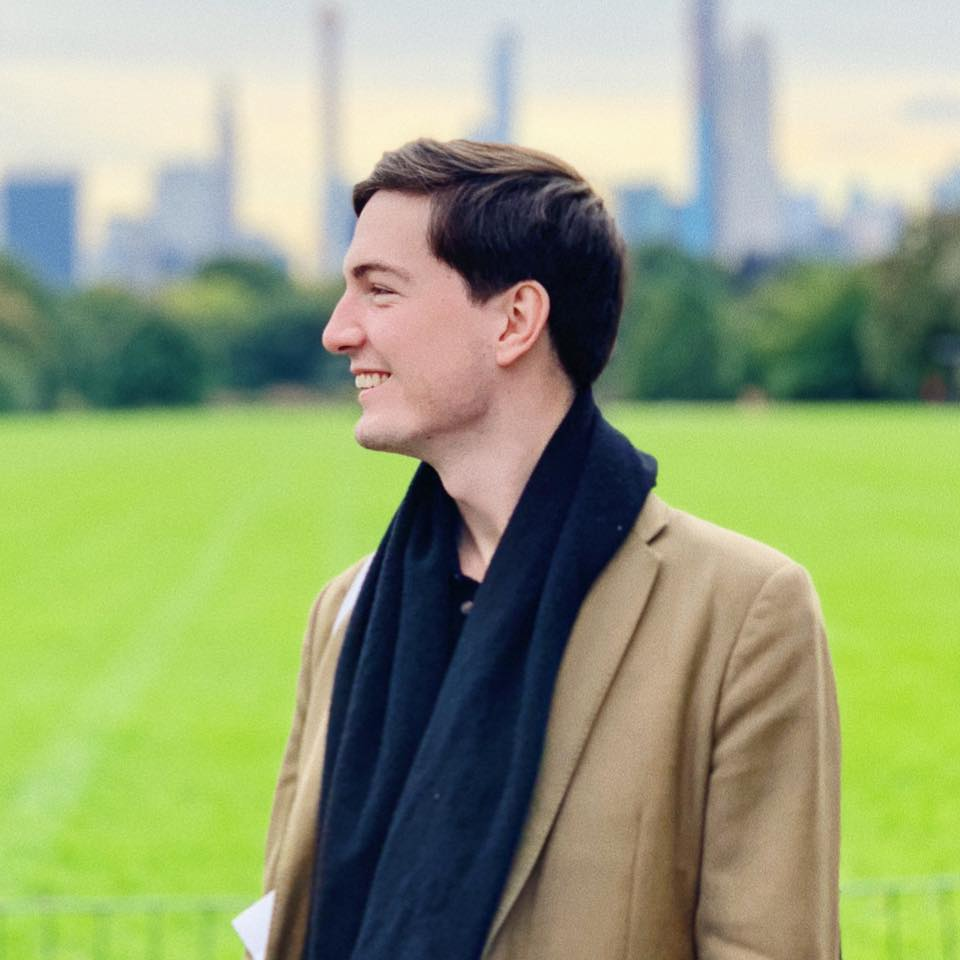
- Born: Jan Torbjörn Averås Skorup; 21 April 1995 (age 31); Karlstad, Sweden

Jan Torbjörn Averås Skorup (born 21 April 1995) is a Swedish comedian and radio presenter. In 2017, he along with Johanna Nordström presented the Sveriges Radio show Humorn i P3. He has also presented the radio shows i Morgonpasset i P3 and Eftermiddag i P3. In 2023, he participated in the SVT series "Överlevarna" along with several other comedians.
