= Unitwins =

Swedish performing arts sibling duo

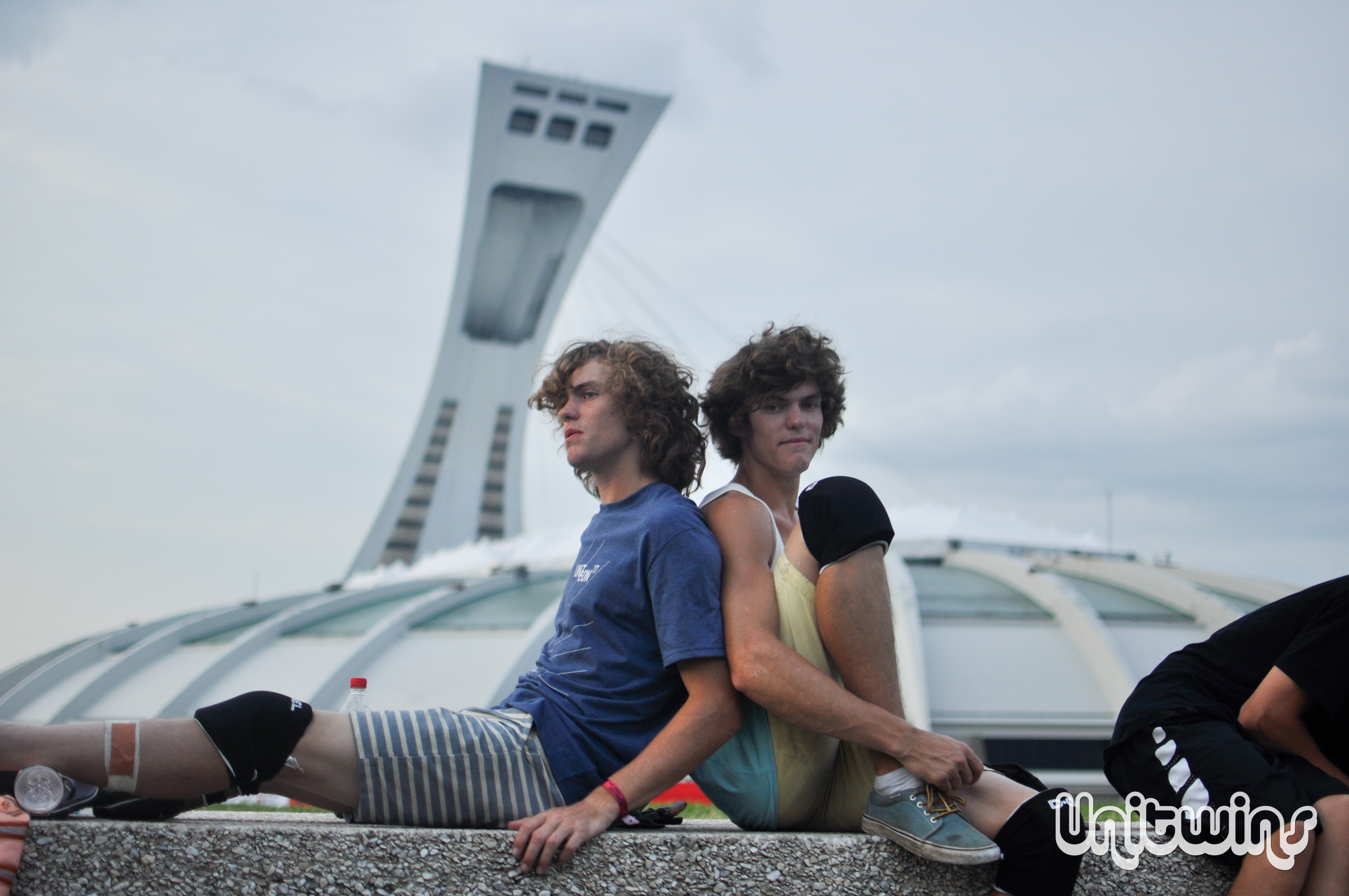

Unitwins are a unicycling entertainment duo from Sweden, consisting of twins Martin Sjönneby and Josef Sjönneby.

The two brothers compete internationally in extreme unicycling, and draw on their long experience in the sport to put on unicycle shows all over Scandinavia.

In 2013 they were voted Sweden's third best entertainment in the television program Rampljuset and in 2014 they reached the semifinals of Talang, the Swedish version of America's Got Talent. During the shooting of the latter the duo drew attention when Josef landed on Martin's head during a trick, but managed to minimize the impact of the blow and continue the show without any of them getting hurt.

== Performances on television ==
- Talang 2010
- Finals Rampljuset 2012
- Semifinals Talang 2014
- Hjärnkontoret 2014
- Efter tio 2014
