= Emil Hansius =

Swedish YouTuber (born 1995)

- Born: Emil Berglund Hansius; February 23, 1995 (age 31); Piteå, Norrbotten, Sweden
- Occupation: YouTuber

YouTube information
- Channel: @EmilHansius
- Years active: 2016–present
- Subscribers: 539 thousand
- Views: 208,684,907
- Last updated: August 1st, 2026

Emil Hansius (born February 23, 1995) is a Swedish YouTuber and influencer from Piteå who has made himself known through his YouTube channel where he publishes humor and reaction videos. The channel was started in 2016 and has over 400,000 subscribers (as of 7 April 2024). Hansius has been listed as one of the most powerful Swedes on YouTube, according to Maktbarometern.

Emil Hansius started his YouTube channel in 2016 and has since shared his everyday life and adventures, from reactions to popular Swedish programmes and trends, to collaborations. He has participated in a variety of projects and challenges that are documented on his channel. Among other things, he has tested life as a police officer, life as an SHL star for a day and "EPA-raggare".

Hansius has described himself as a "Norrbotten Patriot" who wants to show the beauty and various sides of the province through his content. In 2023 he was named Piteås Resident of the Year, with his work to promote Piteå and Norrbotten being part of the motivation.

Hansius is in a domestic partnership with Josefine Kitti, with whom he had a twin boy and girl in 2022. A reality series featuring the pair premiered in April 2024 on Sveriges Television, the series, Hansius å Kitti - twins edition, covers their life as parents of twins.

== Influence ==
Maktbarometern (en: the Power Barometer) published by Mediaakademin (en: the Media Academy) and measuring influence among Swedes in social media ranked Hansius for the first time in 2020 as one of the thirty "most powerful" on YouTube. The following year he also became one of the thirty highest ranked in the list of "power holders of the year" who bring influence in all platforms that the Power Barometer follows. In 2023, he achieved his highest positions on these rankings to date as the fourth most powerful on YouTube and eleventh in the list of "power holders of the year".

	2019	2020	2021	2022	2023
Most powerful on YouTube	84	29	8	7	4
Incumbent of the year		82	26	19	11
