= Simon Westlund =

Swedish speedcuber

Simon Westlund (born 29 July 1994, in Trollhättan) is a speedcuber from Sweden. He is the former megaminx single world record holder. Westlund participated in a talent show Talang 2011, where he won and received the 500,000 SEK prize money as a result. He was one of the best "cubers" for the megaminx event in between 2011–2012 in which he got 4 world records in the event. He has attended 46 competitions in the WCA since his first in 2008
