= Idol 2024 (Sweden) =

- Season 2024
- Hosted by: Pär Lernström; Mauri Hermundsson
- Judges: Anders Bagge; Katia Mosally; Peg Parnevik; Ash Pournouri
- Winner: Margaux Flavet
- Runner-up: Joel Nordenberg

Release
- Original network: TV4
- Original release: 31 August – 7 December 2024

Season chronology
- ← Previous; Season 2023

Idol 2024 is the twentieth season of the Swedish Idol series. It premiered on 31 August 2024 on TV4. New judges for this season is Ash Pournouri and Peg Parnevik. Co-host for this season is Mauri Hermundsson with Pär Lernström as host.

Winner of this season was singer Margaux Flavet.

== Competition ==
=== Elimination chart ===
Stadium:		Weekly finals								Final
Dates:		12/10	19/10	26/10	2/11	9/11	16/11	23/11	30/11	7/12
Place	Contestants	Results								
1	Margaux Flavet									Winner
2	Joel Nordenberg									Runner-up
3	Minou Nilsson						5:th	5:th		3rd Place
4	Robin Sohlberg								Eliminated	
5	Leo Tekiel								Eliminated	
6	Victoria Grace Larsson						6:th	Eliminated		
7	Lukas Söderholm						Eliminated			
8	Ella Ekholm				9:th	8:th	Eliminated			
9	Olivia Oyemade Merenius		10:th			Eliminated				
10	Lucas Schönefeld		11:th	10:th	Eliminated					
11	Paulina Velasquez Gallegos			Eliminated						
12	Robin Hörnkvist	12:th	Eliminated							
13	Benjamin Löfquist	13:th	Eliminated							
14	Leon Cotter	Eliminated								

Legend
Women	Men	Safe	Bottom 2 / Bottom 3 / Bottom 4	Eliminated	Stage not reached
