= Marcus Oscarsson =

Swedish political commentator

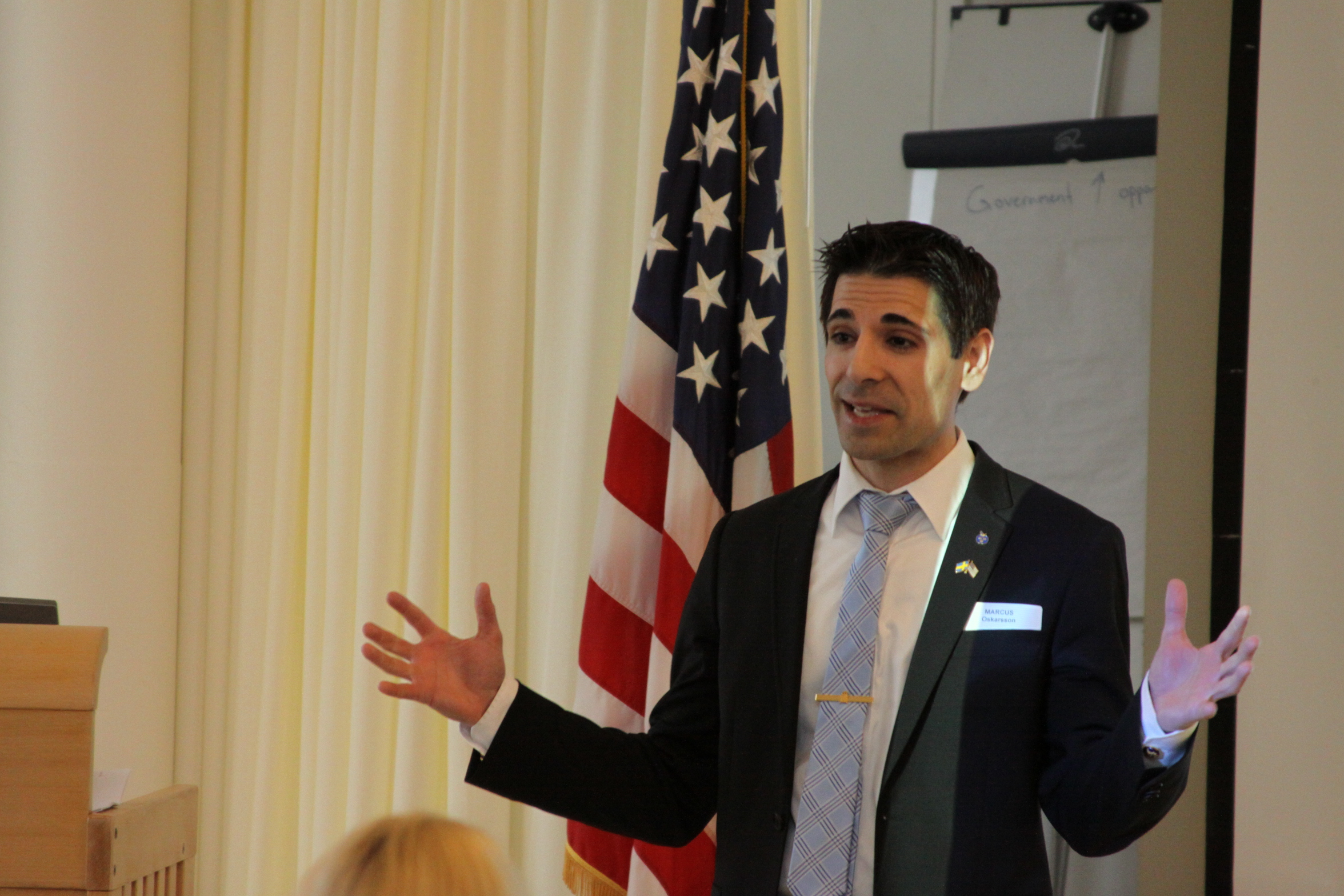
- Marcus Oscarsson speaking at the US Embassy in Stockholm in 2010
- Born: Marcus Oskarsson; 21 March 1976 (age 50); Hultsfred, Sweden
- Occupations: Political commentator, Speaker, Journalist

Marcus Oskarsson (born 21 March 1976) is a Swedish political commentator and journalist. He is best known as a political expert commentator for TV4.

== Early life ==
Marcus Oscarsson studied in Hultsfred, Sweden and then continued his studies in economy at the Linnaeus University in Växjö. In 2006, he started working at the Regeringskansliet for the government, and then became a trainee at the chambers of commerce in Denver.

== Career ==
For five years Oscarsson was a local reporter for the newspaper Vimmerby Tidning; he then worked at Barometern-OT, a local newspaper in Oskarshamn for twelve years. He has since also been a reporter for The Times, The Sunday Times, and the Daily Mail, being the newspapers' reporter for the Nordic region. He has also been a reporter for The Daily Telegraph and the news bureau GlobalPost. In Sweden he has been a political commentator for TT, Aftonbladet, and Aktuellt at SVT. He has since 2012 been the political expert for TV4.

Since 2004, he has been a guest speaker in politics and political science at the University of Denver in Colorado. Oscarsson has commented on the US presidential election in 2012 and 2016 for TV4, as well as the Swedish general elections in Sweden for the same channel in 2014 and 2018. In 2015, he was nominated for a Kristallen television award for TV personality of the Year.
