= Malin Gramer =

Swedish actress and television presenter

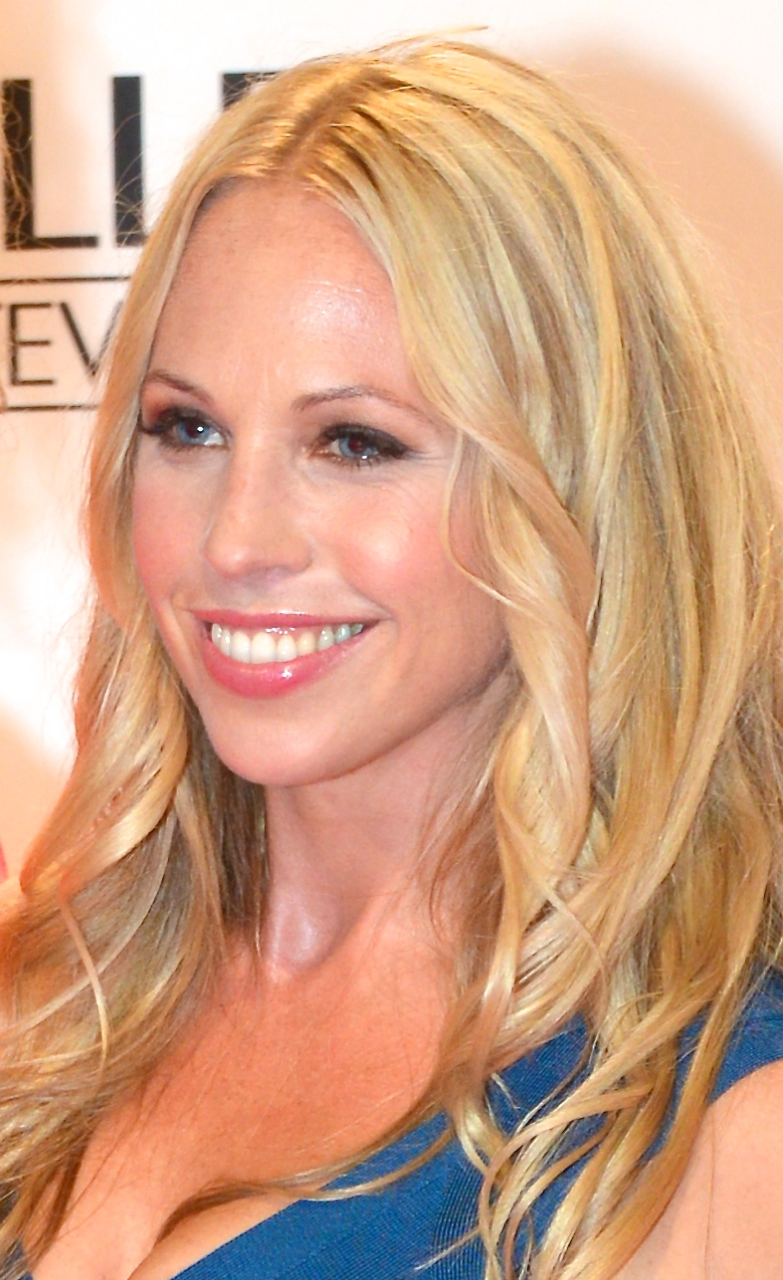
- Gramer in 2013
- Born: Malin Veronica Gramer; 26 April 1978 (age 48); Danderyd, Sweden
- Occupation: Television presenter
- Known for: Paradise Hotel
- Spouse: Carl Falk (m. 2019)
- Children: 2 (one with Falk)

Malin Veronica Gramer (born 26 April 1978, Vallentuna, Sweden) is a Swedish actress and television presenter. Gramer starred in the film Trekant (1994) in which she had the lead role. She has presented the kids show Lattjo Lajban broadcast on TV4, and the game show Lyckochansen at TV3. In 2011–2013, Gramer presented Fråga Olle, a documentary series on sexuality, which was broadcast on Kanal5 and in 2013, she also hosted Min man kan on the same channel. Since 2013, she is also presenting Paradise Hotel on TV3, while she has also co-hosted Talang Sverige 2014 along with Adam Alsing, she also presented the show Jagad av hundar. On 24 August 2019, TV4 announced that it had recruited Gramer as host of the channel's reality show Love Island Sverige.

She was born on 26 April 1978.
