= Henrik Fexeus =

Swedish mentalist, author and TV host

- Born: Henrik Andreas Bjarneskans; 29 September 1971 (age 54); Örebro, Sweden
- Occupations: Mentalist, writer, lecturer, tv host
- Writing career
- Genre: Popular psychology
- Notable works: The Art of Reading Minds, Mind Storm, BOX
- Notable awards: The Dunninger Award, Pocket Platinum, Pocket Gold, Input Honorable Mention
- Website: www.henrikfexeus.se

Henrik Fexeus (born 29 September 1971) is a Swedish mentalist, author and TV-host. Since 2005 he is a frequent guest, as expert on body language and non-verbal communication, in television and newspapers including for Expressen at the Swedish Crown Princess Victoria's wedding and for Aftonbladet during the US SuperTuesday 2016.

He competed as a celebrity dancer in Let's Dance 2022, which was broadcast by TV4.

== Early life and education ==
Henrik Fexeus was born in Örebro, Sweden and grew up in Vallentuna, where he moved seven years old.

Henrik has a BA in Philosophy from Stockholm University and has worked in communications and marketing.

== Author ==
Fexeus has written seven books on practical psychology and influence. His first book, The art of reading minds, was released in 2007 by Forum Bokförlag. In 2010, it received the Pocket Platinum sales award. His second book, When you do what I want, was released in 2008 and received in 2010 the Pocket Gold award.

As of 2019, his books have been translated into over 30 languages, including Chinese, Romanian, Russian, Serbian, Japanese and Portuguese. Fexeus books have sold more than a million copies worldwide. Since 2019 he is published by St. Martin's Press in USA and by Hodder & Stoughton in the UK.

The first edition of the book The power game had on its cover a picture of Henrik with devil horns, but the image allegedly offended people outside Sweden, so the picture was changed to Henrik with halo and angel wings.

In 2015 Henrik Fexeus released the board game The power struggle – a manipulative family game. The game was based on psychological techniques that Fexeus had written about in previous books and was designed by Henrik Fexeus and Per Nystedt. The power struggle was issued by the game publisher Tactic.

2017 saw Fexeus' debut as a fiction writer, with the urban fantasy thriller The Lost: The Last Illusion Book One.

2019 marked his first collaboration with another writer, with the book Reload, co-written by Catharina Edlund.

=== Selected works ===
- 2007 – Konsten att läsa tankar (The Art of Reading Minds: How to understand and influence others without them noticing), Stockholm, Forum, 2007. ISBN 9789137131269
- 2008 – När du gör som jag vill (When you do what I want: A book on influence), Stockholm, Forum, 2008. ISBN 9789137133614
- 2009 – Alla får ligga (Everybody gets some: Strategies in the art of seduction for the modern gentleman and woman), Stockholm, Forum, 2009. ISBN 9789137135335
- 2011 – Konsten att få mentala superkrafter (The Art of getting Mental Super Powers: Be smarter, happier and find the meaning of life without any effort (almost)), Stockholm, Forum, 2011. ISBN 9789137136257
- 2012 – Bli kreativ – på 1 timme (Get Creative – in 1 hour), Stockholm, Forum, 2012. ISBN 9789137139401
- 2012 – Öka din sociala kompetens – på 1 timme (Boost your Social Skills – in 1 hour), Stockholm, Forum, 2012. ISBN 9789137137537
- 2013 – Maktspelet (The Power Game: Sympathetic techniques to take control of everything), Stockholm, Forum, 2013. ISBN 9789137141596
- 2015 – Maktkampen (The Power Struggle – a manipulative family game), Stockholm, Tactic, 2015
- 2017 – De förlorade: Den sista illusionen, bok ett (The Lost: The Last Illusion, book one), Stockholm, Rabén 6 Sjögren, 2017. ISBN 9789129697117
- 2017 – Fingertoppskänsla: En nödvändig manual i social kompetens (Finesse: A manual in social skills), Forum, 2017. ISBN 9789137150284
- 2018 – De ihåliga: Den sista illusionen, bok två (The Hollow; The Last Illusion, book two), Stockholm, Rabén & Sjögren, 2018. ISBN 9789129703962
- 2019 – Konsten att läsa tankar: Omarbetad och utökad (The Art of Reading Minds: Expanded and Revised), Stockholm, Forum, 2019.
- 2019 – Reload: Så blir du återhämtningssmart (Reload), Stockholm, Forum, 2019. ISBN 9789137154053
- 2019 – De första: Den sista illusionen, bok tre (The First: The Last Illusion, book three), Stockholm, Rabén & Sjögren, 2019. ISBN 978-91-29-71633-7
- 2021 – Co-author, with crime writer Camilla Läckberg, Box
- 2022 – Co-author, with Camilla Läckberg, Kult
- 2023 – Co-author, with Camilla Läckberg, Mirage

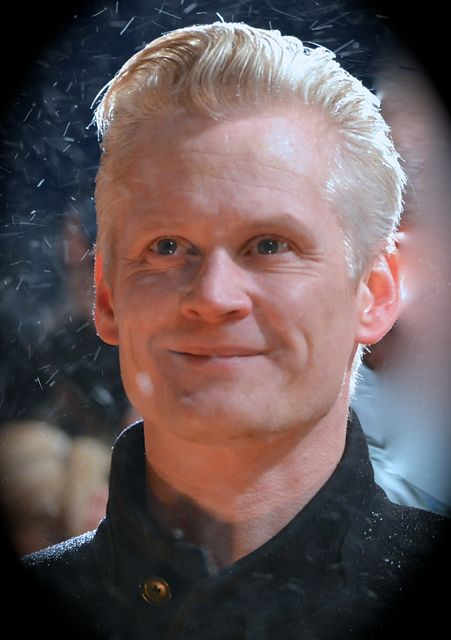
Henrik Fexeus at Jack Reacher premiere

== The TV host ==
Fexeus television appearances often deal with the same psychological topics as his books. He has appeared in both his own programs and already established program formats.

- In 2007–2009 Fexeus wrote and performed the 16 episode TV special Mind Storm, which aired on Swedish Television. This was his first major public appearance (along with the book The art of reading minds the same year). In Mind Storm, Henrik performed psychological experiments on people who were often not aware that they were participating in an experiment. These experiments formed the basis for a further discussion of human behavior with different psychological experts. Reporter in Mind Storm was Charles Franz. Mind Storm has also been shown in Norway, Denmark and Finland and was one of the programs that represented SVT at the television Fair INPUT in Johannesburg in 2008.
- In 2010 Henrik Fexeus led seven episodes of the discussion program Theme: at the Knowledge Channel, also for SVT's behalf.Theme: discussed such diverse topics as entrepreneurship, dyslexia and cancer.
- In 2011 Fexeus was a jury member on Sweden's Got Talent on TV4, along with Bert Karlsson and Charlotte Perrelli. Fexeus task was to assess the participants' body language and stage presence.
- In 2013 Fexeus hosted the video blog Headquarters, along with journalist Susanne Delastacia. Headquarters ran for 13 episodes and produced by United Screens.
- In 2014 Henrik Fexeus was back at SVT with the program Love Code. The format was developed by Endemol and was met with some criticism when it was broadcast.
- During Almedalsveckan 2014, Fexeus was the body language expert for TV4 and P4 with Lotta Bromé. In TV4 Nyhetsmorgon was part of a panel that included Marcus Oscarsson and Elaine Eksvärd, where his job was to review the political party leaders' body language and nonverbal communication during their interviews. In P4 he was similarly analyzing the party leaders, based on their public speeches.
- Henrik Fexeus continued to be a part of TV4 Nyhetsmorgon's election coverage until the elections in 2014, where he examined the party leaders' body language in the final debates. His collaboration with Nyhetsmorgon continued in 2014 to the spring of 2015, where he presented weekly psychological experiments to demonstrate human behaviour.
- Between February 2015 and January 2017, Henrik Fexeus was a distinguished panel member of the radio show Dilemma, broadcast by Mix Megapol every Saturday and Sunday. Dilemma was led by television profile Anders S Nilsson and presenteds problems submitted for the panel to resolve. In addition to Henrik, the most common panelists were Josefin Crafoord and Thomas Järvheden, but Claes Malmberg, Martin Timell and Tobias Karlsson has also visited the program.
- In 2016, Henrik analysed the body language of the US presidential candidates during the campaign period for Aftonbladet TV.
- Henrik hosted the podcast "Kan Själv: En podcast om varför vi är som vi är" ("By myself: A podcast about why we are the way we are") 2017–2018, produced by NENT media group, in 30 episodes.
- During the Swedish election of 2018, Henrik analysed the non-verbal communication of the Swedish political party leaders for SVT's morning news show MorgonStudion.

== The lecturer ==
Since 2005, Henrik Fexeus gives talks based on his books. His lectures deal with non-verbal communication, relationship-building, and "mental super powers". Henrik lectures in Swedish and English all over the world, e.g. in Norway, Mexico, Finland and Spain. His presentations are most often targeted towards corporations and organisations, but in 2018–2019 Henrik toured the theatres in Sweden with his full-evening talk "Your Social Super Powers".

== The mentalist ==
Fexeus is an entertainer within the magic discipline of mentalism. Mentalism uses techniques from psychology, magic and theater to create the illusion of a supernatural ability of mind reading or influence. Other famous mentalists are Uri Geller and Derren Brown. In 2009 Henrik Fexeus was presented with the international award The Dunninger Award from the organization "Psychic Entertainers Association", an award which in 2006 went to the aforementioned Derren Brown and 2010 to Uri Geller. Henrik Fexeus has performed four large stage shows. The last three also become nationwide tours in Seden. To the show BOX (2015–2016), Henrik Fexeus also produced two hours of original music.

Circus of the Mind was produced as DVD by Cinematic Vision in 2011. In Your Head was released on DVD by NjutaFilms in 2013.

- Mind Melt (2004) Written and directed by Henrik Fexeus. Premiere at Dieselverkstaden, Nacka.
- Circus of the Mind (2009–2011) Written by Henrik Fexeus, directed by Henrik Fexeus and Henrik Hjelt. Premiere at Gävle Theatre.
- In Your Head (2012–2013) Written by Henrik Fexeus, directed by Peder Bjurman. Premiere at Rival, Stockholm.
- BOX (2015–2016) Written by Henrik Fexeus and Morgan Alling, directed by Morgan Alling. Music Henrik Fexeus. Premiere at the Maxim Theatre in Stockholm.

== Personal life ==
Fexeus lives in Stockholm and his family consists of his partner and three children. He has two children from a previous marriage with interior blogger Emma Fexeus, and is since 2018 married to Linda Ingelman.
