= Robert Aschberg =

Swedish television personality (born 1952)

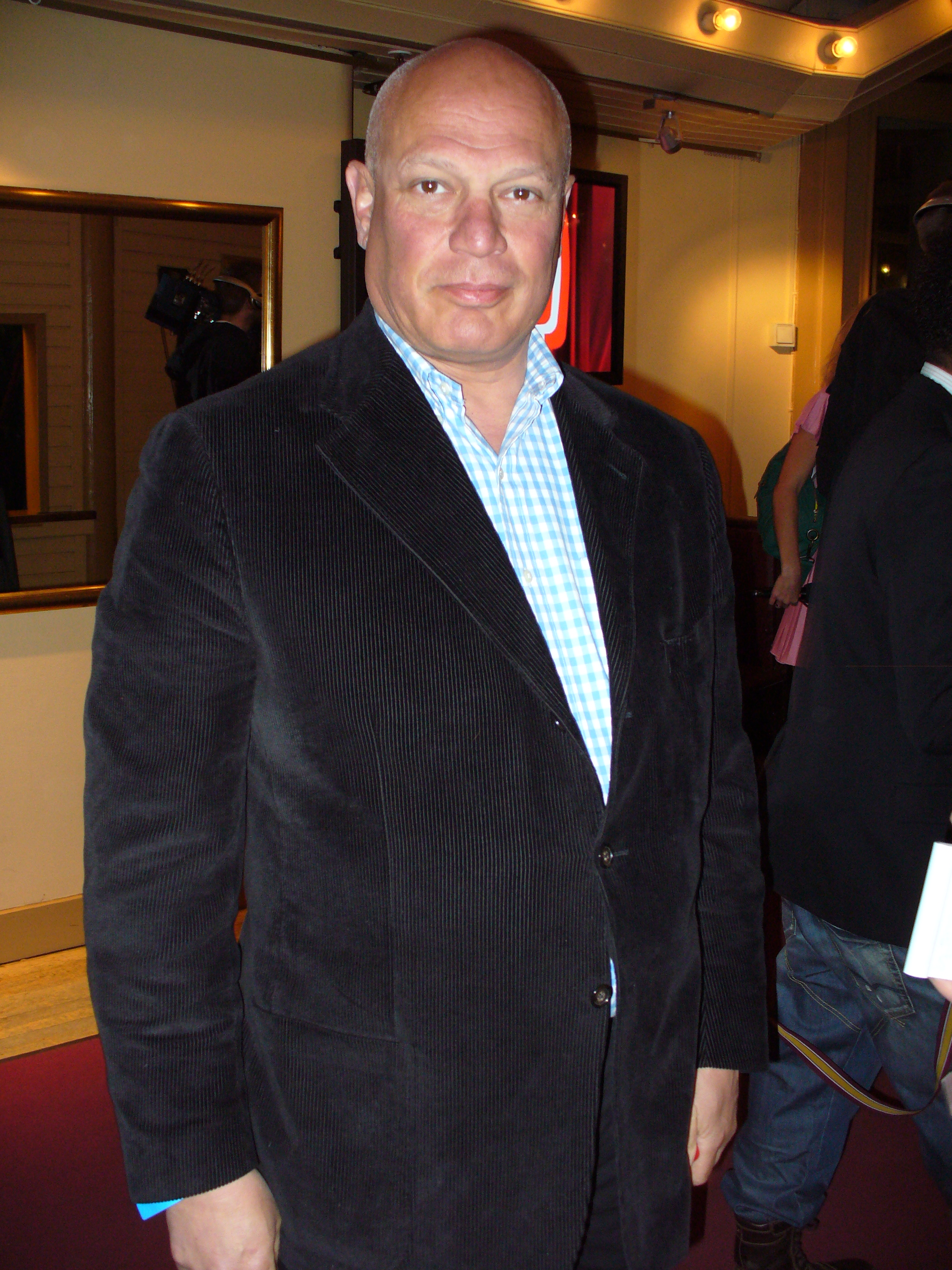
- Aschberg in 2007
- Born: 19 March 1952 (age 74); Kungsholmen, Stockholm, Sweden
- Occupations: Journalist, Television host
- Spouse: Lotta Aschberg
- Children: Annika Aschberg

Robert Aschberg (born 19 March 1952) is a Swedish journalist and media executive. He works for the Swedish television channel TV3. Robert Aschberg was a Maoist in his youth, but in the seventies he left communism for mainstream entertainment. Robert is the grandson of Olof Aschberg, a Swedish bank entrepreneur.
