= Kakan Hermansson =

Swedish television presenter, radio host, comedian and artist

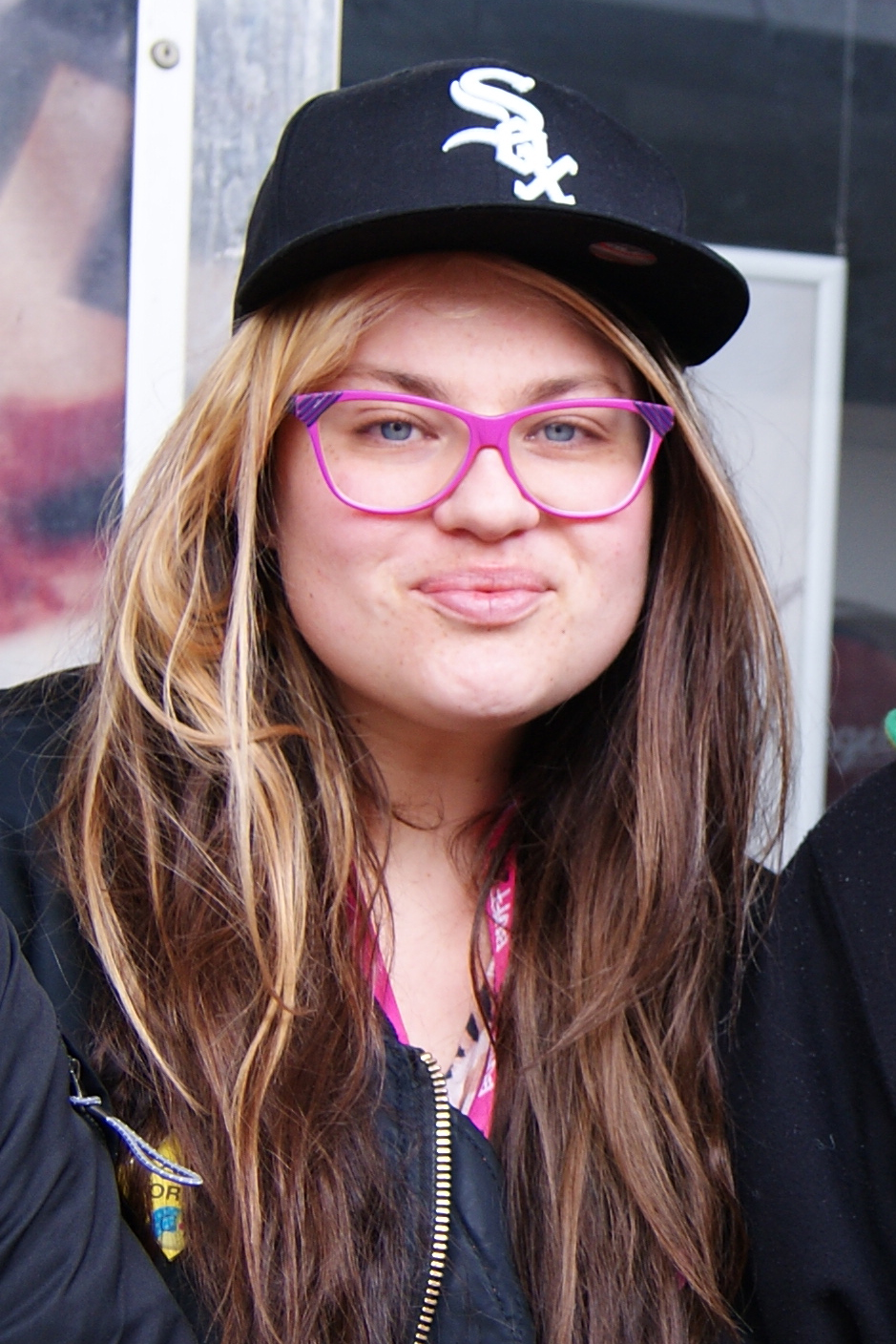
- Kakan Hermansson (2013)
- Born: Karin Signhild Hermansson; 7 August 1981 (age 44); Lund, Sweden
- Occupations: Television presenter; Radio host; Comedian; Artist
- Known for: Kaka på Kaka, Idol 2013

Karin Signhild Hermansson (born 7 August 1981), better known as Kakan Hermansson, is a Swedish television presenter, radio host, comedian and artist. She has had her own television show on Sveriges Television (SVT) called Kaka på Kaka and has worked on shows for both Sveriges Radio and TV4. A graduate of the Stockholm art academy Konstfack, she works with a feminist art collective and has exhibited her (mostly ceramic) art in various places. She calls herself a radical feminist and anarchist.

== Career ==
=== Television ===
Kakan Hermansson was first featured in the comedy show Locash, first broadcast on the Swedish ZTV television network in 2008. She played a "hip hop-slacker" version of herself for three seasons.

Along with Swedish model and musician Julia Frej, she started making comedy music videos under the name "Kakan och Julia". The videos appeared on the SVT show SVT Humor in 2010. Due to the popularity of their videos, SVT offered them their own television show, Kaka på Kaka, which continued for two seasons. The show mixed comedy and serious interviews with a variety of celebrities.

Hermansson was an assistant to Pär Lernström on the radio programme PP3 at Sveriges Radio. In 2013, Hermansson was a travelling reporter for the TV4 show Veckans svensk on which Lernström was the presenter, and was also his assistant on TV4's Idol 2013.

=== Radio ===
In early June 2014, Hermansson was announced as the host of one episode of the popular Sveriges Radio P1 show Sommar i P1. Hermansson criticised the lack of diversity in Sveriges Radio's selection of hosts for the show, saying "It makes me terribly angry to see how very white we are sitting here. We do not represent Sweden," referring to those attending the press conference for the show. Hermansson also said that she was shocked at how "Swedish" the whole event was. Journalist Mustafa Can criticised Hermansson's comments in an article in the Aftonbladet newspaper.

=== Art ===
As an artist, Hermansson's works express ideas about gender, class, and sexuality. She graduated from Konstfack, a Swedish university college of art, crafts, and design, and among other projects arranged a nail art convention as part of her work toward her degree. She works mostly with ceramics and has had exhibitions at Stockholm's NAU Gallery and Gustavsberg's arthall. Hermansson is one of six members of the feminist art collective Den nya kvinnogruppen (The new women's group) which was created in early 2013 in reaction to the dominance by male artists of the Swedish art scene.

Hermansson is a lesbian and identifies as a feminist. On 28 May 2014, Hermansson held an art exhibition during the "West Pride", an LGBT festival in Gothenburg.

Hermansson held an exhibition at a museum run by Kristianstad council shortly after having been sacked from the Audi Q2 marketing campaign. The Facebook page comment section closed due to the high number of critical posts and police protection was provided for the exhibition.

=== Controversy ===
In 2012, Hermansson expressed controversial comments about Swedish police and men in general on Twitter. When she was hired in 2016 for a campaign by a marketing firm to take part in designing a version of the Audi Q2, Audi customers protested in social media against her participation, citing her inflammatory views. Audi chose to end the collaboration and apologised. Shortly after having been sacked from the Audi marketing campaign, she publicly apologised to all police officers in Sweden for her inflammatory comments four years earlier, using her personal blog.

In October 2023, Hermansson faced criticism for using derogatory language, referring to Aron Flam as "scum" in a comment on Instagram. This incident occurred after Flam had expressed support for Israel during their Gaza war. Subsequently, Hermansson posted a message that contained offensive language, stating, "Zionists, fuck off," directed at those who sided with Israel in the conflict. Following widespread media attention, the Swedish edition of Elle distanced themselves from her comments and removed her blog from their website.
