= LaGaylia Frazier =

American-born Swedish singer

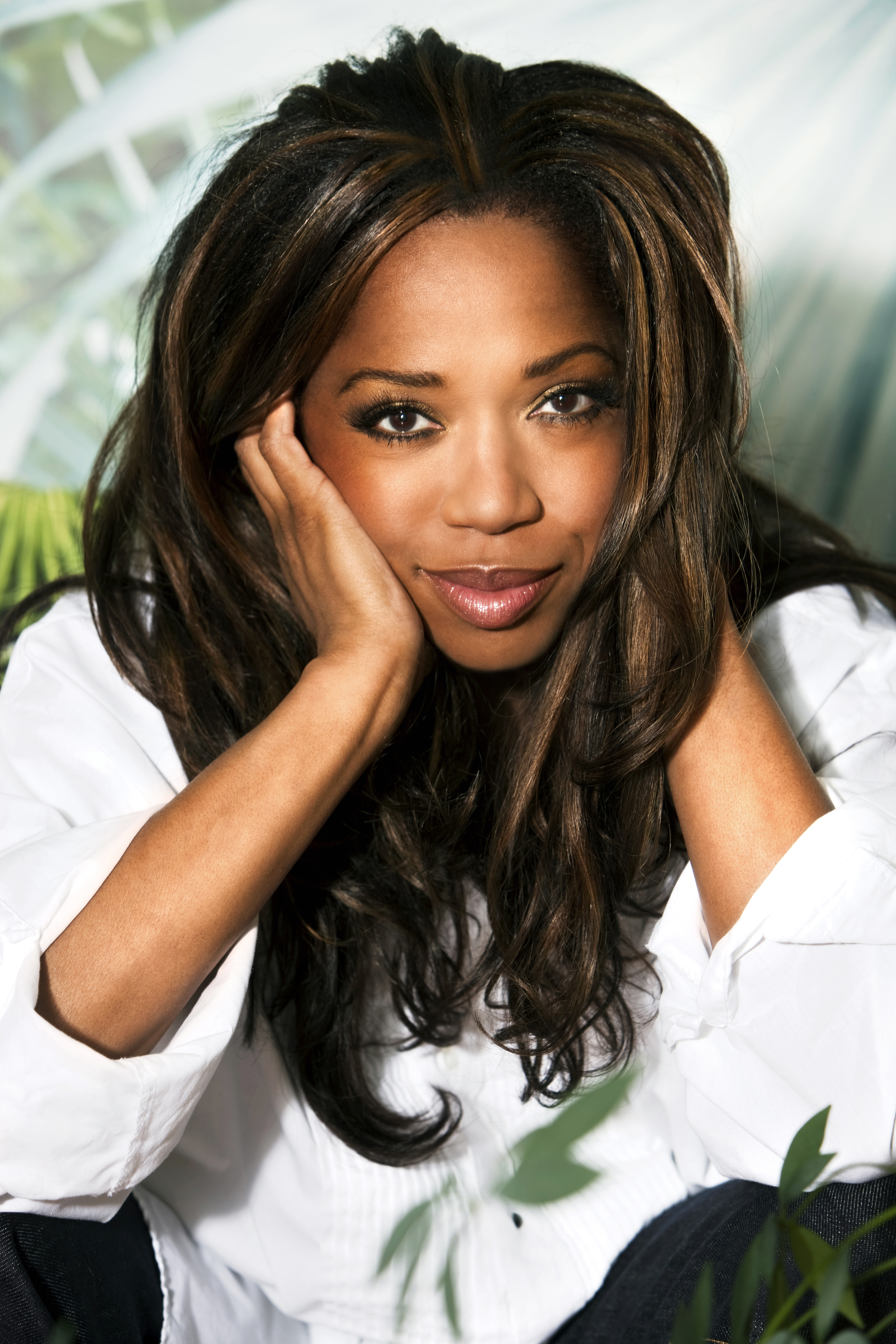
- LaGaylia Frazier

Background information
- Born: 16 February 1961 (age 65); Miami, Florida, USA
- Genres: Jazz, pop
- Occupation: Singer
- Instrument: Vocals

LaGaylia Frazier (born 16 February 1961) is an American-born Swedish singer who specializes in Soul and jazz.

== Early life and work ==
LaGaylia Frazier was born in Miami, Florida. and grew up in Miami Shores. As a child she played classical piano for twelve years. She began singing at the age of 15 and received a full scholarship at the University of Miami where she majored in voice and musical theatre.

After leaving the University of Miami, she performed with Top 40 bands, eventually joining singer Rosco Martinez and pianist Paquito Hechavarriais in a Pop-Latin dance band whose recording debut was as Bandera in 1989. Bandera enjoyed radio support in Florida but were otherwise overlooked despite a European promotional tour by Frazier and her bandmates. After a sabbatical in Britain, Frazier returned to Florida in 1990 and was hired to sing with the house band at the Fort Lauderdale club "the Poorhouse"

. After she was noticed by a manager, Eliot Weisman, she began singing in Atlantic City and Las Vegas.

Frazier sang backup on the song "I Can't Wait Another Minute" (R&B #1, Pop #8) by Hi-Five and on the title song from the album Hold Me, Thrill Me, Kiss Me by Gloria Estefan. In 1994, with Emilio Estefan producing, she recorded the Jon Secada song "Shower Me With Your Love" for the soundtrack to the film The Specialist.

== Career in Sweden ==
While performing at Coconuts in 1999, Frazier was discovered by Marie Schröder, who was visiting the US and became her manager. Frazier went on tour in Scandinavia with the 2000 edition of Rhapsody in Rock by Robert Wells. She moved to Sweden in 2001 where she currently resides. She participated in Rhapsody of Rock tours in 2001, 2002, 2007 and 2011 editions.

Frazier made two bids to represent Sweden in the Eurovision Song Contest: at Melodifestivalen 2004 with "It's in the Stars" and at Melodifestivalen 2005 with "Nothing at All". Both were released by the Lionheart Records M&L label. In 2005, Frazier signed a three-single deal with Lionheart but subsequent to "Nothing at All", which reached No. 38 on the Swedish chart, she had only one single release, "Head in the Clouds" in April 2006. Her album Uncovered was released in 2007 by her label TBG. She wrote nine of the album's ten songs with its producer, Marcus Dernulf.

In 2008, Frazier participated in the Romanian national pre-selection round for Eurovision known as Selecția Națională, performing the song "Dr Frankenstein". She won the Baltic Festival in Karlshamn with her song "Over and Over Again" in July 2008.

In 2003 Frazier performed as Anita in the Malmö Opera and Music Theatre's production of West Side Story. She repeated the role in Stockholm at Stadstheatre in 2015. In 2004, and 2011 she appeared at the Stockholm Jazz Festival. Her 2011 performance in the Festival was joined by her father Hal Frazier. Since 2010 she has collaborated and toured with pianist Jan Lundgren and his trio, performing in the Ystad Jazz Festival again with her father Hal Frazier. At a concert with Lundgren's trio at the Jazz Museum in Strömsholm, she received the Anita O'Day Award in August 2010. Her second album, Until It's Time (2012), was a collaboration with Lundgren. She was also invited to sing at a tribute to Quincy Jones held in Ystad and attended by Quincy Jones himself.

Beginning in 2010, she toured in Sweden in an R&B revue entitled the Blues Mothers with Sahlene. She was a choirmaster in Season #2 of Körslaget (2008-09).

She is one of the jury in Talang 2017, 2018, 2019, and 2020 which is broadcast on TV4. She participated as a celebrity dancer in Let's Dance 2019, which is broadcast on TV4.

== Discography ==
=== Albums ===
Year	Album	Peak positions	Certification	Notes
Year	Album	SWE	Certification	Notes
2007	Uncovered	–		Credited as LaGaylia
2012	Until It's Time	21		Credited as LaGaylia Frazier and Jan Lundgren Trio
2016	LP	–		Credited as LaGaylia
2025	Tina and Me (Live at Rival, Stockholm)	–		Credited as LaGaylia Frazier

=== Singles ===
Year	Single	Peak positions	Notes	Album
Year	Single	SWE	Notes	Album
2004	"It's In The Stars"	–	Credited as LaGaylia Frazier	Melodifestivalen 2004
2005	"Nothing At All"	38	Credited as LaGaylia	Melodifestivalen 2005
2014	"Butter Scream"	2	Credited as LaGaylia with Army of Lovers	
