= Johanna Nordström =

Swedish comedian and television personality (born 1995)

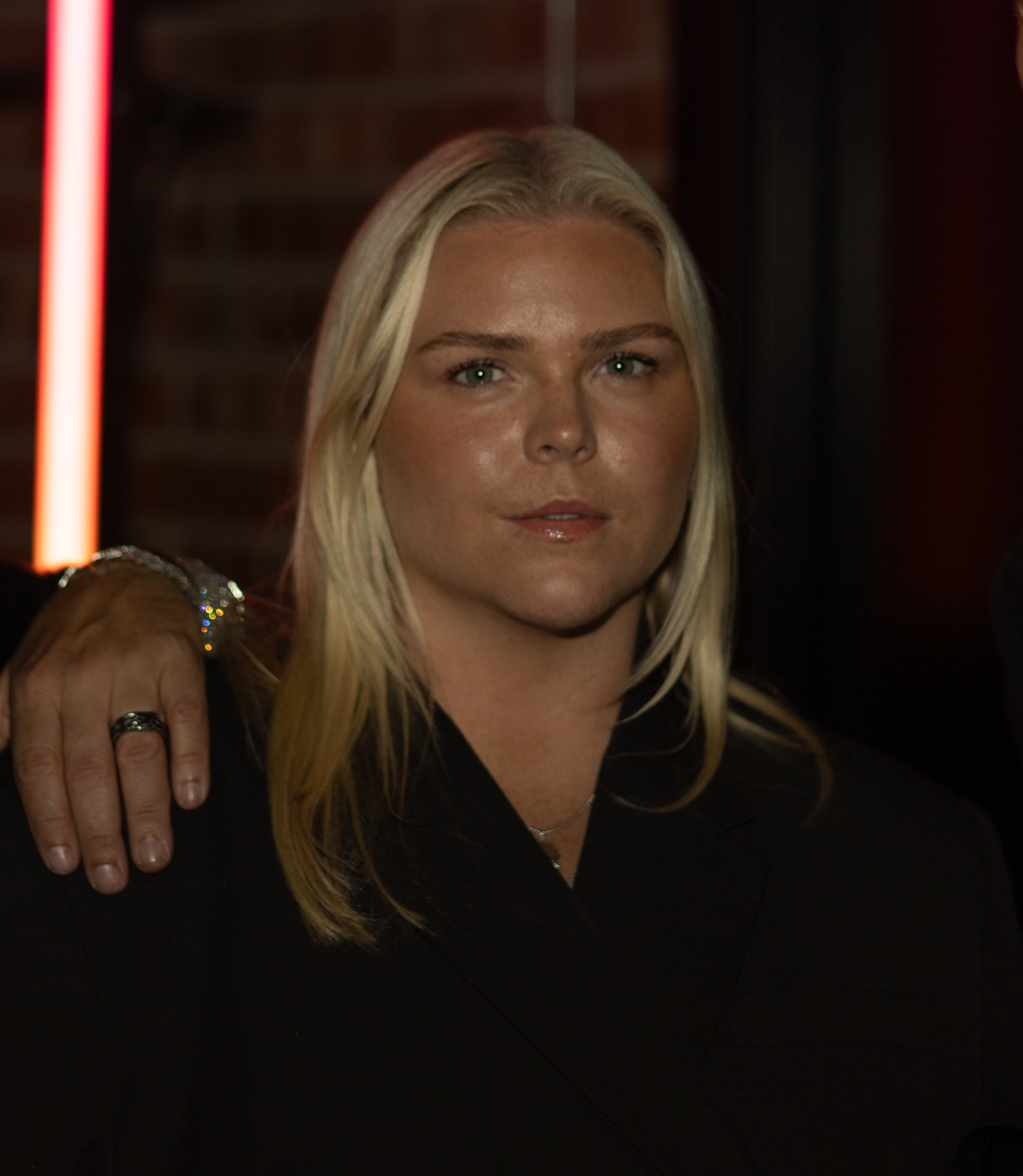
- Nordström in 2025
- Born: Irma Johanna Louise Nordström; 19 November 1995 (age 30); Västerås, Sweden
- Years active: 2013–present
- Children: 1

Irma Johanna Louise Nordström (born 19 November 1995 in Västerås) is a Swedish comedian and television personality. She has participated in Bäst i test on SVT, and Masked Singer Sverige on TV4 and The Traitors (Förrädarna Säsong 1) season 1 in 2023 TV4 Sverige. She has also presented i P3 med Johanna och Torbjörn along with Torbjörn Averås Skorup. She was a jury member in Talang 2023 broadcast on TV4. Nordström presented Let's Dance 2025, the season is broadcast on TV4.
