= David Batra =

Swedish stand up comedian and TV actor

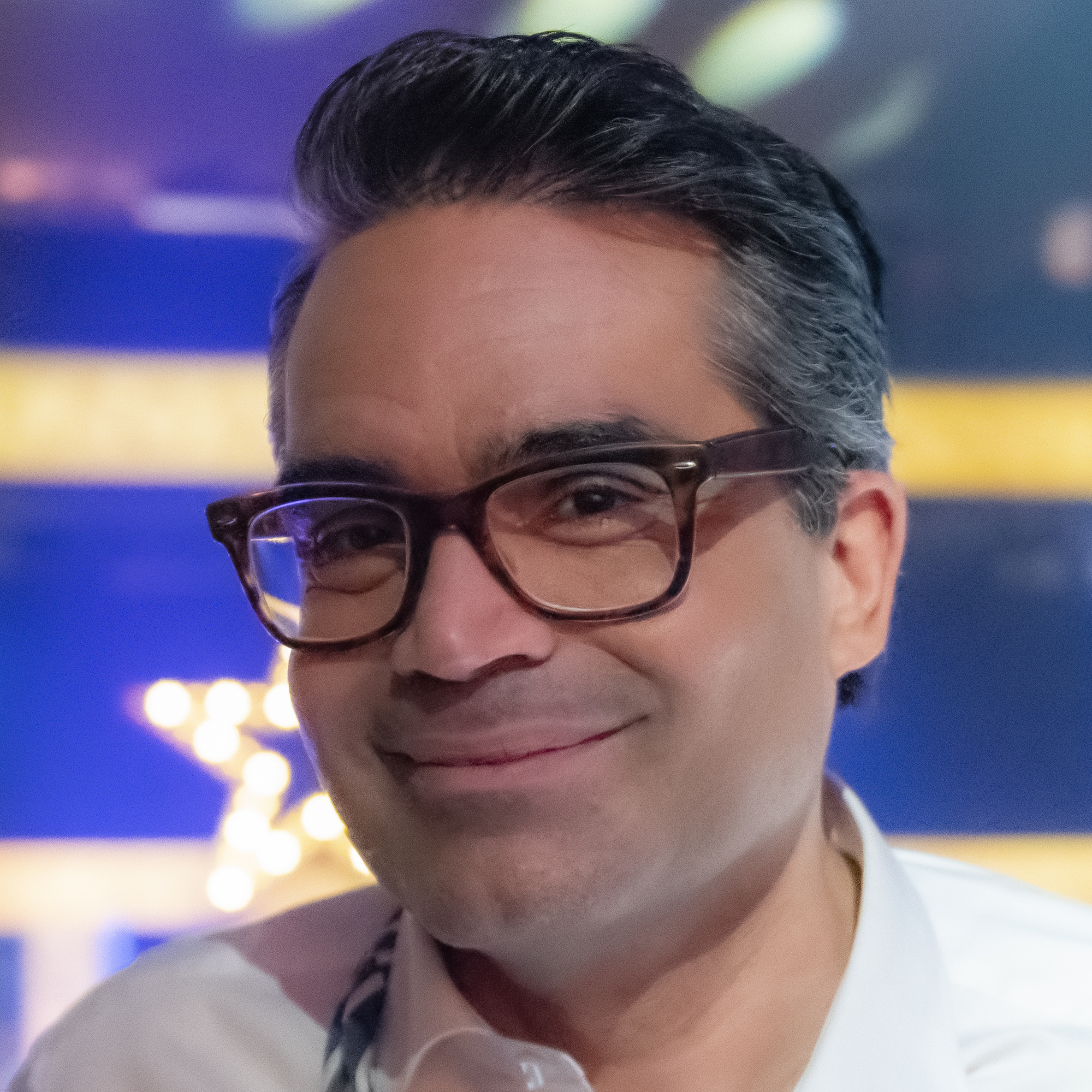
- Batra in 2021.
- Born: David Chandra Batra; 29 November 1972 (age 53); Lund, Sweden
- Occupation: Comedian
- Spouse: Anna Kinberg Batra (m. 24 June 2002)
- Children: 1

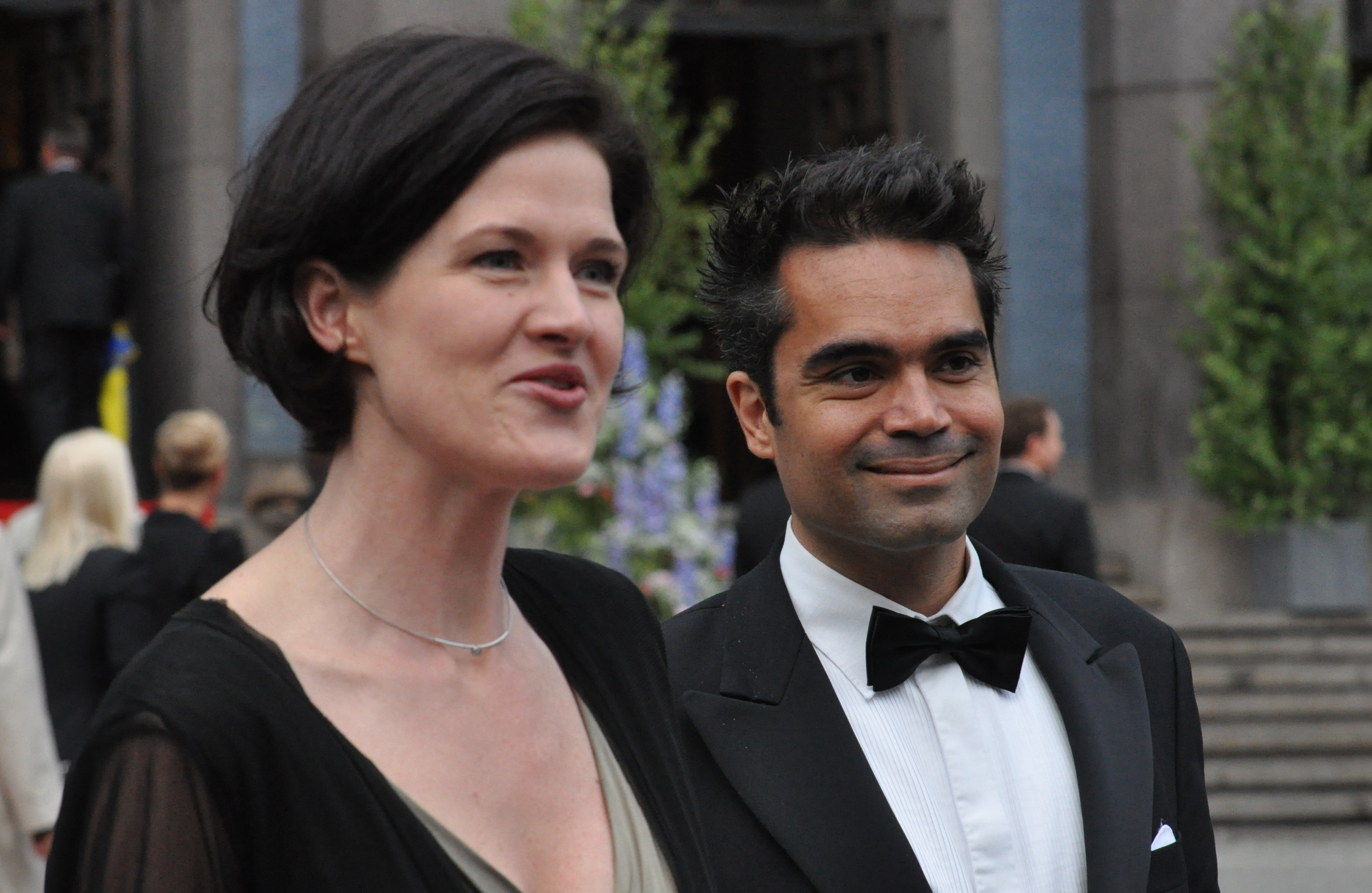
David Batra and his wife Anna, during the June 2010 Wedding of Victoria, Crown Princess of Sweden, and Daniel Westling

David Chandra Batra (born 29 November 1972) is a Swedish stand-up comedian and TV actor. He was born in Lund to an Indian father and a Swedish mother.

Batra started doing stand-up comedy in 1994, and has written and played leading roles in comedy series on Swedish national TV. He has performed not only in Sweden but also in Denmark, Finland, Norway, Russia, Spain and USA. In addition he has appeared on BBC and CNBC. On 25 August 2009, Batra released a music CD containing "irritating and annoying sounds" for people who have the intention of disturbing their neighbors. The disk features loud snores, burps, sex noises and more. In 2009, he made his debut in the TV4 program Parlamentet, and during the autumn/winter of 2009 and 2010, he participated in the comedy program Cirkus Möller in the same channel.

In 2012, Batra replaced Norwegian comedian Calle Hellevang-Larsen as the sidekick on the Norwegian talkshow I kveld med YLVIS. Batra is the author of four books on humor and a cook book. He is married to Swedish politician Anna Kinberg Batra, the former leader of the Moderate Party, Sweden's largest party on the centre-right. Together they have a daughter.

He has served on the jury of the television program Talang since 2017.
