= Pär Lernström =

Swedish broadcaster (born 1980)

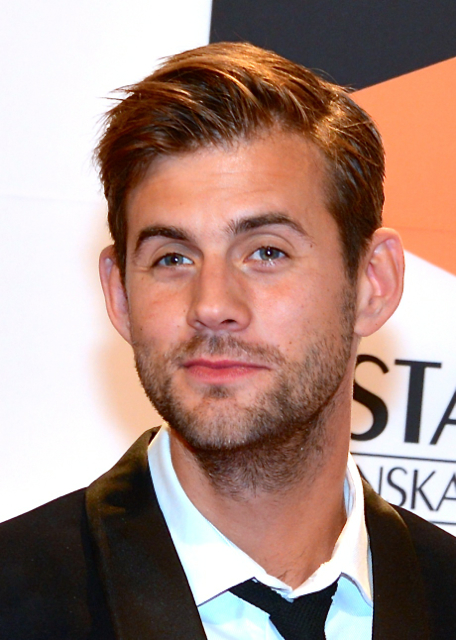
- Lernström in 2013
- Born: Pär Hugo Gustav Lernström; 4 September 1980 (age 45); Eskilstuna, Sweden
- Occupations: Radio & Television Host
- Years active: 2001–present
- Spouse: Linda Öhrn
- Children: 2

Pär Hugo Gustav Lernström, born 4 September 1980, is a Swedish television presenter, perhaps best known for presenting the Swedish Idol series on TV4 since 2011. He also was the main program host for UEFA European championships in Germany 2024 on the Swedish TV network TV4.

He has worked for SR Stockholm, Utbildningsradion, MTV:s morningshow "Mycket mer än müsli", Aftonbladet TV7 and Mix Megapol. Lernström has been TV-host for the Swedish version of Balls of Steel, (Ballar av stål). In 2011 Lernström started to work for TV4. He was TV-host for Parlamentet in 2011. On 1 March 2011 it was reported that Lernström were going to be the TV-host for Swedish Idol 2011, replacing Peter Jihde. He is presenting Talang 2017 which is broadcast on TV4.

In March 2011, he and his wife Linda Öhrn appeared on the TV-show Herr och Fru on TV4. The couple's first child, a daughter, was born in August 2012. He presented Let's Dance 2025 broadcast on TV4.

== Television Host ==
- 2009–2010: Ballar av stål (Balls of Steel)
- 2011: Parlamentet (The Parliament)
- 2011–: Idol Sweden
- 2012–: Kockarnas kamp (Masterchef Sweden)
- 2013: Veckans svensk (Swede of the week)
- 2017–2023: Talang (Got Talent)

== Radio Host ==
- 2009–2011: Afternoon with Pär on Mix Megapol (Eftermiddag med Pär på Mix Megapol)
- 2012–2013: PP3 on Sveriges Radio P3
