= Azerbaijan in the Eurovision Song Contest 2026 =

- Eurovision Song Contest 2026
- Participating broadcaster: İctimai Televiziya (İTV)
- Country: Azerbaijan
- Selection process: Internal selection
- Announcement date: Artist: 6 March 2026; Song: 9 March 2026

Competing entry
- Song: "Just Go"
- Artist: Jiva
- Songwriters: Fuad Javadov; Nurlana Jafarova

Placement
- Semi-final result: Failed to qualify (15th)

Participation chronology

Azerbaijan was represented at the Eurovision Song Contest 2026 with the song "Just Go", written by Fuad Javadov and Nurlana Jafarova, and performed by Jiva. The Azerbaijani participating broadcaster, İctimai Televiziya (İTV), internally selected its entry for the contest.

Azerbaijan was drawn to compete in the second semi-final of the Eurovision Song Contest, which took place on 14 May 2026. Performing during the show in position 2, Azerbaijan was not announced among the top 10 entries of the first semi-final and therefore did not qualify to compete in the final. It was later revealed that Azerbaijan placed last out of the 15 participating countries in the semi-final, with 2 points, marking Azerbaijan's worst result in the contest to date.

== Background ==
Prior to the 2026 contest, İctimai Televiziya (İTV) had participated in the Eurovision Song Contest representing Azerbaijan seventeen times since its first entry in 2008. It had won the contest on one occasion in 2011 with the song "Running Scared" performed by Ell and Nikki. Since its debut in 2008, it had had a string of successful results, qualifying to the final in every contest until in 2018 when it failed to qualify with the song "X My Heart" performed by Aisel. It had placed in the top ten seven times, including a third-place result in 2009 with the song "Always" performed by AySel and Arash, and a second-place result in 2013 with the song "Hold Me" performed by Farid Mammadov. In 2025, it failed to qualify to the final with the song "Run with U" performed by Mamagama.

As part of its duties as participating broadcaster, İTV organises the selection of its entry in the Eurovision Song Contest and broadcasts the event in the country. The broadcaster confirmed its intentions to participate at the 2026 contest on 2 September 2025. İTV had used various methods to select its entry in the past, including internal selections of both the artist and song, as well as national finals to select its artist followed by an internal selection to determine the song. Between 2011 and 2013, İTV organized a national final titled Milli seçim turu to select the performer, song or both for Eurovision. In 2014, the broadcaster utilised an existing talent show format titled Böyük səhnə where the winning performer would subsequently be given an internally selected song. Since 2015, İTV had internally selected both the artist and song, a procedure which was continued for the selection of its 2026 entry.

== Before Eurovision ==
=== Internal selection ===
On 15 December 2025, İTV announced that both the artist and song that would represent Azerbaijan at the Eurovision Song Contest 2026 would be selected internally. Their announcement called for interested artists and songwriters to submit their applications and entries to the broadcaster by 18 January 2026. Songwriters could be of any nationality. 186 submissions were received at the closing of the deadline, 107 of which were from local songwriters. 18 acts were selected to take part in an audition round, from which three proceeded to the final stage based on the decision of a jury panel and a focus group of international music and television industry experts.

On 6 March 2026, İTV announced that Jiva, who won the third season of The Voice of Azerbaijan, would represent Azerbaijan. The song Jiva would be performing, "Just Go", was written by Fuad Javadov and was presented on 9 March via the release of the official music video.

== At Eurovision ==
The Eurovision Song Contest 2026 took place at the Wiener Stadthalle in Vienna, Austria, and consisted of two semi-finals held on the respective dates of 12 and 14 May and the final on 16 May 2026. All nations with the exceptions of the host country and the "Big Four" (France, Germany, Italy and the United Kingdom) were required to qualify from one of two semi-finals in order to compete for the final; the top ten countries from each semi-final progressed to the final. On 12 January 2026, an allocation draw was held to determine which of the two semi-finals, as well as which half of the show, each country will perform in; the European Broadcasting Union (EBU) split up the competing countries into different pots based on voting patterns from previous contests, with countries with favourable voting histories put into the same pot. Azerbaijan was scheduled for the first half of the second semi-final.

On May 14, during the second semi-final it was announced that Azerbaijan failed to qualify for the Grand Final, alongside four other non-qualifying acts.

=== Voting ===
Below is a breakdown of points awarded to Azerbaijan and awarded by Azerbaijan in the second semi-final and grand final of the contest, and the breakdown of the jury voting and televoting conducted during the two shows:

==== Points awarded to Azerbaijan ====
Points awarded to Azerbaijan (Semi-final 2)
Score	Televote	Jury
12 points		
10 points		
8 points		
7 points		
6 points		
5 points		
4 points		
3 points		
2 points		Bulgaria
1 point		

==== Points awarded by Azerbaijan ====
Points awarded by Azerbaijan (Semi-final 2)
Score	Televote	Jury
12 points	Cyprus	Albania
10 points	Bulgaria	Australia
8 points	Switzerland	Ukraine
7 points	Romania	Malta
6 points	Albania	Cyprus
5 points	Malta	Romania
4 points	Czechia	Bulgaria
3 points	Denmark	Latvia
2 points	Ukraine	Denmark
1 point	Latvia	Czechia

Points awarded by Azerbaijan (Final)
Score	Televote	Jury
12 points	Israel	Italy
10 points	Bulgaria	Ukraine
8 points	Finland	Serbia
7 points	Denmark	Croatia
6 points	Romania	Albania
5 points	Australia	Bulgaria
4 points	Ukraine	Israel
3 points	Czechia	Romania
2 points	Malta	Malta
1 point	Moldova	Czechia

==== Detailed voting results ====
Each participating broadcaster assembles a seven-member jury panel consisting of music industry professionals who are citizens of the country they represent and two of which have to be between 18 and 25 years old. Each jury, and individual jury member, is required to meet a strict set of criteria regarding professional background, as well as diversity in gender and age. No member of a national jury was permitted to be related in any way to any of the competing acts in such a way that they cannot vote impartially and independently. The individual rankings of each jury member as well as the nation's televoting results were released shortly after the grand final.

The following members comprised the Azerbaijani jury:

- Azad Faig Shabanov
- Ilkin Sardar Dovlatov (represented Azerbaijan in 2024)
- Vugar Vagif Jamalzade
- Amina Namig Hajiyeva
- Sevinj Nadir Aliyeva
- Tarana Huseyn Muradova
- Medina Sadiyar Ali

Detailed voting results from Azerbaijan (Semi-final 2)
R/O	Country	Jury									Televote	
R/O	Country	Juror A	Juror B	Juror C	Juror D	Juror E	Juror F	Juror G	Rank	Points	Rank	Points
01	Bulgaria	9	10	4	4	14	4	3	7	4	2	10
02	Azerbaijan											
03	Romania	5	5	1	9	12	5	8	6	5	4	7
04	Luxembourg	7	11	7	10	11	10	13	12		12	
05	Czechia	10	7	10	8	5	11	9	10	1	7	4
06	Armenia	14	14	14	13	13	14	14	14		14	
07	Switzerland	12	12	13	14	8	12	11	13		3	8
08	Cyprus	13	13	3	3	6	3	5	5	6	1	12
09	Latvia	2	9	5	7	4	8	12	8	3	10	1
10	Denmark	11	8	12	11	3	6	7	9	2	8	3
11	Australia	8	3	6	1	2	7	2	2	10	11	
12	Ukraine	4	2	8	6	10	1	6	3	8	9	2
13	Albania	3	1	2	2	1	2	1	1	12	5	6
14	Malta	1	4	9	5	9	9	4	4	7	6	5
15	Norway	6	6	11	12	7	13	10	11		13	

Detailed voting results from Azerbaijan (Final)
R/O	Country	Jury									Televote	
R/O	Country	Juror A	Juror B	Juror C	Juror D	Juror E	Juror F	Juror G	Rank	Points	Rank	Points
01	Denmark	15	19	20	5	14	11	19	13		4	7
02	Germany	13	15	25	14	6	15	20	15		22	
03	Israel	7	11	3	4	5	9	5	7	4	1	12
04	Belgium	16	6	24	21	15	21	15	16		23	
05	Albania	3	10	1	9	7	4	9	5	6	12	
06	Greece	24	21	22	23	24	25	12	23		14	
07	Ukraine	2	2	8	3	12	2	1	2	10	7	4
08	Australia	8	12	11	11	11	12	11	11		6	5
09	Serbia	6	3	10	17	2	1	2	3	8	11	
10	Malta	14	7	7	16	9	5	3	9	2	9	2
11	Czechia	9	4	6	18	10	19	13	10	1	8	3
12	Bulgaria	4	8	2	7	3	16	8	6	5	2	10
13	Croatia	5	5	17	1	8	3	7	4	7	20	
14	United Kingdom	18	25	23	24	25	23	25	25		25	
15	France	22	23	19	20	22	22	22	24		17	
16	Moldova	17	20	15	12	13	6	14	14		10	1
17	Finland	20	9	5	13	19	10	21	12		3	8
18	Poland	21	14	13	10	18	14	24	19		16	
19	Lithuania	10	22	9	25	23	13	23	18		19	
20	Sweden	23	18	21	8	17	18	10	17		21	
21	Cyprus	25	17	12	15	16	24	18	20		15	
22	Italy	1	1	14	2	1	8	4	1	12	13	
23	Norway	19	16	18	19	21	17	17	22		18	
24	Romania	11	13	4	6	4	7	6	8	3	5	6
25	Austria	12	24	16	22	20	20	16	21		24	
