= Armenia in the Eurovision Song Contest 2026 =

- Eurovision Song Contest 2026
- Participating broadcaster: Public Television of Armenia (AMPTV)
- Country: Armenia
- Selection process: Internal selection
- Announcement date: 11 March 2026

Competing entry
- Song: "Paloma Rumba"
- Artist: Simón
- Songwriters: David Tserunyan; Eva Voskanyan; Lilit Navasardyan; Roza Kostandyan

Placement
- Semi-final result: Failed to qualify (14th)

Participation chronology

Armenia was represented at the Eurovision Song Contest 2026 with the song "Paloma Rumba", written by David Tserunyan, Eva Voskanyan, Lilit Navasardyan and Roza Kostandyan, and performed by Simón. The Armenian participating broadcaster, Public Television of Armenia (AMPTV), internally selected its entry for the contest.

== Background ==
Prior to the 2026 contest, Public Television of Armenia (AMPTV) had participated in the Eurovision Song Contest representing Armenia seventeen times since its first entry in 2006. Its highest placing in the contest, to this point, had been fourth place, achieved on two occasions: in 2008 with the song "Qélé, Qélé" performed by Sirusho and in 2014 with the song "Not Alone" performed by Aram Mp3. It had also failed to qualify to the final on three occasions, namely in 2011, 2018, and 2019. AMPTV briefly withdrew from the contest on two occasions: in 2012 due to long-standing tensions with then-host country Azerbaijan, and in 2021 due to social and political crises in the aftermath of the Second Nagorno-Karabakh War. In 2025, "Survivor" performed by Parg ultimately placed 20th in the final.

As part of its duties as participating broadcaster, AMPTV organises the selection of its entry in the Eurovision Song Contest and broadcasts the event in the country. It had used various methods to select its entry in the past, such as internal selections and a live televised national final to choose the performer, song or both to compete at Eurovision. In 2017, 2018, 2020 and 2025, the national final Depi Evratesil was organised. AMPTV confirmed its intention to participate in the 2026 contest on 15 December 2025.

== Before Eurovision ==
=== Internal selection ===
On 9 March 2026, Armenian media outlet Hraparak reported that Simon Hovhannisyan had been internally selected to represent the country in the 2026 contest; he had finished runner-up in the 2025 edition of Depi Evratesil with the song "Ay paparey bye". This was confirmed by AMPTV two days later alongside the release of his competing entry, "Paloma Rumba", which was co-written by David Tserunyan, Eva Voskanyan, Lilit Navasardyan and Rosa Linn, the latter of which represented Armenia in 2022.

== At Eurovision ==
The Eurovision Song Contest 2026 took place at the Wiener Stadthalle in Vienna, Austria, and consisted of two semi-finals held on the respective dates of 12 and 14 May and the final on 16 May 2026. All nations with the exceptions of the host country and the "Big Four" (France, Germany, Italy and the United Kingdom) were required to qualify from one of two semi-finals in order to compete for the final; the top ten countries from each semi-final progressed to the final. On 12 January 2026, an allocation draw was held to determine which of the two semi-finals, as well as which half of the show, each country performed in; the European Broadcasting Union (EBU) split up the competing countries into different pots based on voting patterns from previous contests, with countries with favourable voting histories put into the same pot. Armenia was scheduled for the first half of the second semi-final.

=== Voting ===
==== Points awarded to Armenia ====
Points awarded to Armenia (Semi-final 2)
| Score | Televote | Jury |
|---|---|---|
| 12 points | | Australia |
| 10 points | | |
| 8 points | | |
| 7 points | | |
| 6 points | France | |
| 5 points | Bulgaria | |
| 4 points | Australia; Cyprus | Albania; Bulgaria |
| 3 points | | Denmark |
| 2 points | | Norway; United Kingdom |
| 1 point | | France; Latvia; Ukraine |

==== Points awarded by Armenia ====
Points awarded by Armenia (Semi-final 2)
| Score | Televote | Jury |
|---|---|---|
| 12 points | Cyprus | Australia |
| 10 points | Bulgaria | Denmark |
| 8 points | Albania | Bulgaria |
| 7 points | Switzerland | Norway |
| 6 points | Romania | Czechia |
| 5 points | Czechia | Cyprus |
| 4 points | Australia | Romania |
| 3 points | Denmark | Switzerland |
| 2 points | Malta | Malta |
| 1 point | Latvia | Albania |

Points awarded by Armenia (Final)
| Score | Televote | Jury |
|---|---|---|
| 12 points | Bulgaria | Australia |
| 10 points | Australia | Bulgaria |
| 8 points | Finland | France |
| 7 points | Israel | Israel |
| 6 points | Denmark | Norway |
| 5 points | Romania | Denmark |
| 4 points | Greece | Czechia |
| 3 points | Cyprus | Greece |
| 2 points | France | Finland |
| 1 point | Czechia | Poland |

==== Detailed voting results ====
Each participating broadcaster assembles a seven-member jury panel consisting of music industry professionals who are citizens of the country they represent. Each jury, and individual jury member, is required to meet a strict set of criteria regarding professional background, as well as diversity in gender and age. No member of a national jury is permitted to be related in any way to any of the competing acts in such a way that they cannot vote impartially and independently. The individual rankings of each jury member as well as the nation's televoting results were released shortly after the grand final.

The following members comprised the Armenian jury:

- Erik Karapetyan
- Jan Abrahamyan
- Nick Egibyan
- Rudik Ter-Galstyan
- Anahit Adamyan
- Anna Grigoryan
- Naire Stepanyan

Detailed voting results from Armenia (Semi-final 2)
| R/O | Country | Jury | | | | | | | | | Televote | |
| R/O | Country | Juror A | Juror B | Juror C | Juror D | Juror E | Juror F | Juror G | Rank | Points | Rank | Points |
|---|---|---|---|---|---|---|---|---|---|---|---|---|
| 01 | Bulgaria | 3 | 4 | 3 | 5 | 4 | 2 | 5 | 3 | 8 | 2 | 10 |
| 02 | Azerbaijan | 14 | 14 | 14 | 14 | 13 | 13 | 13 | 14 | | 14 | |
| 03 | Romania | 8 | 5 | 5 | 6 | 11 | 8 | 12 | 7 | 4 | 5 | 6 |
| 04 | Luxembourg | 13 | 10 | 13 | 9 | 10 | 10 | 9 | 12 | | 12 | |
| 05 | Czechia | 4 | 6 | 8 | 4 | 2 | 9 | 3 | 5 | 6 | 6 | 5 |
| 06 | Armenia | | | | | | | | | | | |
| 07 | Switzerland | 7 | 7 | 10 | 7 | 14 | 4 | 11 | 8 | 3 | 4 | 7 |
| 08 | Cyprus | 5 | 11 | 11 | 8 | 9 | 5 | 2 | 6 | 5 | 1 | 12 |
| 09 | Latvia | 11 | 13 | 12 | 13 | 5 | 11 | 7 | 11 | | 10 | 1 |
| 10 | Denmark | 6 | 3 | 4 | 2 | 3 | 3 | 4 | 2 | 10 | 8 | 3 |
| 11 | Australia | 1 | 1 | 1 | 1 | 1 | 1 | 1 | 1 | 12 | 7 | 4 |
| 12 | Ukraine | 12 | 12 | 9 | 11 | 6 | 14 | 14 | 13 | | 13 | |
| 13 | Albania | 10 | 8 | 6 | 10 | 12 | 12 | 6 | 10 | 1 | 3 | 8 |
| 14 | Malta | 9 | 9 | 7 | 12 | 7 | 7 | 8 | 9 | 2 | 9 | 2 |
| 15 | Norway | 2 | 2 | 2 | 3 | 8 | 6 | 10 | 4 | 7 | 11 | |

Detailed voting results from Armenia (Final)
| R/O | Country | Jury | | | | | | | | | Televote | |
| R/O | Country | Juror A | Juror B | Juror C | Juror D | Juror E | Juror F | Juror G | Rank | Points | Rank | Points |
|---|---|---|---|---|---|---|---|---|---|---|---|---|
| 01 | Denmark | 6 | 9 | 5 | 6 | 3 | 5 | 7 | 6 | 5 | 5 | 6 |
| 02 | Germany | 7 | 10 | 9 | 21 | 14 | 8 | 14 | 12 | | 19 | |
| 03 | Israel | 13 | 5 | 1 | 8 | 6 | 3 | 8 | 4 | 7 | 4 | 7 |
| 04 | Belgium | 14 | 13 | 10 | 7 | 9 | 10 | 15 | 13 | | 25 | |
| 05 | Albania | 24 | 19 | 11 | 15 | 4 | 19 | 11 | 15 | | 11 | |
| 06 | Greece | 12 | 7 | 14 | 4 | 17 | 2 | 6 | 8 | 3 | 7 | 4 |
| 07 | Ukraine | 16 | 25 | 15 | 12 | 25 | 22 | 16 | 20 | | 13 | |
| 08 | Australia | 2 | 1 | 3 | 1 | 1 | 1 | 1 | 1 | 12 | 2 | 10 |
| 09 | Serbia | 23 | 24 | 25 | 14 | 19 | 21 | 23 | 23 | | 16 | |
| 10 | Malta | 22 | 21 | 17 | 18 | 20 | 18 | 19 | 22 | | 15 | |
| 11 | Czechia | 4 | 15 | 7 | 3 | 11 | 9 | 5 | 7 | 4 | 10 | 1 |
| 12 | Bulgaria | 8 | 2 | 4 | 5 | 2 | 6 | 2 | 2 | 10 | 1 | 12 |
| 13 | Croatia | 17 | 17 | 21 | 19 | 7 | 20 | 17 | 17 | | 17 | |
| 14 | United Kingdom | 25 | 23 | 24 | 25 | 24 | 24 | 25 | 25 | | 24 | |
| 15 | France | 3 | 6 | 2 | 2 | 5 | 7 | 12 | 3 | 8 | 9 | 2 |
| 16 | Moldova | 18 | 12 | 22 | 23 | 23 | 16 | 24 | 21 | | 14 | |
| 17 | Finland | 5 | 14 | 16 | 10 | 12 | 4 | 10 | 9 | 2 | 3 | 8 |
| 18 | Poland | 15 | 3 | 12 | 9 | 16 | 15 | 9 | 10 | 1 | 21 | |
| 19 | Lithuania | 21 | 22 | 23 | 22 | 22 | 25 | 21 | 24 | | 23 | |
| 20 | Sweden | 20 | 16 | 20 | 13 | 21 | 14 | 18 | 18 | | 18 | |
| 21 | Cyprus | 10 | 8 | 8 | 16 | 8 | 12 | 13 | 11 | | 8 | 3 |
| 22 | Italy | 19 | 20 | 19 | 11 | 18 | 17 | 20 | 19 | | 12 | |
| 23 | Norway | 1 | 4 | 6 | 17 | 10 | 11 | 3 | 5 | 6 | 20 | |
| 24 | Romania | 11 | 11 | 13 | 24 | 15 | 23 | 4 | 14 | | 6 | 5 |
| 25 | Austria | 9 | 18 | 18 | 20 | 13 | 13 | 22 | 16 | | 22 | |
