= Bella (Aidan song) =

2026 single by Aidan

Single by Aidan

from the album Cowboys Don't Cry
- Language: English; Maltese; Italian
- Released: 2 January 2026
- Length: 2:57
- Songwriters: Aidan Cassar; Joep van den Boom; Sarah Bonnici

Eurovision Song Contest 2026 entry
- Country: Malta
- Artist: Aidan
- Languages: English; Maltese
- Composers: Aidan Cassar; Joep van den Boom; Sarah Bonnici
- Lyricist: Aidan Cassar

Finals performance
- Semi-final result: 8th
- Semi-final points: 143
- Final result: 18th
- Final points: 89

Entry chronology
- ◄ "Serving" (2025)

"Bella" ("Beautiful") is a song by Maltese singer Aidan. It represented Malta at the Eurovision Song Contest 2026 after winning the Maltese national final, Malta Eurovision Song Contest 2026.

== Eurovision Song Contest ==
=== Malta Eurovision Song Contest 2026 ===
Aidan was announced as one of the participants for Malta Eurovision Song Contest 2026 on 1 December 2025 with his song "Bella". The song was later released to the public on 2 January 2026.

The semi-final for Malta Eurovision Song Contest took place on 16 January, where "Bella" was among the 12 qualifiers for the grand final. The grand final took place on 17 January and after the voting segment, "Bella" received 113 points from the jury vote and 170 points from the televote. After the votes were combined "Bella" placed first, earning Aidan the right to represent Malta at the 2026 Contest.

=== Eurovision 2026 ===
Aidan performed "Bella" in the second half of the second semi-final on 14 May 2026 and qualified for the final. After the Grand Final, it was revealed that he had placed 8th out of 15 countries competing in the semi-final with 143 points (59 from the audience vote and 84 from the international juries).

Aidan performed a repeat of his performance in the grand final on 16 May. The song was performed 10th, after Serbia's Lavina and before Czechia's Daniel Žižka. It placed 18th, receiving 89 points (8 from the public vote and 81 from the juries).

"Bella" marks the first Eurovision entry from Malta in 26 years to feature the Maltese language. The previous use of Maltese was three lines in the 2000 entry "Desire" by Claudette Pace.

== Charts ==
2026 weekly chart performance
Chart (2026)	Peak position
Lithuania (AGATA)	77
Malta Airplay (Radiomonitor)	1
Malta Domestic Airplay (BMAT PRS)	1
UK Singles Sales (OCC)	85
