= Switzerland in the Eurovision Song Contest 2026 =

- Eurovision Song Contest 2026
- Participating broadcaster: Swiss Broadcasting Corporation (SRG SSR)
- Country: Switzerland
- Selection process: Internal selection
- Announcement date: Artist: 20 January 2026; Song: 11 March 2026

Competing entry
- Song: "Alice"
- Artist: Veronica Fusaro
- Songwriters: Charlie McClean; Veronica Fusaro

Placement
- Semi-final result: Failed to qualify (11th)

Participation chronology

Switzerland was represented at the Eurovision Song Contest 2026 with the song "Alice", written by Charlie McClean and Veronica Fusaro, and performed by Fusaro herself. The Swiss participating broadcaster, the Swiss Broadcasting Corporation (SRG SSR), internally selected its entry for the contest.

== Background ==
Prior to the 2026 contest, the Swiss Broadcasting Corporation (SRG SSR) had participated in the Eurovision Song Contest representing Switzerland sixty-five times since its first entry at the inaugural contest in 1956. It won that first edition of the contest with the song "Refrain" performed by Lys Assia. Its second victory was achieved in 1988 with "Ne partez pas sans moi" performed by Canadian singer Céline Dion. Switzerland won the contest for the third time in 2024, with "The Code" performed by Nemo. Since the introduction of semi-finals to the format of the contest in 2004, Switzerland has thus far managed to qualify to the final on ten occasions, five of them being all the contests it participated in since 2019, which included three top five results. As hosts in 2025, Switzerland placed tenth with "Voyage" performed by Zoë Më.

As part of its duties as participating broadcaster, SRG SSR organises the selection of its entry in the Eurovision Song Contest and broadcasts the event in the country. The broadcaster had opted for both national finals and internal selections to select its entries throughout the years, sticking to the internal selection method since 2019. SRG SSR confirmed its intention to participate at the 2026 contest on 2 June 2025, later announcing that it would again use an internal selection to determine its entry.

== Before Eurovision ==
=== Internal selection ===
Between 10 and 12 June 2025, the annual SUISA songwriting camp took place in Maur, Zurich; the songs composed in the event are usually submitted to SRG SSR as potential Eurovision entries.

SRG SSR opened a submission period between 4 and 25 August 2025 for interested artists and composers to submit their entries. Artists and songwriters of any nationality were able to submit songs, with priority given to Swiss nationals or residents. At the closing of the window, 493 entries had been submitted. Submissions were assessed in various rounds by a Swiss public panel, an international public panel, and a 25-member international expert jury; the public panels consisted of Swiss and international audience members, while the international jury consisted of former national jurors for their respective countries at the Eurovision Song Contest. The announcement of the artist took place on 20 January 2026, with Veronica Fusaro, while the song was revealed and released on 11 March; it was "Alice", as Blick had unofficially confirmed shortly before the broadcaster's announcement.

=== Promotion ===
As part of the promotion of her participation in the contest, Fusaro attended the Nordic Eurovision Party in Oslo on 21 March 2026 and the London Eurovision Party on 19 April 2026.

== At Eurovision ==
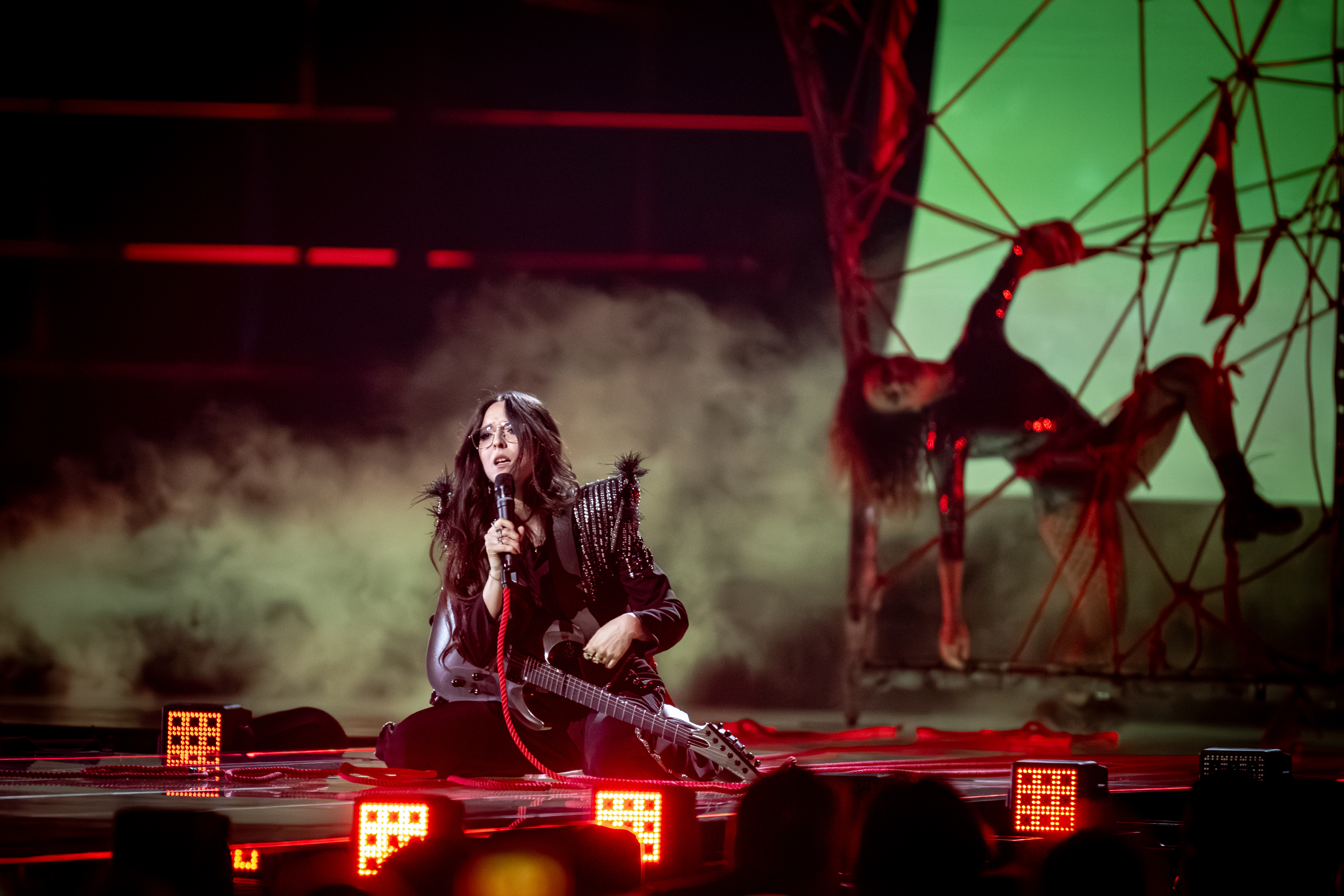
Veronica Fusaro during a rehearsal before the second semi-final.

The Eurovision Song Contest 2026 took place at the Wiener Stadthalle in Vienna, Austria, and consisted of two semi-finals held on the respective dates of 12 and 14 May and the final on 16 May 2026. All nations with the exceptions of the host country and the "Big Four" (France, Germany, Italy and the United Kingdom) were required to qualify from one of two semi-finals in order to compete for the final; the top ten countries from each semi-final progressed to the final. On 12 January 2026, an allocation draw was held to determine which of the two semi-finals, as well as which half of the show, each country performed in; the European Broadcasting Union (EBU) split up the competing countries into different pots based on voting patterns from previous contests, with countries with favourable voting histories put into the same pot. Switzerland was scheduled for the first half of the second semi-final. The shows' producers then decided the running order for the semi-finals; Switzerland was set to perform in position 7.

SRG SSR aired the contest through its subsidiaries across the country:

- French-speaking RTS broadcast the semi-finals on RTS 2 and the final on RTS 1, all with commentary by Victoria Turrian and Nicolas Tanner;
- German-speaking SRF broadcast the semi-finals on SRF zwei and the final on SRF 1, all with commentary by Sven Epiney; additionally, SRF renewed its plans with German broadcaster ARD and Austrian broadcaster ORF to cooperate on the broadcast of Eurovision-themed programmes ESC – Der Countdown and ESC – Die Aftershow for the fourth consecutive year in 2026; the shows are hosted by Barbara Schöneberger;
- Italian-speaking RSI broadcast all shows on RSI La 1, with commentary provided by Ellis Cavallini and Gian-Andrea Costa.

=== Performance ===
Veronica Fusaro took part in technical rehearsals on 4 and 8 May, followed by dress rehearsals on 13 and 14 May. The staging of her performance of "Alice" at the contest is directed by Fredrik Rydman (who has previously done so for a number of entries, most notably Sweden in 2015, Finland in 2023 and Switzerland in 2024) and features a prop consisting of net-like walls and crimson ropes; she was joined on stage by four supporting dancers.

=== Semi-final ===
Switzerland performed in position 7, following the entry from Armenia and before the entry from Cyprus. The country was not announced among the top 10 entries in the semi-final and therefore failed to qualify to compete in the final. It was later revealed that Switzerland placed eleventh in the semi-final with 108 points; 60 points from the public televoting and 48 points from the juries.

=== Voting ===
Below is a breakdown of points awarded by and to Switzerland in the second semi-final and in the final. Voting during the three shows involved each country awarding sets of points from 1-8, 10 and 12: one from their professional jury and the other from televoting. The Swiss jury consisted of Lukas Manuel Hobi, Valentina Londino, Jessana Nemitz, Krishna Panakal, Noemi Schenk, Pierre Smets and Jannik Rouven Till. In the second semi-final, Switzerland placed eleventh with 108 points. Over the course of the contest, Switzerland awarded its 12 points to Czechia (jury) and Bulgaria (televote) in the second semi-final, and to Ukraine (jury) and Israel (televote) in the final.

SRG SSR appointed Livio Chistell as its spokesperson to announce the Swiss jury's points in the final.

==== Points awarded to Switzerland ====
Points awarded to Switzerland (Semi-final 2)
Score	Televote	Jury
12 points		
10 points		
8 points	Azerbaijan; Ukraine	Czechia; Romania; Ukraine
7 points	Armenia; Latvia; Romania	Austria
6 points		
5 points	Australia; Czechia	
4 points	Austria	France
3 points	Rest of the World	Armenia; Australia
2 points	Albania; Cyprus	Cyprus; Latvia
1 point	France; Norway	Bulgaria; Luxembourg; Malta

==== Points awarded by Switzerland ====
Points awarded by Switzerland (Semi-final 2)
Score	Televote	Jury
12 points	Bulgaria	Czechia
10 points	Albania	Ukraine
8 points	Australia	Norway
7 points	Romania	Australia
6 points	Ukraine	Latvia
5 points	Norway	Denmark
4 points	Denmark	Romania
3 points	Luxembourg	Bulgaria
2 points	Cyprus	Malta
1 point	Latvia	Albania

Points awarded by Switzerland (Final)
Score	Televote	Jury
12 points	Israel	Ukraine
10 points	Italy	Czechia
8 points	Bulgaria	Poland
7 points	Albania	France
6 points	Greece	Australia
5 points	Australia	Norway
4 points	Romania	Bulgaria
3 points	Finland	Denmark
2 points	Croatia	Israel
1 point	Moldova	Romania

==== Detailed voting results ====
Each participating broadcaster assembles a seven-member jury panel consisting of music industry professionals who are citizens of the country they represent. Each jury, and individual jury member, is required to meet a strict set of criteria regarding professional background, as well as diversity in gender and age. No member of a national jury was permitted to be related in any way to any of the competing acts in such a way that they cannot vote impartially and independently. The individual rankings of each jury member as well as the nation's televoting results were released shortly after the grand final.

The following members comprised the Swiss jury:

- Lukas Manuel Hobi
- Valentina Londino
- Jessana Nemitz
- Krishna Panakal
- Noemi Schenk
- Pierre Smets
- Jannik Rouven Till

Detailed voting results from Switzerland (Semi-final 2)
R/O	Country	Jury									Televote	
R/O	Country	Juror A	Juror B	Juror C	Juror D	Juror E	Juror F	Juror G	Rank	Points	Rank	Points
01	Bulgaria	9	10	10	14	6	1	6	8	3	1	12
02	Azerbaijan	13	12	11	11	10	14	12	14		14	
03	Romania	6	4	14	3	7	7	4	7	4	4	7
04	Luxembourg	14	14	6	13	14	5	13	13		8	3
05	Czechia	4	1	3	1	2	6	10	1	12	12	
06	Armenia	8	9	13	6	8	12	9	11		13	
07	Switzerland											
08	Cyprus	11	7	7	10	12	11	8	12		9	2
09	Latvia	12	5	5	9	9	3	1	5	6	10	1
10	Denmark	3	8	12	5	4	10	2	6	5	7	4
11	Australia	1	6	2	4	5	13	7	4	7	3	8
12	Ukraine	5	2	4	7	1	2	5	2	10	5	6
13	Albania	7	11	9	8	11	4	11	10	1	2	10
14	Malta	10	13	1	12	13	8	14	9	2	11	
15	Norway	2	3	8	2	3	9	3	3	8	6	5

Detailed voting results from Switzerland (Final)
R/O	Country	Jury									Televote	
R/O	Country	Juror A	Juror B	Juror C	Juror D	Juror E	Juror F	Juror G	Rank	Points	Rank	Points
01	Denmark	9	10	4	9	8	10	6	8	3	17	
02	Germany	19	23	21	17	21	25	11	21		13	
03	Israel	13	16	7	11	11	4	5	9	2	1	12
04	Belgium	18	19	15	18	15	20	16	20		25	
05	Albania	11	6	9	12	10	14	19	14		4	7
06	Greece	16	24	22	22	24	24	21	25		5	6
07	Ukraine	5	1	1	5	1	3	3	1	12	11	
08	Australia	15	12	5	3	5	15	1	5	6	6	5
09	Serbia	21	20	20	15	20	21	25	22		12	
10	Malta	22	13	18	23	23	7	17	17		22	
11	Czechia	3	4	10	1	2	1	10	2	10	21	
12	Bulgaria	24	8	3	8	7	6	12	7	4	3	8
13	Croatia	8	3	16	7	14	16	18	11		9	2
14	United Kingdom	14	22	23	20	22	22	22	23		24	
15	France	1	2	17	2	6	5	13	4	7	14	
16	Moldova	25	18	24	24	17	18	20	24		10	1
17	Finland	12	15	13	21	19	19	7	15		8	3
18	Poland	7	5	2	6	3	2	2	3	8	15	
19	Lithuania	4	25	25	25	25	23	24	16		23	
20	Sweden	23	21	11	19	13	17	15	18		19	
21	Cyprus	17	14	19	16	18	13	23	19		20	
22	Italy	2	17	14	13	16	8	14	12		2	10
23	Norway	10	11	8	4	4	12	4	6	5	18	
24	Romania	6	9	6	10	12	11	8	10	1	7	4
25	Austria	20	7	12	14	9	9	9	13		16	
