= Cyprus in the Eurovision Song Contest 2026 =

- Eurovision Song Contest 2026
- Participating broadcaster: Cyprus Broadcasting Corporation (CyBC)
- Country: Cyprus
- Selection process: Internal selection
- Announcement date: Artist: 6 November 2025; Song: 8 February 2026

Competing entry
- Song: "Jalla"
- Artist: Antigoni
- Songwriters: Antigoni Buxton; Charalambous Kallona; Connor Mullally-Knight; Demetris Nikolaou; Klejdi Lupa; Paris Kalpos; Trey Qua

Placement
- Semi-final result: Qualified (10th, 122 points)
- Final result: 19th, 75 points

Participation chronology

Cyprus was represented at the Eurovision Song Contest 2026 with the song "Jalla", written by Antigoni Buxton, Charalambous Kallona, Connor Mullally-Knight, Demetris Nikolaou, Klejdi Lupa, Paris Kalpos and Trey Qua, and performed by Antigoni herself. The Cypriot participating broadcaster, Cyprus Broadcasting Corporation (CyBC), internally selected its entry for the contest.

== Background ==
Prior to the 2026 contest, the Cyprus Broadcasting Corporation (CyBC) had participated in the Eurovision Song Contest representing Cyprus forty-one times since its debut in the 1981 contest. Its best result in the contest was second, achieved in 2018 with "Fuego" performed by Eleni Foureira. Before that, its best placing was fifth, achieved three times: in 1982 with the song "Mono i agapi" performed by Anna Vissi, in 1997 with "Mana mou" performed by Hara and Andreas Constantinou, and in 2004 with "Stronger Every Minute" performed by Lisa Andreas. Its least successful result was last place, achieved in 1986 with "Tora zo" by Elpida, receiving only four points in total; however, its worst finish in terms of points received was when it placed second to last in 1999 with "Tha'ne erotas" by Marlain Angelidou, receiving only two points. After returning to the contest in 2015 following a one-year absence due to the impact of the 2012–2013 Cypriot financial crisis and the broadcaster's budget restrictions, it has failed to qualify on two occasions, including in 2025, with "Shh" performed by Theo Evan.

As part of its duties as participating broadcaster, CyBC organises the selection of its entry in the Eurovision Song Contest and broadcasts the event in the country. It had used various methods to select its entry in the past, such as internal selections and televised national finals to choose the performer, song or both to compete at Eurovision. Since 2016, the broadcaster had opted to select the entry internally without input from the public.

== Before Eurovision ==
=== Internal selection ===
On 6 November 2025, CyBC announced that British-Cypriot singer Antigoni would represent Cyprus in Vienna. The selection of Antigoni as the Cypriot entrant consisted of two parts: the first involved the votes of a five-member jury panel from nine potential artists proposed by Greek record labels, and the second involved an online questionnaire posted via the broadcaster's website cybc.cy between 30 October and 6 November 2025, during which the public could express their opinion on the artists and its participation in general. Prior to the announcement, it was reported that among the other proposed artists were Evangelia, Giorgos Perris, Good Job Nicky, Josephine, Katerina Stikoudi, Mikay, Nina Mazani and Sophia Patsalides (who represented Cyprus in the 2014 junior contest).

The Cypriot contest song, "Jalla", was written by Antigoni together with Charalambous Kallona, Connor Mullally-Knight, Demetris Nikolaou, Klejdi Lupa, Paris Kalpos and Trey Qua, and was presented to the public on 8 February 2026 during the CyBC evening news broadcast. The official preview video for the song, directed by Bodega Visuals, was released on the same day via the broadcaster's website cybc.cy and the Eurovision Song Contest's official YouTube channel.

=== Promotion ===
To promote "Jalla" before the Eurovision Song Contest 2026, Buxton performed as an interval act at Sing for Greece 2026, the Greek national selection for the Eurovision Song Contest 2026.

== At Eurovision ==
The Eurovision Song Contest 2026 took place at the Wiener Stadthalle in Vienna, Austria, and consisted of two semi-finals held on the respective dates of 12 and 14 May and the final on 16 May 2026. All nations with the exceptions of the host country and the "Big Four" (France, Germany, Italy and the United Kingdom) are required to qualify from one of two semi-finals in order to compete for the final; the top ten countries from each semi-final will progress to the final. On 12 January 2026, an allocation draw was held to determine which of the two semi-finals, as well as which half of the show, each country performed in; the European Broadcasting Union (EBU) split up the competing countries into different pots based on voting patterns from previous contests, with countries with favourable voting histories put into the same pot. Cyprus was scheduled for the second half of the second semi-final.

=== Voting ===
==== Points awarded to Cyprus ====
Points awarded to Cyprus (Semi-Final 2)
Score	Televote	Jury
12 points	Armenia; Azerbaijan	
10 points	Bulgaria	Bulgaria
8 points	Luxembourg; Malta; United Kingdom	Albania; Malta
7 points		
6 points		Azerbaijan
5 points	Rest of the World	Armenia; Norway
4 points	Albania	Australia
3 points	Romania	
2 points	Denmark; Switzerland	
1 point	Australia	Denmark

Points awarded to Cyprus (Final)
Score	Televote	Jury
12 points	Greece	Greece
10 points		Bulgaria
8 points		Georgia
7 points	San Marino	
6 points	Bulgaria	
5 points		
4 points		
3 points	Armenia; Malta; United Kingdom	Australia; Malta; San Marino
2 points		Denmark
1 point		

==== Points awarded by Cyprus ====
Points awarded by Cyprus (Semi-final 2)
Score	Televote	Jury
12 points	Bulgaria	Albania
10 points	Romania	Malta
8 points	Australia	Bulgaria
7 points	Ukraine	Australia
6 points	Malta	Denmark
5 points	Albania	Czechia
4 points	Armenia	Norway
3 points	Norway	Ukraine
2 points	Switzerland	Switzerland
1 point	Luxembourg	Romania

Points awarded by Cyprus (Final)
Score	Televote	Jury
12 points	Greece	Greece
10 points	Bulgaria	Bulgaria
8 points	Israel	Albania
7 points	Romania	Malta
6 points	Moldova	Denmark
5 points	Australia	Australia
4 points	Ukraine	Finland
3 points	Italy	France
2 points	France	Czechia
1 point	Finland	Italy

==== Detailed voting results ====
Each participating broadcaster assembles a seven-member jury panel consisting of music industry professionals who are citizens of the country they represent and two of which have to be between 18 and 25 years old. Each jury, and individual jury member, is required to meet a strict set of criteria regarding professional background, as well as diversity in gender and age. No member of a national jury was permitted to be related in any way to any of the competing acts in such a way that they cannot vote impartially and independently. The individual rankings of each jury member as well as the nation's televoting results were released shortly after the grand final.

The following members comprised the Cypriot jury:

- Giorgis Christodoulou
- Iacovos Kedaritis
- Marinos Consolos
- Andria Zanti
- Elena Antonopoulou
- Ntora Makrigianni

Detailed voting results from Cyprus (Semi-final 2)
R/O	Country	Jury								Televote	
R/O	Country	Juror A	Juror B	Juror C	Juror D	Juror E	Juror F	Rank	Points	Rank	Points
01	Bulgaria	3	3	2	1	1	6	3	8	1	12
02	Azerbaijan	10	13	9	8	10	13	11		14	
03	Romania	13	14	10	10	6	5	10	1	2	10
04	Luxembourg	8	10	11	13	14	14	14		10	1
05	Czechia	4	9	12	6	8	3	6	5	11	
06	Armenia	14	7	13	12	11	9	12		7	4
07	Switzerland	11	6	7	11	12	7	9	2	9	2
08	Cyprus										
09	Latvia	12	8	8	14	13	11	13		13	
10	Denmark	5	12	5	5	4	8	5	6	12	
11	Australia	6	4	4	4	5	10	4	7	3	8
12	Ukraine	9	5	6	7	7	12	8	3	4	7
13	Albania	1	1	3	3	2	2	1	12	6	5
14	Malta	2	2	1	2	3	4	2	10	5	6
15	Norway	7	11	14	9	9	1	7	4	8	3

Detailed voting results from Cyprus (Final)
R/O	Country	Jury								Televote	
R/O	Country	Juror A	Juror B	Juror C	Juror D	Juror E	Juror F	Rank	Points	Rank	Points
01	Denmark	6	6	6	10	3	3	5	6	14	
02	Germany	16	13	18	18	4	5	11		21	
03	Israel	10	24	24	8	15	8	14		3	8
04	Belgium	20	21	10	19	20	17	21		23	
05	Albania	7	5	7	2	5	4	3	8	11	
06	Greece	1	1	1	1	1	1	1	12	1	12
07	Ukraine	11	16	17	20	18	18	19		7	4
08	Australia	3	8	3	5	9	13	6	5	6	5
09	Serbia	24	22	21	24	17	20	23		13	
10	Malta	4	11	4	3	2	11	4	7	15	
11	Czechia	18	18	20	9	10	2	9	2	18	
12	Bulgaria	5	2	2	4	8	6	2	10	2	10
13	Croatia	12	15	22	7	23	21	16		16	
14	United Kingdom	23	23	23	23	24	22	24		22	
15	France	9	7	5	6	7	9	8	3	9	2
16	Moldova	21	10	13	21	22	23	18		5	6
17	Finland	2	4	8	17	11	14	7	4	10	1
18	Poland	17	19	14	14	19	16	20		12	
19	Lithuania	19	20	19	22	21	24	22		20	
20	Sweden	15	9	11	16	6	15	12		17	
21	Cyprus										
22	Italy	8	3	12	11	16	19	10	1	8	3
23	Norway	13	14	9	13	14	7	13		19	
24	Romania	14	12	16	12	13	10	15		4	7
25	Austria	22	17	15	15	12	12	17		24	
