= Malta in the Eurovision Song Contest 2026 =

- Eurovision Song Contest 2026
- Participating broadcaster: Public Broadcasting Services (PBS)
- Country: Malta
- Selection process: Malta Eurovision Song Contest 2026
- Selection date: 17 January 2026

Competing entry
- Song: "Bella"
- Artist: Aidan
- Songwriters: Aidan Cassar; Joep van den Boom; Sarah Bonnici

Placement
- Semi-final result: Qualified (8th, 143 points)
- Final result: 18th, 89 points

Participation chronology

Malta was represented at the Eurovision Song Contest 2026 with the song "Bella", written by Aidan Cassar, Joep van den Boom and Sarah Bonnici, and performed by Aidan himself. The Maltese participating broadcaster, Public Broadcasting Services (PBS), organised the national final Malta Eurovision Song Contest 2026 to select its entry for the contest.

== Background ==
Prior to the 2026 contest, the Maltese Broadcasting Authority (MBA) until 1975, and the Public Broadcasting Services (PBS) since 1991, have participated in the Eurovision Song Contest representing Malta thirty-seven times since MBA's first entry in 1971. MBA briefly competed in the contest in the 1970s before withdrawing for sixteen years, while PBS competed in every contest since their return in 1991. Their best placing in the contest so far is second, which it achieved on two occasions; 2002 with the song "7th Wonder" performed by Ira Losco, and in 2005 with the song "Angel" performed by Chiara. In 2025, "Serving" performed by Miriana Conte qualified to the final and placed 17th.

As part of its duties as participating broadcaster, PBS organises the selection of its entry in the Eurovision Song Contest and broadcasts the event in the country. The broadcaster confirmed its intentions to participate at the 2026 contest on 29 May 2025. Since 2022, PBS has selected its entry through a national final procedure called Malta Eurovision Song Contest (MESC), a method that will be continued for its 2026 participation.

== Before Eurovision ==
=== Malta Eurovision Song Contest 2026 ===
Malta Eurovision Song Contest 2026 was the national final format developed by PBS to select its entry for the Eurovision Song Contest 2026. The competition consisted of a semi-final and final held on 15 and 17 January 2026, respectively, at the Malta Fairs and Conventions Centre in Ta' Qali. Both shows were hosted by Keane Cutajar, Destiny Chukunyere (who won Junior Eurovision 2015 and represented Malta in Eurovision 2021) and Gaia Cauchi (who won Junior Eurovision 2013). The competition was broadcast live on TVM as well as on TVM+ with Maltese sign language interpretation and lyrics, as well as on the broadcaster's streaming service TVMi. The final was also broadcast on the official Eurovision Song Contest YouTube channel.

==== Format ====
The competition consisted of eighteen songs competing in the semi-final on 15 January 2026 where the top twelve entries qualified to compete in the final on 17 January 2026. Ten judges and the public via televoting evaluated the songs during the shows, both of which had an equal stake (50%) in the final result. Ties in the final results were broken based on the entry which received the higher score from the public. The ten members of the jury that evaluated the entries during the semi-final and final consisted of:

- Kevin Abela (Malta) – Orchestrator, arranger and director
- Andreas Anastasiou (Cyprus) – International relations officer of the Cyprus Broadcasting Corporation (CyBC)
- Joseph Chetcuti (Malta) – Television producer, musician and lawyer
- Russell Davies (United Kingdom) – Organiser of the London Eurovision Party
- Ramona Depares (Malta) – Journalist and cultural critic
- Elaine Falzon (Malta) – Cultural manager
- Felix Häring (Germany) – Member of OGAE Germany
- Ersin Parlak (Turkey) – Assistant of the Sammarinese delegation at the Eurovision Song Contest
- Ozzy Lino (Malta) – Singer-songwriter
- Alexia Souferi (Greece) – International television and media executive at Antenna Group

==== Competing entries ====
Artists and composers were able to submit their entries to the broadcaster between 17 and 23 November 2025. Songwriters from any nationality were able to submit songs as long as the artist (at least half of the lead vocalists for groups or duos) and one of the songwriters per entry were Maltese or possessed Maltese citizenship. A songwriting camp called the MESC Music Exchange Camp was held between 15 and 24 June 2025 in order to create songs to be submitted for the competition, with up to 80 songs eventually created in the camp. 18 semi-finalist entries were selected and announced during a special programme aired on TVM, hosted by Daniel Testa (who represented Malta in Junior Eurovision 2008) and Ylenia Spiteri, on 1 December 2025.

Artist	Song	Songwriters
Adria Twins	"Nerġa' nqum"	Joe Julian Farrugia; Shaun Farrugia
Aidan	"Bella"	Aidan Cassar; Joep van den Boom; Sarah Bonnici
Chess Galea	"Shout It Out"	Chess Galea; Hannah Dorman; Niklas Rosström; Remy Borsboom
Denise	"Trophy"	Denise Mercieca; Linnea Deb; Marcus Winther-John; Owen Vos
Ema	"Achikuku (Don't Think About It)"	Ema Vella; Emil Calleja Bayliss; Matthew Caruana; Peter Borg
Franklin Calleja	"Guide You Home"	Cyprian Cassar; Franklin Calleja
Janice Mangion	"Univers"	Cyprian Cassar; Emil Calleja Bayliss; Mark Scicluna
Kelsie Borg	"Let a Girl Breathe"	Gusten Dahlqvist; Jean Paul Borg; Linnea Gawell
Kelsy Attard	"Perfectly Broken"	Kelsey Attard; Melanie Wehbe; Rasmus Rex Wester Findinge; Sarah Bonnici
Kurt Anthony	"On the Borderline"	Edward Abela; Joe Romano; Kelly Rose Moncado
Liston	"Mela"	Daniel Borg; Liston Bongailas
Mark Anthony Bartolo	"Mumenti sbieħ"	Mark Anthony Bartolo; Matthew Caruana; Ronald Janeček; Silje Montsko Blandkjenn
Matt Blxck	"Ejja lejja ħdejja 'l hawn (The Flute)"	Audun Agnar Guldbrandsen; Matthew Caruana; Matthew James Borg
Matthew Cilia and the AfterParty	"Brutality Mentality"	Daniel Dalli; David Depasquale; Joshua Max Wunderlich; Linnea Gawell; Matthew Cilia
Mychael Bartolo Chircop	"My Sweet Angel"	Klinsmann Coleiro; Matthew Caruana; Mychael Bartolo Chircop; Remy Borsboom
Nathan Psaila	"Ganador"	Nathan Psaila; Tchiah Ommar; Tobi Verheij; Ynke Dingenen
Rhiannon Micallef	"Hold Myself Up"	Kaya Campbell; Natalie Misova; Noah Timman; Rhiannon Micallef
Stefan Galea	"Pose"	Owen Vos; Stefan Galea; Tchiah Ommar; Ynke Dingenen

==== Semi-final ====
The semi-final took place on 15 January 2026. Eighteen songs competed for twelve qualifying spots in the final. The running order was announced on 13 January 2026. The interval act of the show featured performances by Gaia Cauchi, Tommy Cash, who represented Estonia in 2025, the Mużika Mużika 2025 winner Jamie Cardona, and musician Ivan Grech.

Semi-final – 15 January 2026
R/O	Artist	Song	Result
1	Aidan	"Bella"	Qualified
2	Ema	"Achikuku (Don't Think About It)"	Qualified
3	Chess Galea	"Shout It Out"	—N/a
4	Liston	"Mela"	—N/a
5	Franklin Calleja	"Guide You Home"	Qualified
6	Kelsy Attard	"Perfectly Broken"	—N/a
7	Matthew Cilia and the AfterParty	"Brutality Mentality"	Qualified
8	Mark Anthony Bartolo	"Mumenti sbieħ"	Qualified
9	Denise	"Trophy"	Qualified
10	Kurt Anthony	"On the Borderline"	—N/a
11	Rhiannon Micallef	"Hold Myself Up"	—N/a
12	Stefan Galea	"Pose"	—N/a
13	Matt Blxck	"Ejja lejja ħdejja 'l hawn (The Flute)"	Qualified
14	Adria Twins	"Nerġa' nqum"	Qualified
15	Kelsie Borg	"Let a Girl Breathe"	Qualified
16	Mychael Bartolo Chircop	"My Sweet Angel"	Qualified
17	Janice Mangion	"Univers"	Qualified
18	Nathan Psaila	"Ganador"	Qualified

==== Final ====
The final took place on 17 January 2026. The twelve entries that qualified from the semi-final were performed again and the 50/50 combination of votes of a ten-member jury panel and the results of public televoting determined the winner. The interval act of the show featured performances by co-host Destiny Chukunyere, Eliza Borg (who represented Malta in Junior Eurovision 2025), Baby Lasagna (who represented Croatia in 2024), Miriana Conte (who represented Malta in 2025) and the band Scream Daisy. After the votes from the jury panel and televote were combined, "Bella" performed by Aidan was the winner.

Final – 17 January 2026
R/O	Artist	Song	Jury	Televote	Total	Place
1	Janice Mangion	"Univers"	23	11	34	10
2	Kelsie Borg	"Let a Girl Breathe"	14	17	31	11
3	Matt Blxck	"Ejja lejja ħdejja 'l hawn (The Flute)"	68	200	268	2
4	Denise	"Trophy"	45	26	71	6
5	Nathan Psaila	"Ganador"	15	23	38	9
6	Ema	"Achikuku (Don't Think About It)"	52	12	64	7
7	Franklin Calleja	"Guide You Home"	31	12	43	8
8	Mychael Bartolo Chircop	"My Sweet Angel"	67	69	136	3
9	Mark Anthony Bartolo	"Mumenti sbieħ"	75	12	87	4
10	Aidan	"Bella"	113	170	283	1
11	Matthew Cilia and the AfterParty	"Brutality Mentality"	70	14	84	5
12	Adria Twins	"Nerġa' nqum"	7	14	21	12

Detailed jury votes
R/O	Song	K. Abela	A. Anastasiou	J. Chetcuti	R. Davies	R. Depares	E. Falzon	F. Häring	E. Parlak	O. Lino	A. Souferi	Total
1	"Univers"	2	2	1	3	4	3	6		2		23
2	"Let a Girl Breathe"					2		4		6	2	14
3	"Ejja lejja ħdejja 'l hawn (The Flute)"	4	7	8	7	8	8	12	5	3	6	68
4	"Trophy"	5	5	4	4	5	4	10	1	4	3	45
5	"Ganador"	3	1	2	1				2	1	5	15
6	"Achikuku (Don’t Think About It)"	6	3	3	8	3	5	7	8	8	1	52
7	"Guide You Home"	1	4	5	6	1	1	2	7		4	31
8	"My Sweet Angel"	8	6	10	2	7	10	3	6	5	10	67
9	"Mumenti sbieħ"	10	10	6	10	6	6		10	10	7	75
10	"Bella"	12	12	12	12	12	12	5	12	12	12	113
11	"Brutality Mentality"	7	8	7	5	10	7	8	3	7	8	70
12	"Nerġa' nqum"						2	1	4			7

==== Ratings ====
Viewing figures by show
Show	Date	Viewership	Share (%)
Semi-final	15 January 2026	185,000	85%
Final	17 January 2026	275,000	90%

=== Promotion ===
To promote his entry, Aidan went on a promotional tour of Europe. He performed in various Eurovision 2026-related events including the Lithuanian national final, the Melodifestivalen final pre-party (the Swedish national final) and more.

== At Eurovision ==
The Eurovision Song Contest 2026 took place at the Wiener Stadthalle in Vienna, Austria, and consisted of two semi-finals held on the respective dates of 12 and 14 May and the final on 16 May 2026. All nations with the exceptions of the host country and the "Big Four" (France, Germany, Italy and the United Kingdom) were required to qualify from one of two semi-finals in order to compete for the final; the top ten countries from each semi-final progressed to the final. On 12 January 2026, an allocation draw was held to determine which of the two semi-finals, as well as which half of the show, each country performed in; the European Broadcasting Union (EBU) split up the competing countries into different pots based on voting patterns from previous contests, with countries with favourable voting histories put into the same pot. Malta was scheduled for the second half of the second semi-final.

=== Voting ===
==== Points awarded to Malta ====
Points awarded to Malta (Semi-final 2)
Score	Televote	Jury
12 points		Albania; Bulgaria; Ukraine
10 points		Cyprus
8 points		
7 points	Bulgaria	Azerbaijan
6 points	Albania; Australia; Cyprus	Denmark; Luxembourg
5 points	Azerbaijan; France	France
4 points	Luxembourg; Norway	Austria
3 points	Latvia	
2 points	Armenia; Austria; Czechia; Romania; Ukraine; United Kingdom	Armenia; Czechia; Switzerland
1 point	Denmark	Australia; Norway; Romania; United Kingdom

Points awarded to Malta (Final)
Score	Televote	Jury
12 points		Bulgaria; San Marino; Ukraine
10 points		
8 points		Italy; Serbia
7 points		Cyprus
6 points		Albania
5 points		
4 points	Australia	Georgia
3 points		France; Romania
2 points	Azerbaijan; Bulgaria	Azerbaijan; Luxembourg
1 point		Czechia; United Kingdom

==== Points awarded by Malta ====
Points awarded by Malta (Semi-final 2)
Score	Televote	Jury
12 points	Bulgaria	Australia
10 points	Australia	Bulgaria
8 points	Cyprus	Cyprus
7 points	Albania	Romania
6 points	Norway	Denmark
5 points	Romania	Albania
4 points	Luxembourg	Ukraine
3 points	Denmark	Norway
2 points	Ukraine	Czechia
1 point	Latvia	Switzerland

Points awarded by Malta (Final)
Score	Televote	Jury
12 points	Italy	Bulgaria
10 points	Australia	Italy
8 points	Bulgaria	Australia
7 points	Israel	France
6 points	Albania	Albania
5 points	Romania	Finland
4 points	Finland	Israel
3 points	Cyprus	Cyprus
2 points	Greece	Norway
1 point	Serbia	Poland

==== Detailed voting results ====
Each participating broadcaster assembles a seven-member jury panel consisting of music industry professionals who are citizens of the country they represent and two of which have to be between 18 and 25 years old. Each jury, and individual jury member, is required to meet a strict set of criteria regarding professional background, as well as diversity in gender and age. No member of a national jury was permitted to be related in any way to any of the competing acts in such a way that they cannot vote impartially and independently. The individual rankings of each jury member as well as the nation's televoting results were released shortly after the grand final.

The following members comprised the Maltese jury:

- Kevin Abela
- Mychael Bartolo Chircop
- Sigmund Mifsud
- Stephen Mintoff
- Andrea Frendo
- Julia Cassar
- Giselle Calleja

Detailed voting results from Malta (Semi-final 2)
R/O	Country	Jury								Televote	
R/O	Country	Juror A	Juror B	Juror C	Juror D	Juror E	Juror F	Rank	Points	Rank	Points
01	Bulgaria	1	9	3	2	1	6	2	10	1	12
02	Azerbaijan	11	8	14	10	10	5	12		13	
03	Romania	3	3	4	5	6	11	4	7	6	5
04	Luxembourg	13	10	9	11	12	9	13		7	4
05	Czechia	8	7	12	6	4	10	9	2	12	
06	Armenia	7	11	13	13	14	12	14		14	
07	Switzerland	6	12	11	14	8	3	10	1	11	
08	Cyprus	2	4	7	3	2	8	3	8	3	8
09	Latvia	12	13	6	7	7	14	11		10	1
10	Denmark	5	14	2	8	3	7	5	6	8	3
11	Australia	9	1	1	1	5	2	1	12	2	10
12	Ukraine	10	2	8	12	13	4	7	4	9	2
13	Albania	4	5	5	4	9	13	6	5	4	7
14	Malta										
15	Norway	14	6	10	9	11	1	8	3	5	6

Detailed voting results from Malta (Final)
R/O	Country	Jury								Televote	
R/O	Country	Juror A	Juror B	Juror C	Juror D	Juror E	Juror F	Rank	Points	Rank	Points
01	Denmark	18	13	15	14	9	7	12		12	
02	Germany	8	12	16	13	14	17	13		21	
03	Israel	2	7	7	5	10	9	7	4	4	7
04	Belgium	12	17	14	10	21	15	15		20	
05	Albania	7	3	3	15	4	4	5	6	5	6
06	Greece	23	15	13	22	22	19	23		9	2
07	Ukraine	13	18	17	16	18	10	17		13	
08	Australia	6	4	4	6	3	1	3	8	2	10
09	Serbia	22	14	5	23	20	24	14		10	1
10	Malta										
11	Czechia	14	20	18	17	8	20	16		22	
12	Bulgaria	1	1	1	7	1	2	1	12	3	8
13	Croatia	15	16	19	20	19	12	22		19	
14	United Kingdom	24	24	24	24	24	22	24		18	
15	France	4	6	6	1	7	8	4	7	11	
16	Moldova	19	11	10	18	23	23	19		16	
17	Finland	11	10	20	2	5	3	6	5	7	4
18	Poland	10	8	22	8	13	13	10	1	14	
19	Lithuania	9	23	21	21	16	21	21		23	
20	Sweden	20	21	8	19	17	16	18		17	
21	Cyprus	5	5	23	9	6	6	8	3	8	3
22	Italy	3	2	2	4	2	5	2	10	1	12
23	Norway	16	19	9	3	12	14	9	2	15	
24	Romania	17	9	11	12	11	11	11		6	5
25	Austria	21	22	12	11	15	18	20		24	
