= Australia in the Eurovision Song Contest 2026 =

- Eurovision Song Contest 2026
- Participating broadcaster: Special Broadcasting Service (SBS)
- Country: Australia
- Selection process: Internal selection
- Announcement date: 1 March 2026

Competing entry
- Song: "Eclipse"
- Artist: Delta Goodrem
- Songwriters: Delta Goodrem; Ferras Alqaisi; Jonas Myrin; Michael Fatkin

Placement
- Semi-final result: Qualified (3rd, 222 points)
- Final result: 4th, 287 points

Participation chronology

Australia was represented at the Eurovision Song Contest 2026 with the song "Eclipse", written by Delta Goodrem, Ferras Alqaisi, Jonas Myrin and Michael Fatkin, and performed by Goodrem herself. The Australian participating broadcaster, the Special Broadcasting Service (SBS), internally selected its entry for the contest.

Australia came 4th place with a score of 287 points, their 2nd best score in the contest, and Australia's best score since Dami Im finished 2nd at the Eurovision 2016.

== Background ==
The Special Broadcasting Service (SBS) had broadcast the Eurovision Song Contest in Australia since 1983, and the contest had gained a cult following over that time, primarily due to the country's strong political and cultural ties with Europe. Paying tribute to this, the 2014 semi-finals included an interval act featuring Australian singer Jessica Mauboy. Australian singers had also participated at Eurovision representing other countries, including Olivia Newton-John (United Kingdom 1974), two-time winner Johnny Logan (Ireland 1980 and 1987), Gina G (United Kingdom 1996), and Jane Comerford as lead singer of Texas Lightning (Germany 2006).

The European Broadcasting Union (EBU) invited SBS to participate in the contest representing Australia for the first time in 2015, as a guest participant to celebrate the 60th edition of the event, being granted automatic entry into the final along with the "Big Five" (France, Germany, Italy, Spain, and the United Kingdom) and the host country (Austria). It had since competed in every edition of the contest, i.e. nine times, being required to qualify from its semi-final since 2016. In 2025, it entered the song "Milkshake Man" by Go-Jo, which failed to qualify for the final, ending in 11th place in the second semi-final with 41 points.

== Before Eurovision ==
=== Internal selection ===
On 26 February 2026, the EBU announced through an Instagram post that SBS had internally selected the Australian entrant and entry for the contest and that they would be revealed on 1 March. The entrant was announced to be Delta Goodrem with the song "Eclipse".

== At Eurovision ==
The Eurovision Song Contest 2026 took place at the Wiener Stadthalle in Vienna, Austria, and consisted of two semi-finals held on the respective dates of 12 and 14 May and the final on 16 May 2026. All nations with the exceptions of the host country and the "Big Four" (France, Germany, Italy and the United Kingdom) were required to qualify from one of two semi-finals in order to compete for the final; the top ten countries from each semi-final progressed to the final. On 12 January 2026, an allocation draw was held to determine which of the two semi-finals, as well as which half of the show, each country performed in; the European Broadcasting Union (EBU) split up the competing countries into different pots based on voting patterns from previous contests, with countries with favourable voting histories put into the same pot. Australia was scheduled for the second half of the second semi-final.

On the 14th of May 2026, Australia was announced as a qualifier to the Grand Final.

She performed 8th and came 4th place after coming tied 2nd place in juries with Denmark with 165 points, behind Bulgaria with 204 points. Australia earned 122 points from the international televote, finishing 4th with 287 points, ahead of Sal Da Vinci’s “Per Sempre Sì” for Italy and behind Alexandra Căpitănescu’s “Choke Me” for Romania.

=== Voting ===
==== Points awarded to Australia ====
Points awarded to Australia (Semi-Final 2)
Score	Televote	Jury
12 points		Armenia; Malta
10 points	Malta	Austria; Azerbaijan; Denmark; Luxembourg; Norway; Romania
8 points	Austria; Cyprus; Switzerland	Bulgaria
7 points	Albania; Denmark; United Kingdom	Cyprus; France; Switzerland; United Kingdom
6 points	Rest of the World	Czechia
5 points	Norway	Ukraine
4 points	Armenia; France	
3 points	Bulgaria; Czechia	Albania; Latvia
2 points	Latvia	
1 point	Luxembourg; Romania; Ukraine	

Points awarded to Australia (Final)
Score	Televote	Jury
12 points		Armenia; Israel; Romania
10 points	Armenia; Austria; Israel; Malta	Belgium; Luxembourg
8 points		Bulgaria; Malta; Sweden
7 points	United Kingdom	Austria; Croatia; Finland; Greece; Norway; Poland
6 points	Norway; Sweden	Czechia; Switzerland
5 points	Azerbaijan; Cyprus; Denmark; Estonia; Poland; San Marino; Switzerland	Cyprus; France; Germany
4 points	Albania; Croatia; Portugal	Denmark; Moldova
3 points	Greece; Serbia	United Kingdom
2 points	Georgia; Lithuania; Rest of the World	Serbia; Ukraine
1 point	Belgium; Italy; Montenegro; Romania	Albania

==== Points awarded by Australia ====
Points awarded by Australia (Semi-final 2)
Score	Televote	Jury
12 points	Denmark	Armenia
10 points	Norway	Bulgaria
8 points	Bulgaria	Denmark
7 points	Romania	Norway
6 points	Malta	Romania
5 points	Switzerland	Czechia
4 points	Armenia	Cyprus
3 points	Czechia	Switzerland
2 points	Albania	Luxembourg
1 point	Cyprus	Malta

Points awarded by Australia (Final)
Score	Televote	Jury
12 points	Bulgaria	Bulgaria
10 points	Finland	France
8 points	Greece	Poland
7 points	Croatia	Czechia
6 points	Romania	Norway
5 points	Moldova	Denmark
4 points	Malta	Finland
3 points	Denmark	Cyprus
2 points	Norway	Greece
1 point	France	Italy

==== Detailed voting results ====
Each participating broadcaster assembles a seven-member jury panel consisting of music industry professionals who are citizens of the country they represent and two of which have to be between 18 and 25 years old. Each jury, and individual jury member, is required to meet a strict set of criteria regarding professional background, as well as diversity in gender and age. No member of a national jury was permitted to be related in any way to any of the competing acts in such a way that they cannot vote impartially and independently. The individual rankings of each jury member as well as the nation's televoting results were released shortly after the grand final.

The following members comprised the Australian jury:

- Matt Gilbertson
- Michael Ross (represented Australia in the Eurovision Song Contest 2024 as part of Electric Fields)
- Mitchell Churi
- Erica Padilla
- Indiana Massara
- Kelley Abbey
- Peta Jane Millgate

Detailed voting results from Australia (Semi-final 2)
R/O	Country	Jury									Televote	
R/O	Country	Juror A	Juror B	Juror C	Juror D	Juror E	Juror F	Juror G	Rank	Points	Rank	Points
01	Bulgaria	3	1	2	3	2	3	2	2	10	3	8
02	Azerbaijan	13	14	13	12	14	14	7	14		14	
03	Romania	5	11	3	2	6	12	3	5	6	4	7
04	Luxembourg	12	10	11	10	7	5	10	9	2	11	
05	Czechia	7	6	6	7	4	1	11	6	5	8	3
06	Armenia	1	4	1	4	1	2	1	1	12	7	4
07	Switzerland	8	9	7	6	11	6	9	8	3	6	5
08	Cyprus	4	3	8	8	8	13	5	7	4	10	1
09	Latvia	14	8	14	14	10	4	14	11		13	
10	Denmark	6	5	4	1	3	7	4	3	8	1	12
11	Australia											
12	Ukraine	11	7	12	9	13	10	12	12		12	
13	Albania	9	13	10	13	12	9	13	13		9	2
14	Malta	10	12	9	11	9	8	8	10	1	5	6
15	Norway	2	2	5	5	5	11	6	4	7	2	10

Detailed voting results from Australia (Final)
R/O	Country	Jury									Televote	
R/O	Country	Juror A	Juror B	Juror C	Juror D	Juror E	Juror F	Juror G	Rank	Points	Rank	Points
01	Denmark	3	12	14	9	4	4	12	6	5	8	3
02	Germany	14	13	18	16	16	9	6	13		24	
03	Israel	10	20	21	21	23	18	14	22		20	
04	Belgium	12	14	15	24	22	19	16	21		21	
05	Albania	17	16	11	20	14	23	17	20		19	
06	Greece	15	4	3	12	8	14	15	9	2	3	8
07	Ukraine	18	15	5	8	21	10	13	12		14	
08	Australia											
09	Serbia	22	9	12	23	20	20	10	17		17	
10	Malta	13	10	13	19	17	21	23	19		7	4
11	Czechia	5	3	9	4	13	5	3	4	7	18	
12	Bulgaria	2	1	1	1	2	2	1	1	12	1	12
13	Croatia	20	2	20	11	12	13	9	11		4	7
14	United Kingdom	24	22	19	14	24	24	24	24		15	
15	France	4	5	2	6	1	1	2	2	10	10	1
16	Moldova	9	21	22	22	9	12	22	16		6	5
17	Finland	6	11	7	10	3	8	11	7	4	2	10
18	Poland	1	7	4	2	5	3	8	3	8	16	
19	Lithuania	23	6	17	13	18	22	18	14		22	
20	Sweden	8	17	23	18	15	16	21	18		13	
21	Cyprus	11	8	8	5	10	6	7	8	3	11	
22	Italy	16	18	10	7	6	17	5	10	1	12	
23	Norway	7	19	6	3	11	7	4	5	6	9	2
24	Romania	21	23	16	17	7	11	19	15		5	6
25	Austria	19	24	24	15	19	15	20	23		23	
