= Albania in the Eurovision Song Contest 2026 =

- Eurovision Song Contest 2026
- Participating broadcaster: Radio Televizioni Shqiptar (RTSH)
- Country: Albania
- Selection process: Festivali i Këngës 64
- Selection date: 20 December 2025

Competing entry
- Song: "Nân"
- Artist: Alis
- Songwriters: Alis Kallaçi; Desara Gjini

Placement
- Semi-final result: Qualified (7th, 158 points)
- Final result: 13th, 145 points

Participation chronology

Albania was represented at the Eurovision Song Contest 2026 with the song "Nân", written by Alis Kallaçi and Desara Gjini, and performed by Alis himself. The Albanian participating broadcaster, Radio Televizioni Shqiptar (RTSH), selected its entry through its national selection competition Festivali i Këngës.

Albania was drawn to compete in the second semi-final of the Eurovision Song Contest which took place on 14 May 2026 and was later selected to perform in position 13. At the end of the show, "Nân" was announced among the top 10 entries of the second semi-final and hence qualified to compete in the final. It was later revealed that Albania placed seventh out of the fifteen participating countries in the semi-final with 158 points. In the final, Albania performed in position 5 and placed thirteenth out of the 25 participating, scoring a total of 145 points. This marked Albania's fifth highest placement in the contest.

== Background ==
Prior to the 2026 contest, Radio Televizioni Shqiptar (RTSH) participated in the Eurovision Song Contest representing Albania 21 times since its first entry in 2004. Its highest placing in the contest, to this point, had been fifth place, which was achieved in 2012 with the song "Suus" performed by Rona Nishliu. It accomplished its second-highest placement at its first appearance in 2004, with "The Image of You" performed by Anjeza Shahini finishing seventh. During its tenure in the contest, the nation failed to qualify for the final eight times. In 2025, "Zjerm" performed by Shkodra Elektronike qualified for the final and placed eighth.

As part of its duties as participating broadcaster, RTSH broadcasts the event in Albania and organises Festivali i Këngës, an annual music competition which has been consistently used as its national selection format since its 2004 debut. On 10 June 2025, RTSH confirmed its intention to participate in the 2026 contest, announcing that Festivali i Këngës would again be used to select its entry.

== Before Eurovision ==
=== Festivali i Këngës 64 ===
The Albanian representative for the Eurovision Song Contest 2026 was selected during the 64th edition of Festivali i Këngës, an annual music competition in Albania organised by RTSH at the Palace of Congresses in Tirana. The event took place between 17 and 20 December 2025 and was hosted by Arilena Ara and Salsano Rrapi. The broadcaster opened an application period for interested artists and composers to submit their applications on 1 September 2025, lasting until 30 September 2025, and ultimately selected 28 contestants.

==== Final ====
The final took place on 20 December 2025. The winner, "Nân" by Alis, was selected by a 50/50 combination of votes from a seven-member jury and a public televote.

Final – 20 December 2025
| R/O | Artist | Song | Jury | Televote | Total | Place |
|---|---|---|---|---|---|---|
| 1 | Gerta Mahmutaj | "Në krahët e tu" | 0 | 7 | 7 | 16 |
| 2 | Lynx | "Nuk kthehem pas" | 0 | 0 | 0 | 20 |
| 3 | Frensi | "Tresh" | 22 | 0 | 22 | 11 |
| 4 | Evi Reçi | "Kodi i jetës" | 0 | 0 | 0 | 20 |
| 5 | Rezarta Smaja | "Balukeprera" | 15 | 0 | 15 | 13 |
| 6 | Rigersa Loka | "Albanian Heart" | 5 | 0 | 5 | 17 |
| 7 | Vedat Ademi | "Kur fjala mbaron" | 42 | 21 | 63 | 5 |
| 8 | Erik Lloshi | "Dy pika dashuri" | 4 | 0 | 4 | 18 |
| 9 | Kleansa Susaj | "Hije" | 0 | 0 | 0 | 20 |
| 10 | Sara Kapo | "Të dua shumë" | 6 | 49 | 55 | 6 |
| 11 | Sheila | "Zemra e tokës" | 65 | 28 | 93 | 3 |
| 12 | Savjana Vjerdha | "Dimër për dimër e vjeshtë për vjeshtë" | 11 | 0 | 11 | 14 |
| 13 | 2Farm | "Valle mbi hi" | 10 | 42 | 52 | 8 |
| 14 | Kamela Islamaj | "Pa pretendime" | 4 | 0 | 4 | 18 |
| 15 | Gresa Gjocera and Bledi Kaso | "Busulla e zemrës" | 0 | 0 | 0 | 20 |
| 16 | Inis Neziri | "Ta kam fal" | 32 | 70 | 102 | 2 |
| 17 | Lorenc Hasrama | "Lamtumirë" | 10 | 0 | 10 | 15 |
| 18 | Endri Kaçaçi | "Si unë" | 40 | 14 | 54 | 7 |
| 19 | Luna Çausholli | "Pa kufij" | 1 | 35 | 36 | 9 |
| 20 | Alis | "Nân" | 68 | 84 | 152 | 1 |
| 21 | Ghiti | "Okej!" | 17 | 0 | 17 | 12 |
| 22 | Enxhi Nasufi | "Dritë" | 25 | 0 | 25 | 10 |
| 23 | Fifi and Tiri Gjoci | "Rri" | 29 | 56 | 85 | 4 |

== At Eurovision ==
The Eurovision Song Contest 2026 took place at the Wiener Stadthalle in Vienna, Austria, and consisted of two semi-finals held on the respective dates of 12 and 14 May and the final on 16 May 2026. All nations with the exceptions of the host country and the "Big Four" (France, Germany, Italy and the United Kingdom) were required to qualify from one of two semi-finals in order to compete for the final; the top ten countries from each semi-final progressed to the final. On 12 January 2026, an allocation draw was held to determine which of the two semi-finals, as well as which half of the show, each country performed in; the European Broadcasting Union (EBU) split up the competing countries into different pots based on voting patterns from previous contests, with countries with favourable voting histories put into the same pot. Albania was scheduled for the second half of the second semi-final.

=== Voting ===
==== Points awarded to Albania ====
Points awarded to Albania (Semi-Final 2)
| Score | Televote | Jury |
|---|---|---|
| 12 points | Bulgaria; Romania | Azerbaijan; Cyprus |
| 10 points | Switzerland | |
| 8 points | Armenia; Norway | |
| 7 points | France; Malta; Rest of the World | |
| 6 points | Azerbaijan; Czechia; Luxembourg; Ukraine | |
| 5 points | Cyprus | Malta |
| 4 points | Denmark | Czechia; Norway |
| 3 points | Austria; United Kingdom | Bulgaria |
| 2 points | Australia | Luxembourg |
| 1 point | Latvia | Armenia; Austria; Switzerland |

Points awarded to Albania (Final)
| Score | Televote | Jury |
|---|---|---|
| 12 points | | Portugal |
| 10 points | Montenegro | Montenegro |
| 8 points | Bulgaria; Croatia; Greece | Croatia; Cyprus |
| 7 points | Italy; Switzerland | |
| 6 points | Malta | Azerbaijan; Malta |
| 5 points | Moldova; Rest of the World; Romania | San Marino |
| 4 points | France | |
| 3 points | Norway; Luxembourg | Belgium |
| 2 points | Belgium | |
| 1 point | Denmark; Israel; San Marino; Serbia | Greece; Israel |

==== Points awarded by Albania ====
Points awarded by Albania (Semi-final 2)
| Score | Televote | Jury |
|---|---|---|
| 12 points | Bulgaria | Malta |
| 10 points | Denmark | Czechia |
| 8 points | Norway | Cyprus |
| 7 points | Australia | Denmark |
| 6 points | Malta | Bulgaria |
| 5 points | Ukraine | Norway |
| 4 points | Cyprus | Armenia |
| 3 points | Romania | Australia |
| 2 points | Switzerland | Romania |
| 1 point | Latvia | Ukraine |

Points awarded by Albania (Final)
| Score | Televote | Jury |
|---|---|---|
| 12 points | Italy | Italy |
| 10 points | Israel | Norway |
| 8 points | Greece | Israel |
| 7 points | Ukraine | Czechia |
| 6 points | Bulgaria | Malta |
| 5 points | Romania | Denmark |
| 4 points | Australia | France |
| 3 points | Serbia | Bulgaria |
| 2 points | Croatia | Greece |
| 1 point | Finland | Australia |

==== Detailed voting results ====
Each participating broadcaster assembles a seven-member jury panel consisting of music industry professionals who are citizens of the country they represent and two of which have to be between 18 and 25 years old. Each jury, and individual jury member, is required to meet a strict set of criteria regarding professional background, as well as diversity in gender and age. No member of a national jury was permitted to be related in any way to any of the competing acts in such a way that they cannot vote impartially and independently. The individual rankings of each jury member as well as the nation's televoting results were released shortly after the grand final.

The following members comprised the Albanian jury:

- Armand Broshka
- Aulon Naçi
- Sokol Marsi
- Eriona Rushiti
- Fjodora Fjota
- Inis Neziri
- Luna Çausholli

Detailed voting results from Albania (Semi-final 2)
| R/O | Country | Jury | | | | | | | | | Televote | |
| R/O | Country | Juror A | Juror B | Juror C | Juror D | Juror E | Juror F | Juror G | Rank | Points | Rank | Points |
|---|---|---|---|---|---|---|---|---|---|---|---|---|
| 01 | Bulgaria | 13 | 7 | 5 | 10 | 5 | 1 | 2 | 5 | 6 | 1 | 12 |
| 02 | Azerbaijan | 9 | 9 | 13 | 13 | 14 | 10 | 4 | 11 | | 14 | |
| 03 | Romania | 11 | 10 | 8 | 11 | 4 | 2 | 5 | 9 | 2 | 8 | 3 |
| 04 | Luxembourg | 7 | 11 | 11 | 7 | 13 | 13 | 13 | 12 | | 11 | |
| 05 | Czechia | 5 | 6 | 2 | 6 | 1 | 4 | 6 | 2 | 10 | 12 | |
| 06 | Armenia | 10 | 8 | 3 | 8 | 2 | 6 | 7 | 7 | 4 | 13 | |
| 07 | Switzerland | 12 | 12 | 12 | 9 | 10 | 11 | 10 | 13 | | 9 | 2 |
| 08 | Cyprus | 2 | 4 | 9 | 4 | 6 | 9 | 1 | 3 | 8 | 7 | 4 |
| 09 | Latvia | 14 | 13 | 14 | 14 | 12 | 14 | 14 | 14 | | 10 | 1 |
| 10 | Denmark | 6 | 1 | 4 | 1 | 7 | 7 | 11 | 4 | 7 | 2 | 10 |
| 11 | Australia | 8 | 5 | 6 | 2 | 8 | 5 | 12 | 8 | 3 | 4 | 7 |
| 12 | Ukraine | 1 | 14 | 10 | 12 | 11 | 12 | 9 | 10 | 1 | 6 | 5 |
| 13 | Albania | | | | | | | | | | | |
| 14 | Malta | 4 | 3 | 1 | 5 | 3 | 3 | 3 | 1 | 12 | 5 | 6 |
| 15 | Norway | 3 | 2 | 7 | 3 | 9 | 8 | 8 | 6 | 5 | 3 | 8 |

Detailed voting results from Albania (Final)
| R/O | Country | Jury | | | | | | | | | Televote | |
| R/O | Country | Juror A | Juror B | Juror C | Juror D | Juror E | Juror F | Juror G | Rank | Points | Rank | Points |
|---|---|---|---|---|---|---|---|---|---|---|---|---|
| 01 | Denmark | 9 | 8 | 4 | 7 | 7 | 7 | 3 | 6 | 5 | 14 | |
| 02 | Germany | 16 | 22 | 16 | 21 | 17 | 22 | 10 | 20 | | 17 | |
| 03 | Israel | 6 | 1 | 3 | 6 | 2 | 5 | 11 | 3 | 8 | 2 | 10 |
| 04 | Belgium | 21 | 16 | 17 | 18 | 8 | 19 | 24 | 17 | | 23 | |
| 05 | Albania | | | | | | | | | | | |
| 06 | Greece | 11 | 9 | 13 | 11 | 3 | 16 | 6 | 9 | 2 | 3 | 8 |
| 07 | Ukraine | 23 | 19 | 18 | 4 | 16 | 17 | 12 | 15 | | 4 | 7 |
| 08 | Australia | 12 | 13 | 8 | 10 | 10 | 9 | 5 | 10 | 1 | 7 | 4 |
| 09 | Serbia | 17 | 14 | 22 | 24 | 20 | 23 | 21 | 23 | | 8 | 3 |
| 10 | Malta | 5 | 2 | 6 | 5 | 5 | 6 | 13 | 5 | 6 | 15 | |
| 11 | Czechia | 7 | 3 | 5 | 14 | 9 | 1 | 4 | 4 | 7 | 13 | |
| 12 | Bulgaria | 1 | 5 | 11 | 13 | 11 | 13 | 9 | 8 | 3 | 5 | 6 |
| 13 | Croatia | 8 | 12 | 19 | 12 | 12 | 3 | 14 | 12 | | 9 | 2 |
| 14 | United Kingdom | 24 | 24 | 23 | 23 | 23 | 24 | 15 | 24 | | 21 | |
| 15 | France | 2 | 15 | 15 | 2 | 19 | 2 | 22 | 7 | 4 | 11 | |
| 16 | Moldova | 13 | 20 | 14 | 8 | 24 | 8 | 23 | 16 | | 16 | |
| 17 | Finland | 10 | 10 | 9 | 9 | 14 | 4 | 16 | 11 | | 10 | 1 |
| 18 | Poland | 4 | 11 | 7 | 17 | 13 | 14 | 20 | 14 | | 19 | |
| 19 | Lithuania | 19 | 17 | 20 | 19 | 22 | 18 | 18 | 22 | | 24 | |
| 20 | Sweden | 20 | 18 | 10 | 20 | 15 | 21 | 17 | 19 | | 18 | |
| 21 | Cyprus | 14 | 23 | 21 | 16 | 18 | 15 | 19 | 21 | | 12 | |
| 22 | Italy | 3 | 7 | 2 | 1 | 1 | 10 | 2 | 1 | 12 | 1 | 12 |
| 23 | Norway | 18 | 4 | 1 | 3 | 4 | 11 | 1 | 2 | 10 | 20 | |
| 24 | Romania | 15 | 6 | 12 | 15 | 6 | 12 | 8 | 13 | | 6 | 5 |
| 25 | Austria | 22 | 21 | 24 | 22 | 21 | 20 | 7 | 18 | | 22 | |
