= Cold Snap (band) =

Croatian metalcore and groove metal band

- Origin: Varaždin, Croatia
- Genre: metalcore, groove metal, nu metal
- Years active: 2003–present
- Members: Jan Kerekeš; Zoran Ernoić; Leo Friščić; Dario Sambol
- Past members: Danijel Ribić; Nikola; Denis Roškarić; Vlado Soldatek; Dorian Pavlović; Zdravko Lovrić; Dario Berg; Robert Ban Bebek; Nino Friščić

Cold Snap is a Croatian metalcore and groove metal band from Varaždin. The band was founded in 2003. The band currently consists of lead vocalist Jan Kerekeš, guitarist Zoran Ernoić, bass guitarist Leo Friščić and drummer Dario Sambol.

On 3 December 2025, HRT announced that Cold Snap was chosen to compete on Dora 2026, the Croatian national final for Eurovision Song Contest 2026, with the song "Mucho Macho". They performed in the first semi-final on 12 February 2026 and qualified for the grand final, which was held on 15 February. With a combined total of 108 points, they placed 2nd.
