= Czech Republic in the Eurovision Song Contest 2026 =

- Eurovision Song Contest 2026
- Participating broadcaster: Czech Television (ČT)
- Country: Czech Republic
- Selection process: Internal selection
- Announcement date: Artist: 8 March 2026; Song: 11 March 2026

Competing entry
- Song: "Crossroads"
- Artist: Daniel Zizka
- Songwriters: Daniel Žižka; Viliam Béreš

Placement
- Semi-final result: Qualified (9th, 142 points)
- Final result: 16th, 113 points

Participation chronology

The Czech Republic, presented as Czechia, was represented at the Eurovision Song Contest 2026 with the song "Crossroads", written by Daniel Žižka and Viliam Béreš, and performed by Žižka himself, with his last name stylised without diacritics. The Czech participating broadcaster, Czech Television (ČT), internally selected its entry for the contest.

== Background ==
Prior to the 2026 contest, Czech Television (ČT) had participated in the Eurovision Song Contest representing the Czech Republic, presented as Czechia since 2023, thirteen times since its first entry in 2007. Its best result in the contest was sixth, achieved in 2018 with the song "Lie to Me" performed by Mikolas Josef. It competed in the contest on three consecutive occasions between 2007 and 2009 without qualifying to the final, after which ČT withdrew between 2010 and 2014, citing low viewing figures and poor results as reasons for its absence. Since returning to the contest in 2015, the Czech Republic has thus far managed to qualify for the final on five occasions. In 2025, "Kiss Kiss Goodbye" performed by Adonxs failed to qualify for the final.

As part of its duties as participating broadcaster, ČT organises the selection of its entry in the Eurovision Song Contest and broadcasts the event in the country. The broadcaster had used both national finals and internal selections to select its entries in the past. Between 2018 and 2020, and between 2022 and 2024, the national final format ESCZ (formerly titled Eurovision Song CZ) was used as the selection method, while in 2021 and 2025, the Czech entry was internally selected. ČT confirmed its intention to participate in the 2026 contest on 3 September 2025, announcing that it would continue to internally select its entry.

== Before Eurovision ==
=== Internal selection ===
ČT announced in September 2025 that the Czech entry for the Eurovision Song Contest 2026 would be selected internally. Artists and composers were able to submit their proposals to the broadcaster between 3 September 2025 and 19 October 2025. At least one of the main performers was required to either have Czech citizenship, be based in the Czech Republic, or be active on the Czech music scene. Songwriters of any nationality were able to submit songs, and were not required to indicate a performer for their song, who would be selected afterwards. The broadcaster received over 260 submissions at the closing of the deadline, and it was announced in December 2025 that eight entries had been shortlisted.

On 8 March 2026, "Crossroads" performed by Daniel Zizka was announced by ČT as the Czech entry for the 2026 contest. The selection of Žižka and the song, written together with Viliam Béreš, was determined by the combination of votes from an international jury of music professionals and a demoscopic jury composed of members from three countries following an audition round at the ČT studios, and was presented to the public on 11 March alongside an accompanying music video.

The songwriting process for "Crossroads" took approximately a year and a half and after this period it took a further six months to produce the song. When asked whether he kept revisiting the song during this period that he was writing it, Žižka responded "Yes... ...there was so many versions. First, I had the initial like riff or the motif that kind of led the songwriting process on and, uh I wanted to have it, this like, major to minor tonality. Uh, so I kept exploring with the harmony and I felt like there was so many options, too many ways. Uh, and then some lyrics started popping up and then it kind of just happened...".

== At Eurovision ==
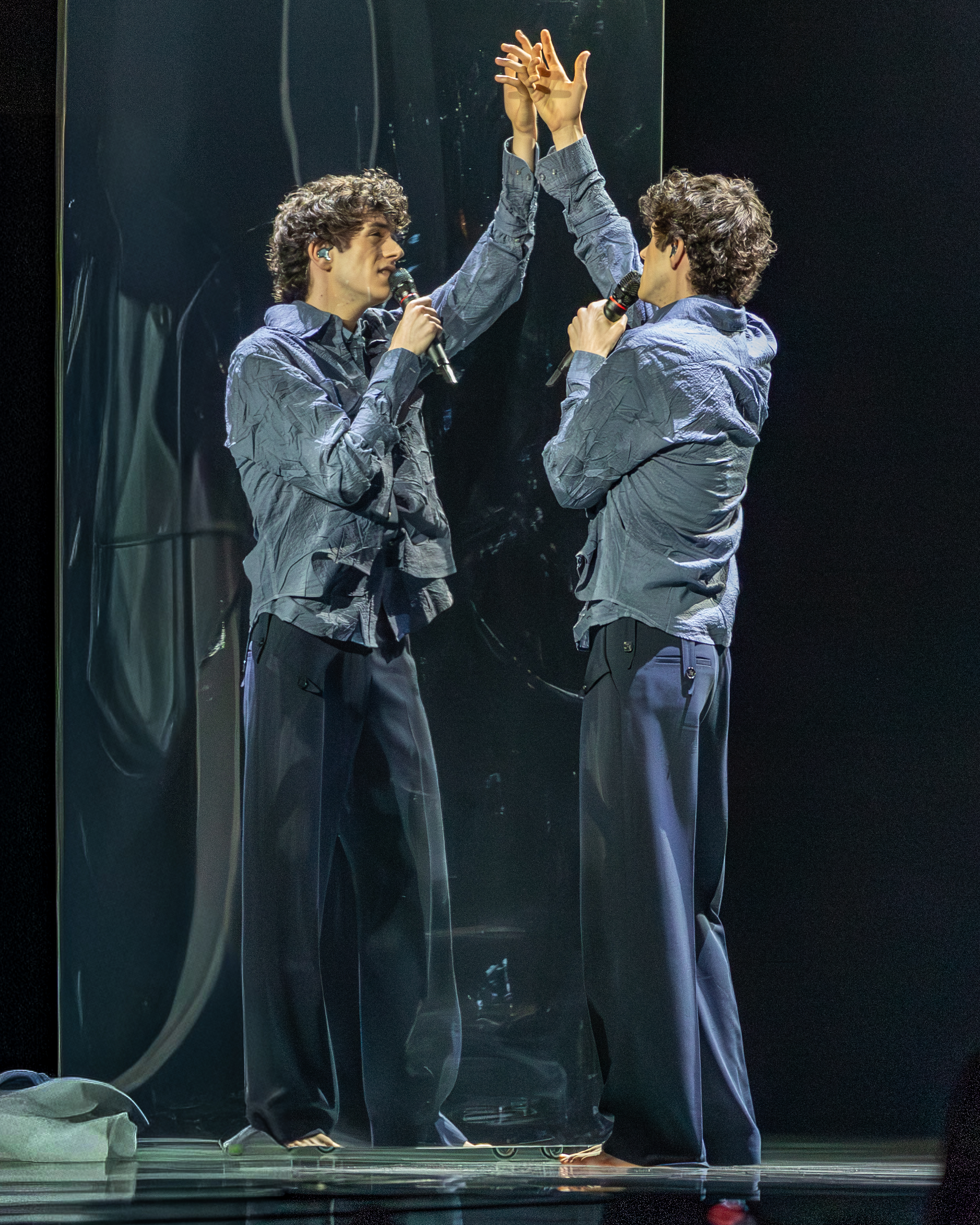
Žižka performing at the second semi-final of the Eurovision Song Contest 2026 in Vienna, Austria

The Eurovision Song Contest 2026 took place at the Wiener Stadthalle in Vienna, Austria, and consisted of two semi-finals held on the respective dates of 12 and 14 May and the final on 16 May 2026. All nations with the exceptions of the host country and the "Big Four" (France, Germany, Italy and the United Kingdom) were required to qualify from one of two semi-finals in order to compete for the final; the top ten countries from each semi-final progressed to the final. On 12 January 2026, an allocation draw was held to determine which of the two semi-finals, as well as which half of the show, each country performed in; the European Broadcasting Union (EBU) split up the competing countries into different pots based on voting patterns from previous contests, with countries with favourable voting histories put into the same pot. Czechia was scheduled for the first half of the second semi-final. The shows' producers then decided the running order for the semi-finals; Czechia was set to perform in position 5.

On 14 May, "Crossroads" qualified for the final, being the last qualifier announced.

=== Technical issues ===
During the Grand Final performance, in which Žižka finished in 16 place out of 25 finalists, technical problems occurred. The Czech delegation subsequently filed a complaint with the European Broadcasting Union (EBU) during the competition and requested a repeat performance due to the technical issues. However, the EBU stated that the incident was only a minor technical problem which, according to the organisers, did not significantly affect the competition, and a repeat performance was therefore not permitted.

=== Performance ===
The song explores the idea of what happens when a person is standing "...at an imaginary crossroads and must choose a further path." and this theme is reflected in the stage performance which builds on ideas of reflection, illusion, and fragmentation. The staging is directed by Ruy Okamura, who also directed the music video for crossroads, and it includes four large movable mirror panels which create constantly changing perspectives on stage, symbolising the different paths and possible outcomes of one's decisions. The repeated reflections of the singer further emphasise the song's introspective atmosphere and the uncertainty tied to moments of choice. When asked "What are you seeing in these mirrors?" Žižka responded "So in these mirrors, we're seeing a lot of like choices, many possible realities, maybe something that can feel overwhelming. You don't know which way to go, many options in life... ...I think it does like a great illusion of like, we don't really know where we're looking at...".

Žižka wears a wrinkled blue shirt, dark trousers, and performs barefoot. His performance in the final was affected by several technical issues: at one point, the image became grainy and froze, and at another, the camera operator was visible after apparently falling over. The Czech delegation submitted a request to perform again but was denied.

=== Voting ===
==== Points awarded to Czechia ====
Points awarded to Czechia (Semi-Final 2)
Score	Televote	Jury
12 points		Latvia; Romania; Switzerland
10 points		Albania; Ukraine
8 points		Denmark; United Kingdom
7 points		Norway
6 points	Romania	Armenia
5 points	Armenia; Ukraine	Australia; Austria; Cyprus
4 points	Azerbaijan; Rest of the World	
3 points	Australia; Denmark	Luxembourg
2 points	Luxembourg; Norway	France; Malta
1 point		Azerbaijan

Points awarded to Czechia (Final)
Score	Televote	Jury
12 points		Latvia
10 points		Switzerland
8 points		Romania; United Kingdom
7 points		Albania; Australia; Sweden; Ukraine
6 points		
5 points		Austria; Denmark; Moldova
4 points	Poland	Armenia; Bulgaria; Poland
3 points	Azerbaijan	
2 points		Cyprus; Finland; Lithuania; Norway
1 point	Armenia; Ukraine	Azerbaijan; Estonia; Georgia

==== Points awarded by Czechia ====
Points awarded by Czechia (Semi-final 2)
Score	Televote	Jury
12 points	Romania	Norway
10 points	Ukraine	Romania
8 points	Bulgaria	Switzerland
7 points	Norway	Denmark
6 points	Albania	Australia
5 points	Switzerland	Latvia
4 points	Denmark	Albania
3 points	Australia	Ukraine
2 points	Malta	Malta
1 point	Luxembourg	Bulgaria

Points awarded by Czechia (Final)
Score	Televote	Jury
12 points	Ukraine	Denmark
10 points	Bulgaria	Norway
8 points	Moldova	Romania
7 points	Romania	Finland
6 points	Greece	Australia
5 points	Israel	Poland
4 points	Croatia	Bulgaria
3 points	Finland	France
2 points	Serbia	Israel
1 point	Denmark	Malta

==== Detailed voting results ====
Each participating broadcaster assembles a seven-member jury panel consisting of music industry professionals who are citizens of the country they represent and two of which have to be between 18 and 25 years old. Each jury, and individual jury member, is required to meet a strict set of criteria regarding professional background, as well as diversity in gender and age. No member of a national jury was permitted to be related in any way to any of the competing acts in such a way that they cannot vote impartially and independently. The individual rankings of each jury member as well as the nation's televoting results were released shortly after the grand final.

The following members comprised the Czech jury:

- Jan Ponocný
- Mirek Kosík
- Čeněk Chleboun
- Alena Shirmanova-Kostebelova (represented Czechia in the Eurovision Song Contest 2024)
- Hana Petřinová
- Nicole Madi

Detailed voting results from Czechia (Semi-final 2)
R/O	Country	Jury								Televote	
R/O	Country	Juror A	Juror B	Juror C	Juror D	Juror E	Juror F	Rank	Points	Rank	Points
01	Bulgaria	5	5	12	7	6	12	10	1	3	8
02	Azerbaijan	8	12	13	14	2	10	12		14	
03	Romania	1	1	2	9	7	13	2	10	1	12
04	Luxembourg	14	14	7	8	10	8	13		10	1
05	Czechia										
06	Armenia	10	4	10	5	11	14	11		11	
07	Switzerland	7	7	3	1	8	2	3	8	6	5
08	Cyprus	13	6	14	12	14	11	14		12	
09	Latvia	6	13	1	13	4	9	6	5	13	
10	Denmark	3	2	6	3	12	3	4	7	7	4
11	Australia	9	3	11	11	1	6	5	6	8	3
12	Ukraine	4	11	9	6	9	4	8	3	2	10
13	Albania	12	8	4	10	3	7	7	4	5	6
14	Malta	11	10	5	4	13	5	9	2	9	2
15	Norway	2	9	8	2	5	1	1	12	4	7

Detailed voting results from Czechia (Final)
R/O	Country	Jury								Televote	
R/O	Country	Juror A	Juror B	Juror C	Juror D	Juror E	Juror F	Rank	Points	Rank	Points
01	Denmark	1	1	7	3	6	1	1	12	10	1
02	Germany	17	24	10	17	22	20	21		24	
03	Israel	9	21	8	24	2	11	9	2	6	5
04	Belgium	15	14	20	20	9	23	19		23	
05	Albania	21	12	23	14	19	22	24		11	
06	Greece	22	18	13	22	17	12	20		5	6
07	Ukraine	12	13	12	9	5	24	14		1	12
08	Australia	6	17	4	1	18	6	5	6	12	
09	Serbia	13	4	17	8	23	7	11		9	2
10	Malta	11	6	19	11	4	19	10	1	18	
11	Czechia										
12	Bulgaria	19	9	5	7	11	3	7	4	2	10
13	Croatia	20	19	11	5	24	13	16		7	4
14	United Kingdom	16	11	24	21	3	16	15		22	
15	France	5	7	9	6	15	10	8	3	15	
16	Moldova	4	15	16	18	10	8	13		3	8
17	Finland	7	8	6	2	7	5	4	7	8	3
18	Poland	3	23	3	10	12	9	6	5	13	
19	Lithuania	18	5	15	13	16	4	12		19	
20	Sweden	23	16	14	4	21	21	17		17	
21	Cyprus	24	20	18	12	20	15	23		21	
22	Italy	14	22	22	19	13	17	22		16	
23	Norway	2	3	1	15	1	18	2	10	14	
24	Romania	8	2	2	16	14	2	3	8	4	7
25	Austria	10	10	21	23	8	14	18		20	
