= Croatia in the Eurovision Song Contest 2026 =

- Eurovision Song Contest 2026
- Participating broadcaster: Croatian Radiotelevision (HRT)
- Country: Croatia
- Selection process: Dora 2026
- Selection date: 15 February 2026

Competing entry
- Song: "Andromeda"
- Artist: Lelek
- Songwriters: Filip Lacković; Lazar Pajić; Tomislav Roso; Zorica Pajić

Placement
- Semi-final result: Qualified (6th, 175 points)
- Final result: 15th, 124 points

Participation chronology

Croatia was represented at the Eurovision Song Contest 2026 with the song "Andromeda", written by Filip Lacković, Lazar Pajić, Tomislav Roso and Zorica Pajić, and performed by the band Lelek. The Croatian participating broadcaster, Croatian Radiotelevision (HRT), organised the national final Dora 2026 in order to select its entry for the contest.

== Background ==
Prior to the 2026 contest, Croatian Radiotelevision (HRT) had participated in the Eurovision Song Contest representing Croatia 30 times since its first entry in 1993. Its best result in the contest was second, achieved in 2024 with the song "Rim Tim Tagi Dim" performed by Baby Lasagna. This was also its first top-five finish since "Marija Magdalena" by Doris Dragović in 1999. Following the introduction of semi-finals in 2004, Croatia had thus far featured in nine finals. In 2025, Croatia failed to qualify to the final with Marko Bošnjak and the song "Poison Cake".

As part of its duties as participating broadcaster, HRT organises the selection of its entry in the Eurovision Song Contest and broadcasts the event in the country. HRT confirmed its participation in the 2026 contest on 22 September 2025. Between 1993 and 2011, HRT organised the national final Dora in order to select its entry. In 2012 and 2013, the broadcaster opted to internally select its entry and continued the internal selection procedure from 2016 to 2018 after missing the contest in 2014 and 2015. Since 2019, it returned to use Dora to select its entry, a method that was continued for its 2026 participation.

== Before Eurovision ==
=== Dora 2026 ===
Dora 2026 was the twenty-seventh edition of the national selection Dora, organised by HRT to select its entry for the Eurovision Song Contest 2026. The competition took place at the HRT studios in Zagreb, and consisted of two semi-finals and a final in February 2026.

==== Competing entries ====
On 22 September 2025, HRT opened a submission period where artists and composers were able to submit their entries to the broadcaster with the deadline on 23 November 2025. 251 entries were received by the broadcaster during the submission period, a new record since Dora was relaunched in 2019. A seven-member expert committee consisting of Tihomir Preradović (composer and music producer), Denis Mujadžić (composer and music producer), Ivana Kindl (singer), Mia Negovetić (singer, composer, voice actress), Monika Lelas Halambek (radio host and editor), Jelena Balent (music editor and singer) and Davor Medaković (music editor) reviewed the received submissions and selected twenty-four artists and songs as well as four backup entries for the competition. HRT announced the competing entries on 3 December 2025. On 10 December 2025, HRT announced that Karolina Ilić was disqualified from the competition due to not being a Croatian citizen, and that she would be replaced by Gabrijel Ivić.

Entry disqualified Replacement entry

Dora 2026 contestants
Artist	Song	Songwriter(s)
Alen Đuras	"From Ashes to Flame"	Alen Đuras; Siniša Reljić Simba
Ananda	"Dora"	Ananda Đuranović; Diogo Guerra; Dora Pejačević; Tchiah Ommar Abdulrahman; Ynke Dingenen
Cold Snap	"Mucho Macho"	Jan Kerekeš; Josip Novak
Devin	"Over Me"	Devin Juraj
Ema Bubić	"Vrijeme za nas"	Lara Pilepić
Fenksta	"Memento mori"	Abby Dank; Emma Gale; Saša Stević
Fran Uccellini	"Ako bolje bude sutra"	Fran Uccellini
Gabrijel Ivić	"Light Up"	Gabrijel Ivić; Jun Ishida
Irma	"Ni traga"	Anja Grabovac; Jan Jakovljev
Ivan Sever	"Crying Eyes"	Aidan O'Connor; Ivan Sever; John Doherty
Jasmina Makota	"Higher"	Jasmina Makota; Marin Hraščanec
Kandžija	"3 ujutro"	Stjepko Galović
~~Karolina Ilić~~	~~"Breathe Her In"~~	Karolina Ilić; Gabriel Ottosson
Lana Mandarić	"Tama"	Lana Mandarić; Zorana Šiljeg
Lara Demarin	"Mantra"	Ananda Đuranović; Lara Demarin; Luka Demarin
Lelek	"Andromeda"	Filip Lacković; Lazar Pajić; Tomislav Roso; Zorica Pajić
Lima Len	"Raketa"	Alen Kozić; Damir Božanić
Marko Kutlić	"Neotuđivo"	Marko Kutlić
Noelle	"Uninterrupted"	Bonnie Max; Filipe Nicolau; Ivana Crnković; Larissa Tormey; Rebecca Lane
Ritam Noir	"Profumi di mare"	Moris Orbanić
Sergej	"Scream"	Laura Sučec; Matej Magdić; Sergej Božić
Stela Rade	"Nema te"	Anja Grabovac; Jan Jakovljev
ToMa	"Ledina"	Jan Jakovljev; Tomislav Marić
Toni Sky	"O ne!"	Toni Volar
Zevin	"My Mind"	Jernej Drnovšek; Nives Cilenšek

Backup entries
#	Artist	Song	Songwriter(s)
1	~~Gabrijel Ivić~~	~~"Light Up"~~	Gabrijel Ivić; Jun Ishida
2	Dorian Stipčić	"Loved"	Ema Dujmović
3	Bria	"Soho"	Lukša Vučlč; Montana; Branimir Ančlć
4	Vanessa Kralj	"Tišina prije kiše"	Vanessa Kraij; Hrvoje Domazet; Ante Domazet

==== Semi-finals ====
The two semi-finals took place on 12 and 13 February 2026 respectively. Twelve acts competed in each semi-final, with the top eight entries qualifying for the final.

Semi-final 1 – 12 February 2026
R/O	Artist	Song	Televote			Place
R/O	Artist	Song	Phone	SMS	Total	Place
1	Lima Len	"Raketa"	1,913	1,376	3,289	4
2	Jasmina Makota	"Higher"	487	474	961	11
3	Ananda	"Dora"	658	926	1,584	8
4	Toni Sky	"O ne!"	363	333	696	12
5	Fran Uccellini	"Ako bolje bude sutra"	640	634	1,274	9
6	Ema Bubić	"Vrijeme za nas"	1,313	968	2,281	6
7	Noelle	"Uninterrupted"	1,087	915	2,002	7
8	Alen Đuras	"From Ashes to Flame"	1,709	822	2,531	5
9	Fenksta	"Memento mori"	635	602	1,237	10
10	Cold Snap	"Mucho Macho"	2,851	3,882	6,733	2
11	ToMa	"Ledina"	2,126	1,564	3,690	3
12	Lelek	"Andromeda"	4,767	4,819	9,586	1

Semi-final 2 – 13 February 2026
R/O	Artist	Song	Televote			Place
R/O	Artist	Song	Phone	SMS	Total	Place
1	Ritam Noir	"Profumi di mare"	2,755	1,829	4,584	1
2	Irma	"Ni traga"	1,514	1,131	2,645	6
3	Gabrijel Ivić	"Light Up"	467	545	1,012	12
4	Zevin	"My Mind"	1,127	880	2,007	9
5	Ivan Sever	"Crying Eyes"	909	807	1,716	10
6	Lana Mandarić	"Tama"	561	1,804	2,365	8
7	Stela Rade	"Nema te"	2,442	1,710	4,152	2
8	Devin	"Over Me"	1,664	1,609	3,273	4
9	Kandžija	"3 ujutro"	643	1,039	1,682	11
10	Marko Kutlić	"Neotuđivo"	1,777	1,395	3,172	5
11	Sergej	"Scream"	1,388	1,128	2,516	7
12	Lara Demarin	"Mantra"	1,874	1,710	3,584	3

==== Final ====
The final took place on 15 February 2026 and featured the 16 qualifiers from the preceding two semi-finals. The winner, "Andromeda" performed by Lelek, was decided by a combination of votes from a professional jury and the Croatian public via televoting.

Final – 15 February 2026
R/O	Artist	Song	Jury	Televote				Total	Place
R/O	Artist	Song	Jury	Phone	SMS	Total	Points	Total	Place
1	Ananda	"Dora"	13	1,117	1,140	2,257	7	20	15
2	Sergej	"Scream"	33	1,820	1,144	2,964	9	42	10
3	Noelle	"Uninterrupted"	27	2,014	1,488	3,502	11	38	13
4	Alen Đuras	"From Ashes to Flame"	41	3,111	1,620	4,731	15	56	7
5	Irma	"Ni traga"	32	1,999	1,592	3,591	11	43	8
6	Lara Demarin	"Mantra"	22	2,848	2,756	5,604	18	40	12
7	Ema Bubić	"Vrijeme za nas"	3	1,728	1,188	2,916	9	12	16
8	Lima Len	"Raketa"	20	6,297	4,903	11,200	36	56	6
9	Lana Mandarić	"Tama"	21	988	2,483	3,471	11	32	14
10	Ritam Noir	"Profumi di mare"	5	6,086	4,864	10,950	35	40	11
11	Marko Kutlić	"Neotuđivo"	20	3,902	3,091	6,993	22	42	9
12	Devin	"Over Me"	22	6,157	6,177	12,334	39	61	5
13	Lelek	"Andromeda"	77	14,075	15,990	30,065	96	173	1
14	ToMa	"Ledina"	44	5,232	3,303	8,535	27	71	4
15	Stela Rade	"Nema te"	46	8,379	6,238	14,617	47	93	3
16	Cold Snap	"Mucho Macho"	38	9,274	12,593	21,867	70	108	2

Detailed jury results
R/O	Song	Regional juries				International juries				Total
R/O	Song	Zagreb	Split	Rijeka	Osijek	Luxembourg	Norway	San Marino	United Kingdom	Total
R/O	Song	Zagreb	Split	Rijeka	Osijek	Luxembourg	Norway	San Marino	United Kingdom	Total
1	"Dora"					3	8		2	13
2	"Scream"	4	1	6	1	5	2	10	4	33
3	"Uninterrupted"	2	2		3		3	5	12	27
4	"From Ashes to Flame"	10	5	8	6	4	5	3		41
5	"Ni traga"	7		1	2	8	6	7	1	32
6	"Mantra"		4		4		7	1	6	22
7	"Vrijeme za nas"			3						3
8	"Raketa"	8		2					10	20
9	"Tama"					6	10		5	21
10	"Profumi di mare"						1	4		5
11	"Neotuđivo"	6	6			2		6		20
12	"Over Me"	1	3	4	10	1			3	22
13	"Andromeda"	3	12	10	8	12	12	12	8	77
14	"Ledina"	5	7	7	7	10		8		44
15	"Nema te"	12	8	12	5	7		2		46
16	"Mucho Macho"		10	5	12		4		7	38

==== Ratings ====
Viewing figures by show
Show	Air date	Viewership	Share (%)
Semi-final 1	12 February 2026		
Semi-final 2	13 February 2026		
Final	15 February 2026		36.3%

=== Promotion ===
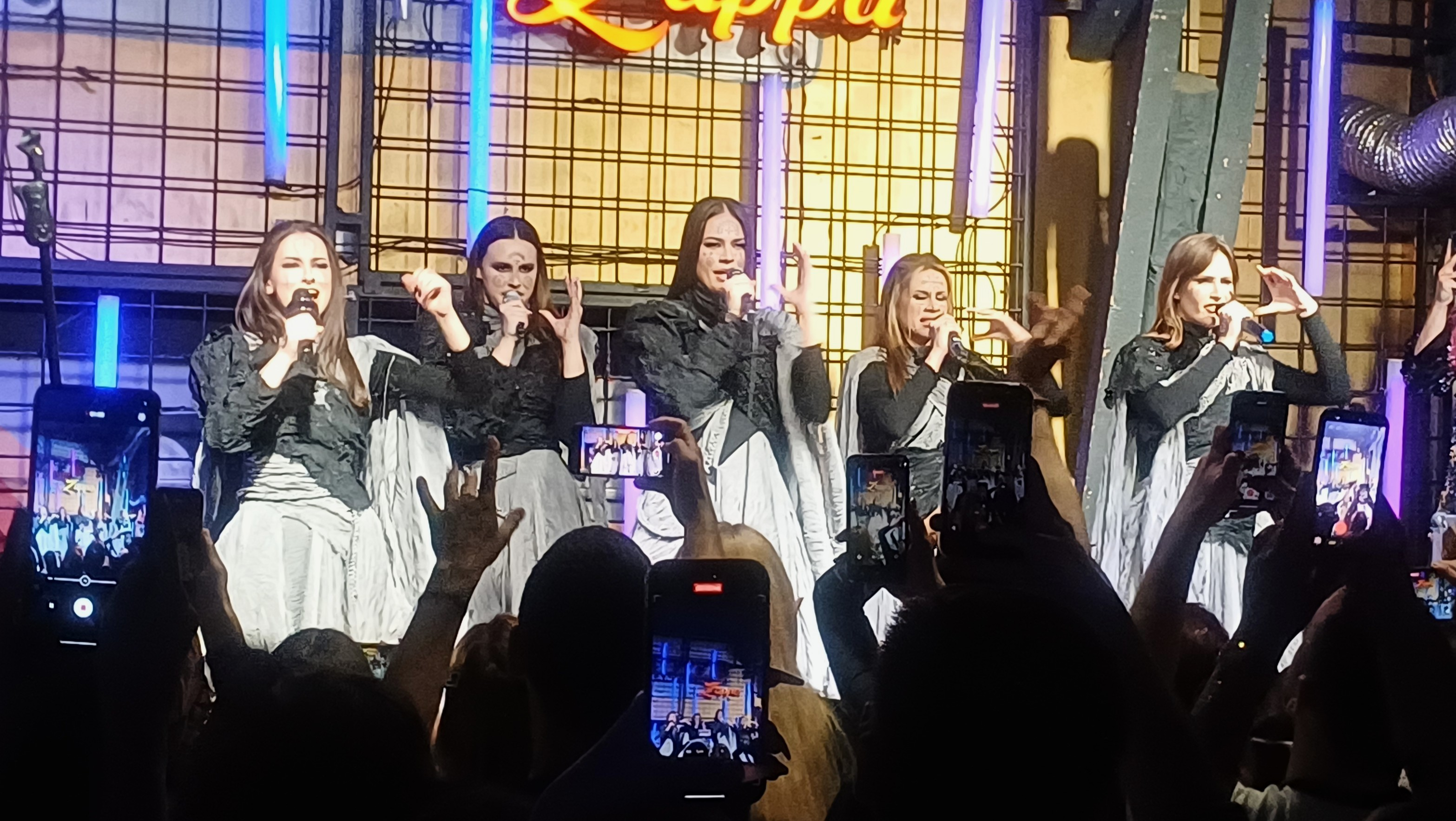
Lelek at the PzE Afterparty event in Belgrade

As part of the promotion of their participation in the contest, Lelek attended Eurovision in Concert on 11 April 2026, London Eurovision Party on 19 April and PzE Afterparty on 22 April 2026.

== At Eurovision ==
The Eurovision Song Contest 2026 took place at the Wiener Stadthalle in Vienna, Austria, and consisted of two semi-finals held on the respective dates of 12 and 14 May and the final on 16 May 2026. All nations with the exceptions of the host country and the "Big Four" (France, Germany, Italy and the United Kingdom) were required to qualify from one of two semi-finals in order to compete for the final; the top ten countries from each semi-final progressed to the final. On 12 January 2026, an allocation draw was held to determine which of the two semi-finals, as well as which half of the show, each country performed in; the European Broadcasting Union (EBU) split up the competing countries into different pots based on voting patterns from previous contests, with countries with favourable voting histories put into the same pot.

=== Semi final ===
Croatia was allocated for the first semi final, and later, was announced to perform in position three during the show. Shortly after, the qualification–announcement segment took place, and, at the end of the segment Croatia was announced as one of the ten qualifiers, therefore, Croatia would move on onto the final, after non-qualifying in 2025.

=== Final ===
Croatia performed in 13th place in the final and finished 15th overall.

=== Voting ===
==== Points awarded to Croatia ====
Points awarded to Croatia (Semi-Final 1)
Score	Televote	Jury
12 points	Serbia	
10 points	Montenegro	Finland; Montenegro
8 points		Germany; Portugal; Sweden
7 points	Israel; Moldova	Belgium; Moldova
6 points	Finland; Germany	Estonia; Greece; San Marino
5 points	Belgium; Greece; Italy; Portugal	
4 points	Poland; Rest of the World; Sweden	
3 points	Estonia; Lithuania; San Marino	Georgia
2 points		Poland; Serbia
1 point	Georgia	Italy; Lithuania

Points awarded to Croatia (Final)
Score	Televote	Jury
12 points	Serbia	
10 points		
8 points	Austria; Montenegro; Ukraine	Montenegro; Portugal
7 points	Australia; Germany	Azerbaijan; Luxembourg
6 points		Sweden
5 points		Finland
4 points	Bulgaria; Czechia	Estonia; Greece
3 points		
2 points	Albania; Finland; Moldova; Romania; Switzerland	Germany; Romania
1 point	France; Greece; Portugal	

==== Points awarded by Croatia ====
Points awarded by Croatia (Semi-final 1)
Score	Televote	Jury
12 points	Serbia	Israel
10 points	Montenegro	Finland
8 points	Moldova	Poland
7 points	Poland	Serbia
6 points	Israel	Moldova
5 points	Portugal	Sweden
4 points	Greece	Greece
3 points	Finland	Lithuania
2 points	Estonia	Belgium
1 point	Sweden	Montenegro

Points awarded by Croatia (Final)
Score	Televote	Jury
12 points	Serbia	Serbia
10 points	Italy	Denmark
8 points	Albania	Albania
7 points	Bulgaria	Australia
6 points	Moldova	Finland
5 points	Romania	Israel
4 points	Australia	Bulgaria
3 points	Greece	France
2 points	Finland	Poland
1 point	Ukraine	Moldova

==== Detailed voting results ====
Each participating broadcaster assembles a seven-member jury panel consisting of music industry professionals who are citizens of the country they represent and two of which have to be between 18 and 25 years old. Each jury, and individual jury member, is required to meet a strict set of criteria regarding professional background, as well as diversity in gender and age. No member of a national jury was permitted to be related in any way to any of the competing acts in such a way that they cannot vote impartially and independently. The individual rankings of each jury member as well as the nation's televoting results were released shortly after the grand final.

The following members comprised the Croatian jury:

- Devin Juraj
- Duško Mandić
- Igor Barberić
- Doris Karamatić
- Lu Jakelić
- Martina Validžić
- Vlatka Kladarić

Detailed voting results from Croatia (Semi-final 1)
R/O	Country	Jury									Televote	
R/O	Country	Juror A	Juror B	Juror C	Juror D	Juror E	Juror F	Juror G	Rank	Points	Rank	Points
01	Moldova	9	3	6	4	11	6	6	5	6	3	8
02	Sweden	10	7	8	3	9	2	10	6	5	10	1
03	Croatia											
04	Greece	4	8	12	5	10	4	7	7	4	7	4
05	Portugal	12	11	11	10	3	10	11	11		6	5
06	Georgia	14	14	14	14	14	13	12	14		14	
07	Finland	6	1	10	2	4	1	2	2	10	8	3
08	Montenegro	3	13	7	7	13	12	9	10	1	2	10
09	Estonia	13	9	9	12	5	11	14	12		9	2
10	Israel	2	2	3	9	2	3	1	1	12	5	6
11	Belgium	8	10	5	8	6	5	8	9	2	11	
12	Lithuania	7	5	4	11	12	9	4	8	3	12	
13	San Marino	11	12	13	13	7	14	13	13		13	
14	Poland	5	4	1	6	1	7	3	3	8	4	7
15	Serbia	1	6	2	1	8	8	5	4	7	1	12

Detailed voting results from Croatia (Final)
R/O	Country	Jury									Televote	
R/O	Country	Juror A	Juror B	Juror C	Juror D	Juror E	Juror F	Juror G	Rank	Points	Rank	Points
01	Denmark	1	10	2	12	7	13	1	2	10	12	
02	Germany	21	11	17	22	11	20	21	22		19	
03	Israel	6	3	15	7	17	1	19	6	5	13	
04	Belgium	16	9	11	10	20	12	7	15		23	
05	Albania	4	23	3	2	2	15	14	3	8	3	8
06	Greece	13	12	7	18	10	7	10	13		8	3
07	Ukraine	18	18	12	23	12	21	20	23		10	1
08	Australia	9	6	4	17	4	5	3	4	7	7	4
09	Serbia	8	17	1	1	1	9	15	1	12	1	12
10	Malta	11	7	16	8	18	10	12	14		18	
11	Czechia	10	22	24	24	14	22	8	20		20	
12	Bulgaria	5	21	5	16	6	8	2	7	4	4	7
13	Croatia											
14	United Kingdom	23	16	6	15	16	16	13	18		22	
15	France	2	13	9	20	22	2	5	8	3	11	
16	Moldova	7	19	10	4	3	14	9	10	1	5	6
17	Finland	3	8	8	14	9	3	4	5	6	9	2
18	Poland	14	1	13	5	15	4	17	9	2	14	
19	Lithuania	19	24	23	19	21	6	24	21		21	
20	Sweden	15	14	20	13	13	18	6	17		16	
21	Cyprus	20	15	22	21	19	23	22	24		15	
22	Italy	22	2	14	6	5	19	23	11		2	10
23	Norway	17	4	18	3	24	17	11	12		17	
24	Romania	12	20	21	9	8	24	18	19		6	5
25	Austria	24	5	19	11	23	11	16	16		24	
