= Poland in the Eurovision Song Contest 2026 =

- Eurovision Song Contest 2026
- Participating broadcaster: Telewizja Polska (TVP)
- Country: Poland
- Selection process: Finał krajowych kwalifikacji
- Selection date: 8 March 2026

Competing entry
- Song: "Pray"
- Artist: Alicja
- Songwriters: Alicja Szemplińska; Sinclair Alan Malcolm; Weronika Gabryelczyk

Placement
- Semi-final result: Qualified (2nd, 247 points)
- Final result: 12th, 150 points

Participation chronology

Poland was represented at the Eurovision Song Contest 2026 with the song "Pray", written by Alicja Szemplińska, Sinclair Alan Malcolm and Weronika Gabryelczyk, and performed by Alicja herself. The Polish participating broadcaster, Telewizja Polska (TVP), organised the national final Finał krajowych kwalifikacji in order to select its entry for the contest.

Poland was drawn to compete in the first semi-final of the Eurovision Song Contest which took place on 12 May 2026. Performing during the show in position 14, "Pray" was announced among the top 10 entries of the first semi-final and therefore qualified to compete in the final on 16 May. It was later revealed that Poland placed second out of the 15 participating countries in the semi-final with 247 points. In the final, Poland performed in position 18 and placed twelfth out of the 25 participating countries, scoring 150 points.

== Background ==
Prior to the 2026 contest, Telewizja Polska (TVP) had participated in the Eurovision Song Contest representing Poland twenty-seven times since its first entry in 1994. Its highest placement in the contest, to this point, had been second place, achieved with its debut entry in 1994, "To nie ja!" performed by Edyta Górniak. It had only reached the top ten on two other occasions, when "Keine Grenzen – Żadnych granic" performed Ich Troje finished seventh in 2003, and when "Color of Your Life" performed by Michał Szpak finished eighth in 2016. Following the introduction of semi-finals for the 2004 contest, Poland managed to qualify for the final nine times; additionally, TVP was absent from the contest in 2012 and 2013. In 2025, "Gaja" performed by Justyna Steczkowska qualified for the final, eventually finishing 14th.

As part of its duties as participating broadcaster, TVP organises the selection of its entry in the Eurovision Song Contest and broadcasts the event in the country. It had selected its entry for the contest both through national finals and internal selections in the past. In 2025, the broadcaster selected its entry through the national final Wielki finał polskich kwalifikacji. On 3 November 2025, TVP confirmed its intention to participate in the 2026 contest and to again select its entry through a televised final.

== Before Eurovision ==
=== Finał krajowych kwalifikacji ===
Finał krajowych kwalifikacji ("The final of the national qualifiers") was the national final format developed by TVP in order to select its entry for the Eurovision Song Contest 2026. The competition consisted of a final filmed at the TVP studios in Warsaw on 1 March 2026; it was hosted by Artur Orzech and aired on 7 March 2026 on TVP1 and TVP Polonia, with the results announced the following day during the morning show Pytanie na śniadanie on TVP2. Both broadcasts were also shown online via the streaming platform TVP VOD. The final was watched by 566 thousand viewers in Poland for a 6.11% share.

==== Competing entries ====
On 3 November 2025, TVP opened a submission period for interested artists lasting until 24 November 2025. Applicants were required to hold Polish citizenship for their entries to qualify to compete. At the closing of the deadline, 173 entries had been received. The submissions were assessed by an 11-member jury composed of representatives from the Polish music industry, media and the broadcaster itself, and chaired by Piotr Klatt, which shortlisted 20 artists and songs based on the ten favourites of each jury member and subsequently oversaw a live audition phase on 18 December 2025, with the possibility for artists deemed by the selection committee to have established musical careers to be exempt from this stage. Following the live auditions, by 20 December 2025, the jury had selected ten finalists (plus two backups); the final list of selected entries was later revised, with Karolina Czarnecka withdrawing and eight finalists subsequently announced on 14 January 2026.

Among the selected competing artists was Alicja, who was set to represent Poland in 2020 before the contest's cancellation.

Key: Entry withdrawn

Artist	Song	Songwriter(s)
Alicja	"Pray"	Alicja Szemplińska; Sinclair Alan Malcolm; Weronika Gabryelczyk
Anastazja	"Wild Child"	Anastazja Maciąg; Andrzej Jaworski; Bruce Smith; Tchiah Ommar Abdulrahman; Tobi Verheij; Ynke Dingenen
Basia Giewont	"Zimna woda"	Barbara Gąsienica-Giewont; Korneliusz Flisiak
Jeremi Sikorski	"Cienie przeszłości"	Albert Markiewicz; Aleksander Krzyżanowski; Jeremi Sikorski
~~Karolina Czarnecka~~	~~"Jedna chwila"~~	Karolina Czarnecka; Mike Johnson
Karolina Szczurowska	"Nie bój się"	Grzegorz Stasiuk; Marek Dutkiewicz
Ola Antoniak	"Don't You Try"	Aldona Dąbrowska; Sławomir Sokołowski
Piotr Pręgowski	"Parawany tango"	Bartosz Miecznikowski; Piotr Pręgowski
Stasiek Kukulski	"This Too Shall Pass"	Marek Mościcki-Halicki; Michał Lange; Patrycja Kosiarkiewicz; Stanisław Kukulski; Thomas Karlsson

==== Final ====
The final was aired on 7 March 2026. The winner, "Pray" by Alicja, was selected exclusively by a public vote. Viewers could vote for each song up to three times via the TVP VOD application throughout the week preceding the show and later via SMS, with the voting lines opened during the broadcast and closed at midnight on 8 March. In addition to the competing entries, the show featured guest performances by Michał Wiśniewski (2003 and 2006 Polish representative as part of the group Ich Troje) and Viki Gabor (2019 junior contest winner).

Final – 7 March 2026
R/O	Artist	Song	Public vote			Place
R/O	Artist	Song	App	Televote	Total	Place
1	Anastazja	"Wild Child"	2,837	438	3,275	7
2	Piotr Pręgowski	"Parawany tango"	7,996	1,353	9,349	4
3	Karolina Szczurowska	"Nie bój się"	2,378	2,804	5,182	6
4	Stasiek Kukulski	"This Too Shall Pass"	4,045	3,793	7,838	5
5	Basia Giewont	"Zimna woda"	7,981	3,879	11,860	3
6	Alicja	"Pray"	20,350	5,742	26,092	1
7	Jeremi Sikorski	"Cienie przeszłości"	2,244	675	2,919	8
8	Ola Antoniak	"Don't You Try"	11,306	3,686	14,992	2

=== Promotion ===
As part of the promotion of her participation in the contest, Alicja attended the Eurovision in Concert event in Amsterdam on 11 April 2026 and the London Eurovision Party on 19 April 2026. On 28 April 2026, she attended a press conference organised by TVP, where she introduced the creative team behind her Eurovision performance. In addition, she performed at the Eurovision Village in Vienna on 13 May 2026.

== At Eurovision ==
Alicja during a dress rehearsal for the first semi-final.

The Eurovision Song Contest 2026 took place at the Wiener Stadthalle in Vienna, Austria, and consisted of two semi-finals held on the respective dates of 12 and 14 May and the final on 16 May 2026. All nations with the exceptions of the host country and the "Big Four" (France, Germany, Italy and the United Kingdom) were required to qualify from one of two semi-finals in order to compete for the final; the top ten countries from each semi-final progressed to the final. On 12 January 2026, an allocation draw was held to determine which of the two semi-finals, as well as which half of the show, each country would perform in; the European Broadcasting Union (EBU) split up the competing countries into different pots based on voting patterns from previous contests, with countries with favourable voting histories put into the same pot. Poland was scheduled for the second half of the first semi-final. The shows' producers then decided the running order for the semi-finals; Poland was set to perform in position 14.

In Poland, all shows were broadcast on TVP1, with commentary provided by Artur Orzech. In addition, TVP aired the contest internationally through TVP Polonia as well as on its streaming platform TVP VOD.

=== Performance ===
Alicja took part in technical rehearsals on 3 and 7 May, followed by dress rehearsals on 11 and 12 May. Her performance of "Pray" at the contest was staged by Kamil Staszczyszyn and choreographed by Adam Beta and Tina Papazyan, with Krystian Rzymkiewicz, Oskar Borkowski, Stefano Silvino and Włodek Kołobycz as supporting dancers; a large inclined platform was heavily featured as the central element of the staging on which the dancers perform acrobatic choreography and which is also climbed by Alicja, who wears a silver metallic armour-inspired outfit. It had been anticipated that the performance would feature a "monumental" prop.

=== Semi-final ===
Poland performed in position 14, following the entry from San Marino and before the entry from Serbia. At the end of the show, the country was announced as a qualifier for the final. It was later revealed that Poland placed second out of the fifteen participating countries in the first semi-final with 247 points; 110 points from the public televoting and 137 points from the juries.

=== Final ===
Following the semi-final, Poland was drawn to perform in the second half of the final. Poland performed in position 18, following the entry from Finland and before the entry from Lithuania. Alicja once again took part in dress rehearsals on 15 and 16 May before the final, including the jury final where the professional juries cast their final votes before the live show on 16 May. Poland placed twelfth in the final, scoring 150 points; 17 points from the public televoting and 133 points from the juries.

=== Voting ===
Below is a breakdown of points awarded by and to Poland in the first semi-final and in the final. Voting during the three shows involved each country awarding sets of points from 1-8, 10 and 12: one from their professional jury and the other from televoting. The Polish jury consisted of Viki Gabor, who won the 2019 junior contest for Poland, Wiktoria Kida, Stasiek Kukulski, Filip Kuncewicz, Jasiek Piwowarczyk, Eliza Orzechowska and Maurycy Żółtański. In the first semi-final, Poland placed second with 247 points, receiving maximum twelve points in the jury vote from Belgium, Germany, Greece, Israel and Lithuania. In the final, Poland placed twelfth with 150 points, receiving twelve points in the jury vote from Austria, Belgium, Germany and Moldova. Over the course of the contest, Poland awarded its 12 points to Belgium (jury) and Moldova (televote) in the first semi-final, and to Israel (jury) and Ukraine (televote) in the final.

The spokesperson for the Polish jury at the final was Aleksandra Budka.

==== Points awarded to Poland ====
Points awarded to Poland (Semi-final 1)
Score	Televote	Jury
12 points		Belgium; Germany; Greece; Israel; Lithuania
10 points	Germany; Lithuania; Moldova	Estonia; Moldova; Portugal; Sweden
8 points	Belgium; Rest of the World; Sweden	Croatia; Italy; Serbia
7 points	Croatia	Finland
6 points	Greece; Israel; Italy; Montenegro; Portugal; San Marino	
5 points		
4 points	Estonia; Serbia	
3 points	Georgia	Montenegro
2 points	Finland	Georgia
1 point		San Marino

Points awarded to Poland (Final)
Score	Televote	Jury
12 points		Austria; Belgium; Germany; Moldova
10 points		Greece; Lithuania
8 points		Australia; Latvia; Switzerland
7 points		
6 points		Finland; Italy; Portugal
5 points	United Kingdom	Czechia; Estonia; United Kingdom
4 points	Germany	
3 points	Lithuania	
2 points	Italy; Sweden	Croatia; Georgia
1 point	Rest of the World	Armenia; Malta; Montenegro; Serbia

==== Points awarded by Poland ====
Points awarded by Poland (Semi-final 1)
Score	Televote	Jury
12 points	Moldova	Belgium
10 points	Serbia	Israel
8 points	Israel	Portugal
7 points	Finland	Serbia
6 points	Montenegro	Lithuania
5 points	Lithuania	Finland
4 points	Croatia	Greece
3 points	Estonia	Sweden
2 points	Greece	Croatia
1 point	Sweden	Moldova

Points awarded by Poland (Final)
Score	Televote	Jury
12 points	Ukraine	Israel
10 points	Romania	Bulgaria
8 points	Moldova	Greece
7 points	Bulgaria	Australia
6 points	Finland	Belgium
5 points	Australia	Romania
4 points	Czechia	Czechia
3 points	Denmark	Norway
2 points	Israel	Italy
1 point	Serbia	Ukraine

==== Detailed voting results ====
Each participating broadcaster assembles a seven-member jury panel consisting of music industry professionals who are citizens of the country they represent. Each jury, and individual jury member, is required to meet a strict set of criteria regarding professional background, as well as diversity in gender and age. No member of a national jury was permitted to be related in any way to any of the competing acts in such a way that they cannot vote impartially and independently. The individual rankings of each jury member as well as the nation's televoting results were released shortly after the grand final.

The following members comprised the Polish jury:

- Viki Gabor
- Wiktoria Kida
- Stasiek Kukulski
- Filip Kuncewicz
- Jasiek Piwowarczyk
- Eliza Orzechowska
- Maurycy Żółtański

Detailed voting results from Poland (Semi-final 1)
R/O	Country	Jury									Televote	
R/O	Country	Juror A	Juror B	Juror C	Juror D	Juror E	Juror F	Juror G	Rank	Points	Rank	Points
01	Moldova	7	6	8	11	3	3	13	10	1	1	12
02	Sweden	3	7	12	2	14	4	10	8	3	10	1
03	Croatia	5	3	9	5	8	5	11	9	2	7	4
04	Greece	1	8	11	1	7	14	14	7	4	9	2
05	Portugal	14	1	7	4	10	1	9	3	8	13	
06	Georgia	8	13	4	7	13	10	7	12		14	
07	Finland	2	4	5	8	6	11	8	6	5	4	7
08	Montenegro	13	12	13	9	11	13	12	14		5	6
09	Estonia	11	9	6	13	9	9	6	13		8	3
10	Israel	4	11	1	10	5	12	1	2	10	3	8
11	Belgium	6	2	2	3	4	8	5	1	12	11	
12	Lithuania	9	5	10	6	2	6	4	5	6	6	5
13	San Marino	12	14	14	14	12	2	3	11		12	
14	Poland											
15	Serbia	10	10	3	12	1	7	2	4	7	2	10

Detailed voting results from Poland (Final)
R/O	Country	Jury									Televote	
R/O	Country	E. Orzechowska	F. Kuncewicz	V. Gabor	S. Kukulski	W. Kida	J. Piwowarczyk	M. Żółtański	Rank	Points	Rank	Points
01	Denmark	5	15	15	8	7	14	11	14		8	3
02	Germany	19	14	17	11	10	15	20	23		23	
03	Israel	3	5	24	1	2	2	7	1	12	9	2
04	Belgium	6	21	16	6	9	1	8	5	6	22	
05	Albania	16	8	14	13	4	5	17	13		15	
06	Greece	2	12	22	2	17	6	5	3	8	12	
07	Ukraine	12	13	6	18	11	7	3	10	1	1	12
08	Australia	1	1	13	12	14	21	18	4	7	6	5
09	Serbia	22	11	21	19	22	23	2	20		10	1
10	Malta	10	16	8	14	8	20	14	22		17	
11	Czechia	9	22	18	15	1	4	16	7	4	7	4
12	Bulgaria	17	2	11	5	5	19	1	2	10	4	7
13	Croatia	11	3	19	24	16	10	10	15		11	
14	United Kingdom	23	24	20	20	21	17	23	24		21	
15	France	13	4	9	16	15	18	19	19		18	
16	Moldova	18	6	7	21	12	24	15	21		3	8
17	Finland	4	10	12	4	19	12	13	11		5	6
18	Poland											
19	Lithuania	21	7	23	22	23	11	4	18		19	
20	Sweden	8	9	10	7	20	13	22	17		16	
21	Cyprus	24	18	2	17	3	22	24	12		20	
22	Italy	14	23	1	23	13	9	6	9	2	13	
23	Norway	7	19	3	10	6	8	21	8	3	14	
24	Romania	15	17	5	3	24	3	12	6	5	2	10
25	Austria	20	20	4	9	18	16	9	16		24	

===== Controversy =====
The Polish jury's decision to award its maximum 12 points in the final to Israel, whose participation in the contest had been a subject of controversy due to the Gaza war, drew criticism domestically. Viewers accused the jurors of disregarding the political and humanitarian context surrounding the conflict, as well as broader concerns regarding Israel's conduct at the contest, and argued that the jury's ranking differed significantly from public sentiment in the country.

Jury members Jasiek Piwowarczyk and Viki Gabor subsequently commented on the result; the former stated he "felt sorry that [his] individual voice also influenced this outcome", while the latter revealed that she ranked Israel 24th (last) in the final. Following a freedom of information request, scans of the jurors' voting cards were published, revealing how each juror ranked every performance in the final. The controversy also resulted in online harassment towards Polish spokesperson Aleksandra Budka, who later revealed that she had received abusive messages, including death threats.
