= Belgium in the Eurovision Song Contest 2026 =

- Eurovision Song Contest 2026
- Participating broadcaster: Radio-télévision belge de la Communauté française (RTBF)
- Country: Belgium
- Selection process: Internal selection
- Announcement date: 19 February 2026

Competing entry
- Song: "Dancing on the Ice"
- Artist: Essyla
- Songwriters: Alice Van Eesbeeck; Barbara Petitjean; Emil Stengele; Nicolas d'Avell

Placement
- Semi-final result: Qualified (10th, 91 points)
- Final result: 21st, 36 points

Participation chronology

Belgium was represented at the Eurovision Song Contest 2026 with the song "Dancing on the Ice", written by Nicolas d'Avell, Alice Van Eesbeeck, Barbara Petitjean, and Emil Stengele, and performed by Van Eesbeeck under her stage name Essyla. The Belgian participating broadcaster, Radio-télévision belge de la Communauté française (RTBF), internally selected its entry for the contest.

== Background ==
Prior to the 2026 contest, Belgium had participated in the Eurovision Song Contest sixty-six times since its debut as one of seven countries to take part in 1956, only missing the 1994, 1997, and 2001 editions. Since then, the country has won the contest on one occasion in 1986 with the song "J'aime la vie", performed by Sandra Kim. Following the introduction of semi-finals for 2004, Belgium had featured in nine finals. In 2025, "Strobe Lights" by Red Sebastian failed to qualify for the final.

The Belgian participation in the contest alternates between two broadcasters: Flemish Vlaamse Radio- en Televisieomroeporganisatie (VRT) and French-speaking Radio-télévision belge de la Communauté française (RTBF), with both broadcasters sharing broadcasting rights. Both broadcasters and their predecessors had selected the Belgian entries using national finals and internal selections in the past. In 2024, RTBF opted for an internal selection, while in 2025 VRT organised a national final. This year's participation was organized by RTBF. Initially on 7 July RTBF confirmed participation, however on 10 July 2025 it was announced participation was undecided as talks were continuing with the EBU but the selection process would continue. After the General Assembly on 4 December, RTBF confirmed participation.

== Before Eurovision ==
=== Internal selection ===
In August 2025, French journalist Clément Garin reported that RTBF had selected Loïc Nottet to represent Belgium in the 2026 contest. Nottet previously represented Belgium in 2015 and was said to have been selected from among 40 longlisted artists, including Henri PFR, Mentissa (who placed third in Eurosong 2025) and Essyla, who reportedly made the final shortlist alongside Nottet with an "English-language pop song"; the rumours were denied by RTBF, and it was later reported that Nottet had withdrawn due to Israel's continued participation in the contest.

On 12 February 2026, RTBF announced that it would reveal the selected artist and song on 19 February. The selected entrant was Essyla with the song "Dancing on the Ice".

=== Calls for boycott ===
On 17 February 2026, the trade union at RTBF and VRT, namely "Centrale générale des services publics (CGSP)" in French and "Algemene Centrale der Openbare Diensten (ACOD)" in Dutch, respectively, called for both broadcasters to withdraw from the contest due to Israel's participation. The union placed wooden figures in the broadcasters' shared building on Reyerslaan, displaying the message "Boycott Eurovision". The union cited the humanitarian situation in Gaza and allegations from the previous year regarding the Israeli government's efforts to encourage voting for the country's entry. An alternative music festival called United for Palestine was held at the La Madeleine concert hall in Brussels on 12 May 2026, the day of the first semi-final. Performers included former Belgian Eurovision entrants Laura Tesoro (2016), Geike Arnaert (2021 as part of Hooverphonic), and Gustaph (2023), along with Palestinian artists such as Nai Barghouti and Bashar Murad.

== At Eurovision ==
The Eurovision Song Contest 2026 took place at the Wiener Stadthalle in Vienna, Austria, and consisted of two semi-finals held on the respective dates of 12 and 14 May and the final on 16 May 2026. All nations with the exceptions of the host country and the "Big Four" (France, Germany, Italy and the United Kingdom) were required to qualify from one of two semi-finals in order to compete for the final; the top ten countries from each semi-final progressed to the final. On 12 January 2026, an allocation draw was held to determine which of the two semi-finals, as well as which half of the show, each country performed in; the European Broadcasting Union (EBU) split up the competing countries into different pots based on voting patterns from previous contests, with countries with favourable voting histories put into the same pot.

=== Performance ===
Essyla was joined by four dancers on stage.

=== Semi final ===
Belgium was allocated for the first semi-final, and later, was announced to perform in position one during the show. Shortly after, the qualification–announcement segment took place, and, at the end of the segment Belgium was announced as one of the ten qualifiers, therefore, Belgium would move on onto the final, after missing 2024 and 2025.

=== Final ===
Belgium performed in the first half of the final and placed 21st.

=== Voting ===
==== Points awarded to Belgium ====
Points awarded to Belgium (Semi-final 1)
| Score | Televote | Jury |
|---|---|---|
| 12 points | | Finland; Italy; Poland |
| 10 points | | |
| 8 points | | Estonia; Israel |
| 7 points | | Sweden |
| 6 points | | Moldova |
| 5 points | | |
| 4 points | Israel | Portugal; Serbia |
| 3 points | | Croatia; Germany |
| 2 points | Georgia | Montenegro |
| 1 point | Finland; Moldova; Montenegro; Rest of the World | |

Points awarded to Belgium (Final)
| Score | Televote | Jury |
|---|---|---|
| 12 points | | Italy |
| 10 points | | Latvia |
| 8 points | | |
| 7 points | | |
| 6 points | | Poland |
| 5 points | | |
| 4 points | | Finland |
| 3 points | | |
| 2 points | | Estonia; Israel |
| 1 point | | |

==== Points awarded by Belgium ====
Points awarded by Belgium (Semi-final 1)
| Score | Televote | Jury |
|---|---|---|
| 12 points | Moldova | Poland |
| 10 points | Israel | Sweden |
| 8 points | Poland | Israel |
| 7 points | Greece | Croatia |
| 6 points | Finland | Finland |
| 5 points | Croatia | Portugal |
| 4 points | Portugal | Lithuania |
| 3 points | Serbia | Estonia |
| 2 points | Lithuania | Greece |
| 1 point | Estonia | Moldova |

Points awarded by Belgium (Final)
| Score | Televote | Jury |
|---|---|---|
| 12 points | Bulgaria | Poland |
| 10 points | Romania | Australia |
| 8 points | Israel | Finland |
| 7 points | Moldova | Norway |
| 6 points | Greece | Italy |
| 5 points | Ukraine | France |
| 4 points | Italy | Bulgaria |
| 3 points | Finland | Albania |
| 2 points | Albania | Germany |
| 1 point | Australia | Israel |

==== Detailed voting results ====
Each participating broadcaster assembles a seven-member jury panel consisting of music industry professionals who are citizens of the country they represent and two of which have to be between 18 and 25 years old. Each jury, and individual jury member, is required to meet a strict set of criteria regarding professional background, as well as diversity in gender and age. No member of a national jury was permitted to be related in any way to any of the competing acts in such a way that they cannot vote impartially and independently. The individual rankings of each jury member as well as the nation's televoting results were released shortly after the grand final.

The following members comprised the Belgian jury:

- Anthony Marsala
- Nicolas Beckers
- Rino Gallo
- Yoann Frédéric
- Elia Fragione
- Lejla Burazerović
- Lou-Marine Vanden Abeelen

Detailed voting results from Belgium (Semi-final 1)
| R/O | Country | Jury | | | | | | | | | Televote | |
| R/O | Country | Juror A | Juror B | Juror C | Juror D | Juror E | Juror F | Juror G | Rank | Points | Rank | Points |
|---|---|---|---|---|---|---|---|---|---|---|---|---|
| 01 | Moldova | 13 | 4 | 6 | 6 | 13 | 9 | 9 | 10 | 1 | 1 | 12 |
| 02 | Sweden | 3 | 8 | 3 | 5 | 3 | 5 | 2 | 2 | 10 | 12 | |
| 03 | Croatia | 8 | 3 | 4 | 13 | 6 | 6 | 4 | 4 | 7 | 6 | 5 |
| 04 | Greece | 10 | 2 | 9 | 11 | 5 | 10 | 10 | 9 | 2 | 4 | 7 |
| 05 | Portugal | 2 | 13 | 11 | 3 | 12 | 3 | 8 | 6 | 5 | 7 | 4 |
| 06 | Georgia | 14 | 12 | 14 | 8 | 14 | 14 | 13 | 14 | | 13 | |
| 07 | Finland | 6 | 7 | 5 | 4 | 11 | 4 | 5 | 5 | 6 | 5 | 6 |
| 08 | Montenegro | 7 | 9 | 10 | 12 | 4 | 12 | 7 | 11 | | 14 | |
| 09 | Estonia | 9 | 11 | 7 | 10 | 7 | 2 | 6 | 8 | 3 | 10 | 1 |
| 10 | Israel | 4 | 14 | 2 | 2 | 2 | 7 | 14 | 3 | 8 | 2 | 10 |
| 11 | Belgium | | | | | | | | | | | |
| 12 | Lithuania | 5 | 5 | 8 | 9 | 9 | 8 | 3 | 7 | 4 | 9 | 2 |
| 13 | San Marino | 11 | 10 | 13 | 7 | 8 | 11 | 12 | 12 | | 11 | |
| 14 | Poland | 1 | 1 | 1 | 1 | 1 | 1 | 1 | 1 | 12 | 3 | 8 |
| 15 | Serbia | 12 | 6 | 12 | 14 | 10 | 13 | 11 | 13 | | 8 | 3 |

Detailed voting results from Belgium (Final)
| R/O | Country | Jury | | | | | | | | | Televote | |
| R/O | Country | Juror A | Juror B | Juror C | Juror D | Juror E | Juror F | Juror G | Rank | Points | Rank | Points |
|---|---|---|---|---|---|---|---|---|---|---|---|---|
| 01 | Denmark | 13 | 9 | 7 | 10 | 16 | 14 | 17 | 16 | | 15 | |
| 02 | Germany | 14 | 8 | 10 | 14 | 4 | 6 | 7 | 9 | 2 | 22 | |
| 03 | Israel | 3 | 24 | 17 | 17 | 5 | 24 | 4 | 10 | 1 | 3 | 8 |
| 04 | Belgium | | | | | | | | | | | |
| 05 | Albania | 22 | 3 | 2 | 20 | 13 | 10 | 16 | 8 | 3 | 9 | 2 |
| 06 | Greece | 16 | 22 | 22 | 21 | 15 | 12 | 21 | 22 | | 5 | 6 |
| 07 | Ukraine | 10 | 14 | 5 | 3 | 14 | 22 | 18 | 12 | | 6 | 5 |
| 08 | Australia | 9 | 6 | 3 | 5 | 10 | 3 | 3 | 2 | 10 | 10 | 1 |
| 09 | Serbia | 21 | 20 | 23 | 18 | 24 | 8 | 22 | 21 | | 21 | |
| 10 | Malta | 7 | 12 | 11 | 15 | 11 | 21 | 19 | 17 | | 16 | |
| 11 | Czechia | 8 | 13 | 9 | 11 | 9 | 9 | 12 | 14 | | 18 | |
| 12 | Bulgaria | 6 | 11 | 21 | 2 | 17 | 5 | 11 | 7 | 4 | 1 | 12 |
| 13 | Croatia | 17 | 4 | 12 | 12 | 22 | 7 | 8 | 13 | | 13 | |
| 14 | United Kingdom | 23 | 23 | 24 | 24 | 18 | 23 | 24 | 24 | | 23 | |
| 15 | France | 1 | 2 | 14 | 19 | 12 | 18 | 13 | 6 | 5 | 11 | |
| 16 | Moldova | 24 | 21 | 20 | 16 | 8 | 17 | 15 | 20 | | 4 | 7 |
| 17 | Finland | 19 | 7 | 6 | 7 | 2 | 4 | 2 | 3 | 8 | 8 | 3 |
| 18 | Poland | 4 | 1 | 1 | 1 | 1 | 1 | 1 | 1 | 12 | 12 | |
| 19 | Lithuania | 18 | 17 | 16 | 4 | 23 | 15 | 20 | 18 | | 20 | |
| 20 | Sweden | 12 | 10 | 8 | 8 | 19 | 13 | 14 | 15 | | 17 | |
| 21 | Cyprus | 11 | 15 | 19 | 23 | 6 | 2 | 10 | 11 | | 14 | |
| 22 | Italy | 5 | 5 | 13 | 6 | 3 | 16 | 9 | 5 | 6 | 7 | 4 |
| 23 | Norway | 2 | 16 | 4 | 13 | 7 | 11 | 5 | 4 | 7 | 19 | |
| 24 | Romania | 15 | 18 | 18 | 9 | 21 | 19 | 6 | 19 | | 2 | 10 |
| 25 | Austria | 20 | 19 | 15 | 22 | 20 | 20 | 23 | 23 | | 24 | |
