= Ukraine in the Eurovision Song Contest 2026 =

- Eurovision Song Contest 2026
- Participating broadcaster: Public Broadcasting Company of Ukraine (Suspilne)
- Country: Ukraine
- Selection process: Vidbir 2026
- Selection date: 7 February 2026

Competing entry
- Song: "Ridnym"
- Artist: Leléka
- Songwriters: Adama Cefalu; Jakob Hegner; Viktoriia Leleka; Yaroslav Dzhus

Placement
- Semi-final result: Qualified (6th, 174 points)
- Final result: 9th, 221 points

Participation chronology

Ukraine was represented at the Eurovision Song Contest 2026 with the song "Ridnym", written by Adama Cefalu, Jakob Hegner, Viktoriia Leleka and Yaroslav Dzhus, and performed by Leleka under her stage name Leléka. The Ukrainian participating broadcaster, Suspilne, organised the national final Vidbir 2026 in order to select its entry for the contest.

== Background ==
Prior to the 2026 contest, the National Television Company of Ukraine (NTU) until 2016, and Suspilne since 2017, had participated in the Eurovision Song Contest representing Ukraine 20 times since NTU's first entry in 2003. It had won the contest on three occasions: in 2004 with the song "Wild Dances" performed by Ruslana, in 2016 with "1944" by Jamala, and in 2022 with the song "Stefania" performed by Kalush Orchestra. It had been the runner-up in the contest on two occasions: in 2007 with the song "Dancing Lasha Tumbai" performed by Verka Serduchka and in 2008 with the song "Shady Lady" performed by Ani Lorak. Following the introduction of semi-finals in 2004, Ukraine had managed to qualify to final in every contest it participated in thus far. Its least successful result had been 24th place, which was achieved in 2017 with the song "Time" performed by O.Torvald. In 2025, "Bird of Pray" performed by Ziferblat placed ninth.

As part of its duties as participating broadcaster, Suspilne organises the selection of its entry in the Eurovision Song Contest and broadcasts the event in the country. Suspilne confirmed its intentions to participate at the 2026 contest on 25 August 2025. In the past, the broadcaster had alternated between both internal selections and national finals in order to select its entry. Between 2022 and 2024, Suspilne had set up national finals with several artists to choose both the song and performer to compete at Eurovision, with both the public and a panel of jury members involved in the selection. The method is expected to be continued to select its 2026 entry.

== Before Eurovision ==
=== Vidbir 2026 ===
Vidbir 2026 was the tenth edition of Vidbir, the national final to select the Ukrainian entry for the Eurovision Song Contest 2026. The competition took place on 7 February 2026.

==== Format ====
The selection of the competing entries for the national final and ultimately the Ukrainian Eurovision entry will take place over three stages. In the first stage, artists and songwriters had the opportunity to apply for the competition through an online submission form. 15 acts were longlisted and announced on 24 November 2025. The second stage involved the longlisted artists attending a scheduled audition, during which nine acts were selected and announced on 3 December 2025. An additional act was selected from an online selection via the Diia mobile application. The third stage is the final, which took place on 7 February 2026 and featured the ten acts vying to represent Ukraine in Vienna, with the results based on the 50/50 combination of votes from the public (via Diia) and a five-member jury panel (a larger one than in previous editions), with each juror assessing a different aspect of the performances while formulating their scores.

The jury panel that voted during the show consisted of:

- Ruslana – singer, winner of the 2004 contest
- Zlata Ognevich – singer-songwriter, represented Ukraine in 2013
- Yevhen Filatov – singer and composer
- Vitaliy Drozdov – general producer of TAVR Media Radio Holding
- Kostyantyn Tomilchenko – choreographer

==== Competing entries ====
Artists and composers had the opportunity to submit their entries via an online submission form which accepted entries between 3 September 2025 and 27 October 2025. Only artists that had not performed in events organized by/located in the territory of "the aggressor state" or illegally entered the territories of Crimea since 15 March 2014 and Belarus since 24 February 2022, respectively, were allowed to apply for the competition, and songs performed in the "language of the aggressor state" were prohibited. Jamala, who won the 2016 contest for Ukraine, was assigned as the new music producer of the competition and was the lead in reviewing the 451 received submissions. 15 entries were longlisted, of which their artists were announced on 24 November 2025. Auditions were held on 26 November 2025 where nine entries were shortlisted to compete in the national final. On 3 December 2025, the nine selected competing acts were announced. The online selection, featuring the six non-qualifying entries from the auditions, was held between 8 and 13 January 2026. The winner, Khayat, was announced on 13 January.

Among the competing artists were Monokate, who had represented Ukraine in 2021 as part of Go_A, and Jerry Heil, who had represented Ukraine in 2024 alongside Alyona Alyona. Olena Usenko, a member of the Elliens, had represented Ukraine in Junior Eurovision 2021.

Longlisted artists
- Anstay
- Jerry Heil
- Karyotype
- Khayat
- Laud
- Leléka
- Marta Adamchuk
- Molodi
- Mon Fia
- Monokate
- Mr. Vel
- Oks
- ShchukaRybа
- The Elliens
- Valeriya Force

Online wildcard – 13 January 2026
R/O	Artist	Song	Songwriter(s)	Votes	Place
1	Khayat	"Hertsy" (Герци)	Andrii Khaiat; Aniel Arin	91,758	1
2	Karyotype	"DNA"	Danylo Kuka	36,354	4
3	Mon Fia	"Do You Hear Me?"	Hannes Volz; Michael Fischer; Sofiia Semeniuk	49,004	2
4	Anstay	"By the Way"	Anastasiia Palamar; Leonid Zvarych	29,929	6
5	Marta Adamchuk	"Silvered Pines"	Iryna Zuienok; Marta Adamchuk; Oleksandra Makarovska; Volodymyr Sharykov	43,494	3
6	Oks	"Say It All"	Ivan Klymenko; Kateryna Medvedieva; Serhii Yermolaiev; Stanislav Chornyi; Vitalii Oks	32,621	5

Vidbir 2026 participating entries
Artist	Song	Songwriter(s)
Jerry Heil	"Catharticus (Prayer)"	Denys Sokolov; Joy Deb; Linnea Deb; Yana Shemaieva
Khayat	"Hertsy" (Герци)	Andrii Khaiat; Aniel Arin
Laud	"Lightkeeper"	Diana Tomniuk; DredLock; Vladyslav Karashchuk
Leléka	"Ridnym" (Рідним)	Adama Cefalu; Jakob Hegner; Viktoriia Leleka; Yaroslav Dzhus
Molodi	"Legends"	Anton Chilibi; Iryna Batiuk; Ivan Stepanishchev; Kyrylo Rohovyi; Mykyta Leontiev
Monokate	"Tut" (Тут)	Artem Yefimov; Kateryna Pavlenko
Mr. Vel	"Do or Done"	Aniel Arin; Valerii Miroshnychenko
ShchukaRybа	"Moia zemlia" (Моя земля)	Daria Lisich; Yaroslav Tatarchenko
The Elliens	"Crawling Whispers"	Aniel Arin; Mykyta Fyodorov; Olena Usenko; Stanyslav Khmel
Valeriya Force	"Open Our Hearts"	Valeriia Simulik; Vinny Venditto

==== Final ====
The final took place on 7 February 2026. In addition to the competing entries, guest performers included former Ukrainian Eurovision entrants Ziferblat (2025), Zlata Ognevich (2013), Tvorchi (2023), and Jamala, as well as Satoshi, who would represent Moldova in 2026, and Svitlana Tarabarova with three former Ukrainian Junior Eurovision participants: Anastasia Dymyd (2023), Artem Kotenko (2024), and Sofiia Nersesian (2025).

Final – 7 February 2026
R/O	Artist	Song	Jury	Public vote				Total	Place
R/O	Artist	Song	Jury	Diia				Total	Place
R/O	Artist	Song	Jury	Diia	SMS	Total	Points	Total	Place
1	Valeriya Force	"Open Our Hearts"	4	7,928	643	8,571	2	6	9
2	Molodi	"Legends"	2	12,400	1,115	13,515	4	6	8
3	Monokate	"Tut"	6	11,963	939	12,902	3	9	6
4	The Elliens	"Crawling Whispers"	1	14,363	1,640	16,003	5	6	7
5	Laud	"Lightkeeper"	9	35,189	2,674	37,863	9	18	2
6	Leléka	"Ridnym"	10	54,830	5,220	60,050	10	20	1
7	Mr. Vel	"Do or Done"	7	15,809	1,713	17,522	6	13	4
8	Khayat	"Hertsy"	5	17,144	1,863	19,007	7	12	5
9	Jerry Heil	"Catharticus (Prayer)"	8	33,034	2,687	35,721	8	16	3
10	ShchukaRybа	"Moia zemlia"	3	5,731	715	6,446	1	4	10

== At Eurovision ==
The Eurovision Song Contest 2026 took place at the Wiener Stadthalle in Vienna, Austria, and consisted of two semi-finals held on the respective dates of 12 and 14 May and the final on 16 May 2026. All nations with the exceptions of the host country and the "Big Four" (France, Germany, Italy and the United Kingdom) were required to qualify from one of two semi-finals in order to compete for the final; the top ten countries from each semi-final progressed to the final. On 12 January 2026, an allocation draw was held to determine which of the two semi-finals, as well as which half of the show, each country performed in; the European Broadcasting Union (EBU) split up the competing countries into different pots based on voting patterns from previous contests, with countries with favourable voting histories put into the same pot. Ukraine was scheduled for the second half of the second semi-final.

=== Voting ===
==== Points awarded to Ukraine ====
Points awarded to Ukraine (Semi-final 2)
Score	Televote	Jury
12 points	Latvia	
10 points	Czechia	France; Switzerland
8 points	Denmark; France; Rest of the World	Azerbaijan
7 points	Cyprus; Luxembourg	Latvia
6 points	Norway; Switzerland	Romania; United Kingdom
5 points	Albania; Austria; Romania	Bulgaria
4 points	Bulgaria; United Kingdom	Luxembourg; Malta
3 points		Austria; Cyprus; Czechia; Norway
2 points	Azerbaijan; Malta	Denmark
1 point		Albania

Points awarded to Ukraine (Final)
Score	Televote	Jury
12 points	Czechia; Georgia; Poland	Switzerland
10 points	Moldova; Portugal	Azerbaijan
8 points	Estonia; Rest of the World	
7 points	Albania; Bulgaria; Denmark; Lithuania	Italy; Latvia; United Kingdom
6 points	France; Italy	France
5 points	Belgium; Latvia; Montenegro; Sweden	
4 points	Austria; Azerbaijan; Cyprus; Finland; Israel; Luxembourg; Romania	
3 points		Portugal
2 points	Germany; Norway; United Kingdom	
1 point	Croatia	Poland; Romania

==== Points awarded by Ukraine ====
Points awarded by Ukraine (Semi-final 2)
Score	Televote	Jury
12 points	Romania	Malta
10 points	Norway	Czechia
8 points	Switzerland	Switzerland
7 points	Denmark	Luxembourg
6 points	Albania	Romania
5 points	Czechia	Australia
4 points	Bulgaria	Denmark
3 points	Luxembourg	Latvia
2 points	Malta	Norway
1 point	Australia	Armenia

Points awarded by Ukraine (Final)
Score	Televote	Jury
12 points	Moldova	Malta
10 points	Romania	Israel
8 points	Croatia	Moldova
7 points	Denmark	Czechia
6 points	Norway	Finland
5 points	Israel	France
4 points	Bulgaria	Italy
3 points	Serbia	Romania
2 points	Finland	Australia
1 point	Czechia	United Kingdom

==== Detailed voting results ====
Each participating broadcaster assembles a seven-member jury panel consisting of music industry professionals who are citizens of the country they represent and two of which have to be between 18 and 25 years old. Each jury, and individual jury member, is required to meet a strict set of criteria regarding professional background, as well as diversity in gender and age. No member of a national jury was permitted to be related in any way to any of the competing acts in such a way that they cannot vote impartially and independently. The individual rankings of each jury member as well as the nation's televoting results were released shortly after the grand final.

The following members comprised the Ukrainian jury:

- Ihor Kyrylenko
- Valentyn Leshchynskyi (represented Ukraine in the Eurovision Song Contest 2025 as part of Ziferblat)
- Valerii Kharchyshyn
- Yevhen Kot
- Hanna Svyrydovych
- Solomiia Opryshko
- Viktoriia Slobodska

Detailed voting results from Ukraine (Semi-final 2)
R/O	Country	Jury									Televote	
R/O	Country	Juror A	Juror B	Juror C	Juror D	Juror E	Juror F	Juror G	Rank	Points	Rank	Points
01	Bulgaria	13	9	13	13	14	14	11	13		7	4
02	Azerbaijan	11	13	14	14	11	12	14	14		14	
03	Romania	7	6	5	3	7	7	4	5	6	1	12
04	Luxembourg	5	4	4	5	3	6	13	4	7	8	3
05	Czechia	2	2	3	7	1	3	1	2	10	6	5
06	Armenia	8	8	10	12	6	4	10	10	1	12	
07	Switzerland	4	7	11	4	4	2	6	3	8	3	8
08	Cyprus	14	10	8	10	13	11	8	12		13	
09	Latvia	6	14	2	9	5	8	12	8	3	11	
10	Denmark	10	5	9	6	9	5	3	7	4	4	7
11	Australia	3	3	7	8	8	9	5	6	5	10	1
12	Ukraine											
13	Albania	12	12	6	11	12	13	9	11		5	6
14	Malta	1	1	1	1	2	1	2	1	12	9	2
15	Norway	9	11	12	2	10	10	7	9	2	2	10

Detailed voting results from Ukraine (Final)
R/O	Country	Jury									Televote	
R/O	Country	Juror A	Juror B	Juror C	Juror D	Juror E	Juror F	Juror G	Rank	Points	Rank	Points
01	Denmark	17	5	10	11	17	7	14	12		4	7
02	Germany	23	22	13	24	20	18	17	21		23	
03	Israel	7	2	1	2	2	1	4	2	10	6	5
04	Belgium	13	8	14	15	10	21	15	14		22	
05	Albania	6	21	20	20	16	16	18	17		15	
06	Greece	22	13	21	7	19	6	8	13		17	
07	Ukraine											
08	Australia	14	12	15	12	5	13	5	9	2	16	
09	Serbia	18	17	23	23	22	22	22	23		8	3
10	Malta	1	3	2	1	3	3	1	1	12	18	
11	Czechia	11	1	3	6	6	9	12	4	7	10	1
12	Bulgaria	19	19	24	21	23	15	21	22		7	4
13	Croatia	16	15	18	13	21	24	13	20		3	8
14	United Kingdom	5	9	7	19	13	12	16	10	1	20	
15	France	10	16	6	9	1	2	11	6	5	12	
16	Moldova	2	7	4	3	14	10	2	3	8	1	12
17	Finland	4	11	8	4	4	4	9	5	6	9	2
18	Poland	8	20	16	18	8	14	20	16		14	
19	Lithuania	15	6	5	17	11	23	10	11		11	
20	Sweden	12	18	17	14	15	19	6	15		19	
21	Cyprus	21	23	19	10	24	8	24	19		24	
22	Italy	3	4	9	5	7	11	7	7	4	13	
23	Norway	20	14	11	16	9	17	23	18		5	6
24	Romania	9	10	12	8	12	5	3	8	3	2	10
25	Austria	24	24	22	22	18	20	19	24		21	
