= Leléka =

Ukrainian-German jazz band

- Origin: Berlin, Germany
- Genres: Folk jazz, jazz fusion, jazz
- Years active: 2016–present
- Label: GLM
- Members: Viktoria Leléka; Thomas Kolarczyk; Jakob Hegner; Povel Widestrand
- Past members: Robert Wienröder
- Website: www.leleka.de

Leléka is a Ukrainian-German folk jazz ensemble founded in Berlin in 2016. The band is known for its unique style, combining Ukrainian folklore with modern jazz and elements of improvisation.

== Career ==
Leléka was founded by Ukrainian singer and songwriter Viktoria Leléka in the spring of 2016 in Berlin. The first line-up of the band, in addition to Leléka herself, included pianist Robert Wienröder, double bassist Thomas Kolarczyk, and drummer Jakob Hegner. Leléka won the Creole – Global Music Contest in 2017 and the European Young Jazz Talent Award at the Internationale Jazzwoche Burghausen in 2018. They came in second place at the Young Munich Jazz Prize in 2019. Following the self-titled EP Leléka (2017), the quartet, which was also included in Ralf Dombrowski's book "111 Reasons to Love Jazz," released their debut album Tuman in 2019 with Povel Widestrand as the new pianist.

In 2020, Leléka wrote and produced the music for the Ukrainian historical television series There will be people, which aired on the STB. Since 2021, the band has been working with the GLM label and the Musszo booking agency. In September 2021, Leléka released their second album, Sonce u Serci, which was nominated for "Band of the Year" at the Deutscher Jazzpreis the following year.

== Members ==
=== Current ===
- Viktoria Leléka – vocals
- Thomas Kolyarchyk – double bass
- Jakob Hegner – drums
- Povel Widestrand – piano

=== Past ===
- Robert Wienröder – piano

== Discography ==
=== Studio albums ===
Name	Details
Sonce u Serci	Released: 17 September 2021; Label: Fine Music; Format: Digital distribution
Rizdvo	Released: 8 December 2023; Label: Edition Collage; Format: Digital distribution
Kolysanky	Released: 7 March 2025; Label: Edition Collage; Format: Digital distribution

=== Mini albums ===
Name	Details
Leléka	Released: 5 November 2017; Label: Self-released; Format: Digital distribution
Tuman	Released: 14 June 2019; Label: Self-released; Format: Digital distribution

=== Maxi singles ===
Name	Details	Song list
І будуть люди	Released: 16 October 2020; Label: Self-released; Format: Digital distribution	1. "Zozulja"; 2. "Zapizno"
