= Viktoria Leléka =

Ukrainian singer (born 1990)

Viktoria Leléka Вікторія Лелека
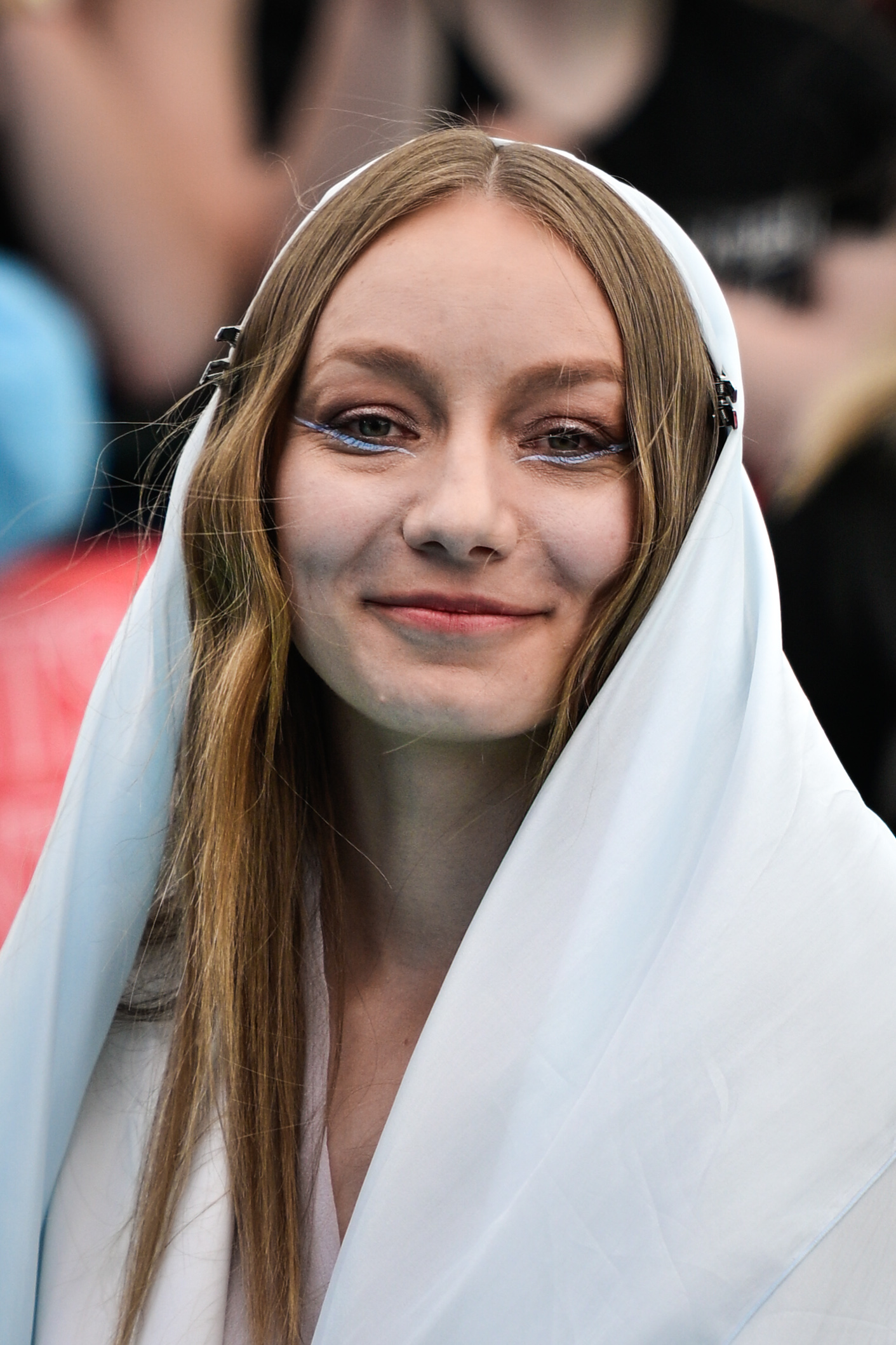
- Leléka in 2026

Background information
- Also known as: Donbasgrl; Leléka
- Born: 10 November 1990 (age 36); Pershotravensk, Ukrainian SSR, Soviet Union
- Genres: Jazz; folk jazz; electronic music
- Occupations: Singer; composer
- Instrument: Vocals
- Years active: 2016–present
- Label: GLM Music
- Member of: Leléka
- Spouse: Sebastiian Anton (m. 2015; div. 2017)
- Website: www.leleka.de

Viktoria Leleka (Ukrainian: Вікторія Лелека; born 10 November 1990), known mononymously as Leléka or Donbasgrl (stylised as DONBA₴GRL), is a Ukrainian singer and composer based in Berlin, Germany. The founder and lead vocalist of the folk jazz band Leléka, she represented Ukraine in the Eurovision Song Contest 2026 with the song "Ridnym".

== Early life and education ==
Leleka was born Viktoriia Mykolaivna Korniikova (Ukrainian: Вікторія Миколаївна Корнійкова) on 10 November 1990 in Pershotravensk, Dnipropetrovsk Oblast, Ukrainian SSR (now Shakhtarske, Ukraine). She received her bachelor's degree in performing arts/acting from the Kyiv National I. K. Karpenko-Kary Theatre, Cinema and Television University. She later studied under Céline Rudolph and earned a second bachelor's degree in jazz vocals, as well as a master's degree in composition at the Hochschule für Musik Carl Maria von Weber in Dresden, Germany.

== Career ==
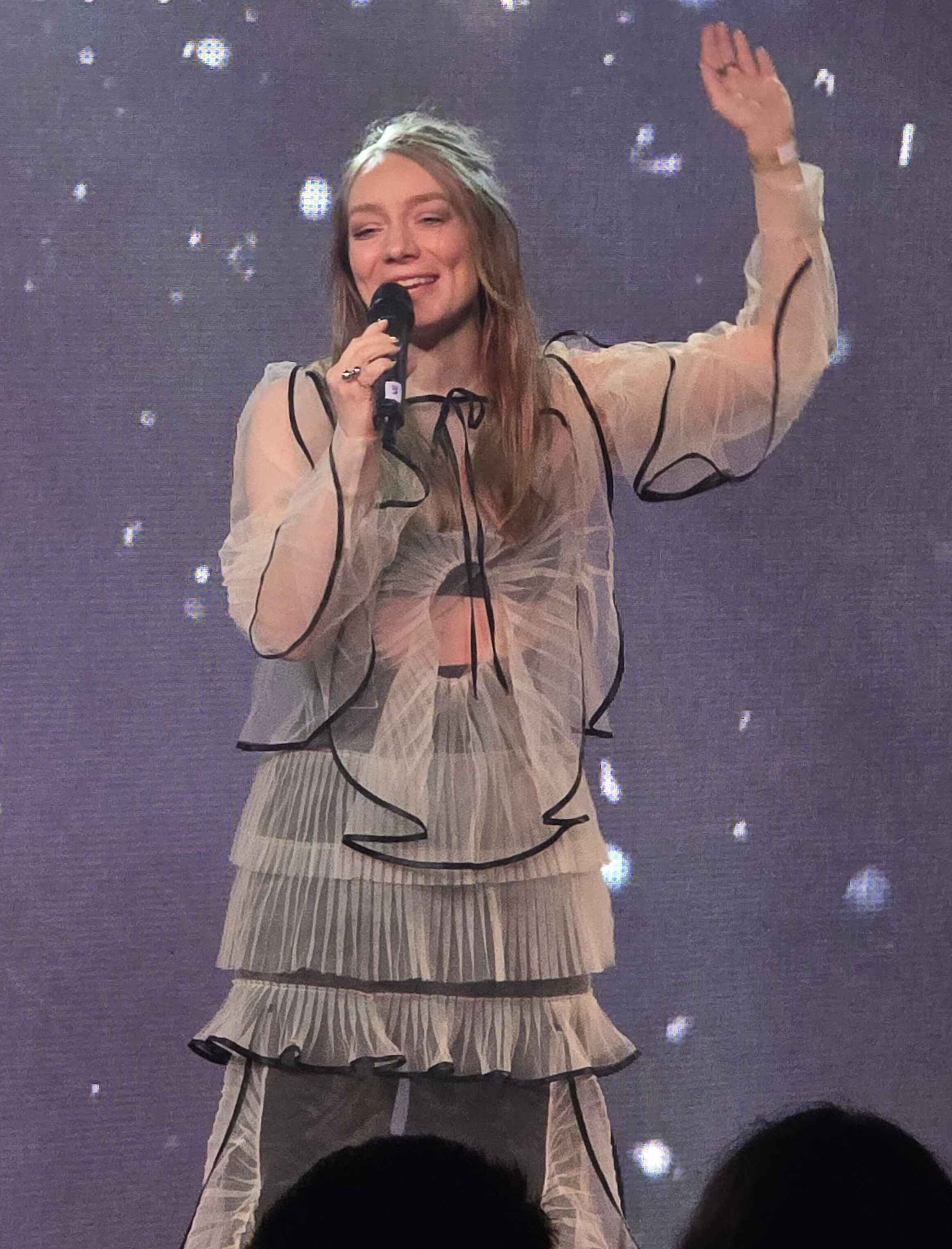
Leléka performing at Eurovision Pre-party in London, 2026

Leléka sang in the Berlin choir Young Voices Brandenburg and with the Big Band Flinstones in Berlin. She was a prize winner at the StuVo Jazz Contest 2016 (Berlin) in the category “unusual interpretation of a jazz standard” and received a scholarship for the International Vocal Jazz Camp of the New York Voices.

In 2016, Leléka founded the folk jazz band Leléka in Berlin with Robert Wienröder, Thomas Kolarczyk and Jakob Hegner. With the group, Leléka won the Creole – Global Music Contest in 2017 and the European Young Jazz Talent Award at the Internationale Jazzwoche Burghausen in 2018; she came in second place at the Young Munich Jazz Prize in 2019. Roland Spiegel particularly praised her "voice with aura and a bright, soft sound full of captivating natural power."

Following the self-titled EP Leléka (2017), Leléka's band, which was also included in Ralf Dombrowski's book 111 Reasons to Love Jazz, released their debut album Tuman in 2019 with Povel Widestrand as the new pianist. In September 2021, the band released their second album, Sontse u sertsi, on GLM.

Leléka launched the art-pop and electronic music project Donbasgrl in 2024, debuting with the single "Zbroia", based on a poem by Lesya Ukrainka, accompanied by a music video addressing themes of depression. In 2025, Donbasgrl was selected for the Eurosonic Noorderslag showcase festival in the Netherlands, where she performed a full set developed in collaboration with the German music producer Jakohitsdifferent. The same year, on June 26, she released the single "Zhyva", also produced with Jakohitsdifferent. Later that month, she headlined the Green Futures stage at the Glastonbury Festival in the United Kingdom.

Leléka won Vidbir, the Ukrainian national final for the Eurovision Song Contest 2026, with the song "Ridnym", allowing her to represent Ukraine at the contest.

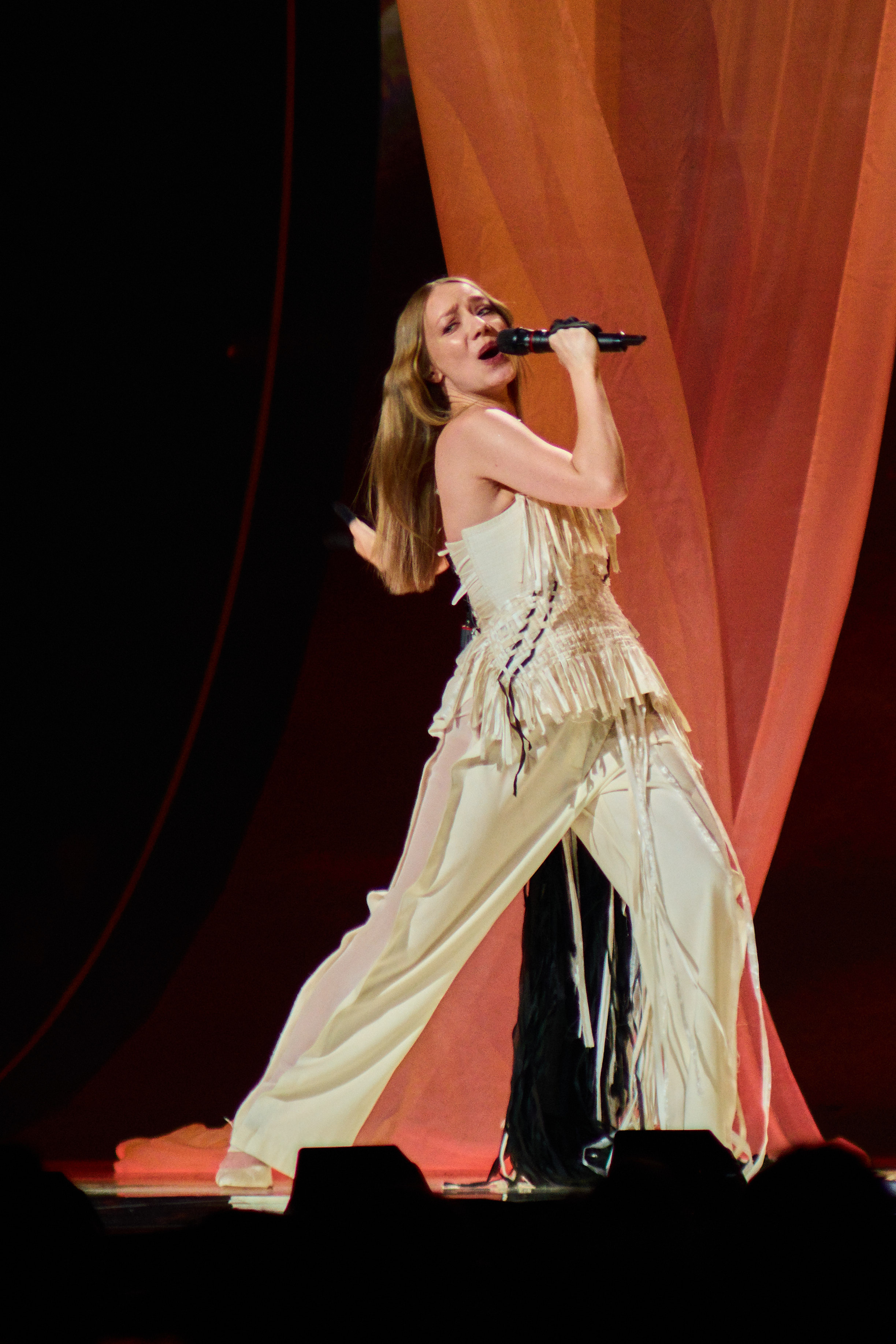
Leléka at Eurovision 2026 second semi-final rehearsal in Vienna.

On March 14, 2026, Leléka released Anima Mundi, an EP made in collaboration with Italian composer Stefano Lentini. The record includes three compositions featured in the sixth season of the Italian series The Sea Beyond.

After qualifying for the final at Eurovision, she placed ninth with 221 points, after placing 6th in the second semi final with 174 points.

== Discography ==
=== Albums ===
==== Extended plays ====
- Anima Mundi (2026)

=== Charted singles ===
Title	Year	Peak chart positions	Album
Title	Year	UKR Air.	Album
"Ridnym"	2026	55	Non-album single

== Activism and public advocacy ==
In May 2026, Leléka joined the charitable fundraising campaign "Dronefall" organized by the Come Back Alive Foundation to support efforts aimed at countering Russian unmanned aerial vehicles over Ukrainian cities. As part of the project, units of the Ukrainian Defence Forces receive pickup trucks, radio communication equipment, generators, and interceptor drones.

Awards and achievements
Preceded by Ziferblat with "Bird of Pray"	Ukraine in the Eurovision Song Contest; 2026	Succeeded by TBD
