= Of Us =

2025 Album by Ziferblat

Studio album by Ziferblat
- Released: 2 May 2025
- Length: 20:44
- Language: English; Ukrainian
- Label: Geisha Ninja Samurai
- Producer: Ziferblat

Ziferblat chronology
Peretvorennya (2023)	Of Us (2025)

Singles from Of Us
- 1. "Place I Call Home" Released: 12 January 2024; 2. "Bird of Pray" Released: 24 January 2025

Of Us is the second studio album by Ukrainian band Ziferblat, and the band's first English-language release. It was released on 2 May 2025 by Geisha Ninja Samurai.

The album features the singles "Place I Call Home", with which the band finished second at Vidbir 2024; and "Bird of Pray", which represented Ukraine at the Eurovision Song Contest 2025 after winning Vidbir 2025.

== Background ==
Ziferblat began working on an English-language studio album immediately after their victory in Vidbir 2025, finishing it in a month after working at an "ultra-fast pace". The album was written, recorded and produced in Kyiv, and it includes their two submissions to Vidbir ("Place I Call Home" and "Bird of Pray"). The album also includes the song "Of Us", which was also considered by the band for Vidbir 2025. The band ended up choosing "Bird of Pray", taking the decision together with Ukrainian singer and former representative at Eurovision Tina Karol.

The band described the album as "simple and even somewhat naive - without unnecessary complications and subtexts", including dance and experimental tracks. It is also seen by the band as "an attempt to bring Ukrainian music to a new level without losing its uniqueness", claiming that it "speaks English, but it sounds [Ziferblat's] way". Ziferblat considers the album to be their "first important attempt to be heard outside of Ukraine".

== Track listing ==
All tracks are written by Valentyn Leshchynskyi, Daniel Leshchynskyi and Fedir Khodakov.

No.	Title	Length
1.	"City"	3:02
2.	"Place I Call Home"	2:58
3.	"Good Boy, Good Girl"	2:56
4.	"Victoria"	2:59
5.	"Of Us"	2:59
6.	"Bird of Pray – Eurovision 2025"	3:01
7.	"Reachin' Out"	2:51
Total length:		20:44

== Charts ==
Chart performance for Of Us
Chart (2025)	Peak position
Lithuanian Albums (AGATA)	39

== Release history ==
Release dates and formats for Of Us
Region	Date	Format(s)	Label	Ref.
Various	2 May 2025	Digital download; streaming	Geisha Ninja Samurai	
