= Lelek =

Lelek may refer to:

- Lelek, Warmian-Masurian Voivodeship, a village in Poland
- Lelek (band), a Croatian pop band
- Željko Lelek (born 1962), Bosnian Serb war criminal

== See also ==
- Leleka
