= Leleka =

Leleka (Ukrainian: Лелека) may refer to:

- Leléka, Ukrainian-German folk jazz ensemble founded in 2016
- Viktoria Leléka (born 1990), Ukrainian singer
- Viktoriya Leleka (born 1973), Ukrainian basketball player
- DeViRo Leleka-100, a Ukrainian unmanned aerial vehicle

== See also ==
- Lelek
