= Joe Viera =

German saxophonist and music educator (1932–2024)

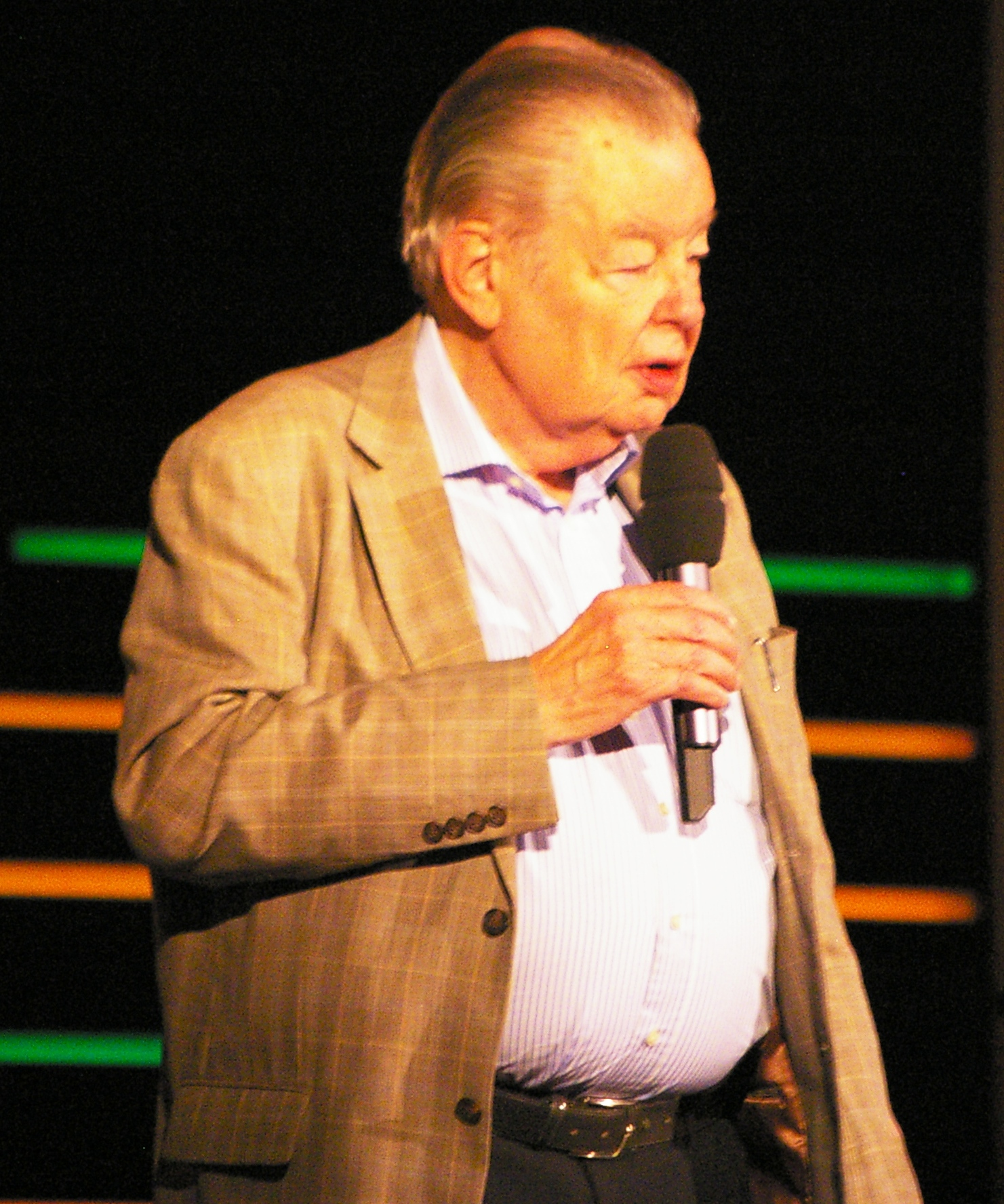
- Viera in 2011

Background information
- Born: Josef Viera; 4 September 1932; Munich, Germany
- Died: 7 April 2024 (aged 91) Munich, Germany
- Genres: Jazz
- Occupation: Instructor
- Instrument: Saxophone
- Years active: 1962–2000

Josef Viera (4 September 1932 – 7 April 2024) was a German jazz saxophonist and educator. In 1970, he founded the German jazz festival Internationale Jazzwoche Burghausen and directed it for more than 50 years. In 1993, Viera co-founded the Lehrer Big Band Bayern (LBB Bayern) with Walter A. Neubeck.

== Biography ==
Viera studied physics at LMU Munich until he graduated, but his heart was set on becoming a jazz musician. He remarked that he "learned how to think from physics and how to feel from music". He attended his first jazz concert in 1952 at the Circus Krone, on the day of his final high school exam. He subsequently bought his first saxophone, a soprano, from a friend from Munich for 70 marks, and formed a band with a guitarist.

Viera worked with the band Hot Dogs from 1955 to 1957, then founded the Riverboat Seven. He played with pianist Erich Ferstl, and Albert Mangelsdorff, and led a trio from 1962 with pianist Ferstl and bassist Manfred Eicher, which gradually evolved from playing modern bebop into free jazz. From 1968, he worked in a quartet with Ed Kröger, Sigi Busch and Heinrich Hock. From 1976, he played in a sextet named after him, including Dieter Ilg, Hannes Clauss and Martin Schrack). Hans-Jürgen Bock later joined his trio.

Viera taught at the University of Duisburg-Essen from 1971 to 1998, appointed professor there in 1981. He also taught at the Hochschule für Musik, Theater und Medien Hannover from 1971 to 1997 and lectured at LMU Munich, and the University of Passau. He published jazz method books and organized jazz workshops in Germany and elsewhere in Europe. In 1978, he was sent to Africa by the Goethe Institute, and in 2000, to China. He sat on the board of the Deutsche Jazzunion for nearly forty years.

In 1970, Viera was the founder and musical director of the Internationale Jazzwoche Burghausen, that he directed for more than 50 years. As of 2019, it had over 10,000 visitors. In 1993, Viera co-founded the Lehrer Big Band Bayern (LBB Bayern) after a course at the Academy for Teacher Training and Personnel Management in Dillingen, with Walter A. Neubeck who lectured there; Viera was its musical director until the early 2000s. He recorded several CDs with this ensemble.

Viera became ill in 2022 and missed the Internationale Jazzwoche festival for the first year since its inception. His health further deteriorated after a fall in 2024, and he died on 7 April 2024, at the age of 91.
