= Ziferblat (band) =

Ukrainian musical group

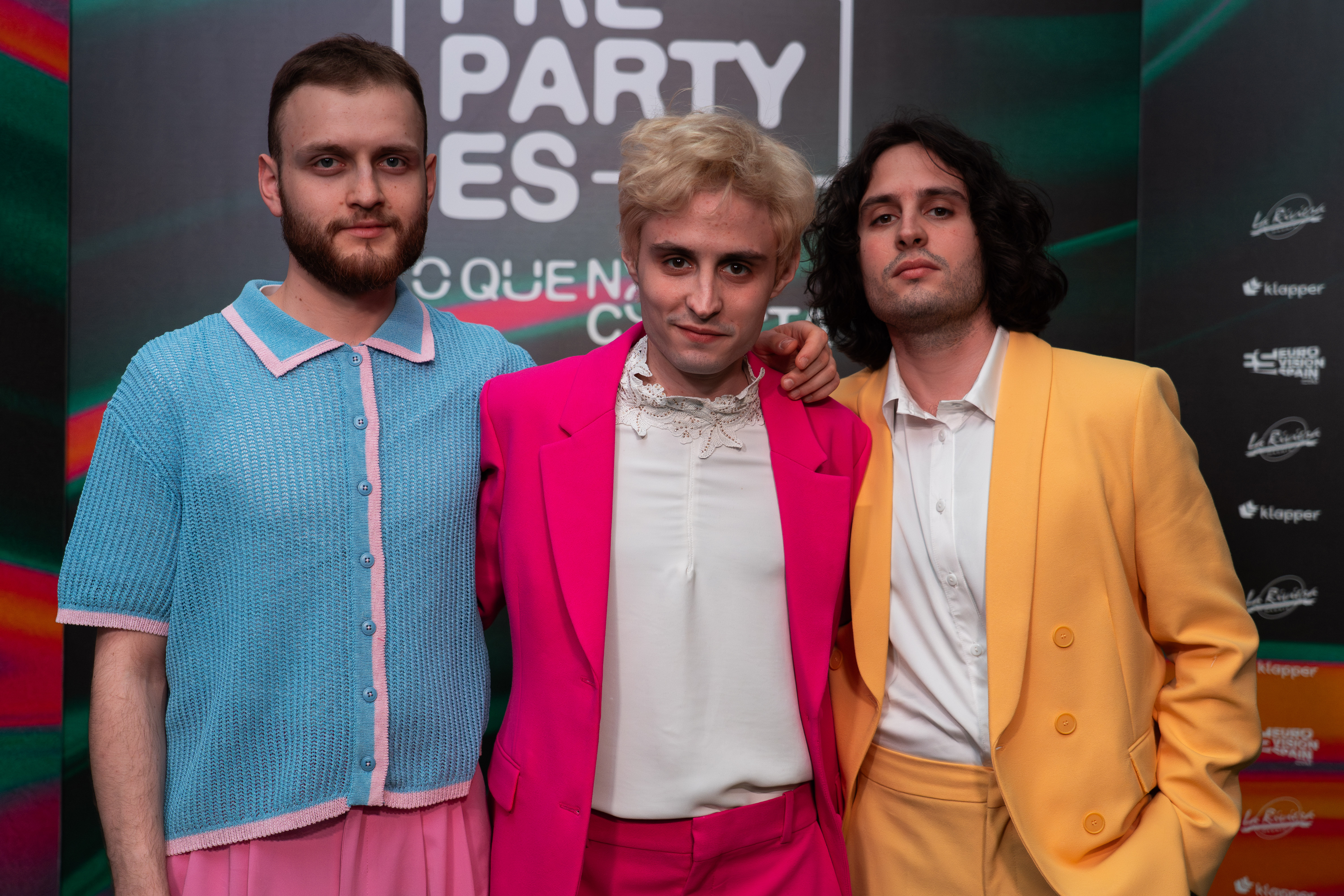
- Ziferblat in 2025

Background information
- Origin: Kyiv, Ukraine
- Years active: 2015–present
- Members: Daniil Leshchynskyi; Valentyn Leshchynskyi; Fedir Khodakov
- Past members: Zhenia Shevchenko; Valentyn Oliynyk; Viktor Nikolenko

Ziferblat (Ukrainian: Циферблат, romanized: Tsyferblat, lit. 'Clock face') is a Ukrainian music band consisting of vocalist Daniil Leshchynskyi, guitarist Valentyn Leshchynskyi, and drummer Fedir Khodakov. They represented Ukraine in the Eurovision Song Contest 2025 with the song "Bird of Pray".

== History ==
Fraternal twin brothers Daniil (Note: Also spelled as Daniel.) and Valentyn Leshchynskyi began their music education at the age of six, attending a music school where they learned the cello and later graduated. They developed an interest in rock music and, after ninth grade, formed Runnin' Blue, in reference to the Doors' song of the same name. In 2015, after Euromaidan, the brothers decided to write songs in Ukrainian instead of English and formed Ziferblat.

Ziferblat's first EP, Kinoseans, was released in December 2017, with its contributors consisting of the Leshchynskyi brothers, bassist Yevhen Shevchenko, drummer Valentyn Oliinyk, keyboardist Viktor Nikolenko, and saxophonist Andrii Martynenko. In 2019, the band released the single "Vnochi" and hired drummer Fedir Khodakov to perform it on the X-Factor TV show. Khodakov continued to perform with the band and became its permanent member.

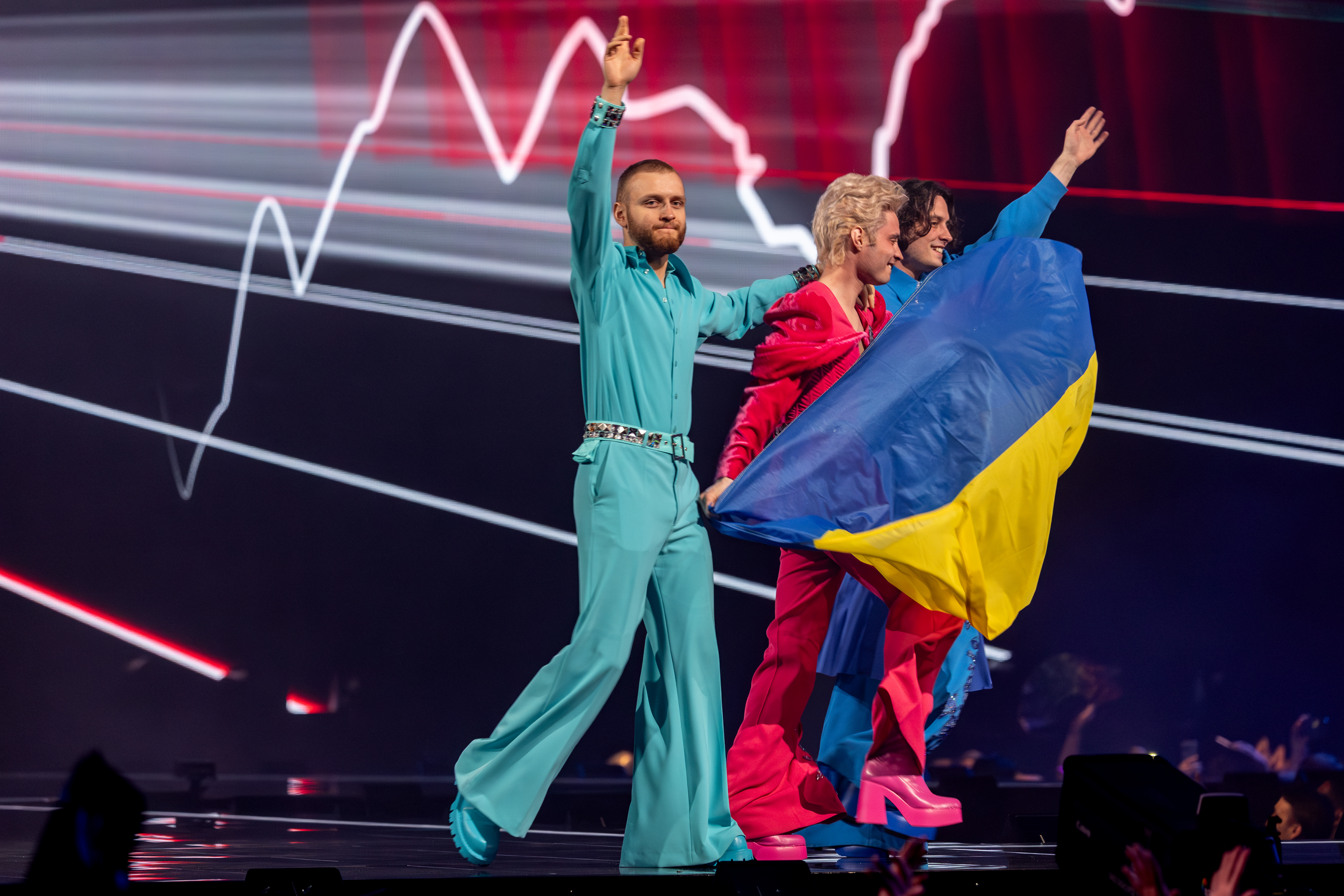
Ziferblat at the Eurovision Song Contest 2025

In 2022, Ziferblat presented a music video for the song "Zemlia". In October of the same year, it was announced that the band made it to the long list of the Vidbir 2023, the Ukrainian national selection for the Eurovision Song Contest 2023, but did not make it to the shortlist. In November, they released the single "Dlia choho ty pryishla?", the second from the album Peretvorennia. In February 2023, they released their third and final single from the album, "Dysko-Fanko Terapiia". The album itself was released on April 7, 2023, and was presented at a solo concert on April 22. The album consists of 13 songs, mostly written in the period from 2019 to 2020. In September of the same year, Ziferblat won the "Muzvar Awards" in the category of "Best New Names in Alternative Music".

Ziferblat reached the final of Vidbir 2024 for Eurovision 2024 with the song "Place I Call Home". The band took second place in the overall ranking, receiving 11 points from the jury and 8 points from the audience.

On 8 February 2025, the band won the Ukrainian national selection for the Eurovision Song Contest 2025 in Basel, Switzerland, earning the right to represent Ukraine with the song "Bird of Pray". Despite having the same amount of points as Albania, they finished 9th due to having received a lower score in the televote.

== Band members ==
Current members

- Daniil Leshchynskyi (born 15 November 1996) – vocals, keyboard (2015–present)
- Valentyn Leshchynskyi (born 15 November 1996) – guitar (2015–present)
- Fedir Khodakov (born 28 February 1998) – drums (2019–present)

Former members

- Viktor Nikolenko – keyboard (2015–2018)
- Valentyn Oliynyk – drums (2015–2018)
- Yevhen "Zhenia" Shevchenko – bass guitar, drums (2018–2021)

== Discography ==
=== Albums ===
- 2023 – Peretvorennia
- 2025 – Of Us
- 2026 – Melankholiia

=== EPs ===
- 2017 – Kinoseans

=== Singles ===
- 2019 – "Vnochi"
- 2022 – "Zemlia"
- 2022 – "Dlia choho ty pryishla?"
- 2023 – "Dysko-Fanko Terapiia"
- 2023 – "Place I Call Home"
- 2024 – "Litaky"
- 2024 – "Druh"
- 2024 – "Doteper i nazavzhdy" (feat. Tember Blanche)
- 2025 – "Bud zdorov" (feat. Artem Pyvovarov and The Byca)
- 2025 – "Nezrivniannyi svit krasy"
- 2026 – "Misto"
- 2026 – "Bozhevoliyu"

=== Charted singles ===
Title	Year	Peak chart positions				Album
Title	Year	UKR	UKR Air.	LTU	SWE Heat.	Album
"Bird of Pray"	2025	16	34	15	7	Of Us

== Awards and nominations ==
Year	Award	Category	Nominee(s)	Result	Ref.
2025	Eurovision Awards	Style Icon	Themselves	Nominated	

== Notes ==
Awards and achievements
Preceded by Alyona Alyona and Jerry Heil with "Teresa & Maria"	Ukraine in the Eurovision Song Contest; 2025	Succeeded by Leléka with "Ridnym"
