= Fiïnka =

Ukrainian singer and actress

Iryna Vykhovanets
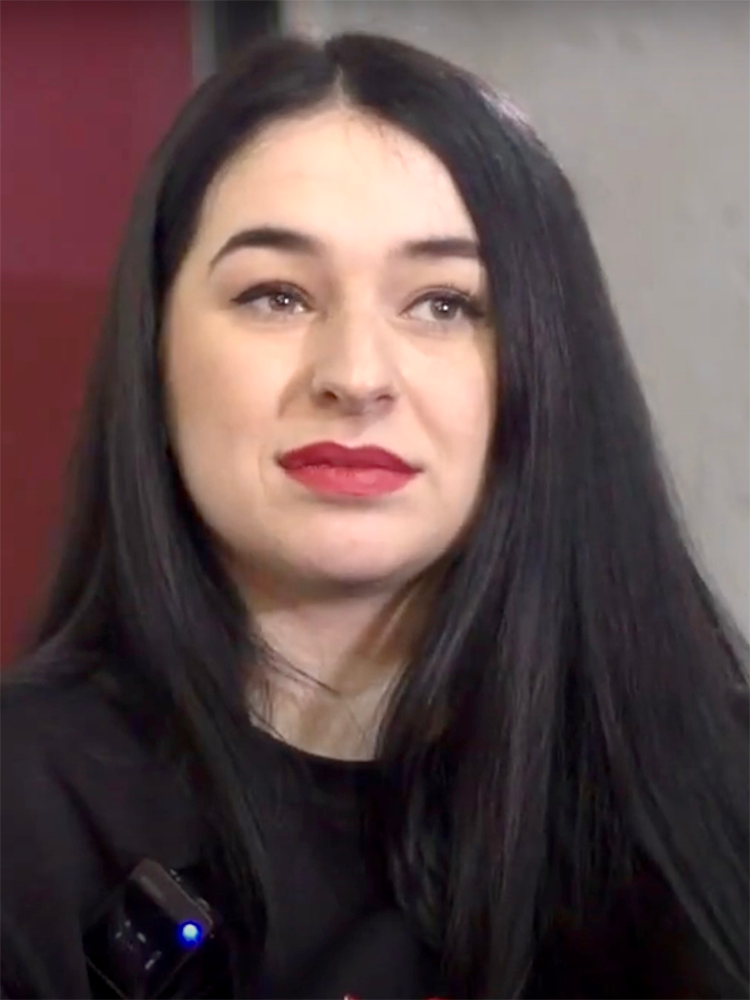
- Fiïnka in 2023

Background information
- Also known as: Fiïnka
- Born: Iryna Yaroslavivna Bilak; October 9, 1993 (age 32); Nadvirna, Ivano-Frankivsk Oblast, Ukraine
- Origin: Ukraine
- Occupations: Singer; actress
- Instrument: Violin
- Years active: 2019–present
- Labels: KINGLOMERATE (2019–2022); Enko (2022–present)
- Spouse: Yuriy Vykhovanets (m. 2018)

Iryna Yaroslavivna Vykhovanets (née Bilak; born October 9, 1993), professionally known as Fiïnka, is a Ukrainian singer and actress. She is the founder and host of the comedic project Lizhnyk TV on YouTube. Fiïnka is recognized for promoting Hutsul culture through her music and performances. She was a finalist in the Ukrainian national selection for Eurovision 2023 Vidbir 2023 with song "Dovbush" and Vidbir 2025 with song "Kultura".

== Career ==
Fiïnka was born in Nadvirna and currently resides in Ivano-Frankivsk. From an early age, she demonstrated a love for music and performed on the violin. She graduated from Vasyl Stefanyk Precarpathian National University. In 2019, Fiïnka created Lizhnyk TV, a comedic YouTube project, where she serves as the host, director, and screenwriter. That same year, she debuted as a singer under the stage name Fiïnka, releasing her hit single "Hruba". Since 2022, she has been collaborating with the Enko music label.

== Style ==
Fiïnka actively incorporates Hutsul cultural elements into her music and comedic sketches. Her performances highlight the dialect, accent, and unique features of the Hutsul culture, aiming to introduce these traditions to a broader audience.

== Discography ==
=== Singles ===
- 2012 — Що потрібно тобі (feat. Dima)
- 2012 — В ударах серця (feat. Dima)
- 2012 — Мрія (feat. Dima)
- 2019 — Груба
- 2020 — До танцю!
- 2021 — Колєда
- 2021 — Гуцулія рулит!
- 2021 — Ґачі від Ґуччі
- 2021 — Ватра-вогень
- 2022 — Цілюватись
- 2022 — Зірочки
- 2022 — Бий!
- 2022 — Довбуш
- 2023 — Плакали
- 2023 — Видко литку
- 2023 — Наше злото (feat. alyona alyona)
- 2023 — Дощ паде
- 2023 — Люди
- 2023 — Не журімоси
- 2024 — Мої гори
- 2024 — Гуцулянка (feat. Ivan Popovych)
- 2024 — Курва
- 2024 — Колискова
- 2025 — Культура

== Music videos ==
Year	Title	Director
2019	Груба	Iryna Vykhovanets
2022	Довбуш	Oleksandr Lytviynenko
2023	Люди	Khrystyna Braslavska
2023	Мої гори	Khrystyna Braslavska
2024	Курва	Khrystyna Braslavska
2024	Колискова	Khrystyna Braslavska
