= DK Energetyk =

Ukrainian post-punk band

- Origin: Brovary and Kyiv, Ukraine
- Genres: Post-punk, coldwave
- Years active: 2022–present
- Labels: PLAN, HVG
- Members: Yakiv Marnyi; Vsevolod Shutka; Oleksandr "Fol" Folianskyi

DK Energetyk or DK Enerhetyk (Ukrainian: ДК Енергетик) is a Ukrainian musical band performing in the post-punk genre. In 2023, the band released two albums, Ukrainian: Yunist, lit. 'Youth' and Shliakh, 'Pathway', followed by their third album Zavtra, 'Tomorrow' in 2024. The band was a winner of the Muzvar Awards 2024.

== History ==
The band was formed in early 2022 by Yakiv Marnyi (vocals), Vsevolod Shutka (guitar), and Oleksandr "Fol" Folianskyi (bass guitar). Before forming DK Energetyk, the members played in other projects: Yakiv in the rock band Marnyi, Vsevolod in MyInk, and Fol in My*17. The name "DK Energetyk" originates from the Palace of Culture Enerhetik in Prypiat, located in the Chornobyl Exclusion Zone.

Their first single, "Energetyk," was released in February 2023. That same year, DK Energetyk released two studio albums, Yunist (transl. Youth) and Shliakh (transl. Path).

In the summer of 2024, it was revealed that the band's song "Vulytsia Skhid" ("East Street") would be featured in the video game S.T.A.L.K.E.R. 2: Heart of Chornobyl. Later, it was revealed that five more of the band's tracks would also appear in the game. On September 20, 2024, the band released their third studio album Zavtra (transl. Tomorrow), with an album presentation concert held in Kyiv on November 29. Prior to that, DK Energetyk premiered a music video for the song "Enerhetyk", dedicated to power engineers who lost their lives during Russia's full-scale invasion of Ukraine. The video was filmed in the Chornobyl Exclusion Zone.

DK Enerhetyk made the longlist of participants for the Vidbir 2025 for the Eurovision Song Contest 2025 and advanced to the finals of the National Selection with their song "Сіль" (transl. Salt).

== Band members ==
- Yakiv Marnyi — lead vocals
- Vsevolod Shutka — guitar
- Oleksandr "Fol" Folianskyi — bass guitar

== Musical style and influences ==
In their early works, the band aimed to capture the atmosphere of the 1990s post-Soviet Ukraine. However, their album Zavtra reflects on contemporary themes.

== Discography ==
=== Albums ===
- Юність (2023)
- Шлях (2023)
- Завтра (2024)
- Квадрати (2025)
- 86.4 ФМ (2026)

== Awards ==
Year	Award	Category	Result	Notes	Ref.
2024	Muzvar Awards	New Wave — Best New Names in Rock Music	Winner	DK Energetyk	
