= Dieter Ilg =

German jazz double-bassist (born 1961)

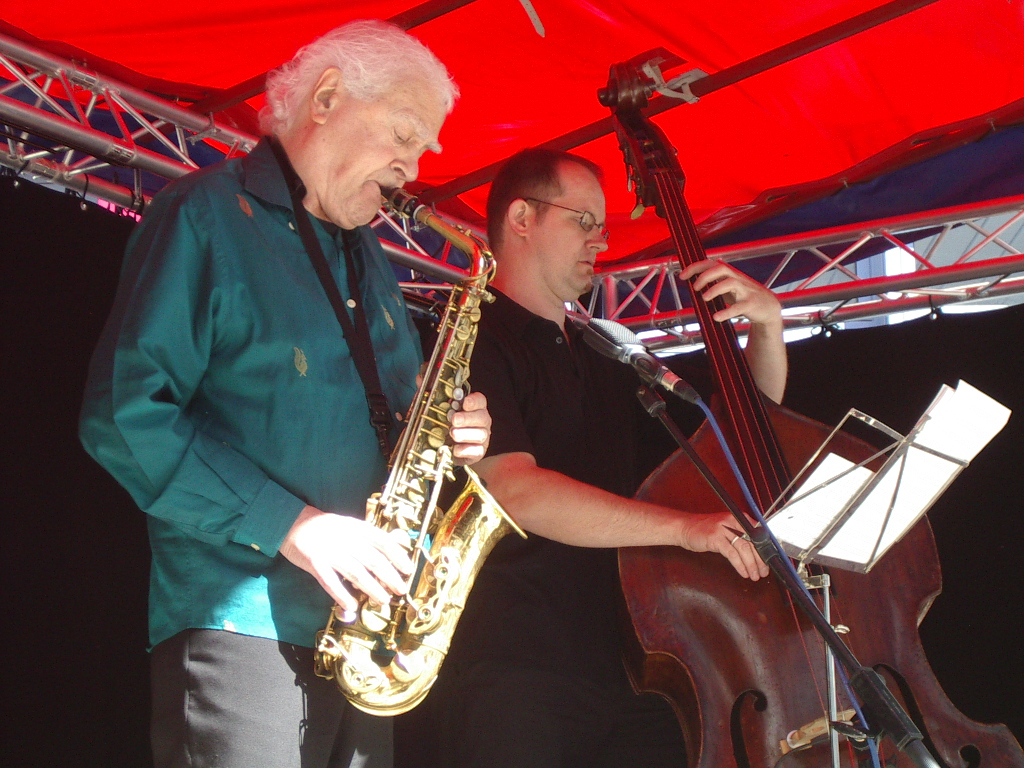
Dieter Ilg and Charlie Mariano, 2005

Dieter Josef Ilg (born September 30, 1961, in Offenburg) is a German jazz double-bassist.

He worked early in his career with Joe Viera in the early 1980s, then with Randy Brecker, the WDR Big Band, Bennie Wallace, Albert Mangelsdorff, Wolfgang Dauner, Charlie Mariano, Marc Copland, Jeff Hirshfield, Wolfgang Muthspiel and others. He has taught at Rockschool Freiburg and the Freiburg Conservatory.

== Discography ==
=== As leader ===
- Ilg/Schroder/Haffner (Mood, 1989)
- Summerhill (Lipstick, 1991)
- Fieldwork (Jazzline, 1998)
- Live (Fullfat, 2001)
- Bass (Fullfat, 2008)
- Otello (Fullfat, 2010)
- Otello Live at Schloss Elmau (ACT, 2011)
- Parsifal (ACT, 2013)
- Mein Beethoven (ACT, 2015)
- B-A-C-H (ACT, 2017)
- Nightfall with Till Bronner (Masterworks, 2018)

With Marc Copland

- Tracks (Bellaphon, 1992)
- Two Way Street (Jazzline, 1993)
- What's Goin' On (Jazzline, 1994)

With Charlie Mariano

- A La Carte (Fullfat, 2009)
- Due (Fullfat, 2009)
- Goodbye Pork Pie Hat (Sommelier Du Son, 2009)
