= There will be people =

- І будуть люди
- Directed by: Arkadii Nepytaliuk
- Country of origin: Ukraine
- Original language: Ukrainian
- No. of episodes: 12

Original release
- Network: STB
- Release: 14 September – 19 September 2020

There Will Be People (Ukrainian: І будуть люди) is a Ukrainian dramatic epic television series produced for STB, serving as a screen adaptation of the eponymous novel by Anatolii Dimarov. Developed by Film.UA Studio with the support of the Ministry of Culture and Information Policy of Ukraine, the series was directed by Arkadii Nepytaliuk. Comprising twelve episodes, the series was broadcast between 14 and 19 September 2020. Each episode centres on an individual character, offering a multifaceted portrayal of Ukrainian society during times of historical upheaval.

== Plot summary ==
=== Episode 1 ===
A Ukrainian village, 1901, Poltava Governorate, Russian Empire. A wealthy, elderly peasant, Svyryd Ivasiuta, takes a young woman named Olena from a poor family as his wife without a formal wedding and brings her to live with him on his farmstead.

They are met at the farmstead by Svyryd’s son, Oksen, and a hired labourer, Vasyl Hanzha. Due to the significant age difference, Olena feels no emotional connection to Svyryd and soon begins an affair with Vasyl, from whom she becomes pregnant within a year. After some time, the lovers attempt to flee the homestead together. However, Svyryd catches up with them, violently assaults Vasyl—breaking his arm even after he has lost consciousness—and forcibly takes Olena back home. Upon obtaining her confession that the child is not his, Svyryd, in a fit of rage, murders her.

Vasyl Hanzha, having regained consciousness, returns to the house and sets fire to the thatched roof of the Ivasiuta dwelling using a lantern (at the time, the roofs of Ukrainian peasant homes—mazanky—were typically made of straw). The following morning, the Tsarist police arrive and arrest both men. As a result, Svyryd and Hanzha are sent into exile, while Oksen is left alone to raise the child.

Fourteen years later, in 1915, Svyryd returns home on foot and discovers that his son has established a family of his own. He also encounters Olena’s daughter, Lesia, who bears a striking resemblance to her mother. By this time, soldiers of the retreating Imperial Russian Army—disbanding along the collapsing fronts of the First World War—have begun looting homes along their path. During an attempted robbery, they are killed, and Svyryd is severely wounded. On his deathbed, the old man imparts a final piece of advice to his son: “Live in such a way that you bow to no one but God.”

=== Episode 2 ===
In the spring of 1917, Tetyana Svitlychna, the daughter of an Orthodox priest, returns to her native village of Tarasivka from the Poltava Theological Seminary. There, she meets and falls in love with Oleh Myroslavsky, the son of the local physician. While the global conflict of the First World War continues to unfold, daily life in the Ukrainian countryside follows its habitual rhythm. At a village gathering, Oleh’s father informs the local peasants of the proclamation of the Third Universal by the Ukrainian Central Rada, which marked the granting of autonomy to the Ukrainian People's Republic (UNR). However, his speech is interrupted by Tetyana’s father, the village priest.

Following the October Revolution, Bolshevik forces advance into Ukrainian territory, plunging the region into the chaos of civil war. Tetyana’s brother, Fedir Svitlychnyi, joins the Red Army, despite their father’s declining health due to tuberculosis. The Bolsheviks, seeking medical assistance for a wounded Red Guard soldier, approach Dr. Myroslavsky—Oleh’s father—but later execute him. Driven by grief and a desire for vengeance, Oleh turns against Soviet authority. After a bitter quarrel with Tetyana, he enlists as a soldier in the army of the Ukrainian People's Republic.

At the behest of her parents, Tetyana marries Oksen Ivasiuta and, together with Lesia, helps raise his two sons.

=== Episode 3 ===
After the conclusion of the Russian Civil War, Vasyl Hanzha returns from exile to Tarasivka and assumes the position of village head, with the active support of the local Bolshevik operative Maksym Tverkokhlib. Upon their arrival, units of the Red Army carry out executions of so-called kulaks—defined broadly as anyone possessing as few as three chickens. Resistance to the Bolshevik terror is led by Mykola Haiduk, who, having lost his land, sets fire to the village council building. He subsequently retreats to the fields and wages a partisan struggle alongside his followers.

=== Episode 4 ===
To suppress Haiduk’s so-called “bandits,” agents of the OGPU (Joint State Political Directorate) are dispatched from Russia. However, after a series of unsuccessful attempts to quell the resistance, the Soviet security forces are ultimately forced to withdraw.

=== Episode 5 ===
Under orders from the commissar, Fedir Svitlychnyi arrives in Tarasivka, and it is only through his intervention—alongside the efforts of local Bolsheviks—that the "band" led by Haiduk is finally subdued. In order to avoid capture and the likelihood of torture, Mykola Haiduk ultimately takes his own life.

Of the partisans, only Mykhailo Haiduk survives; he later escapes to Western Ukraine, which at the time was part of the Second Polish Republic.

=== Episode 6 ===
Vasyl Hanzha begins a romantic relationship with a local peasant woman named Marta. Meanwhile, Lesia flees to Poltava with Fedir Svitlychnyi, seeking to escape the increasingly oppressive atmosphere in the village. At the same time, Tetyana Ivasiuta gives birth to a child, further intertwining the personal and political fates of the villagers of Tarasivka.

=== Episode 7 ===
Tetyana gives birth under the care of a doctor who turns out to be Oleh Myroslavskyi, now living under an assumed name to avoid Soviet repression. The two rekindle their relationship and engage in an extramarital affair. In time, Tetyana learns that following the defeat of the Ukrainian People’s Republic army in 1920, Oleh had served as a physician in the headquarters of Symon Petliura. When a mortally wounded Bolshevik soldier was brought to them, Oleh took the man's identification papers and, by assuming his identity, narrowly escaped execution by the Red forces.

=== Episode 8 ===
Hanzha has a falling out with Marta. Shortly thereafter, Mykhailo Haiduk arrives in the village from Western Ukraine, having become a member of the Organization of Ukrainian Nationalists (OUN). Driven both by a desire to avenge his father’s death and by a profound sense of national subjugation, he returns prepared to take up the struggle against the communist regime.

=== Episode 9 ===
Maksym Tverdokhlib, who has adopted the name Volodymyr in honour of Lenin, publicly accuses Tetyana Ivasiuta of counterrevolutionary activities. Despite the scandal, she is nonetheless permitted to teach children in one of the village’s mazanky—a traditional earthen house—repurposed as a makeshift school. Oksen discovers letters written by Oleh, through which he learns of Tetyana’s infidelity. As a result, Tetyana flees the village. Oleh, now abandoned by his own wife and burdened by his concealed past, is forced into a life of constant evasion.

=== Episode 10 ===
Oleh goes into hiding in Belarus, but upon receiving a letter from his former wife—now gravely ill with tuberculosis—he returns to the Poltava region. There, she confesses to having destroyed some of Tetyana’s letters out of jealousy. The two reconcile and grant each other forgiveness before she passes away peacefully.

Meanwhile, numerous villagers—including Marta and Oksen—are subjected to dekulakization and forcibly deported to Siberia as part of the Stalinist repressions targeting wealthier peasants. Oksen’s two sons manage to escape, but their paths diverge, each following a different trajectory shaped by the turbulent sociopolitical landscape of the era.

=== Episode 11 ===
During the years of mass repression and collectivisation, Hryhorii Hintsburg, a local Jewish resident known for his reserved nature, writes a letter to Stalin expressing his concerns. The letter is intercepted, and he is accused of counterrevolutionary activity. Facing imminent arrest and persecution, he takes his own life. Vasyl Hanzha, who attempts to defend him, soon becomes a victim of repression himself, illustrating the indiscriminate and self-perpetuating nature of the Stalinist terror.

=== Episode 12 ===
During the Holodomor of 1932–1933, Volodymyr Tverdokhlib—formerly Maksym—assumes the position of village head. Illiterate and devoid of administrative competence, he presides over a community ravaged by famine. The village, placed on the "Blacklist" (Chorna doshka) for failing to meet grain quotas, is effectively cut off from external supplies, condemning its inhabitants to starvation. Tverdokhlib, instead of offering aid, mocks the suffering of his own native village, embodying the cynicism and brutality of the Stalinist regime at the local level.

Vasyl Hanzha is eventually sent to the same GULAG labour camp as Oksen Ivasiuta. In the face of shared suffering and years of ideological and personal conflict, the two men are finally reconciled, finding a measure of peace amid the brutality of the Soviet penal system.

Oleh, Tetyana, her son, and a young girl from the orphanage manage to cross a military checkpoint and travel to Poltava, where they settle at the invitation of Fedir Svitlychnyi. Meanwhile, in Tarasivka, Volodymyr Tverdokhlib meets a violent end at the hands of Mykhailo Haiduk, who exacts revenge for the years of repression and betrayal.

== Release ==
The series premiered in Ukraine on September 14, 2020, on STB, where it aired two episodes daily until September 19. In Canada, the series was released for streaming on CBC Gem on February 17, 2023.
