= Ridnym =

2026 single by Leléka

Single by Leléka
- Language: Ukrainian; English
- Released: 16 January 2026
- Length: 2:58
- Songwriters: Adama Cefalu; Jakob Hegner; Viktoria Leleka; Yaroslav Dzhus
- Producer: Jakob Hegner

Leléka singles chronology
"Znaty" (2025)	"Ridnym" (2026)

Eurovision Song Contest 2026 entry
- Country: Ukraine
- Artist: Leléka
- Languages: Ukrainian, English
- Composers: Adama Cefalu; Jakob Hegner; Viktoria Leleka; Yaroslav Dzhus
- Lyricists: Adama Cefalu; Viktoria Leleka

Finals performance
- Semi-final result: 6th
- Semi-final points: 174
- Final result: 9th
- Final points: 221

Entry chronology
- ◄ "Bird of Pray" (2025)

"Ridnym" (Ukrainian: Рідним, lit. 'to the dear ones') is a song by Ukrainian singer and songwriter Viktoria Leléka under her mononym Leléka. It was written by Leleka herself alongside Adama Cefalu, Jakob Hegner and Yaroslav Dzhus, with production credited to Hegner. The song was released on 16 January 2026 and represented Ukraine in the Eurovision Song Contest 2026. It finished in ninth place at the final.

== Background and composition ==
"Ridnym" was written by Viktoria Leléka, Adama Cefalu, Jakob Hegner and Yaroslav Dzhus.

== Eurovision Song Contest 2026 ==
=== Vidbir 2026 ===
Vidbir 2026 was the tenth edition of Vidbir that selected the Ukrainian entry for the Eurovision Song Contest 2026. The competition consisted of a final on 7 February 2026 and took place in Kyiv. The selection of the competing entries for the national final and ultimately the Ukrainian Eurovision entry took place over three stages. In the first stage, artists and songwriters had the opportunity to apply for the competition through an online submission form. 15 acts were longlisted and announced on 24 November 2025. The second stage involved the longlisted artists attending a scheduled audition, during which nine acts were selected and announced on 3 December 2025. An additional act was selected from an online selection via the Diia mobile application. The third stage was the final, which took place on 7 February 2026 and featured the ten acts vying to represent Ukraine in Vienna, with the results based on the 50/50 combination of votes from the public (via Diia) and a five-member jury panel (a larger one than in previous editions), with each juror assessing a different aspect of the performances while formulating their scores. After passing the initial selection phase, Leléka was confirmed among the 10 finalists of the competition with the song "Ridnym" on 3 December 2025. The combined vote of the public and jury crowned her the winner and national representative on the Eurovision stage in Vienna, gaining 20 points.

=== At Eurovision ===
The Eurovision Song Contest 2026 took place at Wiener Stadthalle in Vienna, Austria, and consisted of two semi-finals to be held on the respective dates of 12 and 14 May and the final on 16 May 2026. During the allocation draw held on 12 January 2026, Ukraine was drawn to compete in the second semi-final, performing in the second half of the show. Ukraine finished 6th in the second semi-final. In the final Ukraine finished 9th with 221 points.

== Charts ==
Chart performance for "Ridnym"
Chart (2026)	Peak position
Ukraine Airplay (TopHit)	55
