= Molodi =

Ukrainian music duo

- Origin: Mariupol, Ukraine
- Genres: Alt-pop; electronica
- Years active: 2020–present
- Labels: Makko Music
- Members: Kyrylo Rohovyi; Ivan Stepanishchev
- Past members: Mykyta Leontiev

Molodi (stylised in all caps) are a Ukrainian alt-pop duo from Mariupol, now based in Kyiv. It was formed in 2020 by vocalist and guitarist Kyrylo Rohovyi, drummer Ivan Stepanishchev, and Mykyta Leontiev (now known as Enleo).

== History ==
The musicians began their creative path as a street band in their hometown of Mariupol, Donetsk Oblast. After moving to Kyiv, Rohovyi and Stepanishchev continued to create music together and finally formed their own musical style.

Molodi released their first single "Nezalezhnist" with singers Ostrovskyi and Kelsy in 2022. Shortly later, after Russia occupied Mariupol, the band members wrote the song "Bil". The band kept releasing successful songs such as "Dim", "Ne zabudu", "Zhyvu napolovynu", and "Skarb" which they released with singer Michelle Andrade.

On 20 December 2024, it was revealed that Molodi would participate in Vidbir 2025, the Ukrainian national selection for the Eurovision Song Contest 2025, with the song "My Sea". The song was released on 23 January 2025. In the final on 8 February 2025, Molodi finished in second place with 16 points. On 3 December 2025, UA:PBC announced that Molodi will return to the contest in 2026.

== Discography ==
=== Singles ===
- 2022 – "Nezalezhnist" (transl. 'Independence'), with Ostrovskyi and Kelsy
- 2022 – "Nezalezhnist" (remix), with Ostrovskyi and Kelsy
- 2022 – "Sontse" (transl. 'Sun')
- 2022 – "Bil" (transl. 'Pain')
- 2023 – "Kino" (transl. 'Movie')
- 2023 – "Nikoly" (transl. 'Never')
- 2023 – "Dim" (transl. 'Home')
- 2023 – "Ne zabudu" (transl. 'I won't forget')
- 2023 – "Dopomozhit" (transl. 'Help')
- 2023 – "Ne zabudu" (Arfeeva remix)
- 2023 – "Skarb" (transl. 'Treasure'), with Michelle Andrade
- 2023 – "Krapliamy" (transl. 'Drops')
- 2024 – "Zhyvu napolovynu" (transl. 'I live half-heartedly')
- 2024 – "Toboiu khvoriiu" (transl. 'I'm sick of you')
- 2024 – "Ya ne ya" (transl. 'I'm not me')
- 2024 – "Serenady" (transl. 'Serenades')
- 2024 – "Pomóż mi" (transl. 'Help me')
- 2025 – "My Sea"
- 2025 – "Moie more" (transl. 'My sea', acoustic version)
- 2025 – "Odna na milion" (transl. 'One in a million')
- 2025 – "Pershyy nomer" (transl. 'First number'), with Masha Kondratenko
- 2025 – "Nebezpechna" (transl. 'Safe')
- 2025 – "Lavky pamyatayut" (transl. 'Benches remember')
- 2025 – "Rymska imperiya" (transl. 'Roman Empire'), with Grisana
- 2026 — "Legends"
