= Ukraine in the Eurovision Song Contest 2025 =

- Eurovision Song Contest 2025
- Participating broadcaster: Public Broadcasting Company of Ukraine (Suspilne)
- Country: Ukraine
- Selection process: Vidbir 2025
- Selection date: 8 February 2025

Competing entry
- Song: "Bird of Pray"
- Artist: Ziferblat
- Songwriters: Valentyn Leshchynskyi; Danylo Leshchynskyi; Fedir Khodakov

Placement
- Semi-final result: Qualified (1st, 137 points)
- Final result: 9th, 218 points

Participation chronology

Ukraine was represented at the Eurovision Song Contest 2025 with the song "Bird of Pray", written by Danylo Leshchynskyi, Fedir Khodakov, and Valentyn Leshchynskyi, and performed by themselves as Ziferblat. The Ukrainian participating broadcaster, the Public Broadcasting Company of Ukraine (Suspilne), organised the national final Vidbir 2025 to select its entry for the contest. Artists had the chance to apply from 17 September to 10 November 2024. Twenty entries were longlisted, and, after auditions, nine were shortlisted. "Bird of Pray" won the national final, which was held on 8 February 2025.

Ukraine was drawn to compete in the first semi-final of the Eurovision Song Contest which took place on 13 May 2025 and was later selected to perform in position 5. At the end of the show, "Bird of Pray" was announced among the top 10 entries of the first semi-final and hence qualified to compete in the final. It was later revealed that Ukraine placed first out of the fifteen participating countries in the semi-final with 137 points. In the final, Ukraine performed in position 7 and placed ninth out of the 26 performing countries, scoring a total of 218 points.

== Background ==
Before the 2025 contest, the National Television Company of Ukraine (NTU) until 2016, and Suspilne since 2017, had participated in the Eurovision Song Contest representing Ukraine 19 times since its first entry in 2003. It had won the contest on three occasions: in 2004 with the song "Wild Dances" performed by Ruslana, in 2016 with "1944" by Jamala, and in 2022 with the song "Stefania" performed by Kalush Orchestra. It had been the runner-up in the contest on two occasions: in 2007 with the song "Dancing Lasha Tumbai" performed by Verka Serduchka and in 2008 with the song "Shady Lady" performed by Ani Lorak. Ukraine had reached third place in two occasions: in 2013 with the song "Gravity" performed by Zlata Ognevich and in 2024 with "Teresa & Maria" performed by Alyona Alyona and Jerry Heil. Following the introduction of semi-finals in 2004, Ukraine had managed to qualify to the final in every contest it participated in thus far. Its least successful result had been 24th place, which was achieved in 2017 with the song "Time" performed by O.Torvald. As part of its duties as participating broadcaster, Suspilne organises the selection of its entry in the Eurovision Song Contest and broadcasts the event in the country. Suspilne confirmed its intentions to participate at the 2025 contest on 10 September 2024. Since 2016, Vidbir, the national selection, is used to select entries to participate in Eurovision.

== Before Eurovision ==
=== Vidbir 2025 ===
Vidbir 2025 was the ninth edition of Vidbir, which selected the Ukrainian entry for the Eurovision Song Contest 2025. The competition consisted of a final on 8 February 2025, taking place in Kyiv.

==== Format ====
The selection of the competing entries for the national final and ultimately the Ukrainian Eurovision entry took place over three stages. In the first stage, artists and songwriters had the opportunity to apply for the competition through an online submission form. Twenty acts were longlisted and announced on 11 December 2024. The second stage will involve the longlisted artists attending a scheduled audition. Up to nine acts will be selected, while an additional act will be selected from an online selection. The third stage was the televised final, which took place in February 2025 and featured the acts vying to represent Ukraine in Basel. The winner was selected via the combination of votes from a public vote and an expert jury, the latter of which will have its members selected by the public.

==== Competing entries ====
Artists and composers had the opportunity to submit their entries via an online submission form, which accepted entries between 17 September 2024 and 10 November 2024. Only artists that had not performed in events organized by/located in the territory of "the aggressor state" (referring to Russia) or illegally entered the territory of Crimea since 15 March 2014 were allowed to apply for the competition, and songs performed in the "language of the aggressor state" (referring to the Russian language) were prohibited. Tina Karol, who represented Ukraine in 2006, was assigned as the new music producer of the competition and was the lead in reviewing the 374 received submissions. 20 entries were longlisted, of which their artists were announced on 11 December 2024. Auditions were held in late December 2024, where nine entries were shortlisted to compete in the national final. On 20 December 2024, the nine selected competing acts were announced. A public online vote among the non-qualifying entries from the auditions will be held by 17 January 2025 to determine an additional competing act.

Longlisted artists
- Abiie
- Brykulets
- DK Enerhetyk
- Enleo
- Fiïnka
- Future Culture
- Grisana
- Khayat
- Krylata
- Masha Kondratenko
- Molodi
- Mon Fia
- Muaiad
- Ranrawi
- Slukhai Sashu
- Starykova Khrystyna
- ~~Teslenko~~ (Note: Teslenko withdrew from the competition before the online voting round was opened.)
- Yagody
- Vlad Sheriff
- Ziferblat

Online wildcard – 13-17 January 2025
R/O	Artist	Song	Songwriter(s)	Votes	Place
1	Enleo	"Supernova"	Oleksandr Biliak; Mykyta Leontiev	41,649	2
2	Muayad	"Amnesia"	Yevhenii Zapotieiev; Muaiad Abdelrakhim	28,157	4
3	Brykulets	"Kryshtali" (Кришталi)	Ivan Ishchenko	10,528	8
4	Ranrawi	"Anymore"	Kuzianna Fidelska	3,431	10
5	Grisana	"Kohoney"	Ivan Klymenko; Stanislav Chornyi; Anastasiia Hrytsun; Storm	13,637	7
6	Slukhai Sashu	"Zhyvy" (Живи)	Oleksandra Blyzniukova; Oleksandra Honcharuk	19,646	6
7	Mon Fia	"Dive Inside"	Hannes Volz; Michael C. Fischer; Sofiia Semeniuk	24,095	5
8	Yagody	"BramaYa" (БрамаЯ)	Viktoriia Solovyiuk; Serhii Svirskyi; Teymuraz Gogitidze	31,676	3
9	Starykova Khrystyna	"Rise"	Khrystyna Starykova	9,652	9
10	Fiïnka	"Kultura" (Культура)	Iryna Vykhovanets; Oles Mykhailovych	79,699	1

Vidbir 2025 participating entries
Artist	Song	Songwriter(s)
Abiie	"Dim" (Дім)	Nataliya Shevchenko-Korovina
DK Enerhetyk	"Sil'" (Cіль)	Vsevolod Shutka; Oleksandr Folyanskyi; Yakiv Marnyi
Fiïnka	"Kultura" (Культура)	Iryna Vykhovanets; Oles Mykhailovych
Future Culture	"Waste My Time"	Andrii Lytvynenko; Andrii Shulakov; Daria Remez; Oleksii Rudenko; Oleksii Savienkov
Khayat	"Honor"	Andrii Khayat
Krylata	"Stay True"	Anastasiia Zavadska; Vladyslav Malyi
Masha Kondratenko	"No Time to Cry"	Mariia Kondratenko; Roman Hrysiuk; Stanislav Malikov
Molodi	"My Sea"	Kyrylo Rohovyi; Andrii Parfenov; Anton Chilibi; Ivan Stepanishchev
Vlad Sheriff	"Wind of Change"	Vlad Sheriff; Nikita Shkuropat
Ziferblat	"Bird of Pray"	Valentyn Leshchynskyi; Danylo Leshchynskyi; Fedir Khodakov

==== Jury member selection ====
The three members of the expert jury for Vidbir 2025 were selected among nine candidates via a public online vote on the Diia application, open to all Ukrainian citizens from 16 to 23 December 2024. A total of 442,374 votes were cast, with Jamala, Serhiy Tanchynets and Kateryna Pavlenko being determined as the jurors.

Vidbir 2025 judges

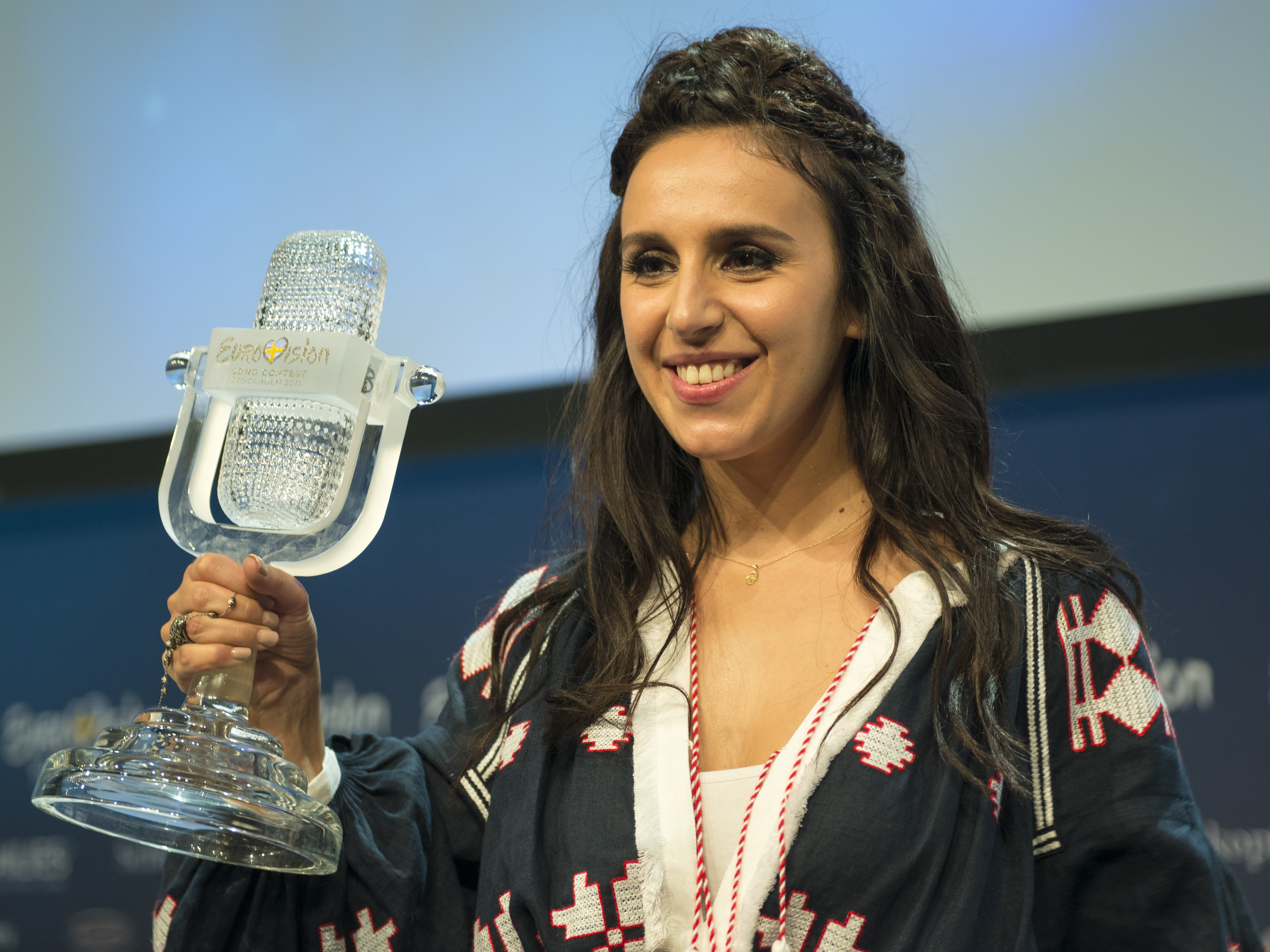
Jamala

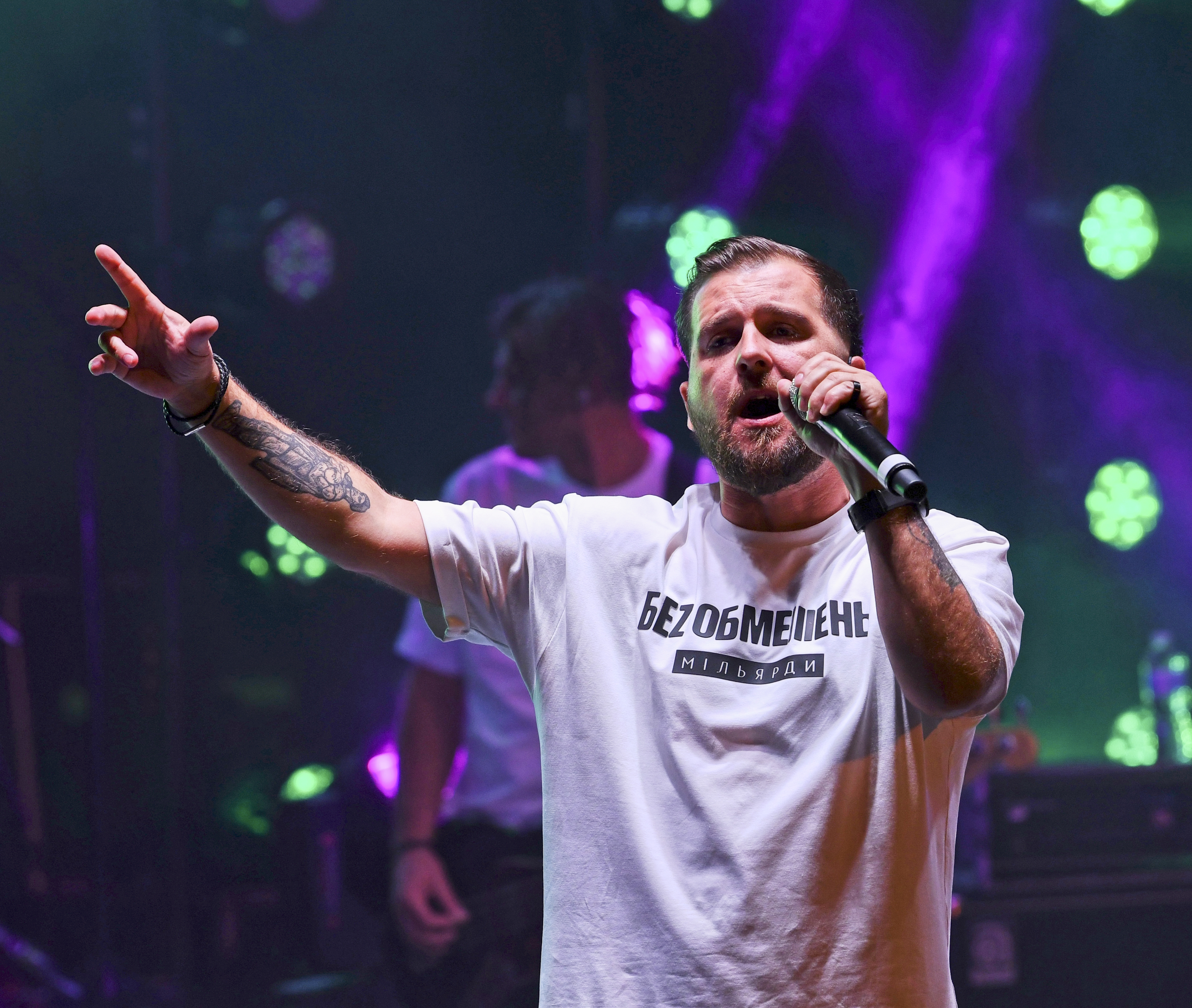
Serhiy Tanchynets

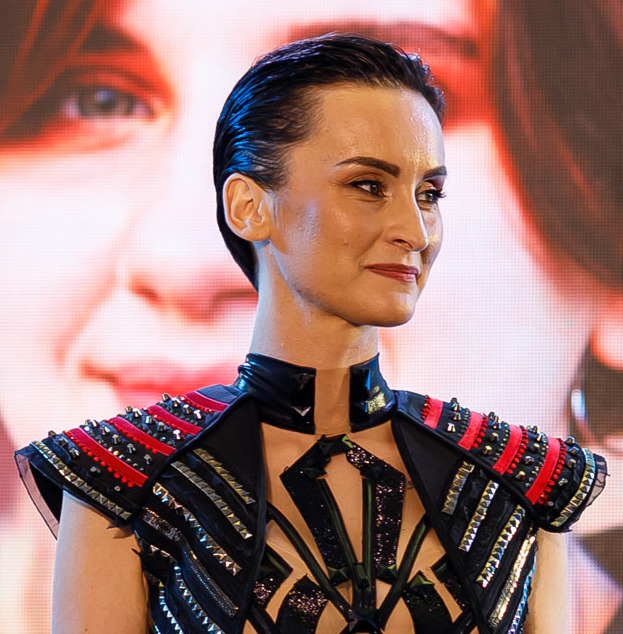
Kateryna Pavlenko

Jury member selection – 16-23 December 2024
Candidate	Occupation(s)	Score	Result
Andrii Hutsuliak	Winner of Vidbir 2023 and Ukrainian representative in the Eurovision Song Contest 2023 as part of Tvorchi	N/A	Not selected
Anna Svyrydova	Television and radio presenter	N/A	Not selected
Dmytro Shurov	Musician, music producer of 2023 and 2024 editions of Vidbir	N/A	Not selected
Dmytro Zezulin	Lead singer and composer of the band Latexfauna	N/A	Not selected
Jamala	Winner of Vidbir 2016 and of the Eurovision Song Contest 2016	35.28%	Selected
Kateryna Pavlenko	Winner of Vidbir 2020 and Ukrainian representative in the Eurovision Song Contest 2021 as part of Go A	11.84%	Selected
Katya Tsaryk	Film director and screenwriter	N/A	Not selected
Oleh Psiuk	Winner of the Eurovision Song Contest 2022 as part of Kalush Orchestra	N/A	Not selected
Sasha Chemerov	Musician, singer and producer	N/A	Not selected
Serhiy Tanchynets	Music producer, singer, and musician	20.24%	Selected

==== Final ====
The final took place on 8 February 2025. In addition to the competing entries, the guest performers included Alyona Alyona, Jamala, Jerry Heil, Kateryna Pavlenko, Mélovin, Ruslana, Tymofii Muzychuk, Tina Karol and Tvorchi with "Usmikhnysia meni", Ruslana with "Zakrutyla", Badstreet Boys with "Eurosong", and Artem Kotenko and Svitlana Tarabarova with "Hear Me Now". Ziferblat were declared the winners with the song "Bird of Pray".

Final – 8 February 2025
R/O	Artist	Song	Jury	Public vote		Total	Place
R/O	Artist	Song	Jury	Votes	Points	Total	Place
1	Vlad Sheriff	"Wind of Change"	1	2,302	1	2	10
2	Abiie	"Dim"	2	5,595	3	5	9
3	Molodi	"My Sea"	7	70,885	9	16	2
4	Future Culture	"Waste My Time"	5	2,338	2	7	8
5	Masha Kondratenko	"No Time to Cry"	8	62,439	8	16	3
6	Khayat	"Honor"	10	44,299	6	16	4
7	Fiïnka	"Kultura"	6	52,858	7	13	5
8	Krylata	"Stay True"	4	11,726	4	8	7
9	Ziferblat	"Bird of Pray"	9	90,390	10	19	1
10	DK Enerhetyk	"Sil"	3	19,556	5	8	6

=== Promotion and preparation ===
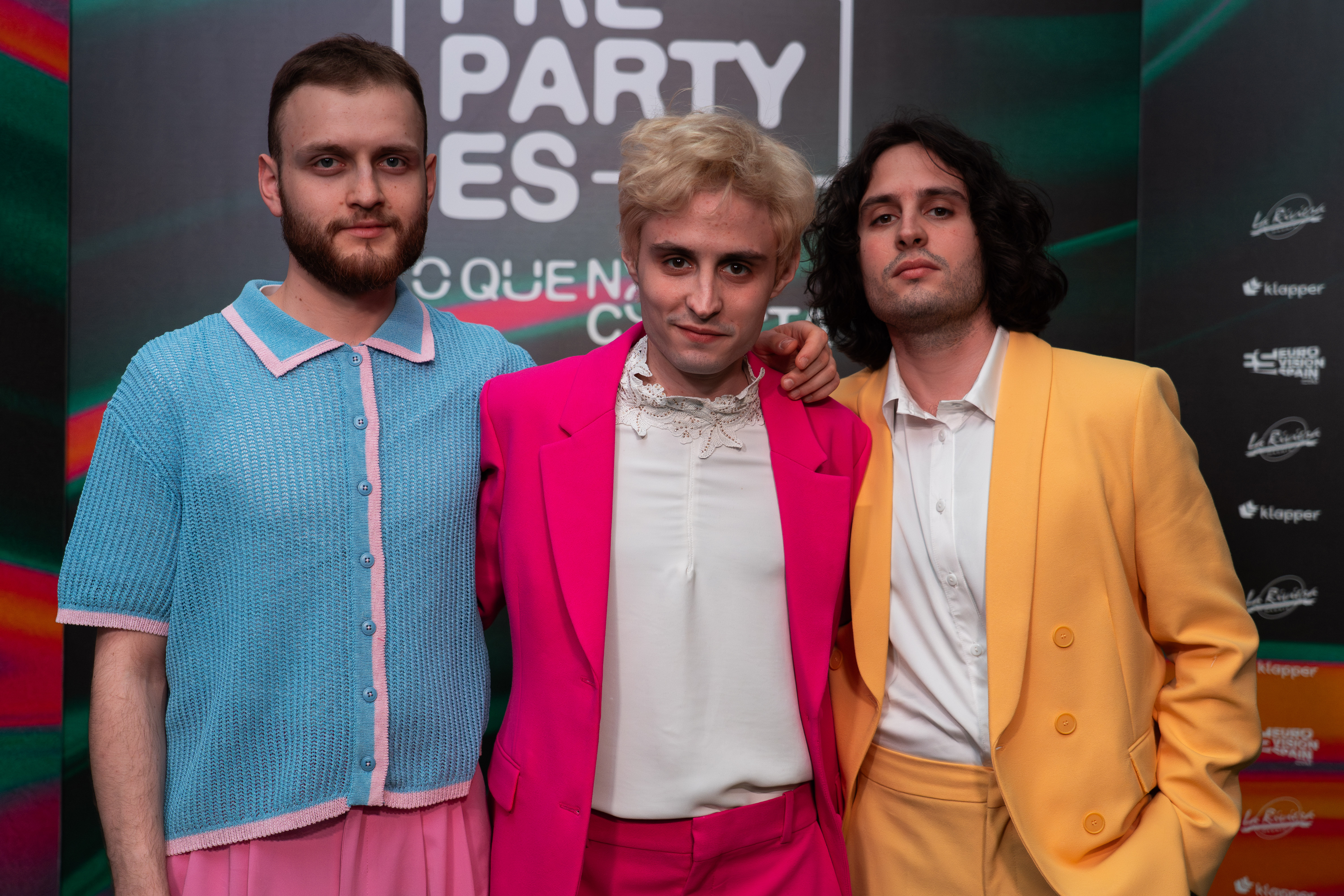
Ziferblat at the PrePartyES event in Madrid

In April, Ziferblat partnered with the Serhiy Prytula Humanitarian Foundation to purchase equipment for humanitarian demining through a fundraiser. On 18 and 19 April, they performed at the Pre-Party ES. On 25 April, Ziferblat performed the song at the Eurovision in Concert—described as the largest promotional concert for Eurovision—in Amsterdam; 30 representatives out of the 37 participants in the contest joined the concert. During their speech, they mentioned a missile attack on Kryvyi Rih. After winning Vidbir, Ziferblat decided to revamp the song once again for Eurovision. Adding orchestral parts in the chorus as well as a lightened chorus, Valeria Gazhala of Television News Service described the track better following the revamp.

== At Eurovision ==
The Eurovision Song Contest 2025 took place at St. Jakobshalle in Basel, Switzerland, and consisted of two semi-finals to be held on the respective dates of 13 and 15 May and the final on 17 May 2025. All nations with the exceptions of the host country and the "Big Five" (France, Germany, Italy, Spain and the United Kingdom) were required to qualify from one of two semi-finals to compete in the final; the top ten countries from each semi-final progressed to the final. During the allocation draw held on 28 January 2025, Ukraine was drawn to compete in the first semi-final, performing in the first half of the show. Ukraine performed in position 5, following Estonia and preceding Sweden. In Ukraine, all shows of the contest were broadcast by Suspilne. The main commentator was Timur Miroshnychenko, the host of the Eurovision Song Contest 2017.

=== Performances ===
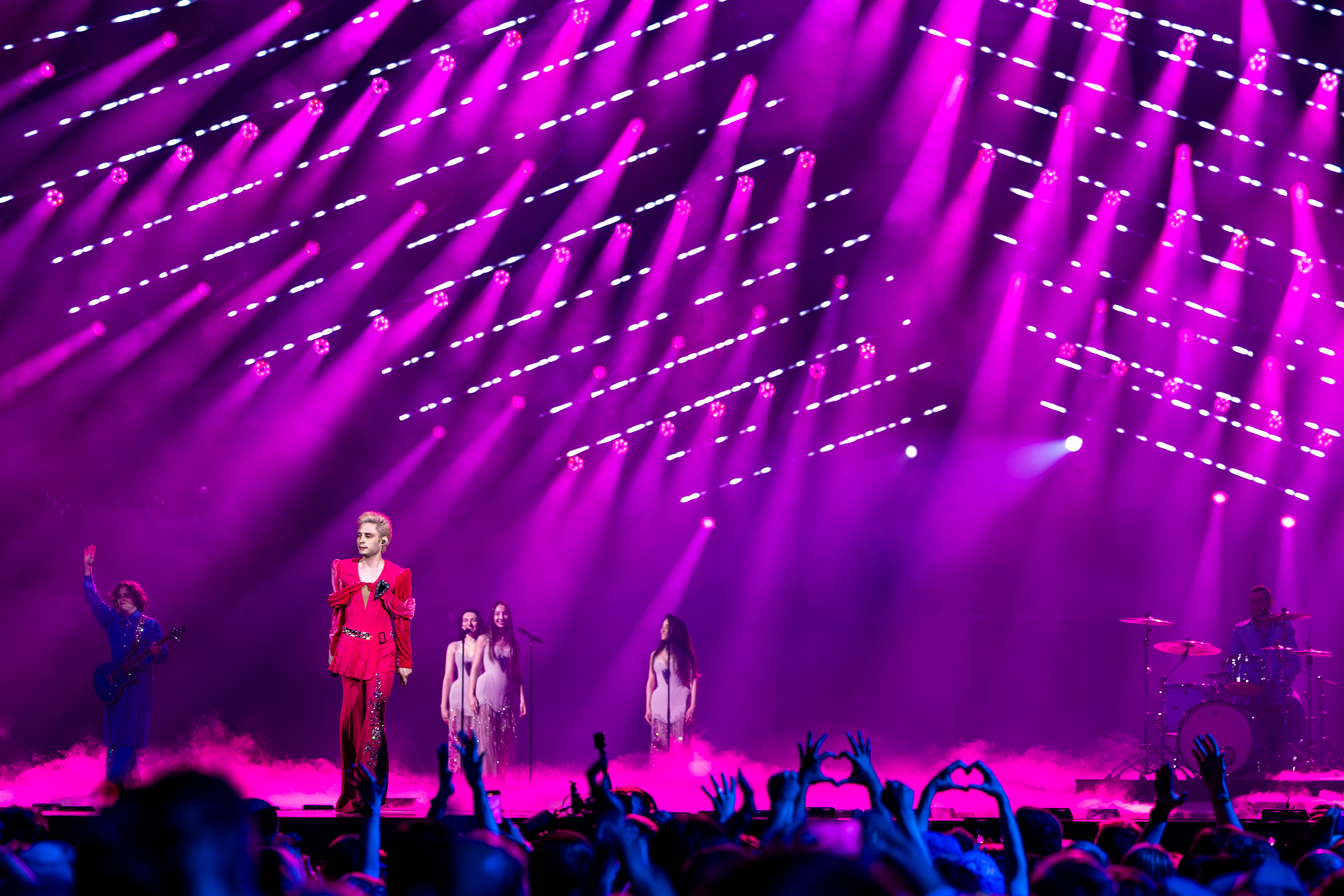
Ziferblat performing at the Eurovision Song Contest

Ziferblat took part in a technical rehearsal on 8 May and a dress rehearsal on 12 May. Through the director, major changes were made to the staging from the original Vidbir performance. Intense rehearsals were conducted both in person and online to ease logistical challenges due to having a team outside of Ukraine. One of the backing singers was Khrystyna Starykova, a participant at the 2025 Vidbir national selection. The performance was described as retro-style; bathed in soft pink light, a pair of giant wings unfurled at the climax. The LED walls contained pink and green graphics which matched the timing of the music.

Ukraine performed in the first semi-final at position 5, after Spain's Melody and before Sweden's KAJ. Ukraine qualified for the grand final, and it was later revealed that the country gained 137 points. In the grand final, Ukraine performed 7th in the running order, after Spain's Melody and before the United Kingdom's Remember Monday. Ukraine gained 218 points, placing ninth in the final.

=== Voting ===
Below is a breakdown of points awarded by and to Ukraine in the first semi-final and in the final. Voting during the three shows involved each country awarding sets of points from 1-8, 10, and 12: one from their professional jury and the other from televoting in the final vote, while the semi-final vote was based entirely on the vote of the public. The Ukrainian jury consisted of Dmytro Shurov, Kostiantyn Bocharov, Natela Zatsarynna, Olena Shoptenko-Ivanova and Tetiana Reshetniak. In the first semi-final, Ukraine placed 1st with 137 points, receiving 12 points from Cyprus, Poland, Portugal and Spain. In the final, Ukraine placed 9th with 218 points, receiving 12 points in the televote from Czechia, Poland, and Israel. Over the course of the contest, Ukraine awarded 12 points to Norway in the first semi-final, and to Germany (jury) and Lithuania (televote) in the final.

Ukraine qualified for the Grand Final, finishing 1st out of 15 participants with 137 points. In the final, Ukraine performed 7th in the running order, following Spain and preceding United Kingdom. In the final, Ukraine placed 9th with 218 points, finishing in 14th place in the jury voting with 60 points and in 6th place in the televote with 158 points. Suspilne appointed Jerry Heil, who together with alyona alyona represented Ukraine in 2024, as its spokesperson to announce the Ukrainian jury's votes in the final.

==== Points awarded to Ukraine ====
Points awarded to Ukraine (Semi-final 1)
Score	Televote
12 points	Cyprus; Poland; Portugal; Spain
10 points	Albania; Rest of the World
8 points	Estonia; Netherlands; Slovenia
7 points	Azerbaijan; Italy
6 points	Belgium; San Marino (Note: San Marino uses a jury in the semi-finals.)
5 points	Norway
4 points	Croatia; Iceland; Sweden
3 points	
2 points	Switzerland
1 point	

Points awarded to Ukraine (Final)
Score	Televote	Jury
12 points	Czechia; Israel; Poland	
10 points	Georgia; Portugal; Spain	
8 points	Cyprus; Rest of the World	Azerbaijan; Portugal
7 points	Ireland; Lithuania	
6 points	Estonia; France; Italy; Latvia; Montenegro	Georgia
5 points		Slovenia; Sweden
4 points	Azerbaijan; Denmark; Netherlands; San Marino; Sweden	Armenia; Israel; San Marino; Serbia
3 points	Germany; Slovenia	
2 points	Croatia; Finland; Norway	Croatia; Denmark; Italy; Lithuania; Spain
1 point		Norway; Switzerland

==== Points awarded by Ukraine ====
Points awarded by Ukraine (Semi-final 1)
Score	Televote
12 points	Norway
10 points	Albania
8 points	Croatia
7 points	Portugal
6 points	Netherlands
5 points	Poland
4 points	Sweden
3 points	Estonia
2 points	Iceland
1 point	Slovenia

Points awarded by Ukraine (Final)
Score	Televote	Jury
12 points	Lithuania	Germany
10 points	Norway	United Kingdom
8 points	Latvia	Italy
7 points	Italy	Switzerland
6 points	Austria	Latvia
5 points	Germany	Estonia
4 points	Sweden	Portugal
3 points	Poland	Luxembourg
2 points	Estonia	Israel
1 point	Israel	Austria

==== Detailed voting results ====
Each participating broadcaster assembles a five-member jury panel consisting of music industry professionals who are citizens of the country they represent. Each jury, and individual jury member, is required to meet a strict set of criteria regarding professional background, as well as diversity in gender and age. No member of a national jury was permitted to be related in any way to any of the competing acts in such a way that they cannot vote impartially and independently.

The following members comprised the Ukrainian jury:

- Dmytro Shurov
- Kostiantyn Bocharov (Mélovin) (represented Ukraine in the Eurovision Song Contest 2018)
- Natela Zatsarynna
- Olena Shoptenko-Ivanova
- Tetiana Reshetniak (Tayanna)

Detailed voting results from Ukraine (Semi-final 1)
R/O	Country	Televote	
R/O	Country	Rank	Points
01	Iceland	9	2
02	Poland	6	5
03	Slovenia	10	1
04	Estonia	8	3
05	Ukraine		
06	Sweden	7	4
07	Portugal	4	7
08	Norway	1	12
09	Belgium	11	
10	Azerbaijan	14	
11	San Marino	13	
12	Albania	2	10
13	Netherlands	5	6
14	Croatia	3	8
15	Cyprus	12	

Detailed voting results from Ukraine (Final)
R/O	Country	Jury							Televote	
R/O	Country	Juror A	Juror B	Juror C	Juror D	Juror E	Rank	Points	Rank	Points
01	Norway	21	13	14	21	8	16		2	10
02	Luxembourg	13	3	7	10	19	8	3	18	
03	Estonia	6	2	15	5	17	6	5	9	2
04	Israel	10	15	6	7	10	9	2	10	1
05	Lithuania	12	17	11	12	24	17		1	12
06	Spain	20	20	19	17	22	23		25	
07	Ukraine									
08	United Kingdom	2	8	1	8	2	2	10	21	
09	Austria	7	10	8	11	12	10	1	5	6
10	Iceland	25	21	17	24	25	24		16	
11	Latvia	5	4	3	6	6	5	6	3	8
12	Netherlands	11	14	16	16	18	18		12	
13	Finland	15	5	23	15	20	14		14	
14	Italy	1	7	4	1	9	3	8	4	7
15	Poland	19	22	12	20	16	22		8	3
16	Germany	4	1	5	2	1	1	12	6	5
17	Greece	22	25	9	22	21	20		24	
18	Armenia	18	12	10	13	14	15		19	
19	Switzerland	3	6	2	3	5	4	7	20	
20	Malta	16	11	25	23	15	19		15	
21	Portugal	9	9	13	4	7	7	4	13	
22	Denmark	17	18	18	18	13	21		22	
23	Sweden	8	16	22	9	11	13		7	4
24	France	14	19	20	14	4	11		17	
25	San Marino	24	23	24	25	23	25		23	
26	Albania	23	24	21	19	3	12		11	
