= Ralf Dombrowski =

German non-fiction writer and photographer

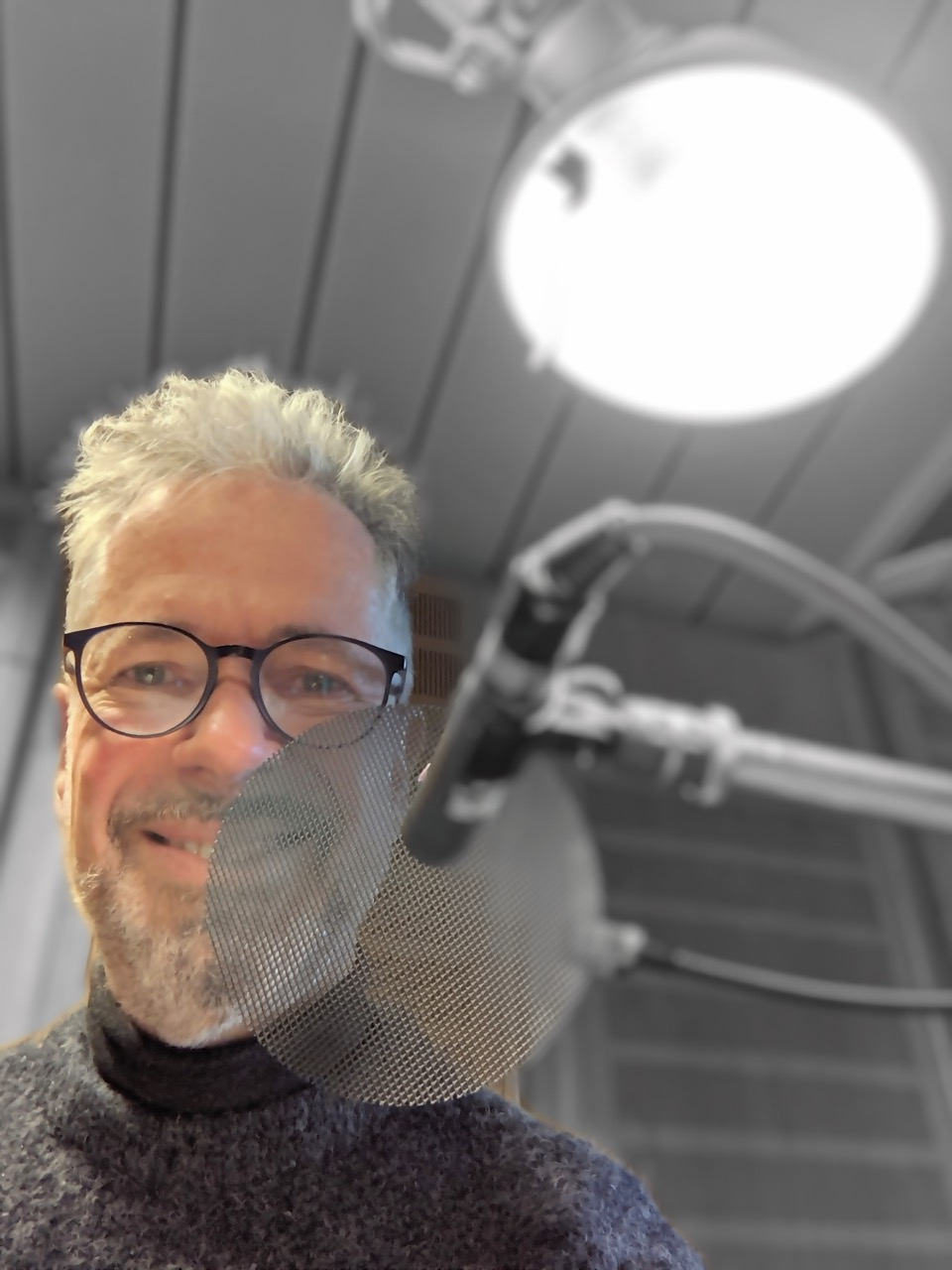
Ralf Dombrowski

Ralf Dombrowski (born 1965 in Munich, Germany) is a German professional music journalist and freelance photographer, with a focus on the German jazz music scene.

== Life and career ==
Dombrowski studied German literature, history and philosophy and occasionally plays in an amateur jazz band. He has been a music journalist since 1994, writing about jazz music and appreciation of the musical culture of Germany. From 2006 to 2008, he was editor of jazz music for the Süddeutsche Zeitung, one of Germany's leading newspapers. He regularly writes for numerous music publications, such as the Neue Musikzeitung and German jazz music magazines like Jazzzeitung, Jazz thing or the British London Jazz News.

Presenting an overview of the history of, and current jazz in Germany, he edited the online series Jazz from Germany for the German cultural organisation, the Goethe-Institut. In 2011, he curated a compilation of 18 CDs, called Dive into Jazz, presenting a wide range of jazz from both the US, Europe and other countries.

Dombrowski is the author of a musical biography of John Coltrane, a history of the jazz saxophone and of two jazz music guides, including the popular Reclam jazz collector's guide. His regular monthly radio programme Jazztime has been broadcast by the Bavarian radio network. As a member of juried competitions, he has also been active in music awards like the German Echo Music Prize or the Preis der deutschen Schallplattenkritik (German Record Critics' Award).

From 1998 to 2014, he was artistic director of the jazz festival at Schloss Elmau (European Jazztival), and from 2002 to 2004, he and Moroccan jazz musician Majid Bekkas curated the Jazz au Chellah festival in Rabat, Morocco.

His mainly black-and-white photographs of jazz musicians, concerts and festivals have been published both online as well as appearing in public exhibitions, such as at Munich's jazz venue Unterfahrt or other jazz venues in Germany. In 2019, his photograph of American jazz musician Roscoe Mitchell at the JazzFest Berlin 2018 was selected by the Jazz World Photo competition in the Czech Republic as one of the best jazz pictures of the year.

Dombrowski speaks and writes in German, English and French, which allows him to write reports about European jazz scenes in countries like Austria, Italy and France.

== Awards ==
In 2013, Dombrowski received the Award for German Jazz Journalism, where the jury praised his wide musical expertise and journalistic style as a music critic.

== Selected bibliography ==
- John Coltrane – sein Leben, seine Musik, seine Schallplatten, Oreos Verlag 2002, ISBN 3923657633
- Basis Diskothek Jazz, Reclam, 2005 (revised edition 2011), ISBN 3150183723
- Das Originale und das Originelle – Techniken kultureller Aneignung am Beispiel des Oriental Jazz. In Wolfram Knauer (ed.) Begegnungen – The World meets Jazz, Darmstädter Beiträge zur Jazzforschung, vol. 10, Wolke Verlag 2008
- Portrait Saxofon: Kultur, Praxis, Repertoire, Interpreten, Bärenreiter Verlag 2010, ISBN 978-3-7618-1840-4
- 111 Gründe, Jazz zu lieben: Eine Liebeserklärung, Schwarzkopf & Schwarzkopf, 2019, ISBN 978-3-86265-804-6

== See also ==
- German jazz
- Music journalism
