= Internationale Jazzwoche Burghausen =

International Jazz festival in Burghausen, Germany

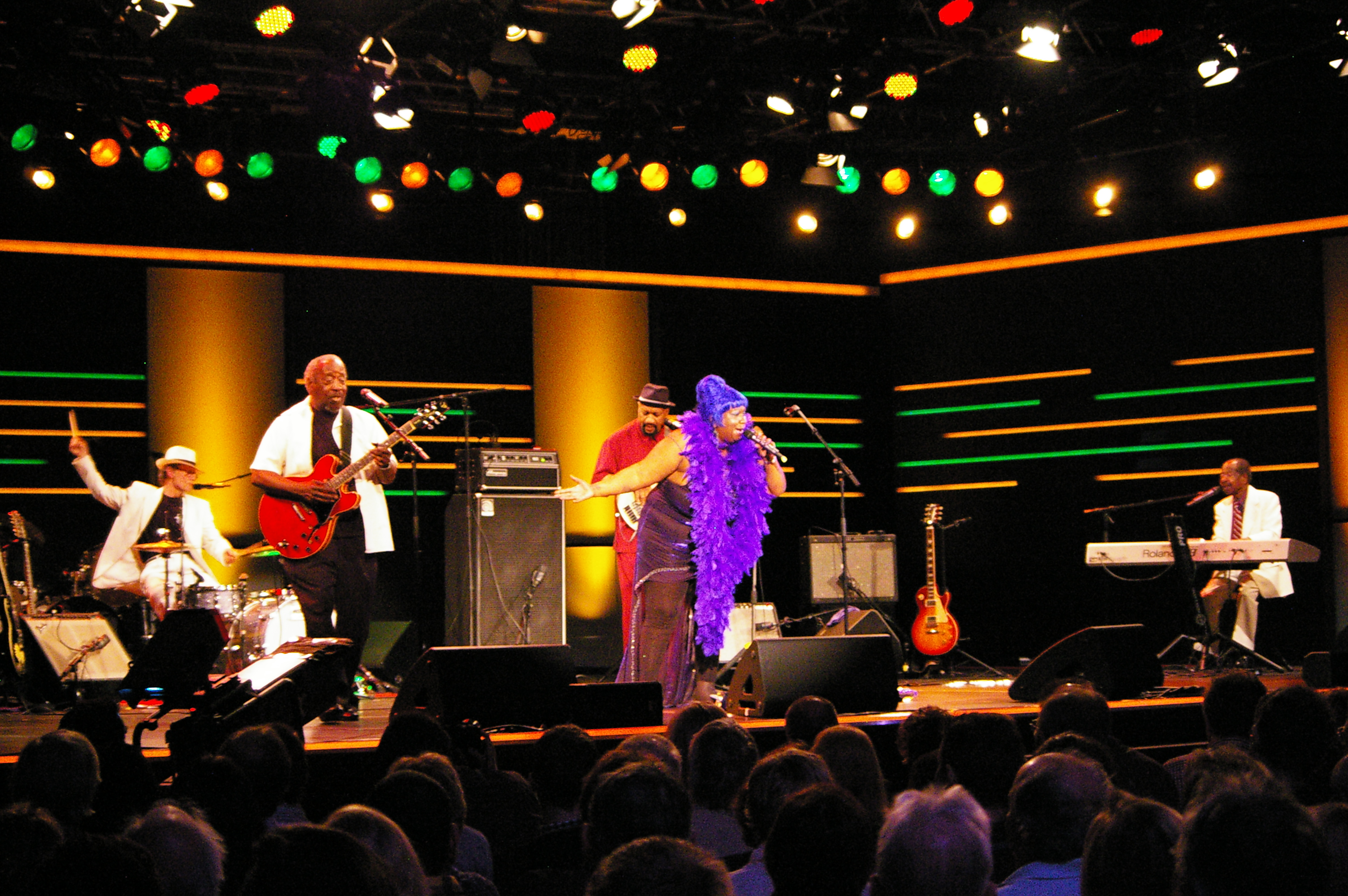
- Music Maker Revue performing at Jazzwoche Burghausen 2011
- Genre: Jazz, blues
- Locations: Wackerhalle & Stadtsaal (Burghausen), Burghausen, Altötting
- Years active: 1970–present
- Founders: Joe Viera
- Website: www.b-jazz.com

Internationale Jazzwoche Burghausen, or Burghausen International Jazz Week is a jazz festival in Burghausen, Altötting, Germany. It was founded in 1970 by Joe Viera.

== History ==
The local bailiff Helmut Viertl (1936 - 2023) founded the Birdland jazz club in Burghausen in May 1968, in the former Gasthof Zum in the old town. He had previously founded the Birdland jazz club in Neuburg an der Donau. In the winter of 1969/70, Viertl presented the idea of a festival in the jazz club with the Munich saxophonist Joe Viera as organizer (Viera was also traveling across the country at the time and presenting jazz films). In order to attract more guests, they also wanted to present pop and blues.

The first festival took place from March 3rd to 8th, 1970. Viera showed jazz films, and at the final concert Viera and Oskar Klein performed with their bands, as well as the Romanian jazz pianist János Kőrössy, who soon afterwards emigrated to the USA. The final concert was broadcast several times on Radio Free Europe. Soon afterwards, in a dispute over the musical direction, Viertl left the jazz club (which closed at the beginning of 1971 when the lease was terminated, not least because the young audience was suspected of drug use) and founded IG Jazz, with which he organized the next festival. The venue was now the Grubenbar. Another performance location was the cellar of the town hall and the Mautnerschloss after its renovation in 1977.

Well-known German jazz musicians such as Albert Mangelsdorff and Peter Herbolzheimer performed. Viera also organized jazz courses in Burghausen. In 1975 the festival also received international star guests (Dollar Brand, Oscar Peterson, Joe Pass). In 1976 the festival became even more famous when Chet Baker was arrested before his performance there and held in the local police cell until bail was posted. Also in 1976, the Dutch Swing College Band, Papa Bue's Viking Jazzband and the Old Metropolitan Band performed. Benny Waters appeared in 1977, Dizzy Gillespie in 1978, Horace Silver and the Art Ensemble of Chicago in 1979, Stephane Grappelli, McCoy Tyner, Max Roach and Mel Lewis in 1980, Clark Terry, Stan Getz and Ron Carter in 1981, Randy Brecker, Ray Brown in 1982, Bobby Hutcherson, 1983 Lester Bowie, Baden Powell, Benny Golson and Art Farmer. The festival has been regularly recorded by Bavarian Television since 1982. In 1984 they moved from the Mautnerschloss to the Wackerhalle, the meeting hall of the local Wacker Chemie AG, because it could accommodate more listeners.

At the end of the 1980s it was decided to also feature international stars in the opening concert - previously reserved for regional musicians. Dave Brubeck performed in 1988, the Modern Jazz Quartet in 1990, Al Di Meola in 1992, Jim Hall in 1993 and B. B. King in 1994. At the 25th anniversary in 1994, Helmut Viertl handed over management to his previous deputy Herbert Hebertinger. Joe Viera continued to be the artistic director. The date was moved from the second half of March to the beginning of May in 2000 and to mid-April in 2005. After Hebertinger's death in 2004, Herbert Rißel, who was previously responsible for the festival's sound technology, took over the management. From 2009 the European Burghauser Young Jazz Prize was awarded. Around 8,500 visitors came to the concerts for the 40th anniversary in 2009.

== Programme ==
The festival has established itself in Bavaria as one of the regular events of its kind with high-ranking national and international guests. An innovation since 2006 has been “Next Generation Day”, where newcomers perform on a Sunday. The first program in this series was presented in 2006 by Cyminology, Nadia Maria Fischer, Tré and Christian Krischkowsky. In 2009, the European Burghauser Young Jazz Prize was awarded for the first time as part of Jazz Week. An integral part of the jazz week is also a blues concert, where over the years artists such as Big Jay McNeely, Gene Conners, John Lee Hooker Jr., Joe Louis Walker, Dana Gillespie and Angela Brown have appeared.

The main concerts take place in the Wackerhalle, the meeting hall of the local Wacker Chemie AG. There are Jazz Nights in various bars and restaurants in the old town of Burghausen, current music films in the “Ankersaal” cinema, and jam sessions in the jazz cellar of the historic Mautnerschloss.

Numerous concerts are recorded and broadcast by Bayerischer Rundfunk. In addition to the Jazz Week, a Summer Jazz Night is held in the old town in June. Jazz courses also take place regularly in Burghausen, which were organized by the festival's artistic director, Joe Viera from 1970 until 2024.
