= Bird of Pray =

2025 single by Ziferblat

Single by Ziferblat

from the album Of Us
- Language: Ukrainian; English
- Released: 24 January 2025
- Length: 2:59 (original version); 3:00 (ESC version)
- Label: Geisha Ninja Samurai
- Songwriters: Valentyn Leshchynskyi; Daniel Leshchynskyi; Fedir Khodakov
- Producer: Ziferblat

Ziferblat singles chronology
| "Doteper i nazavzhdy" (2024) | "Bird of Pray" (2025) |

Music video
- "Bird of Pray" on YouTube

Eurovision Song Contest 2025 entry
- Country: Ukraine
- Artist: Ziferblat
- Languages: Ukrainian, English
- Composers: Valentyn Leshchynskyi; Daniel Leshchynskyi; Fedir Khodakov
- Lyricist: Valentyn Leshchynskyi

Finals performance
- Semi-final result: 1st
- Semi-final points: 137
- Final result: 9th
- Final points: 218

Entry chronology
- ◄ "Teresa & Maria" (2024)
- "Ridnym" (2026) ►

"Bird of Pray" is a song by Ukrainian alternative rock band Ziferblat. It was written by band members Valentyn Leshchynskyi, Daniel Leshchynskyi and Fedir Khodakov, with production credited to Ziferblat. The song was released on 24 January 2025 and represented Ukraine in the Eurovision Song Contest 2025. Written by the entire band, it details the separation between Ukrainian citizens divided in the Russian invasion of Ukraine. The song gained ninth place in the song contest with 218 points. The song gained mixed reviews. Some praised its tone, retro style, and multiple elements while others criticized the "mismatch" between the numerous verses and its poor chance to connect emotionally.

== Background and composition ==
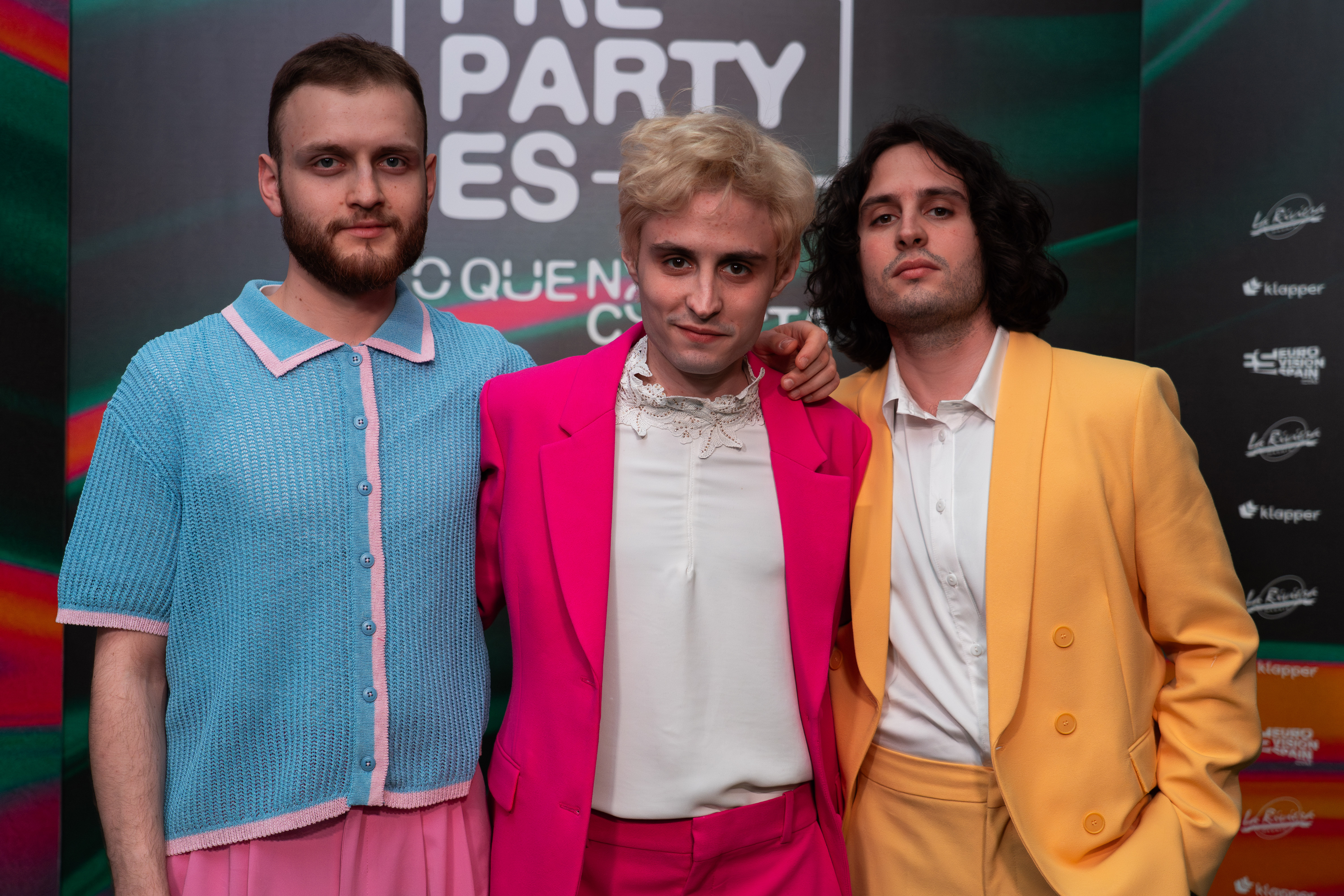
Ziferblat at the Photocall of the Preparty 2025 in Madrid

"Bird of Pray" was written by twin brothers Danilo and Valentin Leshchynski and Fedir Khodakov, members of the group Ziferblat. They said that the band "wanted to do something new", stating that they desired to show a large audience their familiarity with Ukrainian traditional music; they likened their song to Queen and The Beatles. Valentin started writing the song in June 2024 with his acoustic guitar. After composing the music, he wrote the lyrics, imagining a bird coming to him. Eventually, the entire band helped compose the song and finish it.

The song discussed the separation between Ukrainian civilians who have been divided in the Russian invasion of Ukraine. "Bird" in the title represents the insecure connection between those separated in the invasion. This influenced the song's title to be "Bird of Pray" instead of "Bird of Prey". The lyrics have Ukrainian and English portions and symbolize freedom, shared in the chorus: "And I call you/Fly/Bird/I'm begging you/Begging you please just/live/share." The song was intended to continue the theme of their entry in the 2024 Ukrainian Eurovision selection "Place I Call Home". In an interview with ESCBubble, Valentyn added that the song shows "love to one's land and the desire to share it with others" as well as the exposure of the realities Ukrainians face daily. Eva Frantz of Yle called the song a mixture of progg, rock, musical theatre, vocal harmonies with "1970s vibes". After winning Vidbir, Ziferblat decided to revamp the song once again for Eurovision. Adding orchestral parts in the chorus as well as a lightened chorus, Valeria Gazhala of Television News Service described the track better following the revamp.

== Music video and promotion ==
On 23 January 2025, Ziferblat released the music video for "Bird of Pray". The song gained more than 100,000 listens within the first 16 hours. Directed by Ilya Dutsyk, the music video immerses the viewer between two parallel planes, according to Novyi Kanal: the first is memories of home, evoking a mix of joy and sadness, while the latter is a search for home. In April, Ziferblat partnered with the Serhiy Prytula Humanitarian Foundation to purchase equipment for humanitarian demining through a fundraiser. On 18 and 19 April, they performed at the Pre-Party ES. On 25 April, Ziferblat performed the song at the Eurovision in Concert—described as the largest promotional concert for Eurovision—in Amsterdam; 30 representatives out of the 37 participants in the contest joined the concert. During their speech, they mentioned a missile attack on Kryvyi Rih.

== Critical reception ==
Eva Frantz of Yle rated the song 9 out of 10, stating that Ukraine manages to highlight its desolate situation without asking for sympathy. The team of Wiwibloggs rated "Bird of Pray" 5.93, averaged between 17 reviewers. Some reviewers supported the song, highlighting the "gorgeous and mystical" tone of the harmony with the backing vocals, and added that the song remained unique and filled with "political tones". On the other hand, reviewers mentioned the "mismatch" between the harmonical verses and the other ones while reporting a lack of "musical intrigue". Out of the 37 songs in Eurovision, the song was ranked 23rd place by the team. Mark Savage of BBC reported that the song prolonged Ukraine's "astonishing run in high-quality entries" and compared the song's composition to the 70s band The Cars, adding that the lyrics were "full of hope" for a reunion with Ukrainians' loved ones. Glen Weldon of NPR stated that the song was fascinating yet described it as "six different songs mashed together" and added that the televoters would not be able to "hook into it" on first listen.

Jon O'Brien of Vulture ranked "Bird of Pray" 20th out of 37 songs in Eurovision 2025, stating that its '70s glam rock and banshee wails "were unlikely to connect emotionally", further adding that it would not qualify if performed by other nations. Angelica Frey of The Guardian placed the song in the top 10 best entries in the 2025 edition of the song contest, expressing that the song balances numerous elements, particularly an all-female choir, rock anthemics, and the theatrics of Danilo; Frey further stated that the lyrics provide a "sombre" contrast to the music. Rob Picheta of CNN ranked the song 12th out of 26 participants in the grand final, stating that the song is "bold" and that the costumes were "pure glam rock". Furthermore, Picheta reported that the melodies zoom around and "never quite end up where you'd expect." Nemo, the winner of Eurovision 2024, placed the song in their top 5 favorites of the 2025 contest, stating that the song was interesting musically and added that it was "very daring and bold."

== Eurovision Song Contest 2025 ==
=== Vidbir 2025 ===
Vidbir 2025 was the ninth edition of Vidbir that selected the Ukrainian entry for the Eurovision Song Contest 2025. The competition consisted of a final on 8 February 2025 and took place in Kyiv. The selection of the entries that competed the national final and ultimately the Ukrainian Eurovision entry took place over three stages. In the first stage, artists and songwriters had the opportunity to apply for the competition through an online submission form. Twenty acts were longlisted and announced on 11 December 2024. The second stage involved the longlisted artists attending a scheduled audition. Up to nine acts were selected, while an additional act was selected from an online selection. The third stage was the televised final, which took place in February 2025 and featured the acts vying to represent Ukraine in Basel. The winner was selected via the combination of votes from a public vote and an expert jury, the latter of which will be selected by the public. After passing the initial selection phase, Ziferblat were confirmed among the 10 finalists of the competition with the song "Bird of Pray" on 20 December 2024. Eventually, the combined vote of the public and jury crowned it the winner and national representative on the Eurovision stage in Basel, gaining 19 points.

=== At Eurovision ===
The Eurovision Song Contest 2025 took place at St. Jakobshalle in Basel, Switzerland, and consisted of two semi-finals held on the respective dates of 13 and 15 May and the final on 17 May 2025. Ukraine was drawn to perform fifth in the semi-finals, performing in the first half of the first semi-final. The staging was directed by Mariia Korostelova while costumes were designed by Ukrainian designer Ivan Frolov.

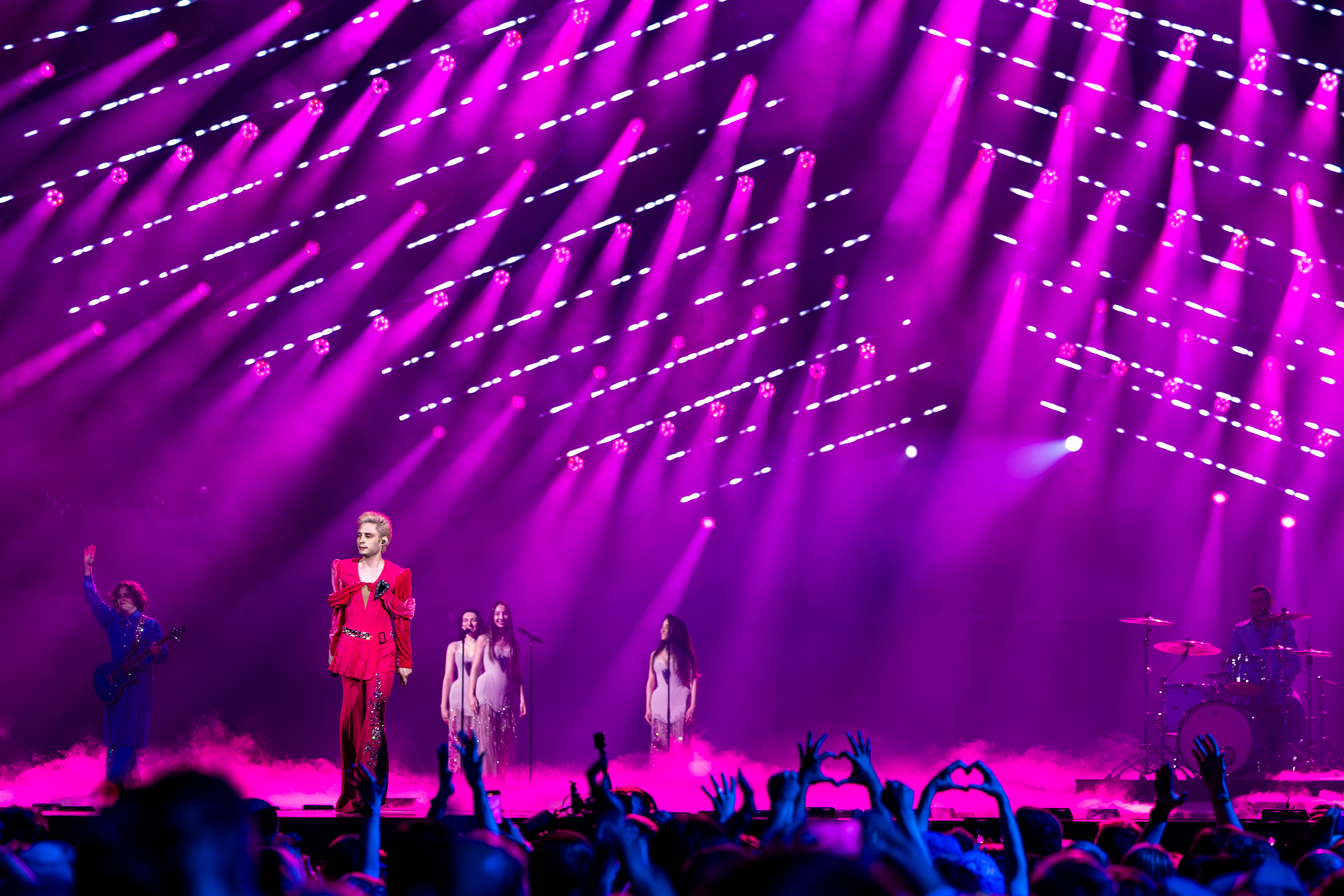
Ziferblat performing at the Eurovision Song Contest

Through the director, major changes were made to the staging from the original Vidbir performance. Intense rehearsals were participated on both in person and online to ease logistical challenges due to having a team outside of Ukraine. One of the backing singers was Khrystyna Starykova, a defeated contestant at the 2025 Vidbir national selection. The performance was described as retro-style; bathed in soft pink light, a pair of giant wings unfurled at the climax. The LED walls contained pink and green graphics which matched the timing of the music. Costumes also matched the style with a pink, blue, and turquoise hue for Ziferblat while the backing singers wore golden pantsuits with the three members of the band as well as three backing singers. As the performance ended, crowds roared at the arena according to Television News Service. Ziferblat gained first place in the first semi-final with 137 points, qualifying for the final.

Alexandra Koster of Special Broadcasting Service (SBS) said that "it literally looks like someone has placed a [...] schmear of Vaseline over the camera lens" while adding that her favorite part was the blackouts which "made me believe I had a power outage." Carlos Marcos of El País described, in Spanish, the song as worthy of seventies aromas, concluding that the participation as meritorious. Neil McCormick of The Daily Telegraph described the song as "another surprisingly upbeat warzone anthem" while comparing their attires to "one of those friendly alien races that Doctor Who's hero used to protect from invasion" in the 1970s with little budget. Will Hodgkinson of The Times compared Ziferblat to a "blonde golden boy, distinctly Elvish in a Lord of the Rings Way," adding that various "heavenly voiced, flaxen-haired" women were brought to back him, "as every elf should."

At the grand final on 17 May, Ukraine performed 7th, after Spain's Melody and before the United Kingdom's Remember Monday, performing a repeat of their performance. After the results were announced, the band received 9th place with 218 points: 60 from the jury and 158 from the audience. The highest the country placed ranked in jury votes was first without receiving 12 points, the most a country gave was eight points from Azerbaijan and Portugal. In televotes, the country gained three 12 points from Czechia, Israel, and Poland.

== Credits and personnel ==
Credits are adapted from Apple Music (Malaysia).

- Valentin Leshchynski – composer, lyrics, producer
- Danilo Leshchynski – composer
- Fedir Khodakov – composer
- Vlad Kurach – arranger
- Vitaliy Kandyba – arranger

== Charts ==
=== Weekly charts ===
Weekly chart performance for "Bird of Pray"
| Chart (2025) | Peak position |
|---|---|
| Lithuania (AGATA) | 15 |
| Sweden Heatseeker (Sverigetopplistan) | 7 |
| Ukraine (FDR Media) | 16 |
| Ukraine Airplay (TopHit) | 34 |

=== Monthly charts ===
Monthly chart performance for "Bird of Pray"
| Chart (2025) | Position |
|---|---|
| Ukraine Airplay (TopHit) | 51 |
