= Romania in the Eurovision Song Contest 2026 =

- Eurovision Song Contest 2026
- Participating broadcaster: Televiziunea Română (TVR)
- Country: Romania
- Selection process: Selecția națională 2026
- Selection date: 4 March 2026

Competing entry
- Song: "Choke Me"
- Artist: Alexandra Căpitănescu
- Songwriters: Alexandra Căpitănescu; Călin-Alexandru Grăjdan; Elvis Silitră; Ștefan Condrea

Placement
- Semi-final result: Qualified (2nd, 234 points)
- Final result: 3rd, 296 points

Participation chronology

Romania was represented at the Eurovision Song Contest 2026 with the song "Choke Me", written by Alexandra Căpitănescu, Călin-Alexandru Grăjdan, Elvis Silitră and Ștefan Condrea, and performed by Căpitănescu herself. The Romanian participating broadcaster, Televiziunea Română (TVR), organised the national final Selecția națională 2026 in order to select its entry for the contest.

Romania was drawn to compete in the second semi-final of the Eurovision Song Contest which took place on 14 May 2026. Performing during the show in position 3, "Choke Me" was announced among the top 10 entries of the second semi-final and hence qualified to compete in the final. In the final, Romania placed 3rd with 296 points. This equalled the country's best result in the contest, previously achieved in 2005 and 2010.

== Background ==
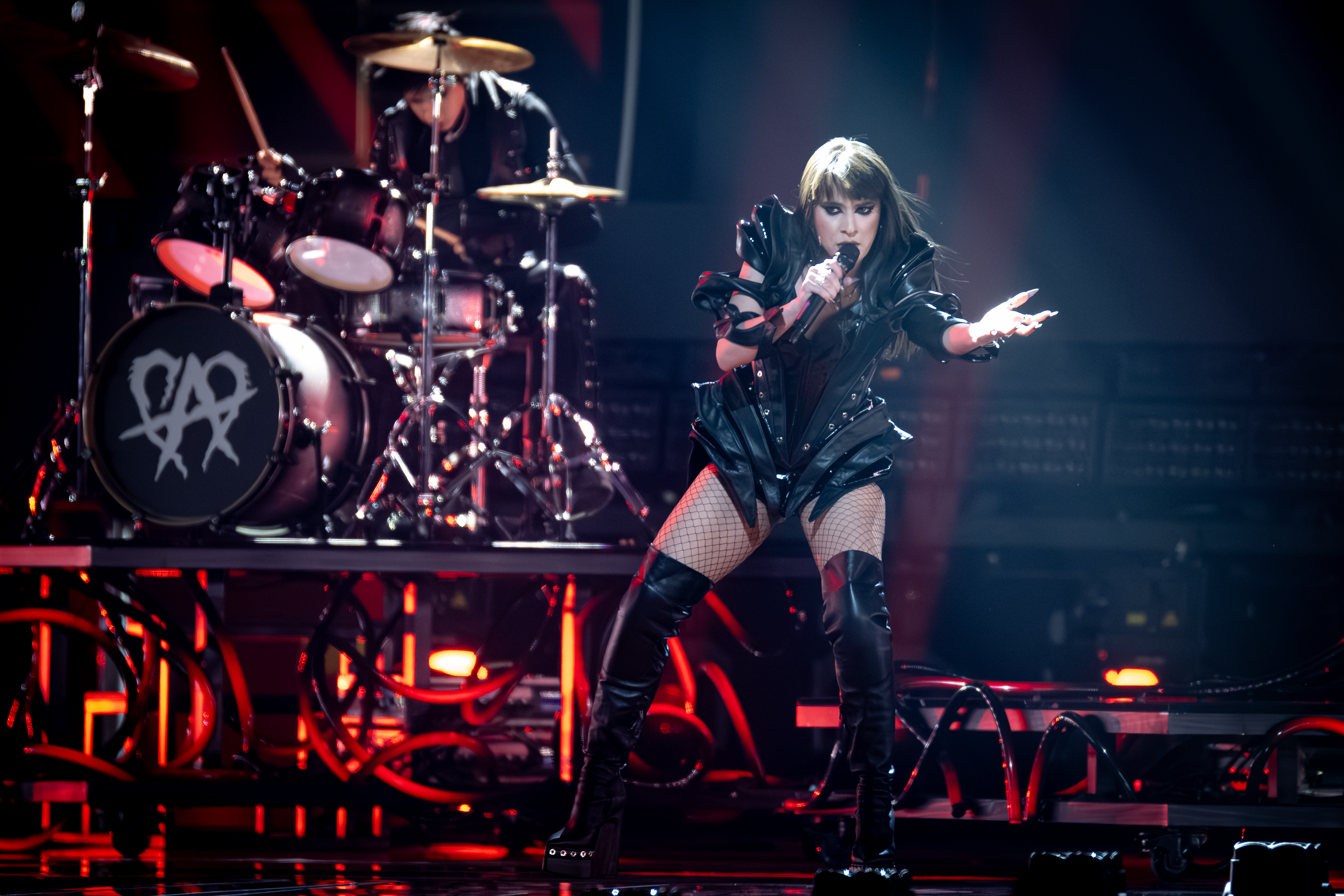
Căpitănescu placed third in the Eurovision Song Contest 2026 with the song "Choke Me."

Prior to the 2026 contest, Televiziunea Română (TVR) had participated in the Eurovision Song Contest representing Romania twenty-three times since its first entry in 1994. Its highest placing in the contest, to this point, had been third place, achieved on two occasions: in 2005 with the song "Let Me Try" performed by Luminița Anghel and Sistem and in 2010 with the song "Playing with Fire" performed by Paula Seling and Ovi. The country had never failed to qualify for the final until 2018, after which it experienced a decline in results and only qualified once in five participations. In 2023, "D.G.T. (Off and On)" performed by Theodor Andrei failed to qualify for the final.

As part of its duties as participating broadcaster, TVR organises the selection of its entry in the Eurovision Song Contest and broadcasts the event in the country. The broadcaster had consistently selected its entry through the format Selecția națională, consisting of televised finals to choose the performer, song or both to compete at Eurovision, with the exception of 2021. Romania did not participate in the contest in 2024 and 2025 due to financial difficulties. In April 2025, the general director of TVR, Dan Turturică, stated the country would return once the relationship between TVR and local music producers is "reset". TVR confirmed its intention to take part in the 2026 contest on 30 October 2025, announcing in January 2026 that Selecția națională would be held again to select its entry.

== Before Eurovision ==
=== Selecția națională 2026 ===
Selecția națională 2026 was the national final format developed by TVR in order to select its entry for the Eurovision Song Contest 2026. The competition consisted of a semi-final phase and a final, and was held between 9 February and 4 March 2026 at the TVR studios in Bucharest. Both phases were broadcast online via the streaming platform tvrplus.ro, with the final also aired on TVR 1 and TVR Info. All broadcasts were also avalaible with optional interpretation in Romanian Sign Language by Andreea Darie, Lena Dermengiu and Marieta Negru.

==== Format ====
The selection took place in four stages: the received entries were first assessed by an expert committee on 5 and 6 February 2026; 68 of them (later reduced to 67) were selected to be performed at a semi-final, where the selected artists performed their songs in front of a jury over three days on 9, 10 and 11 February 2026 as part of a series of sessions titled Atelier deschis Eurovision 2026 ("Eurovision 2026 open workshop"), after which ten finalists were selected and announced on 12 February 2026 during the evening broadcast of the news program Telejurnal; as part of an online wildcard round, two additional finalists (originally planned to be one) were selected from among five artists who did not advance from the previous phase based on the number of views of their semi-final performances on YouTube and were announced on 15 February 2026; at the final, which was held on 4 March 2026, the winner was determined exclusively by a jury vote.

The jury for the competition was composed of singer Andreea Bălan, composer Andrei Tudor, music producers Marius Dia and Cristian "Monoir" Tarcea, and journalists Elena Popa, Doru Ionescu and Cristian Marica Rădoi.

==== Competing entries ====
On 14 January 2026, TVR published the rules of the competition, opening a window for interested artists and composers to submit their entries until 2 February. Each submission was subject to a fee of 500 lei (€98). At the end of the submission period, 101 entries had been received.

On 6 February 2026, the list of the 68 artists and songs participating in the semi-final was released by TVR. Among the selected competing artists were Ciro de Luca and Wrs, who represented Romania in 2007 (as part of the group Todomondo) and 2022 respectively, as well as Dya, who represented Romania in the 2006 junior contest as part of the group New Star Music. Zya appeared on the original list released by TVR but withdrew on 9 February.

Results of the semi-final – 12 February 2026
Artist	Song	Songwriter(s)	Result
Adriana Moraru	"Get Your Freak Out"	Adriana Moraru	Eliminated
Alejandro Zandes and Emil Rengle	"Bailando solo"	Alejandro Fernandez-Holt; Bogdan Samoilenco; Emil Rengle; George Radu; Teodor Humă; Tudor Gomeajă	Finalist
Alex Maxim	"Do Do Dance"	Alex Maxim; Antonius Buzatu; Claudiu Bulete	Eliminated
Alex Tuga and Amary	"1 2 3 – Un deux troi"	Alexandru Gabriel Tudor; Ionuț Catană	Eliminated
Alexa and Aria Moon	"Iele"	Alexandra Crăescu; Ana-Maria Ștefan; Daniel Antonescu; Ovidiu Cernăuțeanu	Online wildcard
Alexandra Căpitănescu	"Choke Me"	Alexandra Căpitănescu; Călin-Alexandru Grăjdan; Elvis Silitră; Ștefan Condrea	Finalist
Alexandra Ungureanu	"TikTok Tastic"	Andrew Edward William Gray; Clive Lukover	Eliminated
Alin Stoica	"Iubește-mă pe mine"	Aurelian Dincă	Eliminated
Alina Amon	"Grand prix"	Alina Amon	Eliminated
Ana Maria Moldovan	"Aripi să zbor"	Ana Maria Codruța Moldovan	Eliminated
Anais Vacariu	"Cer divin"	Anais Vacariu	Eliminated
Andreea Bănică	"Marinero"	Theea-Eliza-Ioana Miculescu	Eliminated
Andreea D and Sandro Machado	"Chiquita bonita (favorita)"	Andreea Elena Dorobanțu Păduraru; Silviu Marian Păduraru	Eliminated
Andreea Vîlcan	"Fete cu batic"	Alex-Lucian Cioată; Andreea Pavel-Vîlcan; Daniel Baciu-Antonescu	Eliminated
Andrew Rope	"Home"	Alexandru-Ioan Mereuță; Mihai-Andrei Ropotă; Petru Bîrlădeanu	Eliminated
Anna Michael	"Get Nasty"	Anamaria Mihali	Eliminated
Antonio Pican	"Humans"	Cezar-Alexandru Gună; Costel-Pavel Dominteanu; Ioan-Antonio Pican	Online wildcard
Bby Mario	"Ándale"	Eduard Mario Tudor	Eliminated
Bella Santiago	"Romania Queen"	Alexandru Luft; Resciebelle Barrios Santiago	Eliminated
Beni Mihai	"Angels"	Beniamin Mihai	Eliminated
Bianca Tilici	"Keep Fighting"	Bastian Voelkel; Bianca Ana Maria Tilici; Bjarke Sørensen	Eliminated
Bogdan Medvedi	"Broken Heart"	Sebastian Gabriel Tudor	Online wildcard
Brian Left	"Videogame"	Javi Leon	Eliminated
Ciro de Luca	"Ti amo (u ie ah aha)"	Ciro de Luca Bossa	Eliminated
Cristina Ene	"Different Flags, Same Dreams"	Cristina Ene	Eliminated
Dan	"Wear My Ring"	Dan Cociș	Eliminated
Dayana	"Butterfly"	Daniel Antonescu; Diana Sturza; Ovidiu Cernăuțeanu	Eliminated
Direcția 5	"Două povești"	Dinu Olărașu; Marian Ionescu	Eliminated
Dya	"Thunder"	Emma White; Kjetil Mørland; Oscar Air	Eliminated
Edward Maya, LavBbe and Costi	"Everybody Needs Somebody"	Constantin Ioniță; Lavinia-Anamaria Călin; Olaf Stephen Blackwood; Orville Richard Burrell	Finalist
Emy Alupei	"Tili Bom"	Andra Brebu; Bianca Dragomir; Cristian-Ștefan Prăjescu	Finalist
Hold On	"My Medicine"	Ioan Bîgea; Vlad Arsene	Eliminated
Hvnds	"Dor"	Alexandru-Florin Hălmăgean; Cătălin-Ionuț Maftei; Radu-Ionuț Cîmpeanu	Finalist
Impact	"Bengalo"	Claudiu-Rareș Timiș; Marius-Alexandru Mirică; Silvia-Cristina Bălan	Online wildcard
ImstillFranci	"Serenade"	Alexander Zuckowski; Daniel Joseph Healy; Ștefania Francesca Aurelia Hojda	Eliminated
Ioana Muntianu, Octav Ioan and Cezar Cazanoi	"Du-mă, dor"	Cezar Cazanoi; Ioana Muntianu	Eliminated
Joshua	"Help Me Stop the Time"	Alexandru Voican; Lajos Levente Simon; Rareș-Marius Bereș; Zsolt-Attila Török	Eliminated
Kadjavsi	"Heavensground"	Nikita Andrei Dembinski	Eliminated
Kame	"Cântă, Românie!"	Maria Bîrsan	Eliminated
Kony Band	"Încă o zi"	Cornel-Valentin Oprea; Elena-Mălina Paraschiv	Eliminated
Liloa	"In the Matrix of Your Eyes"	Joël Grignard; Olesea Cegodari	Eliminated
Mara Berechet	"Beyond the Sun"	David Andrei Burlacu; Ionuț Adrian Radu; Ionuț Silivestru; Virginia Maxim	Eliminated
Marcus	"Self Control"	Andrei Mihai; Dan Healy; Lucian Naste; Marcus Mureșan	Eliminated
Mihai Cosmescu	"Crawl Back Down"	Mihai Cosmescu	Eliminated
Mikayla	"Breathing"	Andrew-Heydon Terinte; Cezar-Alexandru Gună; Maria Catrinel Ciornei; Mikayla Julianna Kachur	Eliminated
Missed Call	"Take Care of My Soul"	Alexandru Cherecheș; Cosmin Gafițescu; Radu Săndulescu; Răzvan Nica	Eliminated
Mizantrop	"Trădător"	Aris Nichi; Ioan-Tudor Gavrilă; Rareș Mihăilă	Eliminated
Monica Odagiu	"Fereastră pentru un orb"	Ionuț Adrian Radu; Lazăr Cercel	Finalist
Olivia Addams	"Croco"	Adriana Livia Opriș; Diana Maria Șerban; Ioana-Diana Hrișcă; Octavian Ioachim Petre	Finalist
Patricia Thomits	"Bonsoir amore"	Elvin Dandel	Eliminated
Paula Leahu	"Warrior Pose"	Abigail Hercules; Paula Leahu; Robbe Ghysen; Shalini Kumar	Eliminated
Razi	"Hello Darling"	Andra-Cristiana Herța; Anhelina Antoniuk; Mihai Mirea; Răzvan-Cristian Drăgan; Vitalii Tsymbal	Eliminated
Robert Lukian	"Fire to the Lies"	Albin Håkan Ljung; Lucian Albert Victor Nagy; Robert Claudio Lukian	Finalist
Romeo Zaharia	"Forever Yours"	Arnar Astradsson; Evangelos Doukoutselis	Eliminated
Ruxit	"Besame mucho"	Maria-Ruxandra Tomulesei; Mity-Roberto-Răzvan Tanu	Eliminated
Save	"Rollin' (Let Them Know)"	Ramzi Emile Khuri; Stelian Savu	Eliminated
Silvia Tache	"Almost There"	Silvia Tache	Eliminated
Stremi	"Lelele"	Alexandru Stremițeanu; Eduard Ungureanu	Eliminated
Taylor	"A Brand New Day"	Adrian Marius Ionescu; Codruț Valentin Croitoru	Eliminated
The Twins	"Think of You"	Eric McCallaghan; Linda Persson; Ylva Persson	Eliminated
Tianno	"My Game"	Mircea Prusan; Virgil Dulceanu	Eliminated
Trupa Othello	"Soarele și luna"	Florentin Milcof	Eliminated
Ukka	"Confidence"	Daniel Florin Sfichi; Elena Daria Cojocaru	Eliminated
Vanu	"Therapy Enemy"	Andrei Dragu; Cristian-Ștefan Prăjescu; Eberhard-Cristian Papp; Floris-Răzvan Alexa; Nicolae-Bogdan Stănică; Ross Thomas William Woodhouse; Șerban-Ionuț Georgescu; Theodor-Ștefan Scrioșteanu	Finalist
Wrs	"All the Way"	Andrei Ursu; Costel-Pavel Dominteanu	Online wildcard
Yguana	"Happy Birthday"	Cristian-Ștefan Prăjescu; Ioana-Diana Hrișcă	Finalist
Zya (Note: Despite the homonymy, the songs are performed by different artists.)	"Cu a mea"	Izabela Bădiță; Oana Dumitrache	Withdrawn
Zya	"Ghost"	Monica Cherecheș	Eliminated

Online wildcard – 15 February 2026
Artist	Song	Result
Alexa and Aria Moon	"Iele"	Eliminated
Antonio Pican	"Humans"	Finalist
Bogdan Medvedi	"Broken Heart"	Eliminated
Impact	"Bengalo"	Eliminated
Wrs	"All the Way"	Finalist

==== Final ====
The final took place on 4 March 2026. The show was hosted by Giulia Nahmany and Daniel Nuță, with Laura Fronoiu and Marius Popa hosting segments from the audience, and Alexandra Gavrilă, Iulian Selea and Răzvan Petre hosting backstage segments. In addition to the competing entries, juror Andreea Bălan also performed as an interval act.

Final – 4 March 2026
R/O	Artist	Song	Points	Place
1	Emy Alupei	"Tili Bom"	53	5
2	Robert Lukian	"Fire to the Lies"	53	4
3	Vanu	"Therapy Enemy"	19	11
4	Edward Maya, LavBbe and Costi	"Everybody Needs Somebody"	16	12
5	Yguana	"Happy Birthday"	31	9
6	Hvnds	"Dor"	69	2
7	Antonio Pican	"Humans"	24	10
8	Wrs	"All the Way"	49	6
9	Olivia Addams	"Croco"	35	8
10	Monica Odagiu	"Fereastră pentru un orb"	49	7
11	Alexandra Căpitănescu	"Choke Me"	82	1
12	Alejandro Zandes and Emil Rengle	"Bailando solo"	66	3

Detailed jury votes
R/O	Song	Juror							Total
R/O	Song	1	2	3	4	5	6	7	Total
1	"Tili Bom"	8	8	5	8	4	8	12	53
2	"Fire to the Lies"	5	11	9	7	5	10	6	53
3	"Therapy Enemy"	1	5	4	1	3	3	2	19
4	"Everybody Needs Somebody"	7	2	1	3	1	1	1	16
5	"Happy Birthday"	2	4	7	5	2	7	4	31
6	"Dor"	10	9	11	10	11	11	7	69
7	"Humans"	4	3	3	2	7	2	3	24
8	"All the Way"	9	1	6	11	8	6	8	49
9	"Croco"	3	7	2	4	6	4	9	35
10	"Fereastră pentru un orb"	6	10	8	6	9	5	5	49
11	"Choke Me"	11	12	12	12	12	12	11	82
12	"Bailando solo"	12	6	10	9	10	9	10	66

=== Controversy ===
"Choke Me" drew controversy for its title and subject matter, with those being criticised for allegedly glamorising strangulation and sexual violence. Campaigners against sexual violence described the song as "reckless and dangerous," drawing specific focus on the lyrics "I want you to choke me" and "make my lungs explode". Claire McGlynn, a professor at Durham University, claimed that the song was "playing fast and loose with young women’s lives". In response, Căpitănescu argued that the song's message was metaphorical and is about being overwhelmed by emotion and self-doubt. On 18 March, TVR released a statement defending Căpitănescu and the song, stating that the song's stage concept was intended to "highlight the metaphorical nature" and "exclude any literal interpretation of the lyrics."

== At Eurovision ==
The Eurovision Song Contest 2026 took place at the Wiener Stadthalle in Vienna, Austria, and consisted of two semi-finals held on the respective dates of 12 and 14 May and the final on 16 May 2026. All nations with the exceptions of the host country and the "Big Four" (France, Germany, Italy and the United Kingdom) were required to qualify from one of two semi-finals in order to compete for the final; the top ten countries from each semi-final progressed to the final. On 12 January 2026, an allocation draw was held to determine which of the two semi-finals, as well as which half of the show, each country performed in; the European Broadcasting Union (EBU) split up the competing countries into different pots based on voting patterns from previous contests, with countries with favourable voting histories put into the same pot. Romania was scheduled for the first half of the second semi-final.

=== Voting ===
==== Points awarded to Romania ====
Points awarded to Romania (Semi-final 2)
Score	Televote	Jury
12 points	Czechia; Ukraine	Luxembourg
10 points	Austria; Cyprus; France; Luxembourg; Rest of the World; United Kingdom	Czechia
8 points	Bulgaria; Latvia	Norway
7 points	Australia; Azerbaijan; Norway; Switzerland	Malta
6 points	Armenia	Australia; Austria; Ukraine
5 points	Denmark; Malta	Azerbaijan; Denmark
4 points		Armenia; Latvia; Switzerland; United Kingdom
3 points	Albania	France
2 points		Albania
1 point		Cyprus

Points awarded to Romania (Final)
Score	Televote	Jury
12 points	Moldova	Luxembourg
10 points	Belgium; Bulgaria; Finland; Italy; Lithuania; Luxembourg; Poland; Ukraine	
8 points	France; United Kingdom	Czechia
7 points	Cyprus; Czechia; Georgia; Norway; Portugal; Rest of the World; Serbia	San Marino
6 points	Australia; Azerbaijan; Greece; Latvia; San Marino	Norway
5 points	Albania; Armenia; Croatia; Malta	Italy; Poland
4 points	Denmark; Estonia; Switzerland	Israel
3 points	Austria; Israel; Montenegro; Sweden	Azerbaijan; Moldova; Ukraine
2 points		Greece; Latvia
1 point	Germany	Denmark; Portugal; Sweden; Switzerland

==== Points awarded by Romania ====
Points awarded by Romania (Semi-final 2)
Score	Televote	Jury
12 points	Albania	Czechia
10 points	Bulgaria	Australia
8 points	Norway	Switzerland
7 points	Switzerland	Denmark
6 points	Czechia	Ukraine
5 points	Ukraine	Norway
4 points	Denmark	Latvia
3 points	Cyprus	Bulgaria
2 points	Malta	Luxembourg
1 point	Australia	Malta

Points awarded by Romania (Final)
Score	Televote	Jury
12 points	Moldova	Australia
10 points	Serbia	Moldova
8 points	Bulgaria	Czechia
7 points	Italy	Denmark
6 points	Israel	Israel
5 points	Albania	Norway
4 points	Ukraine	Bulgaria
3 points	Greece	Malta
2 points	Croatia	Croatia
1 point	Australia	Ukraine

==== Detailed voting results ====
Each participating broadcaster assembles a seven-member jury panel consisting of music industry professionals who are citizens of the country they represent and two of which have to be between 18 and 25 years old. Each jury, and individual jury member, is required to meet a strict set of criteria regarding professional background, as well as diversity in gender and age. No member of a national jury was permitted to be related in any way to any of the competing acts in such a way that they cannot vote impartially and independently. The individual rankings of each jury member as well as the nation's televoting results were released shortly after the grand final.

The following members comprised the Romanian jury:

- Anca Lupeș
- Crina Mardare
- Cristian Marica-Rădoi
- Denis Giuliano Costea
- Dora Gaitanovici
- Gabriel Scîrlet
- Francesca Elena Nicolescu

Detailed voting results from Romania (Semi-final 2)
R/O	Country	Jury									Televote	
R/O	Country	Juror A	Juror B	Juror C	Juror D	Juror E	Juror F	Juror G	Rank	Points	Rank	Points
01	Bulgaria	12	6	6	6	6	4	10	8	3	2	10
02	Azerbaijan	14	13	13	13	11	6	11	13		14	
03	Romania											
04	Luxembourg	2	7	11	11	5	10	12	9	2	13	
05	Czechia	1	5	1	2	2	2	5	1	12	5	6
06	Armenia	6	9	9	12	14	9	7	11		12	
07	Switzerland	8	8	4	7	1	5	2	3	8	4	7
08	Cyprus	13	14	14	14	12	12	13	14		8	3
09	Latvia	10	12	7	9	9	3	1	7	4	11	
10	Denmark	3	2	5	5	10	14	3	4	7	7	4
11	Australia	11	1	2	1	3	1	6	2	10	10	1
12	Ukraine	5	3	10	3	8	11	4	5	6	6	5
13	Albania	9	11	12	4	13	8	14	12		1	12
14	Malta	7	10	8	10	4	13	8	10	1	9	2
15	Norway	4	4	3	8	7	7	9	6	5	3	8

Detailed voting results from Romania (Final)
R/O	Country	Jury									Televote	
R/O	Country	Juror A	Juror B	Juror C	Juror D	Juror E	Juror F	Juror G	Rank	Points	Rank	Points
01	Denmark	7	13	3	2	5	13	5	4	7	13	
02	Germany	19	2	15	13	17	19	17	15		21	
03	Israel	13	19	1	3	3	6	20	5	6	5	6
04	Belgium	18	18	11	21	11	15	16	19		24	
05	Albania	8	20	21	16	13	4	24	17		6	5
06	Greece	11	11	12	22	23	3	15	13		8	3
07	Ukraine	4	9	8	18	12	7	13	10	1	7	4
08	Australia	15	3	4	1	1	2	2	1	12	10	1
09	Serbia	2	21	20	15	16	24	14	16		2	10
10	Malta	12	12	5	4	15	20	3	8	3	19	
11	Czechia	1	6	2	7	2	11	10	3	8	15	
12	Bulgaria	14	5	6	5	6	5	9	7	4	3	8
13	Croatia	5	10	14	11	9	12	4	9	2	9	2
14	United Kingdom	21	23	24	24	24	23	22	24		22	
15	France	9	14	17	9	4	8	12	11		12	
16	Moldova	3	1	7	10	8	1	6	2	10	1	12
17	Finland	6	8	10	12	14	10	8	12		11	
18	Poland	17	16	13	8	7	14	11	18		14	
19	Lithuania	23	17	23	23	21	21	19	22		20	
20	Sweden	16	4	16	14	19	17	7	14		18	
21	Cyprus	24	22	22	20	20	22	18	23		16	
22	Italy	20	15	18	19	18	16	23	20		4	7
23	Norway	10	7	9	6	10	9	1	6	5	17	
24	Romania											
25	Austria	22	24	19	17	22	18	21	21		23	

== See also ==
- List of music released by Romanian artists that has charted in major music markets
