= Theodor Andrei =

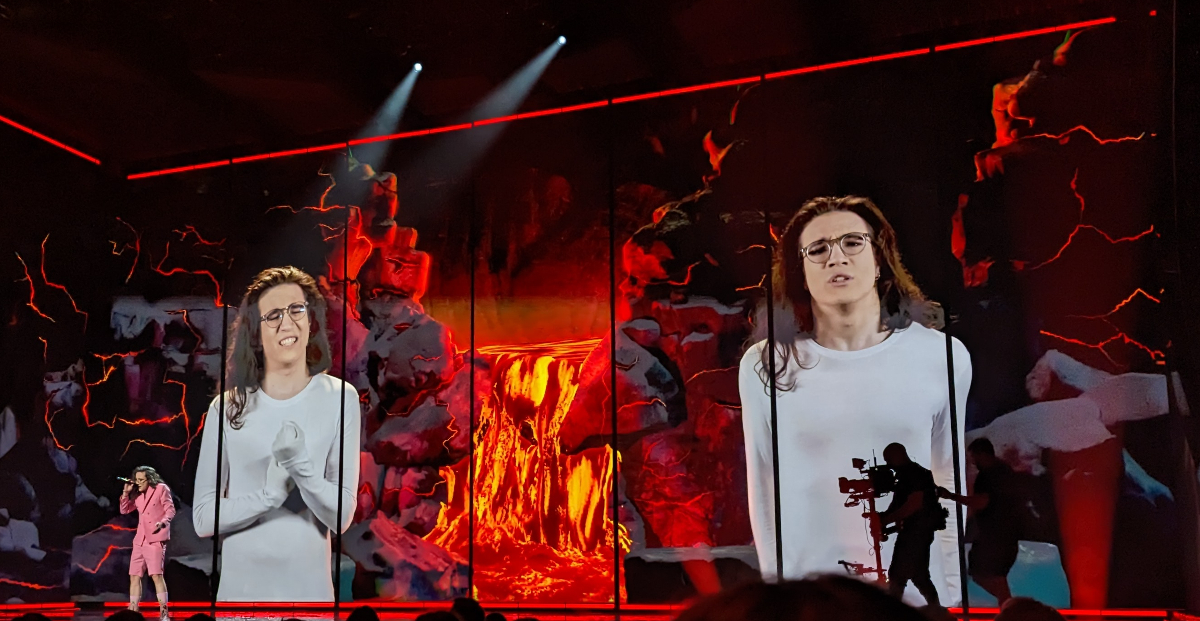
- Theodor Andrei in 2023

Background information
- Born: Theodor-Octavian Andrei; 9 October 2004 (age 21); Bucharest, Romania
- Genres: pop, rock
- Years active: 2015–present
- Label: Electrecord

Theodor-Octavian Andrei (Romanian: [te.oˈdor oktaviˈan anˈdrej]; born 9 October 2004), is a Romanian singer-songwriter, actor and theatre director. He represented Romania at the Eurovision Song Contest 2023 with the song "D.G.T. (Off and On)".

== Early life and education ==
=== Early life and family ===
Theodor Octavian Andrei was born in Bucharest, Romania to Simona Andrei and Gheorghe Andrei, both alumni of the Politehnica University of Bucharest. Throughout his childhood, he cherished the companionship of his beloved cats.

Andrei’s interest in music began early. His parents introduced him to legendary performers such as Elvis Presley, and Michael Jackson, as well as Romanian artists like Ștefan Bănică Jr. and Laura Stoica, whose music he grew up listening to. He began imitating Elvis Presley and Michael Jackson at the age of four. As he got older, Andrei independently explored the Rock ’n’ Roll genre and developed a strong interest in a wide range of international artists, including Little Richard, James Brown, Whitney Houston, Kiss, Aerosmith, Bon Jovi, Gary Moore, or Joe Bonamass. Among Romanian artists, he has cited Gabriel Cotabiță, Jean Gavril, Mihai Traistariu, Dan Bittman, and Connect-R as major influences.

Andrei’s mother was the first to recognize his musical talent. In 2014, during his audition for Next Star, she heard his voice amplified through the show's sound system and began to believe in his potential. At the time, Andrei was 10 years old.

In the years that followed, his mother accompanied him to numerous music festivals, offering consistent support. Along with his father and grandmother, she contributed significantly to his early musical journey.

=== Education ===
Andrei began studying classical piano at age seven. His first piano teacher and vocal coach was Raluca Ciocă. His formal piano education concluded several years later. Andrei continued to develop his piano and guitar skills through self-study and practice, motivated by an early desire to compose his own songs.

During middle school, Andrei was exposed to bullying, a difficult period that he has discussed in interviews. Andrei is outspoken about the anti-bullying movement and stands up against different forms and shapes of bullying in the music video of his song, “Artist”.

Andrei graduated in 2023 from the Acting & Performing Arts class at Dinu Lipatti National College of Arts, Bucharest, Romania. He received the highest grade on his graduation thesis, titled The Post-War and Contemporary Romanian Comedy. In the same year, he began his university studies in Theater Arts at Hyperion University, in Bucharest. Andrei is currently focused on completing his training in acting, theater, and related performance skills under the guidance of theater professor Adriana Trandafir.

== Career ==
=== Music ===
During the summer between fifth and sixth grade, Andrei began attending music festivals and competitions. In middle school, he started working with his mentor and vocal coach, Dan Dimitriu, a well-known Romanian composer, music professor, and music director. Dimitriu is also the conductor of the “Constantin Tanase” Theater Orchestra.

Andrei first gained public attention in 2017, at the age of 13, when he participated in the Romanian version of The Voice Kids, reaching the semi-finals.

Between the ages of 13 and 15, Andrei received multiple jury awards, third-place finishes, and excellence awards at various national and international music festivals. In 2019, he won first place at the Teleorman Pop Fest.

At 16, Andrei participated in the ninth season of The X Factor Romania, reaching the Bootcamp stage.

By 2022, Andrei had won the Great Trophy at the Mihaela Runceanu International Music Festival, the Great Trophy at the Teleorman Pop Fest, The Romanian Musicologists and Composers Association Award at the George Grigoriu International Music Festival, and first place/Best Artist at the Radu Șerban National Music Festival.

Andrei began writing music before the age of 14. Since 2017, he has released several singles, including “Ţigări mentolate” with Valentina and “Prigoria Teen Fest” with Denis Belu (Shtrood).

On October 15, 2022, Andrei released his first studio album, Fragil, under the Electrecord label. The release occurred six days after his 18th birthday. The album sold out four times on popular Romanian marketplaces. The song "D.G.T." from Fragil has a special version that won the 2023 Romanian Eurovision National Selection. Another track from the album, "Artist," was awarded "Best Song of a Singer-Songwriter" at the 2022 Radar de Media Gala Awards.

Eurovision was a childhood dream for Andrei. He recalled watching the contest every year with his family and telling himself that he would one day participate. In 2023, Andrei won the Selecția Națională for Eurovision. He described winning the national selection and the release day of his first album—while he was a 12th-grade student—as “the happiest days of my life.”

At Eurovision, Andrei performed in the second semi-final on 11 May 2023 but failed to qualify for the grand final. It was later revealed that he finished in second-to-last place in the semi-final, tied with San Marino with zero points. Following the contest, Andrei spoke out about difficulties he faced working with the Romanian national broadcaster TVR, including the rejection of his staging ideas for his performance in Liverpool and the imposition of a slower revamp of his song.

He also expressed that his Eurovision dream gradually turned into a nightmare due to his experience with TVR. Despite these challenges, Andrei took matters into his own hands by self-financing and producing the music video for his song “D.G.T.” with the help of friends. He additionally produced the Eurovision Medleys, covering all 37 songs of the competition. Andrei has described his interactions with Eurovision fans as one of the most incredible experiences of his career. His motto during Eurovision 2023 was: “Go after your dreams, don't be afraid to push through the boundaries and insecurities, accept yourselves, love each other freely and make love not war.”

After Eurovision, Andrei held his first UK concert in London on 28 July, as part of Stage 002, an event organized by Platform '96. The performance took place at The Water Rats, a renowned London venue known for hosting early gigs by artists such as Bob Dylan, The Pogues, and Oasis. Platform '96 promoted the event as Andrei’s “redemption arc.” His one-hour set included songs from his debut album Fragil, the Eurovision Medleys, and covers of songs by a wide range of artists, including Frank Sinatra, Eminem, Madcon, Bruno Mars, Måneskin, Olivia Rodrigo, Miley Cyrus, and Creedence Clearwater Revival.

Andrei is currently working on his second studio album, titled Echilibru. As of 2024, three tracks from the album have been released: “Preludiu Echilibru,” “Fantoma,” and “Zendaya.

=== Theatre ===
Andrei began acting at age 13. In 2018, he auditioned for a role in Nepoții lui Tănase (Tănase's Grandchildren), a youth revue-style play by Alin Gheorghișan, performed at the Constantin Tănase Theater in Bucharest. He portrayed the role of the Majordom (The Butler) from 2018 to 2019. This experience sparked a strong interest in acting, leading him to enroll in the Theater Arts and Acting section of the National College of Arts “Dinu Lipatti” in Bucharest. Since then, Andrei has expressed that music and theater complement each other closely and that he would find it difficult to pursue one without the other.

During high school, Andrei began formal acting training at the Victory of Art School of Theatre in Bucharest. Under the guidance of Julieta Georoiu, the head of the institution, he embarked on his theatrical journey. Throughout high school, Andrei took on major roles in numerous classic plays and musicals. Notably, he portrayed Francis Flute/Thisbe in William Shakespeare’s A Midsummer Night’s Dream and Augustus Waters in The Fault in Our Stars, based on the novel by John Green. His debut leading role was as Axel in Dacă noi ne iubim (If We Love Each Other), a rock musical originally created by Julieta Georoiu and recognized as the first Romanian rock musical show based on the music of the renowned pop-rock band Holograf.

In 2022, Andrei won Best Actor in a Leading Role for his portrayal of Eduard in Paravan Două Telefoane (One Screen, Two Phones), a play by Matei Lucaci-Grunberg, at the Grigore Vasiliu Birlic International Youth Theater Festival (FITT „Birlic”).

In 2023, he played the leading role of Wolfgang Amadeus Mozart in Amadeus (play) by Peter Shaffer. The production won the Best Play award at the Constanța International Independent Theater Festival, known as "Seathre Fest".

During the same year, Andrei portrayed Luca in O Floare de Zăpadă (A Snow Flower), a play based on Dumitru Solomon’s original story Zăpezile de Altădată (The Snows of Yesteryear). The production won First Place at the Ștefan Mihăilescu-Brăila National Comedy Competition, where Andrei received the Ștefan Mihăilescu-Brăila Trophy for Best Actor in a Leading Role. Additionally, the play earned Third Place at the Olimpiada Națională de Artă Actorului (National Theatre Olympiad for Students) held in Brăila, Romania.

In 2024 Andrei played Yvan in Artă (Art-play), a play by Yasmina Reza, directed by Clara Ciușcǎ and won the Special Jury Prize for Best Actor in a Leading Role at the Grigore Vasiliu Birlic International Youth Theater Festival (FITT „Birlic”).

Since April 2024, Theodor Andrei has been performing as Mary Sunshine in Chicago („Vodevil muzical”, Chicago-Musical) by John Kander and Fred Ebb, directed by George Costin at the Bucharest Metropolitan Circus.

In March 2025, Andrei began portraying Mercutio in Roméo et Juliette (musical) by Gérard Presgurvic based on William Shakespeare's play, directed by Miklos Gabor Kereny (KERO®) at the Operetta and Musical Theater "Ion Dacian", Bucharest.

On 4 April 2025, Andrei began playing Tom in Invizibilii (The Invisibles), a musical based on the children’s book of the same name by Ioana Pârvulescu, with music by Cornel Ilie (Vunk), staged at Sala Gloria, Bucharest.

=== Directing ===
Andrei began exploring directing in 2022, when he participated in the Youth Theater and Short Film Festival FestTin with the short film Neintenționat: un majorat confuz (Unintentional: A Confused 18th Birthday). He received the Best Directing award for a short film, presented by acclaimed Romanian filmmaker Nae Caranfil.

In 2023, Andrei directed and starred as Luca in the stage play O floare de zăpadă (A Snow Flower), based on Dumitru Solomon’s original story Zăpezile de Altădată (The Snows of Yesteryear). The production won first place at the Ștefan Mihăilescu-Brăila National Comedy Competition and third place at the Olimpiada Națională de Artă Actorului (National Theatre Olympiad for Students) held in Brăila, Romania.

In 2024, Andrei directed Iubirea noastră e Raiul (Our Love Is Heaven), adaptation of Heathers:The Musical by Laurence O'Keefe and Kevin Murphy. The production won a total of ten awards at four Romanian youth theater festivals. At the Grigore Vasiliu Birlic International Youth Theater Festival (FITT „Birlic”), it received the Special Jury Prize, and Best Actress in a Lead Role. At the Ludicus National Youth Theater Festival, it was awarded the Special Jury Prize for an Actress in a Lead Role, Best Actor in a Lead Role, and Best Choreography. In 2025, the same production won the First Price at the "Eusebiu Ștefănescu” National Theater Festival. At the "La Mustață" Independent Theater Festival, the play received the Best Play – Youth Section, the Audience Choice Award and Daily Magazine Special Award. Under Theodor Andrei’s direction, the play’s lead performers won Best Lead Actor and Best Lead Actress.

On 7 June 2025, Andrei premiered a new production: the pop-rock musical A Midsummer Night's Dream, an adaptation of William Shakespeare’s play. The production features original music by Theodor Andrei, music production by Andrei and Denis Belu (shtrood), choreography by Lilian Carauș, and costume design by Alessia Popa-Matei and Theodor Andrei.

=== Film ===
In 2017, Andrei voiced the character Prințul Miercuri (Prince Wednesday) for the Romanian dub of the children's animated series Cartierul Tigruțului Daniel (Daniel Tiger's Neighborhood), released on Netflix. The dubbing was directed by Sabina Mitra and Mircea Drâmbăreanu.

Andrei continued his television work in 2022 with the role of Horia in "Rățușca cea urâtă" ("The Ugly Duckling"), an episode of the TV series Povești de familie (Family Stories), directed by Raluca Sandu.

In 2023, Andrei appeared as Sică in an episode of the TV series Oamenii legii (The Law Enforcement Officers), also directed by Sandu. The TV series follows four Romanian Police teams in action.

In 2024, he took on the role of Instalatorul (The Plumber) in The Pump, an independent short film directed by Iustin Bauer. During the same year, Andrei portrayed Alecu Tânăr in the Lecții de viață (Life Lessons) episode "Prietenul la nevoie" ("The Friend in Need"), under the direction of Radu Lopotaru. The TV series brings up dramatic stories about people facing trials, betrayals, and hidden passions.

By 2025, Andrei played Colindătorul (The Caroler) in the short film Crăciun Fericit (Merry Christmas), a poignant piece by Alexandra Manda exploring themes of aging and isolation. The film's story is a reflection on the absence of loved ones and how easily we can lose them, not just through death, but also through neglect. The film won the Award of Merit in the Women Filmmakers (Student Category) at Mirada Corta, the annual International Short Film Festival held in Mexico City, Mexico.

That same year, 2025, he starred as Andrei in Luați-mă înapoi (Take Me Back), a university-based (UNATC) short film, directed by Luca Bădescu. He also co-wrote with Denis Belu (shtrood) the music for Alexandra, a film by Diana Angelson Busuioc about a tragic story of a contemporary Romanian hero.

== Discography ==
=== Studio albums ===
Title	Information
Fragil.	Released: 15 October 2022; Label: Electrecord, Music Art Academy, Right Records, Selective Studio

=== Extended plays ===
Title	Information
The Eurovision Medleys EP	Released: 17 August 2023; Label: Self-released, WaV Studio

=== Singles ===
Title	Year	Album
"Young And Sweet"	2017	Non-album single
"Și Dacă Azi Zâmbesc"	2018	Non-album single
"Stelele de pe Cer"	2019	Non-album single
"Nu te Mira ca nu te Place"	2019	Non-album single
"Nu le Place"	2020	Non-album single
"Nu Mai Vreau sentimente" (with Oana Velea)	2020	Fragil.
"Beatu' asta fire"	2020	Non-album single
"Crăciunul Ăsta"	2020	Non-album single
"Genul Meu"	2021	Fragil.
"Selectiv"	2021	Fragil.
"Tatuaj"	2021	Fragil.
"Ţigări Mentolate" (with Valentina)	2022	Fragil.
"Prigoria Teen Fest" (with shtrood)	2022	Non-album single
"D.G.T. (Off and On)" (solo or with Luca Udățeanu)	2022	Fragil.
"Artist"	2023	Fragil.
"Arogvnt"	2023	Fragil.
"Preludiu: Echilibru."	2024	TBA
"Fantoma"	2024	TBA
"Zendaya" (with Niță)	2024	TBA

== Music Awards ==
Year	Festival / Contest Name	Location	Category	Award	Work
2017	Silver Yantra International Pop Music Contest	Veliko Tarnovo Bulgaria	Best Stage Presence	Children’s Jury Award	
2017	HermannstadtFest International Festival	Sibiu, Romania	Best Artist	Adrian Ordean Excellence Award	"Singur în noapte" / "Alone in the Night" (written by Leo Iorga and Adrian Ordean)
2018	Florin Bogardo International Festival	Bucharest, Romania	Best Artist	Third Place	"Un Fluture Și-o Pasăre" / "A Butterfly and a Bird" (music by Florin Bogardo, lyrics by Ioana Diaconescu); "Broken Vow" by Lara Fabian
2019	Aurelian Andreescu National Festival	Bucharest, Romania	Best Artist	Third Place	"If I Can Dream" (written by Elvis Presley); "Eternitate" / "Eternity" (music by George Grigoriu, lyrics by Angel Grigoriu)
2019	Teleorman Pop Fest National Festival	Alexandria, Romania	Best Artist	First Place	
2019	Silver Yantra International Pop Music Contest	Veliko Tarnovo Bulgaria	Best Stage Presence	Children’s Jury Award	"Eternitate" / "Eternity" (music by George Grigoriu, lyrics by Angel Grigoriu)
2022	Mihaela Runceanu International Festival	Buzău, Romania	Best Artist	The Great Trophy	"Cu Fiecare Stea" / "With Each Star" (music by Mihai Grigoriu, lyrics by Romeo Iorgulescu); "Gara Noastră Mică" / "Our Little Train Station" (music by Dumitru Lupu, lyrics by Florin Pretorian)
2022	Teleorman Pop Fest National Festival	Alexandria, Romania	Best Artist	The Great Trophy	"Gara Noastră Mică" / "Our Little Train Station" (music by Dumitru Lupu, lyrics by Florin Pretorian); "Boys Do Cry" (written by Marius Bear and Martin Gallop)
2022	George Grigoriu International Festival	Brăila, Romania	Best Artist	The Romanian Musicologists and Composers Association Award	"Ce Mai Vrei?" / "What More Do You Want?" (music by Horia Moculescu, lyrics by Dan V. Dumitriu); "Niciodată, Niciodată" / "Never, Never" (music by George Grigoriu, lyrics by Angel Grigoriu and Romeo Iorgulescu)
2022	Radu Șerban National Festival	Caracal, Romania	Best Artist	First Place	"Cine Oare?" / "Wondering Who?" (music by Viorel Gavrilă, lyrics by Daniel Iordăchioaie); "De Când Mă Știu" (music by Radu Șerban, lyrics by Aurel Storin)
2022	Radar de Media Awards	Bucharest, Romania	Best Songwriter-Singer Award	Myosotis Award	"Artist" (written by Theodor Andrei – music and lyrics)

== Theatre ==
Year	Title	Role	Notes
2018-2019	Nepoții lui Tănase (Tănase’s Grandchildren) by Alin Gheorghișan	Constantin Tănase/ Majordomul (The Butler)	Directed by Alin Gheorghișan; the first youth “revue”‑style theater production in Romania; Constantin Tănase Theater; Bucharest, Romania.
2021	Brainstorm by Ned Glasier and Emily Lim	Tyrel	Directed by Petru Georoiu; Victory of Art School of Theater; Bucharest, Romania.
2021	Dacă noi ne iubim (If We Love Each Other) – original musical by Julieta Georoiu; written by Rareș Fota and Anastasia Jinga	Jack / Axel	First Romanian rock musical based on the music of Romanian band Holograf; directed by Julieta Georoiu; Țăndărică Theater and Metropolis Theater, Bucharest, Romania; Victory of Art School of Theater; premiered 2021; performed 2023, 2024, 2025, 2026. Most recent performance 6 May 2026.
2022	Vivat Academia – by Bogdan Georgescu	Paul	Directed by Andrei Gheorghe; Victory of Art School of Theater; Bucharest, Romania, 2022.
2022	Visul unei nopți de vară – adaptation of A Midsummer Night's Dream by William Shakespeare	Suflete (Flute) / Thisbe	Directed by Petru Georoiu; Metropolis Theater, Bucharest, Romania; Victory of Art School of Theater; premiered 2022; most recent performance 19 May 2024.
2022	Sub Aceeași Stea (The Fault in Our Stars) — play by John Green; stage adaptation by Tiberiu Roșu	Augustus Waters	Directed by Petru Georoiu; Victory of Art School of Theater; Bucharest, Romania, 2022.
2022	Paravan Două Telefoane (One Screen, Two Phones) — play by Matei Lucaci-Grunberg	Eduard	Directed by Petru Georoiu; Victory of Art School of Theater; Bucharest, Romania; premiered 2022; performed 2023, 2024, 2025; most recent performance Dec 2025.
2022	Procesul lui Robin Hood (The Trials of Robin Hood) – by Will Averill	Alan-a-Dale	Directed by Julieta Georoiu; Victory of Art School of Theater; Bucharest, Romania; 2022.
2022	Profesorul de Franceză (The French Teacher) – by Tudor Mușatescu	Anibal	Directed by Ruxandra Ionescu; Victory of Art School of Theater; Bucharest, Romania.
2022	Cei 17 magnifici care au schimbat viitorul (The 17 Magnificent Ones Who Changed the Future)	Prezentatorul (The Presenter)	Directed by Alexandru Nagy; youth art campaign promoting sustainability; project of the Government Department for Sustainable Development and Beneva Association; Romania, performed 27 October 2022- 10 November 2022.
2022	Apolodor — play by Gellu Naum	Apolodor	Directed by Alexandru Ivănoiu; Victory of Art School of Theater; Bucharest, Romania; premiered 2022, performed 2023.
2023	O Floare de Zăpadă (A Snow Flower) — play based on Dumitru Solomon's original story Zăpezile de Altădată (The Snows of Yesteryear)	Luca	Directed and adapted by Theodor Andrei; Victory of Art School of Theater; Bucharest, Romania; premiered 2023.
2023	Amadeus by Peter Shaffer	Wolfgang Amadeus Mozart	Directed by Julieta Georoiu and Radu Solcanu; Țăndărică Theater, Bucharest, Romania; Victory of Art School of Theater; premiered 2023; performed 2024; most recent performances 9 March 2024, 21 September 2024.
2024	Artă (Art) by Yasmina Reza	Yvan	Directed by Clara Ciușcă; Țăndărică Theater, Bucharest, Romania; Victory of Art School of Theater; premiered 10 February 2024; performed 2024.
2024	Mon Cher Dinu – by Monica Ciută (Lipatti 75th Anniversary Concert)	Dinu Lipatti	Directed by Ruxandra Ionescu; Romanian Athenaeum, Bucharest, Romania; Dinu Lipatti National College of Art; performed 4 March 2024.
2024	Liceenii – musical by Alexandra Manda, Adriana Frigioi, and Sebastian Crișu	Răzvan	Directed by Alexandra Manda and Adriana Frigioi; Teatrul Dramaturgilor Români, Bucharest, Romania; April 2024.
2024	Alege să alegi (Make Your Own Choice)	Vlad	Youth Anti-Drug Art Campaign; directed by Alexandru Nagy; "Victor Ion Popa" Theater, Bârlad, other venues northeastern Romania; National Anti-Drug Agency; October 2024.
2024	Iubirea Noastră e Raiul (Our Love Is Heaven) – adaptation of Heathers: The Musical by Laurence O'Keefe and Kevin Murphy	Bill Sweeny / Jason Dean (J.D.)	Directed and translated by Theodor Andrei; Sala Gloria, Metropolis Theater, Bucharest, Romania; Victory of Art School of Theater; premiered 9 June 2024. Theodor Andrei as J.D. 19 December 2024; performed 2025; most recent performance 23 Feb, 2026.
2024	Chicago-Musical/Vodevil muzical (Chicago musical) by John Kander and Fred Ebb	Mary Sunshine	Directed by George Costin; The Metropolitan Circus, Bucharest, Romania; premiered 14 May 2024; performed 2025; most recent performance Sept 2025.
2025	Romeo și Julieta (Romeo and Juliet) – a pop-rock musical by Gérard Presgurvic, based on William Shakespeare's play	Mercutio	Directed by Miklos Gabor Kereny (KERO®), translation by Ernest Fazekas; Teatrul Național de Operetă și Musical "Ion Dacian", Bucharest, Romania; premiered March 2025; performed 2025; most recent performance 21 June 2026.
2025	Invizibilii (The Invisibles) – musical based on the children’s book by Ioana Pârvulescu	Tom	Directed by Claudia Ciobanu; music by Cornel Ilie (Vunk); Sala Gloria, Sala Palatului, Bucharest, Romania; Wonder Theater; opened 4 April 2025; premiered 9 Nov 2025; most recent performance 8 Feb 2026.
2025	Strigătul Libertății (The Cry of Freedom) – first Romanian musical depicting the 1989 Revolution	Vlad	Directed by Alexandru Nagy; script by Theodor Andrei, Alexandru Nagy, Bianca Marinescu, Tomy Weisbuch; musical arrangements by Theodor Andrei, Dani Ionescu; Metropolis Theatre, Bucharest, Romania; Victory of Art School of Theater; premiered 22 December 2025; most recent performance 14 June 2026.
2026	Next to Normal – pop-rock musical by Brian Yorkey (book/lyrics), Tom Kitt (music)	Henry	Directed by Victor Bucur, translation by Geanina Jinaru-Doboș; Teatrul Național de Operetă și Musical "Ion Dacian", Bucharest, Romania; debut 16 April 2026.
2026	Poetic Beats- an interactive poetry musical featuring live vocals, rhythmic poetry, and live audience voting	Master of Ceremonies (MC)	Directed by Alexandru Nagy, project coordination by Julieta Georoiu, and music direction by Theodor Andrei; headlining Radu Ștefan Bănică and Larisa Mihăeș; Metropolis Theatre, Bucharest, Romania; Victory of Art School of Theater; previewed 21 June 2026 with a premiere scheduled for Autumn 2026.

== Theatre Awards ==
Year	Festival	Location	Award	Role/Production
2022	Festivalul Internațional de Teatru pentru Tineret „Grigore Vasiliu Birlic” (FITT „Birlic”) / "Grigore Vasiliu Birlic" International Youth Theater Festival	Fălticeni, Romania	Best Lead Actor	Eduard in Paravan. Două telefoane (One Screen Two Phones) by Matei Lucaci-Grünberg
2023	Concursul Național de Comedie „Ștefan Mihăilescu-Brăila” ("Ștefan Mihăilescu-Brăila" National Comedy Competition), organized by “Hariclea Darclée” Arts High School and “Maria Filotti” Theater	Brăila, Romania	Ștefan Mihăilescu-Brăila Trophy for Best Lead Actor	Luca in O floare de zăpadă (A Snow Flower), a play based on Dumitru Solomon’s original story Zăpezile de altădată (The Snows of Yesteryear); directed by Theodor Andrei.
2023	Concursul Național de Comedie „Ștefan Mihăilescu-Brăila” ("Ștefan Mihăilescu-Brăila" National Comedy Competition), organized by “Hariclea Darclée” Arts High School and “Maria Filotti” Theater	Brăila, Romania	First Place, Play Contest	Luca in O floare de zăpadă (A Snow Flower), a play based on Dumitru Solomon’s original story Zăpezile de altădată (The Snows of Yesteryear); directed by Theodor Andrei.
2023	Olimpiada Națională de Arta Actorului (The National Theatre Olympics)	Brăila, Romania	Third Place, Play Contest	Luca in O floare de zăpadă (A Snow Flower), a play based on Dumitru Solomon’s original story Zăpezile de altădată (The Snows of Yesteryear); directed by Theodor Andrei.
2023	Festivalul Internaţional de Teatru Independent Constanţa (FITIC) / Constanţa International Independent Theater Festival; Seathre Fest	Constanţa, Romania	Best Play	Wolfgang Amadeus Mozart in Amadeus, a play by Peter Shaffer
2024	Festivalul Internațional de Teatru pentru Tineret „Grigore Vasiliu Birlic” (FITT „Birlic”) / "Grigore Vasiliu Birlic" International Youth Theater Festival	Fălticeni, Romania	Special Jury Prize for Best Lead Actor	Yvan in Artă (Art), a play by Yasmina Reza
2024	Festivalul Internațional de Teatru pentru Tineret „Grigore Vasiliu Birlic” (FITT „Birlic”) / "Grigore Vasiliu Birlic" International Youth Theater Festival	Fălticeni, Romania	Special Jury Prize for Play	Iubirea noastră e raiul (Our Love Is Heaven), an adaptation of Heathers: The Musical by Laurence O’Keefe and Kevin Murphy; directed by Theodor Andrei

== Directing ==
Year	Title	Notes
2022	Neintenționat: un majorat confuz (Unintentional: A Confused 18th Birthday)	Short film
2023	O Floare de Zăpadă (A Snow Flower)	Play based on Dumitru Solomon's original story Zăpezile de Altădată (The Snows of Yesteryear)
2024	Iubirea Noastră e Raiul (Our love is Heaven)	Adaptation of Heathers: The Musical by Laurence O'Keefe and Kevin Murphy
2025	Visul unei nopți de vară (A Midsummer Night's Dream)	A pop-rock musical adaptation of William Shakespeare's play; original music by Theodor Andrei; music production by Theodor Andrei and Denis Belu (shtrood); costume design by Alessia Popa-Matei, Theodor Andrei; Sala Mică, The National Palace of Children, Metropolis Theater, Bucharest, Romania; Victory of Art School of Theater; premiered 7 June 2025; performed Sept 2025; most recent performance 16 March 2026
2026	Rapunzel	Theatre production for young audiences with interactive and educational elements; music by Theodor Andrei; Sala Luceafărul, Bucharest, Romania; Qfeel School of Theatre; premiered 19 April 2026
2026	La Multi Ani, Amanta Mea! (Happy Birthday My Mistress!)	Adaptation and translation of Marc Camoletti's play by Theodor Andrei; scenography by Clara Francesca; Sala Gloria, Bucharest, Romania; Bite – Laboratorul de Teatru; premiered 9 May 2026; most recent performance 27 June 2026.
2026	Astă Seară se Improvizează (Tonight We Improvise)	Adaptation of Luigi Pirandello's play; choreography by Edda Romano; Teatrul Infinit, Bucharest, Romania; Victory of Art School of Theater; premiered 22 May 2026, most recent performance 16 June 2026.

== Directing Awards ==
Year	Festivals	Location	Category/Awards	Directing Work
2022	Festivalul de Teatru și Film de Scurt Metraj pentru Tineret – FesTin (Youth Theater and Short Film Festival – FesTin)	Caracal, Romania	Best Directing (short film)	Neintenționat: un majorat confuz (Unintentional: A Confused 18th Birthday) – short film, written by Julia Moraru; award presented by Nae Caranfil.
2023	Concursului Național de Comedie "Ștefan Mihăilescu-Brăila" ("Ștefan Mihăilescu-Brăila" National Comedy Competition), organized by "Hariclea Darclée" Arts High School and "Maria Filotti" Theater	Brăila, Romania	Ștefan Mihăilescu-Brăila Trophy for Best Lead Actor (Theodor Andrei)	O Floare de Zăpadă (A Snow Flower) – play based on Dumitru Solomon's original story Zăpezile de Altădată (The Snows of Yesteryear).
2023	Concursului Național de Comedie "Ștefan Mihăilescu-Brăila" ("Ștefan Mihăilescu-Brăila" National Comedy Competition), organized by "Hariclea Darclée" Arts High School and "Maria Filotti" Theater	Brăila, Romania	First Place, Play Contest	O Floare de Zăpadă (A Snow Flower) – play based on Dumitru Solomon's original story Zăpezile de Altădată (The Snows of Yesteryear).
2023	Olimpiada Națională de Arta Actorului (The National Theatre Olympics)	Brăila, Romania	Third Place, Play Contest	O Floare de Zăpadă (A Snow Flower) – play based on Dumitru Solomon's original story Zăpezile de Altădată (The Snows of Yesteryear).
2024	Festivalul Internațional de Teatru pentru Tineret „Grigore Vasiliu Birlic” (FITT „Birlic”) ("Grigore Vasiliu Birlic" International Youth Theater Festival)	Fălticeni, Romania	Special Jury Prize for Play	Iubirea Noastră e Raiul (Our love is Heaven) – adaptation of Heathers: The Musical by Laurence O'Keefe and Kevin Murphy
2024	Festivalul Internațional de Teatru pentru Tineret „Grigore Vasiliu Birlic” (FITT „Birlic”) ("Grigore Vasiliu Birlic" International Youth Theater Festival)	Fălticeni, Romania	Best Lead Actress (Iarina Preda)	Iubirea Noastră e Raiul (Our love is Heaven) – adaptation of Heathers: The Musical by Laurence O'Keefe and Kevin Murphy
2024	Festivalul Național de Teatru "Ludicus" ("Ludicus" National Youth Theater Festival)	Mioveni, Romania	Special Jury Prize for Best Lead Actress (Mara Droj)	Iubirea Noastră e Raiul (Our love is Heaven) – adaptation of Heathers: The Musical by Laurence O'Keefe and Kevin Murphy
2024	Festivalul Național de Teatru "Ludicus" ("Ludicus" National Youth Theater Festival)	Mioveni, Romania	Best Lead Actor (Matei Saizescu)	Iubirea Noastră e Raiul (Our love is Heaven) – adaptation of Heathers: The Musical by Laurence O'Keefe and Kevin Murphy
2024	Festivalul Național de Teatru "Ludicus" ("Ludicus" National Youth Theater Festival)	Mioveni, Romania	Best Choreography (Diana Colea)	Iubirea Noastră e Raiul (Our love is Heaven) – adaptation of Heathers: The Musical by Laurence O'Keefe and Kevin Murphy
2025	Festivalului Național de Teatru „Eusebiu Ștefănescu" ("Eusebiu Ștefănescu” National Theater Festival)	Câmpina, Romania	First Place, Play Contest	Iubirea Noastră e Raiul (Our love is Heaven) – adaptation of Heathers: The Musical by Laurence O'Keefe and Kevin Murphy
2025	Festivalul de Teatru Independent "La Mustață" ("La Mustață" Independent Theater Festival)	Bucharest, Romania	First Place for Best Play – Youth Section	Iubirea Noastră e Raiul (Our love is Heaven) – adaptation of Heathers: The Musical by Laurence O'Keefe and Kevin Murphy
2025	Festivalul de Teatru Independent "La Mustață" ("La Mustață" Independent Theater Festival)	Bucharest, Romania	Audience Choice Award (Play)	Iubirea Noastră e Raiul (Our love is Heaven) – adaptation of Heathers: The Musical by Laurence O'Keefe and Kevin Murphy
2025	Festivalul de Teatru Independent "La Mustață" ("La Mustață" Independent Theater Festival)	Bucharest, Romania	Daily Magazine Special Award	Iubirea Noastră e Raiul (Our love is Heaven) – adaptation of Heathers: The Musical by Laurence O'Keefe and Kevin Murphy
2025	Festivalul de Teatru Independent "La Mustață" ("La Mustață" Independent Theater Festival)	Bucharest, Romania	Best Lead Actress (Iarina Preda)	Iubirea Noastră e Raiul (Our love is Heaven) – adaptation of Heathers: The Musical by Laurence O'Keefe and Kevin Murphy
2025	Festivalul de Teatru Independent "La Mustață" ("La Mustață" Independent Theater Festival)	Bucharest, Romania	Best Lead Actor (Raul Rizoiu)	Iubirea Noastră e Raiul (Our love is Heaven) – adaptation of Heathers: The Musical by Laurence O'Keefe and Kevin Murphy
2026	Festivalul International de Teatru "The Muses" (International Youth Festival of Arts "The Muses")	Sozopol, Bulgaria	Festival Trophy	Iubirea Noastră e Raiul (Our love is Heaven) – adaptation of Heathers: The Musical by Laurence O'Keefe and Kevin Murphy
2026	Festivalul International de Teatru "The Muses" (International Youth Festival of Arts "The Muses")	Sozopol, Bulgaria	First Place for Best Play/Performance	Iubirea Noastră e Raiul (Our love is Heaven) – adaptation of Heathers: The Musical by Laurence O'Keefe and Kevin Murphy
2026	Festivalul International de Teatru "The Muses" (International Youth Festival of Arts "The Muses")	Sozopol, Bulgaria	Best Lead Actress (Iarina Preda)	Iubirea Noastră e Raiul (Our love is Heaven) – adaptation of Heathers: The Musical by Laurence O'Keefe and Kevin Murphy
2026	Festivalului Național de Teatru „Eusebiu Ștefănescu" ("Eusebiu Ștefănescu” National Theater Festival)	Câmpina, Romania	First Place, Play Contest	La Multi Ani, Amanta Mea! (Happy Birthday My Mistress!), adaptation of Marc Camoletti's play
2026	Festivalului Național de Teatru „Eusebiu Ștefănescu" ("Eusebiu Ștefănescu” National Theater Festival)	Câmpina, Romania	Best Lead Actress (Ioana Antal)	La Multi Ani, Amanta Mea! (Happy Birthday My Mistress!), adaptation of Marc Camoletti's play
2026	Festivalul de Teatru Independent "La Mustață" ("La Mustață" Independent Theater Festival)	Bucharest, Romania	Best Lead Actress (Ioana Antal)	La Multi Ani, Amanta Mea! (Happy Birthday My Mistress!), adaptation of Marc Camoletti's play

Awards and achievements
Preceded by WRS with "Llámame"	Romania in the Eurovision Song Contest; 2023	Succeeded by Alexandra Căpitănescu with "Choke Me"
