= Alexandra Căpitănescu =

Romanian singer-songwriter (born 2003)

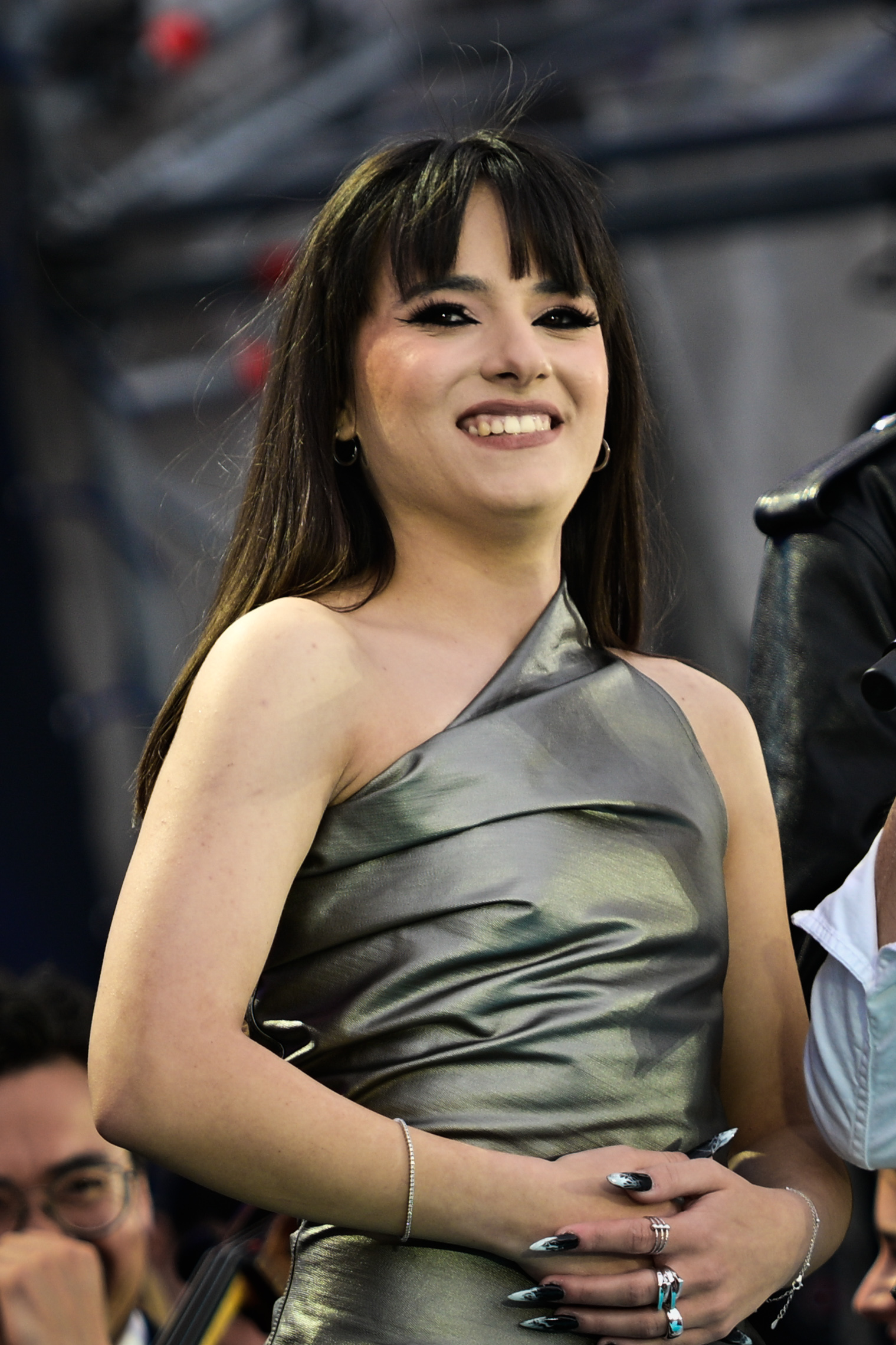
- Căpitănescu in 2026

Background information
- Born: 31 July 2003 (age 23); Galați, Romania
- Genres: Pop rock; nu metal; alternative rock
- Occupations: Singer; songwriter
- Instrument: Vocals • piano
- Years active: 2023 - present

Alexandra Căpitănescu (Romanian pronunciation: [alekˈsandra kəpitəˈnesku]; born 31 July 2003) is a Romanian singer and songwriter who rose to prominence by winning season 11 of Vocea României (The Voice of Romania). She represented Romania in the Eurovision Song Contest 2026 with the song "Choke Me" and finished in third place, her country's best result.

== Early life ==
Căpitănescu was born and raised in Galați in eastern Romania. She has been singing and learning to play the piano since the age of 10.

She was a student at the Costache Negri High School, and she has completed an undergraduate degree in Medical Physics in Bucharest and as of April 2026 is studying a Masters in Medical Physics.

== Career ==
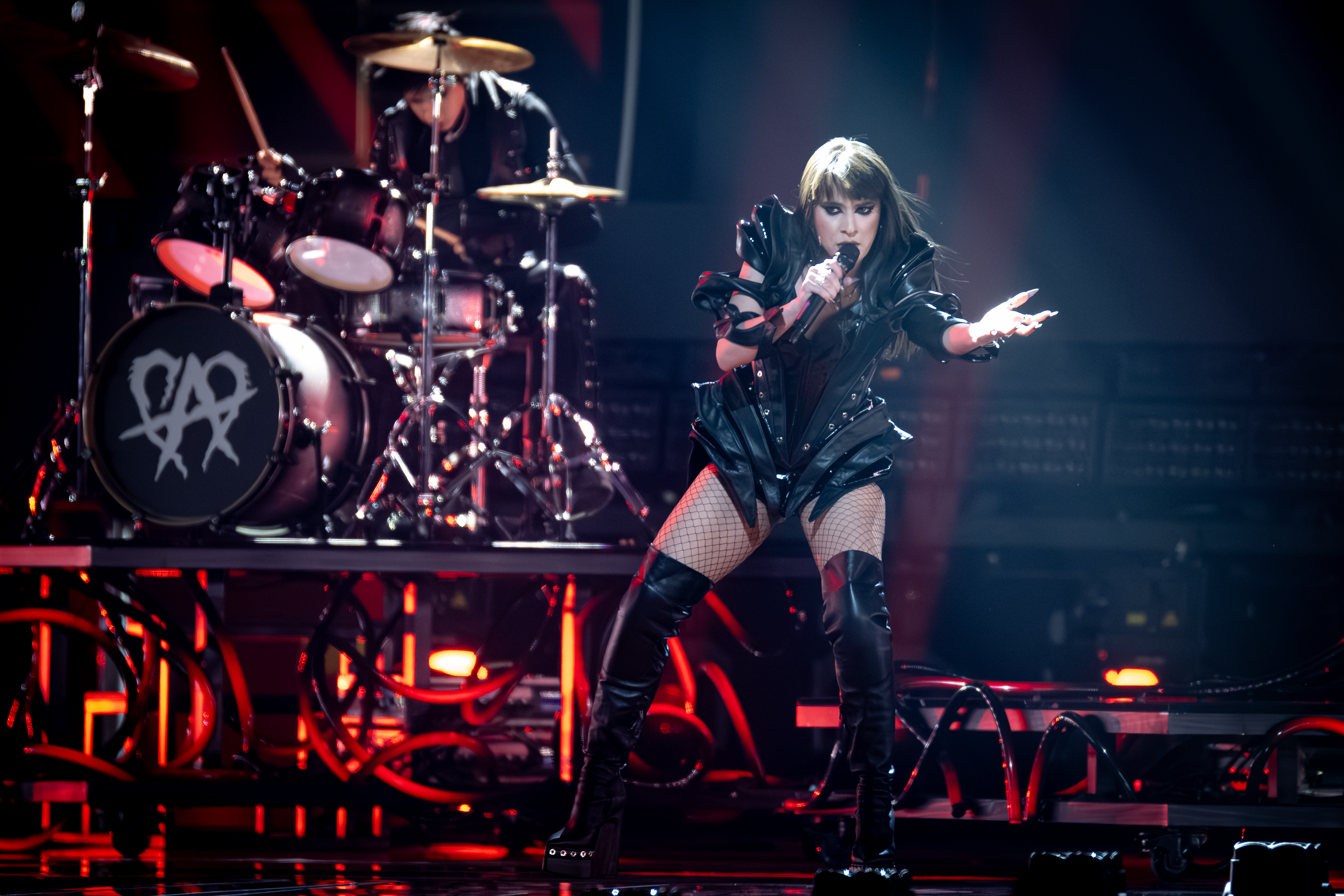
Căpitănescu placed third in the Eurovision Song Contest 2026 with the song "Choke Me."

At age 15 she went on Românii au talent (Romanians Got Talent) and was encouraged by the presenter Smiley to try for Vocea României (The Voice of Romania). By the age of 17 she had participated in other "...music competitions and festivals, both in the country [Romania] and abroad (Republic of Moldova and Russia), as well as in competition shows such as Dream Star, Next Star... and X Factor." At age 19 Căpitănescu competed in season 11 of Vocea României and was declared the winner of that season. In 2024, Căpitănescu released her debut EP “Căpitanu'”, and since January 2026 she has been a temporary member of the Romanian folk metal band E-an-na, replacing Roxana Amarandi.

On 6 February 2026, Televiziunea Română (TVR) announced that Căpitănescu was selected as one of the semi-finalists of Selecția națională 2026, the national final format developed by TVR in order to select its entry for the Eurovision Song Contest 2026. After advancing to the final, she won the competition on 4 March 2026. On 14 May 2026, Căpitănescu performed in the second semi-final and qualified to the final, and two days later, on 16 May 2026, Căpitănescu placed third in the Eurovision final, equalling the best ever ranking for Romania in the Eurovision Song Contest.

== Discography ==
Credits taken from Apple Music.

=== Studio albums ===
| Title | Details |
|---|---|
| Choke Me | Released: 16 October 2026; Label: Universal Music Romania; Format: Digital download, streaming |

=== Extended plays ===
| Title | Details |
|---|---|
| Căpitanu' | Released: 5 April 2024; Label: Universal Music Romania; Format: Digital download, streaming |
| Dilaila (Live) | Released: 31 July 2026; Label: Universal Music Romania; Format: Digital download, streaming |

=== Singles ===
==== As lead artist ====
| Title | Year | Peak chart positions | | | | | | | | | | Album or EP |
| Title | Year | ROU | ROU Air. | AUT | FIN | GRE Int. | LTU | SWE | SWI | UK Sales | UK Rock Metal | Album or EP |
|---|---|---|---|---|---|---|---|---|---|---|---|---|
| "Nu pot" | 2023 | — | — | — | — | — | — | — | — | — | — | Non-album single |
| "Căpitanu'" | 2024 | — | — | — | — | — | — | — | — | — | — | Căpitanu' |
| "A ta" | 2024 | — | — | — | — | — | — | — | — | — | — | Non-album singles |
| "Arde" | 2024 | — | — | — | — | — | — | — | — | — | — | Non-album singles |
| "Tare" (with Majii) | 2025 | — | — | — | — | — | — | — | — | — | — | Non-album singles |
| "Dilaila" | 2025 | — | — | — | — | — | — | — | — | — | — | Non-album singles |
| "Stea căzătoare" | 2025 | — | — | — | — | — | — | — | — | — | — | Non-album singles |
| "De sărbători" | 2025 | — | — | — | — | — | — | — | — | — | — | Non-album singles |
| "Choke Me" | 2026 | 3 | 42 | 13 | 14 | 4 | 7 | 48 | 89 | 27 | 14 | Choke Me |
| "Heat" | 2026 | — | — | — | — | — | — | — | — | — | — | Choke Me |
| "CMYM" | 2026 | — | — | — | — | — | — | — | — | — | — | Choke Me |
"—" denotes a recording that did not chart or was not released in that territory.

==== As featured artist ====
| Title | Year | Album or EP |
|---|---|---|
| "Nu mai pot" (E-an-na featuring Alexandra Căpitănescu) | 2026 | Non-album single |

== See also ==
- List of music released by Romanian artists that has charted in major music markets

Awards and achievements
| Preceded by Theodor Andrei with "D.G.T. (Off and On)" | Romania in the Eurovision Song Contest; 2026 | Succeeded by TBA |
