= Romania in the Eurovision Song Contest 2023 =

- Eurovision Song Contest 2023
- Participating broadcaster: Televiziunea Română (TVR)
- Country: Romania
- Selection process: Selecția Națională 2023
- Selection date: 11 February 2023

Competing entry
- Song: "D.G.T. (Off and On)"
- Artist: Theodor Andrei
- Songwriters: Theodor Andrei; Mikail Jahed; Luca de Mezzo; Luca Udățeanu

Placement
- Semi-final result: Failed to qualify (15th)

Participation chronology

Romania was represented at the Eurovision Song Contest 2023 with the song "D.G.T. (Off and On)", written by Theodor Andrei, Mikail Jahed, Luca de Mezzo, and Luca Udățeanu, and performed by Andrei himself. The Romanian participating broadcaster, Televiziunea Română (TVR), organised the national final Selecția Națională 2023 in order to select its entry for the contest. Twelve entries were selected to compete in the national final on 11 February 2023 where "D.G.T. (Off and On)" performed by Theodor Andrei was selected as the winner entirely by a public vote.

Romania was drawn to compete in the second semi-final of the Eurovision Song Contest which took place on 11 May 2023. Performing during the show in position 3, "D.G.T. (Off and On)" was not announced among the top 10 entries of the second semi-final and therefore did not qualify to compete in the final. It was later revealed that Romania placed 15th out of the 16 participating countries in the semi-final and failed to score any points. This marked the worst Romanian result in the contest, and the first time the nation received nul points since its debut in 1994.

== Background ==
Prior to the 2023 contest, Televiziunea Română (TVR) had participated in the Eurovision Song Contest representing Romania 22 times since its first entry in 1994. To this point, its highest placing in the contest has been third place, achieved on two occasions: in 2005 with the song "Let Me Try" performed by Luminița Anghel and Sistem, and in 2010 with the song "Playing with Fire" performed by Paula Seling and Ovi. To this point, Romania has qualified to the final 14 out of 17 times since the introduction of semi-finals to the format of the contest in 2004. In 2022, "Llámame" by WRS qualified to the final and placed 18th.

As part of its duties as participating broadcaster, TVR organises the selection of its entry in the Eurovision Song Contest and broadcasts the event in the country. The broadcaster has consistently selected its entry through national finals that feature a competition among several artists and songs, except in 2021 when it internally selected the entry. Despite threatening a possible withdrawal in response to the nation's suspended jury votes in the 2022 contest, the broadcaster confirmed its intentions to participate at the 2023 contest on 26 August 2022 after dropping all objections towards the European Broadcasting Union (EBU). TVR opted again to select its 2023 entry through a national final.

== Before Eurovision ==
=== Selecția Națională 2023 ===
Selecția Națională 2023 was the national final organised by TVR in order to select its entry for the Eurovision Song Contest 2023. The competition took place at the TVR studios in Bucharest and was hosted by Laurențiu Niculescu and Ilinca, who represented Romania in 2017. The producer of the competition was Mihai Predescu, who was also appointed as the head of the Romanian delegation at the Eurovision Song Contest. The show was televised on TVR1, TVRi as well as online via the broadcaster's streaming service TVR+ and YouTube.

==== Competing entries ====
TVR opened a submission period for artists and composers to submit their entries between 14 November 2022 and 11 December 2022. Composers were able to submit songs with or without a performer and should this be the case, the performers would be chosen by TVR in consultation with their composers. The broadcaster received 85 submissions after the submission deadline passed. An expert committee consisting of Sebastian Ferenț (Untold and Neversea), Laura Coroianu (Emagic), Bogdan Strătulă (Urban Sunsets Radio), John Varbiu (Summer Well), Alin Vaida (Jazz in the Park), Mihai Predescu (Head of the Romanian delegation at the Eurovision Song Contest) and Remus Achim (project director) reviewed the received submissions between 14 and 16 December 2022. Each juror on the committee rated each song between 1 (lowest) and 10 (highest) based on criteria such as the melodic harmony, structure and lyrics of the song, the orchestral arrangement, originality and stylistic diversity of the composition, sound and voice quality as well as the overall interpretative, visual and artistic quality. After the combination of the jury votes, the top twelve entries that scored the highest were selected for the national final. The competing entries were announced on 17 December 2022. Among the selected competing artists was Andrada Popa, who represented Romania in Junior Eurovision 2008 alongside Mădălina Lefter. Live performances of the competing entries were filmed at the TVR Studio 3 in Bucharest and released online via YouTube on 1 February 2023.

Artist	Song	Songwriter(s)
Adriana Moraru	"Faralaes"	Oana Adriana Moraru
Aledaida	"Bla Bla Bla"	Liam Erixon, Emilija Jokubaitytė, Ellis Sportel, Andrei Mihai
Amia	"Puppet"	Erin Dăneț, Cătălina Ioana Oțeleanu, Alexia Maria Troacă
Andrada Popa	"No Time for Me"	Andrada Popa, Ciprian Lemnaru
Andreea D Folclor Orchestra	"Perinița mea"	Silviu Păduraru, Andreea Păduraru
Andrei Duțu	"Statues"	Kjetil Mørland, Aidan O'Connor
Deiona	"Call on Me"	Erin Dăneț, Cătălina Ioana Oțeleanu, Andreea Ioana Stoica
JaxMan	"Bad & Cool"	Erin Dăneț, Cătălina Ioana Oțeleanu
Maryliss	"Hai vino"	Maria Avramescu
Ocean Drive	"Take You Home"	Alin Mihai Dunca, Andrei Glad Condor, Cătălin Peter, Czol Laszlo, David Andrei Dragoș
Steven Roho, Gabriella and Formația Albatros	"Lele"	Alex Roșu, Formația Albatros, Gabriela Lazăr
Theodor Andrei	"D.G.T. (Off and On)"	Theodor Andrei, Mikail Jahed, Luca De Mezzo, Luca Udățeanu

==== Final ====
The final took place on 11 February 2023. Twelve songs competed and the winner, "D.G.T. (Off and On)" performed by Theodor Andrei, was selected exclusively by public voting through televote and online voting. In addition to the performances of the competing entries, the interval acts featured performances by the show host Ilinca with her band Gadjo Dilo, Wrs (who represented Romania in 2022), Ana Maria Mărgean, and Darius Mabda.

Final – 11 February 2023
R/O	Artist	Song	Public vote			Place
R/O	Artist	Song	Televote	Online vote	Total	Place
1	Deiona	"Call on Me"	925	953	1,878	9
2	Andrada Popa	"No Time for Me"	704	902	1,606	10
3	Ocean Drive	"Take You Home"	867	602	1,469	11
4	Amia	"Puppet"	2,346	1,886	4,232	5
5	Andrei Duțu	"Statues"	2,269	2,033	4,302	3
6	Theodor Andrei	"D.G.T. (Off and On)"	2,556	2,674	5,230	1
7	Steven Roho, Gabriella and Formația Albatros	"Lele"	1,626	1,231	2,857	6
8	Aledaida	"Bla Bla Bla"	2,118	2,132	4,250	4
9	Adriana Moraru	"Faralaes"	510	415	925	12
10	Maryliss	"Hai vino"	1,497	974	2,471	7
11	JaxMan	"Bad & Cool"	1,271	1,188	2,459	8
12	Andreea D Folclor Orchestra	"Perinița mea"	2,896	1,946	4,845	2

==== Ratings ====
Viewing figures by show
Show	Date	Viewing figures		Ref.
Show	Date	Nominal	Share	Ref.
Final	11 February 2023	137,000	1.9%	

==== Reception ====
The 2023 edition of Selecția Națională was met with negative reception from viewers and Romanian artists alike. According to newsin.ro, "several journalists drew attention to the bad organization of the national final, the embarrassing performance of the presenters, with countless stutters and inaccurate information". Artists such as Mihai Trăistariu (who represented Romania in 2006), Florin Ristei and Corina Chiriac criticised the hosting of the selection, with Ristei stating that he was "curious when TVR would realize that what is happening is pathetic and that this contest has zero credibility in our country because of them" and Trăistariu revealing that the audience at the TVR studios had been left befuddled during the voting window as no voting numbers were shown in the venue, leading many audience members not to cast a vote.

=== Promotion ===
Theodor Andrei made several appearances across Europe to specifically promote "D.G.T. (Off and On)" as the Romanian Eurovision entry. On 4 March, Theodor Andrei performed "D.G.T. (Off and On)" during the Moldovan national final. On 15 April, Andrei performed during the Eurovision in Concert event which was held at the AFAS Live venue in Amsterdam, Netherlands and hosted by Cornald Maas and Hila Noorzai. On 16 April, Andrei performed the London Eurovision Party, which was held at the Here at Outernet venue in London, United Kingdom and hosted by Nicki French and Paddy O'Connell.

== At Eurovision ==
According to Eurovision rules, all nations with the exceptions of the host country and the "Big Five" (France, Germany, Italy, Spain and the United Kingdom) are required to qualify from one of two semi-finals in order to compete for the final; the top ten countries from each semi-final progress to the final. The European Broadcasting Union (EBU) split up the competing countries into six different pots based on voting patterns from previous contests, with countries with favourable voting histories put into the same pot. On 31 January 2023, an allocation draw was held, which placed each country into one of the two semi-finals, and determined which half of the show they would perform in. Romania has been placed into the second semi-final, to be held on 11 May 2023, and has been scheduled to perform in the first half of the show.

Once all the competing songs for the 2023 contest had been released, the running order for the semi-finals was decided by the shows' producers rather than through another draw, so that similar songs were not placed next to each other. Romania was set to perform in position 3, following the entry from Armenia and before the entry from Estonia.

All three shows were broadcast in Romania on TVR1 and TVRi with commentary by Bogdan Stănescu and Kyrie Mendel. TVR appointed Eda Marcus as its spokesperson to announce the top 12-point score awarded by the Romanian jury during the final.

=== Semi-final ===
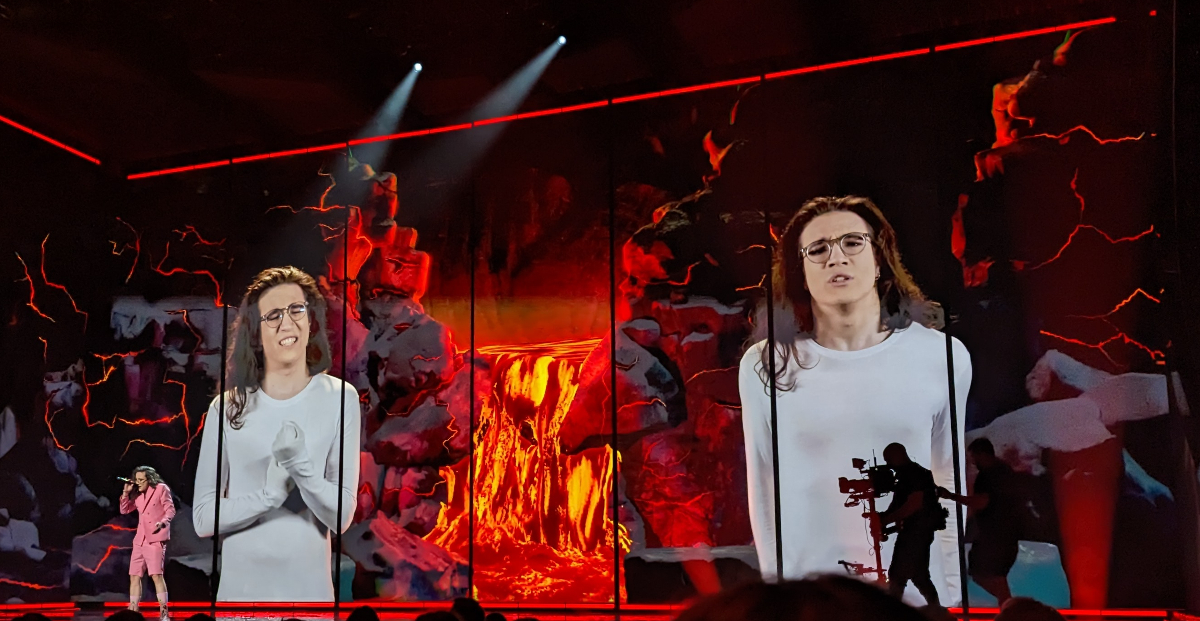
Theodor Andrei during a rehearsal before the second semi-final

Theodor Andrei took part in technical rehearsals on 1 and 4 May, followed by dress rehearsals on 10 and 11 May. This included the jury show on 10 May where the professional back-up juries of each country watched and voted in a result used if any issues with public televoting occurred.

The Romanian performance featured Theodor Andrei dressed in a pale pink suit jacket and shorts with pink SpongeBob socks. The performance began with Andrei playing the acoustic guitar on a stool with the LED screens displaying Andrei's face throughout the song. Towards the end, Andrei was joined on stage by his then-girlfriend and dancer Diana Colea. At the end of the show, Romania was not announced among the top 10 entries in the second semi-final and therefore failed to qualify to compete in the final. It was later revealed Romania placed fifteenth in the semi-final, failing to score any points. The nation initially tied with San Marino as both countries finished with zero points, however, due to a tiebreaker rule that favours the song performed earliest in the running order, Romania placed fifteenth, while San Marino, which performed in position 12 during the semi-final, placed sixteenth. This was the first time Romania received nul points since they debuted in the contest in 1994.

=== Voting ===
Voting during the three shows involved each country awarding sets of points from 1-8, 10 and 12: one from their professional jury and the other from televoting in the final vote, while the semi-final vote was based entirely on the vote of the public. Each nation's jury consisted of five music industry professionals who are citizens of the country they represent. This jury judged each entry based on: vocal capacity; the stage performance; the song's composition and originality; and the overall impression by the act. In addition, each member of a national jury may only take part in the panel once every three years, and no jury was permitted to discuss of their vote with other members or be related in any way to any of the competing acts in such a way that they cannot vote impartially and independently. The individual rankings of each jury member in an anonymised form as well as the nation's televoting results were released shortly after the grand final.

Below is a breakdown of points awarded to Romania and awarded by Romania in the second semi-final and grand final of the contest, and the breakdown of the jury voting and televoting conducted during the two shows:

==== Points awarded to Romania ====
In the semi-final, Romania did not receive any points in the televote. The best place was 12th in the Austrian televote.

==== Points awarded by Romania ====
Points awarded by Romania (Semi-final)
Score	Televote
12 points	Slovenia
10 points	Australia
8 points	Albania
7 points	Austria
6 points	Armenia
5 points	Estonia
4 points	Cyprus
3 points	Poland
2 points	Georgia
1 point	Lithuania

Points awarded by Romania (Final)
Score	Televote	Jury
12 points	Moldova	Italy
10 points	Finland	Sweden
8 points	Sweden	Estonia
7 points	Italy	Moldova
6 points	Israel	Cyprus
5 points	Norway	Albania
4 points	Ukraine	Israel
3 points	France	Australia
2 points	Slovenia	Belgium
1 point	Cyprus	Poland

==== Detailed voting results ====
The following members comprised the Romanian jury:

- Bogdan Strătulă
- Răzvan Petre
- Alexandra Cepraga
- Cristina Nicoleta Săvulescu
- Elena Monica Anghel

Detailed voting results from Romania (Semi-final 2)
R/O	Country	Televote	
R/O	Country	Rank	Points
01	Denmark	15	
02	Armenia	5	6
03	Romania		
04	Estonia	6	5
05	Belgium	12	
06	Cyprus	7	4
07	Iceland	11	
08	Greece	13	
09	Poland	8	3
10	Slovenia	1	12
11	Georgia	9	2
12	San Marino	14	
13	Austria	4	7
14	Albania	3	8
15	Lithuania	10	1
16	Australia	2	10

Detailed voting results from Romania (Final)
R/O	Country	Jury							Televote	
R/O	Country	Juror 1	Juror 2	Juror 3	Juror 4	Juror 5	Rank	Points	Rank	Points
01	Austria	26	21	21	24	13	23		21	
02	Portugal	19	24	8	9	10	16		22	
03	Switzerland	25	7	16	7	14	14		19	
04	Poland	13	8	19	8	6	10	1	16	
05	Serbia	22	23	25	23	21	25		17	
06	France	11	12	20	17	11	21		8	3
07	Cyprus	7	17	9	3	5	5	6	10	1
08	Spain	18	18	18	6	20	20		13	
09	Sweden	3	13	2	5	1	2	10	3	8
10	Albania	6	11	6	4	9	6	5	20	
11	Italy	4	1	1	1	4	1	12	4	7
12	Estonia	9	2	4	2	15	3	8	23	
13	Finland	21	20	24	25	2	13		2	10
14	Czech Republic	14	16	15	19	22	22		15	
15	Australia	1	22	14	15	23	8	3	18	
16	Belgium	2	15	12	14	17	9	2	25	
17	Armenia	16	9	7	11	24	15		12	
18	Moldova	8	4	5	12	3	4	7	1	12
19	Ukraine	15	5	17	20	16	17		7	4
20	Norway	20	10	13	10	12	18		6	5
21	Germany	5	25	26	16	19	19		11	
22	Lithuania	12	3	10	18	25	11		26	
23	Israel	17	14	3	13	7	7	4	5	6
24	Slovenia	23	19	22	21	18	24		9	2
25	Croatia	24	26	23	26	26	26		14	
26	United Kingdom	10	6	11	22	8	12		24	

== After Eurovision ==
After Eurovision, Theodor himself spoke about the mistreatment that he faced working with TVR, such as rejecting all the ideas he had for staging for his performance in Liverpool and imposing a slower revamp to his song, which he did not feel comfortable performing.

After failing to qualify for the final in four out of its latest five participations, Romania was provisionally announced as not participating in the 2024 contest, which was subsequently confirmed on 25 January 2024.
