= Eusebiu Ștefănescu =

Romanian actor

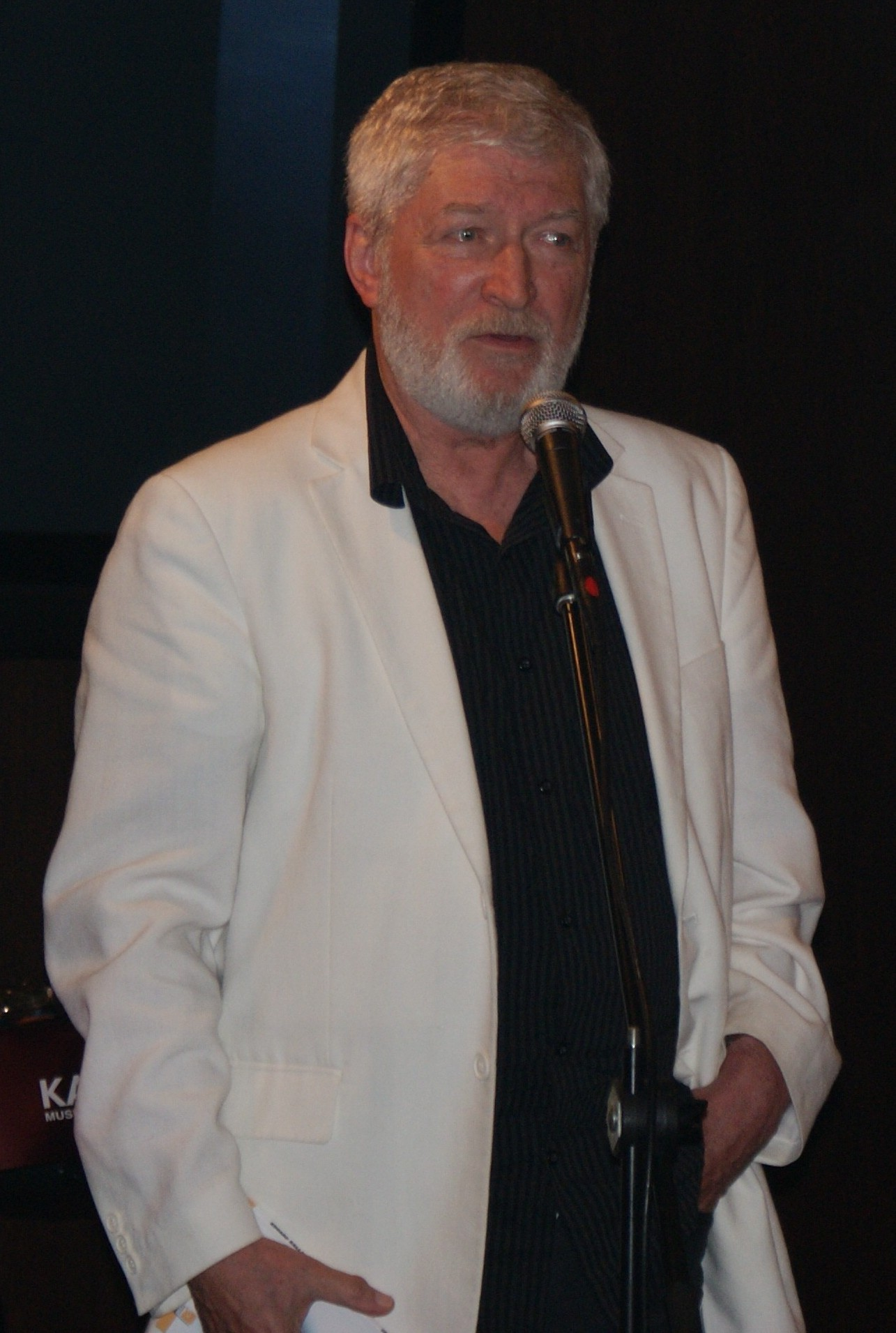
- Born: 3 May 1944; Câmpina, Prahova County, Kingdom of Romania
- Died: 15 March 2015 (aged 70); Bucharest, Romania
- Education: Caragiale Academy of Theatrical Arts and Cinematography
- Occupation: Actor

Eusebiu Ștefănescu (Romanian pronunciation: [e.uˈsebju ʃtefəˈnesku]; 3 May 1944 in Câmpina – 15 March 2015 in Bucharest) was a Romanian actor.

After attending for one year the University of Bucharest, he switched to the Institute of Theatre and Film I.L. Caragiale, graduating in 1967.

He died of brain cancer at age 70.
