= Emy Alupei =

Romanian singer (born 1999)

- Born: 22 February 1999 (age 27)
- Origin: Bucharest, Romania
- Genres: Hip hop; trap music
- Occupation: Singer
- Years active: 2016–present
- Label: Cat Music

Emilia Andreea Alupei (born 22 February 1999), better known by her stage name Emy Alupei, is a Romanian hip-hop and trap singer.

== Career ==
She made her first television appearance in 2016 on X Factor România, where she was eventually eliminated. On July 3, 2018, she independently released her debut single, "#Hate". Later that year, she signed a music contract with Cat Music and on November 1, 2018, released the single "Hannah Montana".

On February 22, 2019, the single "Nu Uita" was released. The song achieved success, and its music video currently has 12 million views. In the same year, she also released the singles "Moldoveanca Haladită", "Lasă Să Mă Doară", and "Fata Lu' Tony Montana". On February 25, 2020, the single "Obor" was released.
