= Jazz in the Park =

Annual music festival in Romania

Jazz in the Park is a music festival in Romania, held annually in Cluj-Napoca. The festival covers an extensive scope of performances from contemporary jazz, funk, and blues to world music, alternative rock, acoustic projects, afrobeat, trip-hop, classical music, or a cappella.

In 2019, at the seventh edition, the festival received the Best Small Festival award at the European Festival Awards, after two nominations in 2014 and 2015. Over time, the festival had confirmed names such as Marcus Miller, Richard Bona, Bill Laurance, Dhafer Youssef, Robert Glasper, Judith Hill, Ghost-Note, Hindi Zahra, Nik Bärtsch, Delvon Lamarr Organ Trio, Nouvelle Vague or Vintage Trouble.

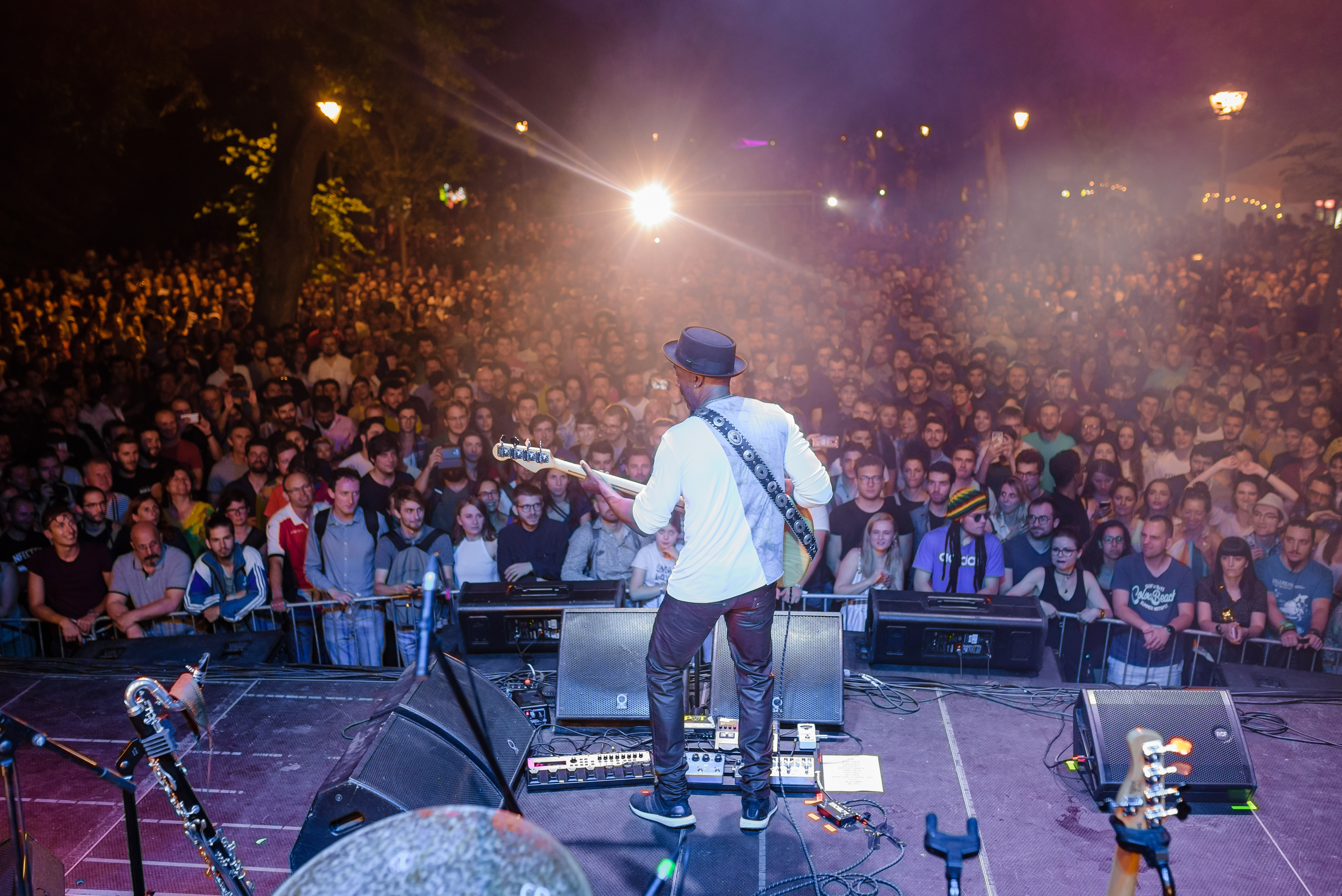
Marcus Miller on stage for Jazz in the Park 2019

== History ==
Jazz in the Park Festival opened on the 21st of June 2013 in the city's Central Park. The initiative appeared at a time when the event market in Cluj-Napoca was still underdeveloped, and usual activities in the park (such as having a picnic, going for a walk with your dog, or even stepping on grass) were forbidden.

With every edition, the festival has changed and developed, having a rich artistic program, a competition program, great headliners, and several other community-centered side projects. For the first seven years, admission to the festival was free. In 2019 the festival brought together in Central Park around 1000.000 people during its 4 days.

The restrictions imposed by the pandemic determined the organizers to move the festival to a space where access could be controlled. As a result, since 2020 the festival takes place in the Ethnographic Park of Cluj-Napoca, the oldest open-air museum in Romania, and access is by ticket.

=== 2013 ===
The first edition of Jazz in the Park took place from June 21 to 23. More than 20.000 people participated in the festival.

Lineup: Waldeck, Otros Aires, Maria Răducanu, Byron, Vița de Vie, Jazzybirds, Cuantune, Alex Mușat & White Blues, Anne, Bogdan Vaida, Răzvan Suma, Big Dimm A’Band, Cobzality, Gabriela Costa, Alex Man.

=== 2014 ===
The second edition of Jazz in the Park took place from July 4 to 6. It had an audience of 23.000 people.

Lineup: Melanie Pain, Teodora Enache & Lars Danielsson, Moonlight Breakfast, Luz Azul, Les Elephants Bizarres, JazzyBit, Jazzybirds, Mara & Kult Studio Artists, Loungerie II, Youvenis.

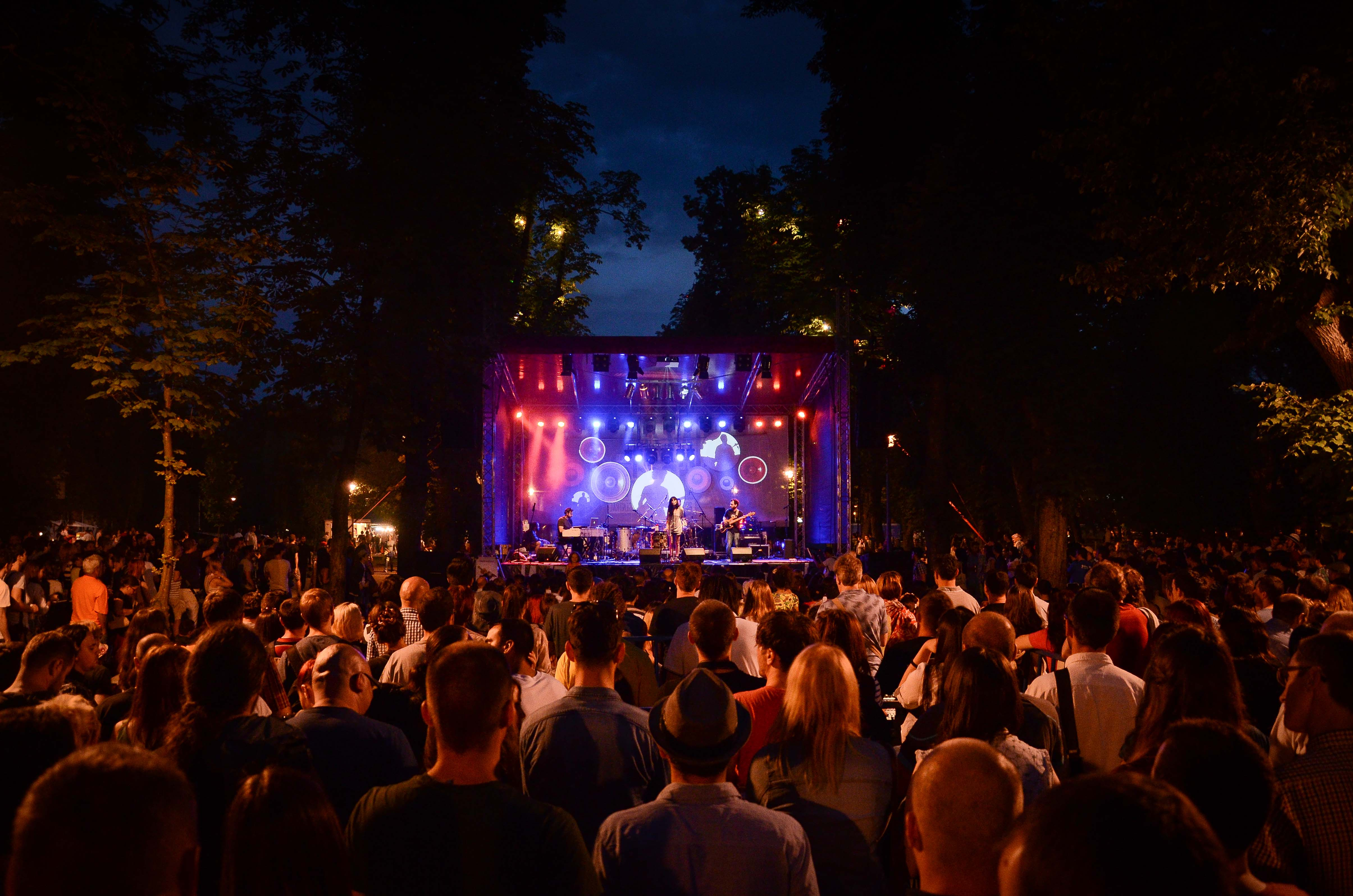
Moonlight Breakfast for Jazz in the Park 2014

=== 2015 ===
The third edition of Jazz in the Park took place from June 29 to July 5. Almost 55.000 people participated in the festival.

Lineup: Blazzaj, Exit Oz, Eyot, Hilde Louise Asbjørnsen, Tango with Lions, Sebastian Spanache Trio, TiPtiL, Mice on the Run, Jazú, Koszika & the HotShots, Les Nuages, The Rank & Fashion, Florin Niculescu, Lucia, N.O.H.A., Zoe Rahman Trio, Jazzybirds, Balako, Barabás Lörinc, Péter Sárosi & Nóra Tasi, Inocsenyka, Bogdan Vaida, Soul Serenade.

=== 2016 ===
The fourth edition of Jazz in the Park took place from June 27 to July 3. It had an audience of 51.000 people.

Lineup: Hindi Zahra, Kovacs, Aaron, Teodora Enache & Beny Rietvelo Quintet, Neil Cowley Trio, Naked, Ours Samplus, Bogdan Vaida, Iulia Merca, Tiberius Simu, Nicoleta Ion, Ioana Cadar, Susan & Martin Weinert, Swing Mob, Aida și Noi, Mihai Dobre, Hot Club de Cluj, Jazzybirds, Platonic, Blazzaj, Benjamin Kolloch Quartet.

Special event in 2016: Jazz in the Park Bogata Edition - April 3 In 2016, Snoop Dogg accidentally checked-in on Facebook in Bogata (a small town from Mureș County, Romania) while trying to check-in in the Colombian capital Bogota. This incident caused a buzz in Romania, so Jazz in the Park organized a special edition there. Lineup: Maria Răducanu, Jazzybirds, Les Nuages, Danaga.

=== 2017 ===
The fifth edition of Jazz in the Park took place from June 26 to July 2. More than 70.000 people participated in the festival.

Lineup: Vintage Trouble, Dhaffer Youssef, Jojo Mayer & Nerve, Skalpel, Susana Baca, Viva Vox Choir, B.G.K.O., Tatran, Dj Vadim, Mammal Hands, Hidden Orchestra, Coma, Ours Samplus, Big Band Gaio, Dario Rossi, JazzyBit, B.I.M.S., Koszika and The Hotshots, Sebastian Spanache Trio, Bogdan Vaida, Szempöl Orchestra, Alex Calancea Band, Brum, Gauthier Toux Trio, Niogi & Pete Lockett, Le Minion, Hences Quartet, The Roots, Paolo Recchia Trio, Antál Gábor Trio, Interludic, Sain Mus, Eztán, Koszika és Csabika, Beyond Duo, BHF Trio, Lilin Quartet, Ana Munteanu Duo, Infusion, Berkes Quartet, Hot Club de Cluj, Blue Velvet, Edina Quartet, In Memoriam Szántó Lóránd by Say What Experiment.

Special event in 2017: The Festival has dedicated one day to the people of Pata Rât, a segregated area situated near the city landfill where approximately 300 families are living at the moment. The four communities in the area were formed after repeated evacuations of poor families, most of them being of Roma ethnicity, that had been taken away from the central parts of the city and moved on the outskirts. The population increased also after many villagers living near Pata Rât came to the landfill in search of means of survival. Therefore, by having concerts in this area, the Festival managed to draw attention to the people living in Pata in extremely poor conditions and to combat discrimination against this community. The event also took place in 2018.

=== 2018 ===
The sixth edition of Jazz in the Park took place from June 21 to July 1. It had an audience of 51.000 people.

Lineup: Nouvelle Vague, Fanfare Ciocârlia, Moonlight Breakfast, UFE, Forq, Bill Laurance, Jazzybit, Calibro 45, Kroke, Bully, Nik Bärtsch's Ronin, The Herbaliser, Gallowstreet, Soweto Kinch, Alfa Mist, Richard Bona Group, Byron, Sona Jobarteh, Juan de Marcos Afro-Cuban All Stars, Lucia, Balako, Silent Strike, Muse Quartet, Karpov not Kasparov, Koffie, Iordache, Bogdan Vaida, Dubase, Funkorporation, Sanem Kalfa & George Dumitru, Tzuc, Marius Mihalache Band, Alt Om, Iorga, Heion & The Echo Bits, Luiza Zan Trio, Sense, Big Dimm A’Band, Electroclown, Edina Quartet, Maria Casandra & Sorin Romanescu, Nicolas Simion – Sorin Romanescu Duo, Tasi Nóra & Azara, Mop Mop & Wayne Show, Nopame, Essential Notes, Exit Oz, Taraful lui Siminic, Infusion, Gabriela Costa & Alex Man, Moses X, A-C Leonte, Matei Crețiu-Codreanu, Văzduh, Indjstione Live Set, Renata Burca, Adam Ben Ezra, Heion, Sidewalk Troubadours, Mistah White, Andreea Secrieriu & Radu Leu.

=== 2019 ===
The seventh edition of Jazz in the Park took place from July 4 to 7. The festival brought almost 100.000 people in 4 days.

Lineup: Marcus Miller, Judith Hill, Ghost-Note, Delvon Lamarr Organ Trio, Shai Maestro Trio, DSM Contemporary Jazz Group, Hristo Yotsov: Jazz Cats, Malox, Noya Rao, Tiny Fingers, Chassol, Ron Minis, Festen, Ours Samplus, Kosmic Blues, Maru, Bully, Mr. Goju, UFe, FrankieZ Experiment & Tereza Catarov, MING, Frakatale, Alaska Snack Time, PianoHooligan, Iorga, Tzuc, Iordache, Zimbru, Bogdan Vaida, Andrei Puiu, Mitch Alive.

=== 2020 - Jazz in the Park Tiny Version ===
The eighth edition of Jazz in the Park should have taken place from June 25 to 28, but because of the pandemic it has moved from September 18 to 20, in a short version. This edition was the first to take place in the Ethnographic Park and was adapted for pandemic times with controlled entry and ticket access. It had an audience of 1.500 people.

Lineup: Teodora Brody Enache, Damian Drăghici Ethnic Jazz Band, JazzyBIT, RVQ, Julian M, Muntet, Diana Săveanu, Rubié Trio, As we exhale, Edina & Friends, Karak și Iorga, Two Sides Records cu Moss Farai & Alin Bittel.

=== 2021 - Jazz in the Park in The Hole City ===
The ninth edition of Jazz in the Park took place from September 2 to 5. This edition was also adapted for pandemic times and took place in several places in the city: Ethnographic Park, Iulius Parc, and USAMV (University of Agricultural Sciences and Veterinary Medicine of Cluj-Napoca). The festival brought almost 18.000 people over the 4 days.

Lineup: Fatoumata Diawara, José James with Taali, Dominic Miller, Fanfare Ciocârlia, Hania Rani, Nik Bärtsch, Marco Mezquida, Ron Minis, Taraf de Caliu, Balkan Taksim, Taraful de Vărbilău, Sorin Zlat Trio, Teodor Pop Solo, Bogdan Vaida, VRTW Artists: Dodo, Bully, Puiu, UFe, Karak, Iorga, Moonlight Breakfast, Mörk, Kornelia Binicevicz DJ set, Habibi Funk DJ set, Big Dimm a’Band, Luiza Zan, Alexandrina Hristov, Jazzybit, A-C Leonte, Arcuș Trio, Beats Remedy, Essential Notes, Rubié Trio.

=== 2022 ===
The tenth edition of Jazz in the Park took place between September 1 and 4. As in previous years, it was held in the Ethnographic Park “Romulus Vuia” in Cluj-Napoca.

Lineup: The Comet is Coming, Mircea Tiberian Trio, Trigon, Răzvan Cipca Trio, Andrei Petra, Erik Truffaz Quartet, Amadou & Mariam, Luiza Zan Duo, Marta Popovicim, Jazzbois, Asaf Avidan, Avishai Cohen Quartet, Mădălina Pavăl Orchestra, Zaharenco, Apifera, Skalpel, Ganna, Dhafer Youssef, Roberto Fonseca Trio, London Afrobeat Collective, Teodora Enache, Elena, Mândru Quartet, Maria Șimandi, Blazzaj

=== 2023 ===
The eleventh edition of Jazz in the Park took place between September 1-3. This year, it was also held in the "Romulus Vuia" Ethnographic Park in Cluj-Napoca, with the presence of over 18,000 people over 3 days.

Lineup: Billy Cobham Band, Fun Lovin’ Criminals, Theo Croker, Nightmares on Wax, Alexandru Andrieș, Jan Gunnar Hoff Trio, Tatran, Daykoda, Andi Moisescu, JazzQuarters Trio, Andra Botez, Mulatu Astatke, Ronnie Foster, Mansur Brown, The Heliocentrics, Mörk, Jazzybit, Andrei Irimia, Guts, Klawo, Moss Farai, The Cinematic Orchestra, Camilla George, Ada Milea, 7th Sense, DSP Orchestra, Nickodemus, KLT & Jessy Elsa Palma, Misha Blanos.

=== 2024 ===
The twelfth edition of Jazz in the Park took place from August 30 to September 1 in the Ethnographic Park "Romulus Vuia" in Cluj-Napoca. This year, over 20,000 people attended the 3-day festival.

Lineup: The Cinematic Orchestra, Mulatu Astatke, Billy Cobham Band, The Fun Lovin' Criminals, Marcus Miller, Ghost Note, Theo Croker, Camilla George, Nightmares on Wax, Mansur Brown, Ada Milea, Alexandru Andries, Andrei Irimia, Andi Moisescu (DJ set), Tatran, Jazzybit, Moss Farai.

=== 2025 ===
The thirteenth edition of Jazz in the Park took place from June 6 to 8 in the “Romulus Vuia” Ethnographic Park in Cluj-Napoca. Over 20,000 participants attended over the 3 days.

Lineup: Ibrahim Maalouf, Kokoroko, Nneka, Seun Kuti & Egypt 80, Biréli Lagrène Quartet, Alabaster DePlume, Mammal Hands, Omar Sosa & JazzyBIT, Jazzbois & Sorvina, Transylvania Jazz Orchestra, ShekBand, David Luca Quartet, Sandra Sangiao, Delvon Lamarr Organ Trio, Jacob Karlzon Trio.

== The Competition ==
The Jazz in the Park Competition took place from 2015 to 2019. The Competition focuses on young national and international bands that want to develop a music career. Its main purpose is to find young talents and to give them the possibility to perform in the festival, in front of thousands of people, and to pursue a more serious career in music. The winner gets to sign a two-year contract with the Jazz in the Park team and to perform in several other European jazz festivals.

2015
Artist	Award
HoTClub de Cluj	1st Place
FUNKorporation	2nd Place
3 O’clock	3rd Place
Funk’e Fetish	Special Prize for Composition

2016
Artist	Award
Cali Quartet	1st Place
Secret Formula	2nd Place
Koszika & The Hotshots	3rd Place
Szanto Lorant Attila	Special Prize for Composition

2017
Artist	Award
Antal Gábor Trio	1st Place
Paolo Recchia Trio	2nd Place
Hences Quartet	3rd Place
Diana Săveanu (Infusion)	Best Vocalist
Markosi József (Lilin Quartet)	Best Instrumentalist
Onișor Rodila (The Roots)	Best Arrangement

2018
Artist	Award
Frankiez Experiment	1st Place
Fekecs Akos Project	2nd Place
Lucia Rey Trio	3rd Place
Kovacs Dalma (Dalma)	Best Vocalist
Petru Haruta (The B-Groove)	Best Instrumentalist
Soular Quartet	Best Arrangement

2019
Artist	Award
Fraktale	1st Place
Ehud Ettun Trio	2nd Place
MING	3rd Place
Project ’’Connections	Best Jazz Composition
Michaela Turcerová, Jean-Paul Estievénart, Sergiu Chirileasa	Best Instrumentalist

2023
Artist	Award
KLAWO	1st Place
JazzQuarters Trio	2nd Place
NAUSYQA	3rd Place
Andrei Petrache Tudor	Best Jazz Composition

2024
Artist	Award
DAOUD	1st Place
LYDER RØED QUINTET	2nd Place
MAGRO	3rd Place
Nonconformist Anthology	Best Romanian Band
Jazz Family Trio ShekBand	Best Jazz Composition
David Luca Quartet	Jury Special Mention

2025
Artist	Award
JEMMA	1st Place
ZaZoo	2nd Place
LUNAMË	3rd Place
Sorvina	Prize from the public
MINDTHEGAP Trio	Best Romanian Band

== Impact ==
By organising the festival in Central Park and a series of concerts in Pata Rât, Jazz in the Park managed to give a new meaning to the public spaces of the city and to draw public attention onto the underprivileged communities.

Furthermore, in 2014 Jazz in the Park created a special fund through which the festival community could support several cultural projects with donations. For five years, the Jazz in the Park Fund managed to raise around 50.000 euros, an amount that made it possible for the organizers to finance nine cultural projects, and to offer seven scholarships for music and sports.

Also, in 2018, Jazz in the Park was the first Romanian festival to introduce reusable cups as a way of encouraging people to reduce their plastic waste.

== Awards and nominations ==
European Festival Award - Best Small Festival Award, 2019 Romanian PR Awards - Silver Award for Excellence for Jazz in the Park Fund, 2019 European Festival Awards – Shortlisted for the “A Stand” Award, 2018 Romanian Hospitality Awards – Shortlisted Best Festival, 2018 Romanian PR Awards – Silver Award for Excellence for the Jazz in the Park Fund, 2016 Romanian PR Awards – Silver Award for Excellence for the Jazz in the Park - Bogata Edition, 2016 Gala Premiilor in Jazz – Festival of the Year and Event Manager of the Year, 2016 European Festival Awards – Shortlisted Best Small Festival in Europe, 2014, 2015

== Founders ==
Jazz in the Park is founded by Fapte, an association that organizes cultural and artistic events. Besides Jazz in the Park, they founded Classic Unlimited, a tour designed to get classical music in unconventional places and Jazz in the Street, an event developed encourage artists to perform in the streets and to have an artistic exchange with the passersby.
