= Dumitru Solomon =

Dumitru Solomon was a Romanian author of essays, plays, and chronicles.

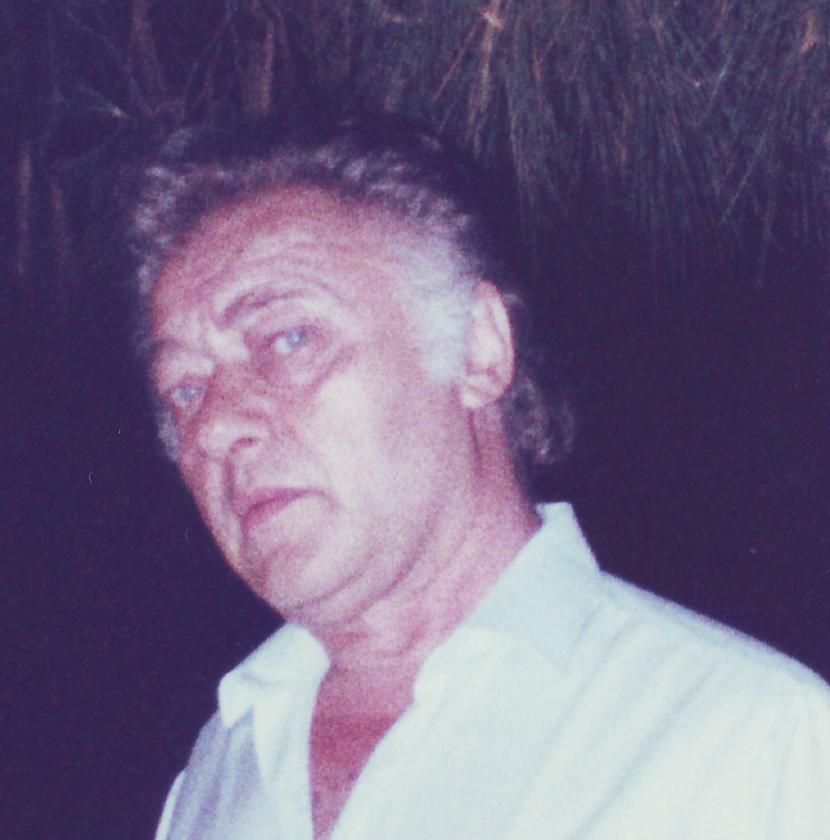
Dumitru Solomon

He was born in Galați on December 14, 1932 and died on 9 February, 2003. He attended the theoretical high-school in Bârlad. In 1955, he obtained his degree in philology in Bucharest. Between 1955-1962, he was the editor of Gazeta literară, then department chief at Luceafărul, and editor-in-chief of Teatrul azi magazine. He made his debut in Viața Românească, in 1953.

He was a laureate of the Romanian Academy (1978), and Writers Union and Association of Writers Union from Bucharest (1973). He received the U.N.I.T.E.R. award for the best Romanian play, Repetabila scenă a balconului (1995), and an award from the Ministry of Culture.

== Works ==
His works include:

- "Problema intelectualului în opera lui Camil Petrescu" (essay)
- "Dispariția" (dramatic sketch)
- Socrate, Diogene câinele
- "Teatrul ca metaforă" (essay)
- Teatrul
- Repetabila scenă a balconului
