= Choke Me =

2026 song by Alexandra Căpitănescu

Single by Alexandra Căpitănescu

from the album Choke Me
- Language: English
- Released: 13 February 2026
- Genre: Nu metal
- Length: 2:58
- Label: Universal Music Romania
- Songwriters: Alexandra Căpitănescu; Călin Grajdan; Silitră Elvis Claudiu; Ștefan Condrea
- Producers: Călin Grajdan; Silitră Elvis Claudiu

Music video
- "Choke Me" on YouTube

Eurovision Song Contest 2026 entry
- Country: Romania
- Artist: Alexandra Căpitănescu
- Composers: Alexandra Căpitănescu; Călin Grajdan; Ștefan Condrea; Silitră Elvis Claudiu
- Lyricists: Alexandra Căpitănescu; Silitră Elvis Claudiu

Finals performance
- Semi-final result: 2nd
- Semi-final points: 234
- Final result: 3rd
- Final points: 296

Entry chronology
- ◄ "D.G.T. (Off and On)" (2023)

"Choke Me" is a song by Romanian singer and Eurovision artist Alexandra Căpitănescu. The song represented Romania in the Eurovision Song Contest 2026 and finished in third place, becoming their highest scoring entry with 296 points.

== History ==
On 13 February, the song was announced to be taking part in the Romanian national final Selecția națională 2026 and was also released. On 2 March, the running order was made public, announcing that Căpitănescu would be performing eleventh out of twelve performers. After Selecția națională occurred on 4 March, it was revealed that Căpitănescu won the contest. She released a music video for the song later that month.

The song drew controversy for its title and subject matter, with the phrase "choke me," repeated thirty times in the song, being criticized for glamorising erotic asphyxiation, strangulation and sexual violence. Campaigners against sexual violence have described the song as "reckless," drawing specific focus on the lyrics "I want you to choke me" and "make my lungs explode". Clare McGlynn, a professor at Durham University, said that the song was “playing fast and loose with young women’s lives”; Căpitănescu defended her song by arguing that the song's message was metaphorical and representative of being overwhelmed by emotion and self-doubt.

After it was confirmed that the song had reached the final of Selecția națională, Căpitănescu was asked "...what message did she want to convey through her song?" and she responded "Choke me" is a call of desperation, because you're reaching your limit and all you want is to "suffocate" yourself with self-love and gentleness towards yourself. When we don't put obstacles in our way, we can reach our full potential. Let's speak our minds and free ourselves from the fears of the past." as well as commenting that Romanian pop musician Majii had contributed to writing the lyrics for the song. Căpitănescu further commented that "'The song is not about a man or romantic love, it's only about us and about the feeling of any human being and about the power [to] go beyond your limits and be the best versions of yourself,'...”.

On the 18 March, TVR released a statement further defending Căpitănescu and the song, stating that the song's stage concept was intended to "highlight the metaphorical nature" and "exclude any literal interpretation of the lyrics."

== Composition ==
Căpitănescu wrote the song with Călin Grajdan and Silitră Elvis Claudiu based on a beat Grajdan had on his laptop and the song also credits Ștefan Condrea as co-writer.

It was described by Louder as a nu-metal song and it includes elements of metal, rock, pop and includes a vocal phrase that is reminiscent of operatic vocals and Căpitănescu has commented that "It's a mix of several musical genres, but that's my madness because I like music in all its forms."

== Eurovision Song Contest 2026 ==
The Eurovision Song Contest 2026 took place at Wiener Stadthalle in Vienna, Austria, and consisted of two semi-finals held on 12 and 14 May and the final on 16 May 2026. During the allocation draw held on 12 January 2026, Romania was drawn to compete in the second semi-final, competing in the first half of the show. It qualified for the final and received 3rd place, equaling Romania's best result at Eurovision and obtaining the highest score in the history of the country's participation in the contest.

== Charts ==
=== Weekly charts ===
Weekly chart performance
Chart (2026)	Peak position
Austria (Ö3 Austria Top 40)	13
Finland (Suomen virallinen lista)	14
Greece International (IFPI)	4
Lithuania (AGATA)	7
Romania (Billboard)	3
Romania Airplay (TopHit)	42
Sweden (Sverigetopplistan)	48
Switzerland (Schweizer Hitparade)	89
UK Singles Sales (OCC)	27
UK Rock & Metal (Official Charts)	14

=== Monthly charts ===
Monthly chart performance
Chart (2026)	Peak position
Romania Airplay (TopHit)	68

== See also ==
- List of music released by Romanian artists that has charted in major music markets
