= D.G.T. (Off and On) =

2023 song by Theodor Andrei

Single by Theodor Andrei

from the album Fragil.
- Language: English, Romanian
- Released: 19 December 2022
- Genre: Sleaze rock
- Length: 3:42 (album version); 2:59 (National Final version); 2:54 (Eurovision Version)
- Label: Electrecord
- Songwriters: Theodor Andrei; Mikail Jahed; Luca de Mezzo; Luca Udățeanu

Theodor Andrei singles chronology
"Prigoria Teen Fest" (2022)	"D.G.T. (Off and On)" (2022)

Music video
- "D.G.T. (Off and On)" on YouTube

Eurovision Song Contest 2023 entry
- Country: Romania
- Artist: Theodor Andrei
- Composers: Theodor Andrei; Mikail Jahed
- Lyricists: Theodor Andrei; Mikail Jahed; Luca de Mezzo; Luca Udățeanu

Finals performance
- Semi-final result: 15th
- Semi-final points: 0

Entry chronology
- ◄ "Llámame" (2022)
- "Choke Me" (2026) ►

Official performance video
- "D.G.T. (Off and On)" (Second Semi-Final) on YouTube

"D.G.T. (Off and On)" (played on degete [ˈdedʒete], Romanian for 'fingers') is a song by Romanian singer Theodor Andrei, released on 16 December 2022. The song was originally released as a 2022 song as part of an album with Romanian singer Luca Udățeanu on Andrei's album, Fragil. After being remade as a solo-version made specifically to enter Selecția Națională 2023, the Romanian national selection for the Eurovision Song Contest 2023, the song would manage to win the competition, therefore earning the Romanian spot for that year's contest.

== Background ==
In interviews, Theodor Andrei expressed a desire to mix several musical genres that would both appeal to Romanians and foreign listeners, wanting to create a song that Romania had "never sent to the grand final."

== Composition ==
Andrei describes "D.G.T. (Off and On)" as "a love story where reason is in conflict with instinct, where passion and safety duel." The song speaks about the good and bad sides of falling in love, including passion, sex, maturity, lies, and other ideas closely related towards love. Andrei reportedly wrote the instrumental "out of boredom", and with the help of friend Luca De Mezzo, would then write the pre-chorus of the song. It would take around one week for Andrei to complete the instrumental and the first verses of the song. Vulture's Jon O'Brien noted that the song "is sleaze rock with the emphasis on the sleaze".

== Eurovision Song Contest ==
=== Selecția Națională 2023 ===
Selecția Națională 2023 was the national final format developed by TVR in order to select Romania's entry for the Eurovision Song Contest 2023 that was held on 11 February 2023, featuring 12 competing songs. At the end of the voting, the song was revealed to have won the competition, thus earning the Romanian spot for the Eurovision Song Contest 2023.

=== At Eurovision ===
According to Eurovision rules, all nations with the exceptions of the host country and the "Big Five" (France, Germany, Italy, Spain and the United Kingdom) are required to qualify from one of two semi-finals in order to compete for the final; the top ten countries from each semi-final progress to the final. The European Broadcasting Union (EBU) split up the competing countries into six different pots based on voting patterns from previous contests, with countries with favourable voting histories put into the same pot. On 31 January 2023, an allocation draw was held which placed each country into one of the two semi-finals, as well as which half of the show they would perform in. Romania was placed into the second semi-final, held on 11 May 2023, and was scheduled to perform in the first half of the show. Romania did not qualify for the final getting zero points as the final result.
