= Austria in the Eurovision Song Contest 2026 =

- Eurovision Song Contest 2026
- Participating broadcaster: Österreichischer Rundfunk (ORF)
- Country: Austria
- Selection process: Vienna Calling – Wer singt für Österreich?
- Selection date: 20 February 2026

Competing entry
- Song: "Tanzschein"
- Artist: Cosmó
- Songwriters: Benjamin Gedeon; Elias Stejskal; Ella Stern

Placement
- Final result: 24th, 6 points

Participation chronology

Austria was represented at the Eurovision Song Contest 2026 with the song "Tanzschein", written by Benjamin Gedeon, Elias Stejskal and Ella Stern, and performed by Gedeon under his stage name Cosmó. The Austrian participating broadcaster, Österreichischer Rundfunk (ORF), organised the national final Vienna Calling – Wer singt für Österreich? to select its entry for the contest. In addition, ORF was also the host broadcaster and staged the event at Wiener Stadthalle in Vienna, after winning the previous edition with the song "Wasted Love" by JJ.

== Background ==
Prior to the 2026 contest, Österreichischer Rundfunk (ORF) had participated in the Eurovision Song Contest representing Austria fifty-seven times since its first entry in 1957. It had won the contest on three occasions: in 1966 with the song "Merci, Chérie" performed by Udo Jürgens, in 2014 with the song "Rise Like a Phoenix" performed by Conchita Wurst, and in 2025 with the song "Wasted Love" performed by JJ. Following the introduction of semi-finals for the 2004 contest, Austria had featured in only ten finals. Its least successful result had been last place, which it had achieved on eight occasions, most recently in 2012. It had also received nul points on four occasions; in 1962, 1988, 1991, and 2015.

As part of its duties as participating broadcaster, ORF organises the selection of its entry in the Eurovision Song Contest and broadcasts the event in the country. ORF confirmed its intentions to participate and host the 2026 contest immediately after the 2025 final on 18 May 2025. From 2011 to 2013 as well as in 2015 and 2016, ORF set up national finals with several artists to choose both the song and performer to compete at Eurovision for Austria, with both the public and a panel of jury members involved in the selection. In 2014 and since 2017, ORF has held an internal selection to choose the artist and song. On 2 August 2025, the broadcaster announced that its entry for the 2026 contest would be selected through a national final.

== Before Eurovision ==
=== Vienna Calling – Wer singt für Österreich? ===
Vienna Calling – Wer singt für Österreich? ("Vienna Calling – Who sings for Austria?") was the national final organised by ORF to select its entry for the Eurovision Song Contest 2026. The event took place on 20 February 2026 at the ORF Center in Vienna, hosted by Alice Tumler and 2018 Austrian representative Cesár Sampson, and broadcast on ORF 1 as well as streamed online via the broadcaster's streaming platform ORF ON and the Eurovision Song Contest's official YouTube channel with commentary in English by Emily Busvine. The first part of the national final was watched by 457,000 viewers in Austria with a market share of 25%, while the second part was watched by 470,000 viewers in Austria with a market share of 30%.

==== Format ====
Twelve songs competed in the competition where the winner was selected by public voting and a 43-member expert jury panel. The jury results created an overall ranking from which points from 1–8, 10 and 12 were distributed to the top ten entries. Viewers were able to vote via telephone or SMS and the overall ranking of the entries was also assigned scores from 1–8, 10 and 12. After the combination of the jury and public votes, the entry with the highest number of points was selected as the winner.

Jury members
- Alan Roy Scott
- Alex Wagner
- Alina Rauch
- Alkis Vlassakakis
- Armin Doppelbauer
- Armin Luttenberger
- Christian Ude
- Christina Böck
- Constanze Kreuzberger
- David Pearson
- David Steiner
- Heide Rampetzreiter
- Jakob Rabitsch
- Jamala
- Klaus Woryna
- Linnea Gawell
- Lisa Schneider
- Magdalena Kanev
- Marco Schreuder
- Marcos Tritremmel
- Markus Spiegel
- Martin Fichter-Wöß
- Martina Rauner
- Max Bauer
- Melanie Wehbe
- Melinda Markowitsch
- Melisa Kaymaz
- Michael Schulte
- Parov Stelar
- Patrick Schubert
- Peter Wolfgruber
- Robert Fröwein
- Romy Reis
- Sabine Reiter
- Sascha Mutavdzic
- Shari Short
- Stefanie Groiss-Horowitz
- Theresa Kahr
- Thomas Gruber
- Thomas Zeidler
- Valentina Pisoni
- Violet Skies
- Wolfgang Pammer

==== Competing entries ====
ORF invited all interested artists to submit their songs to the broadcaster between 4 August 2025 and 15 October 2025. Music experts Eberhard Forcher and Peter Schreiber (who have both been working together on the selection of the Austrian entries since 2024) also nominated an additional 60 to 70 artists to submit songs and organised a songwriting camp in June 2025 where 18 songs were created for the selection. The broadcaster received over 500 submissions at the closing of the deadline, which were reviewed by a team of ORF editors and music professionals consisting of Forcher, Schreiber and Cesár Sampson. 30 entries were shortlisted for a live casting round on 22 and 23 November 2025, and the twelve artists and songs selected to compete in the national final were revealed on 15 December 2025. On 18 December 2025, Tamara Flores withdrew and was replaced by Sidrit Vokshi.

Key: Entry withdrawn Replacement entry

Artist	Song	Songwriter(s)
Anna Sophie	"Superhuman"	Anna-Sophie Heibl; Guiliano Sannicandro; Jonas Strondl
Bamlak Werner	"We Are Not Just One Thing"	Bamlak Werner; Dominik Wendl; Elias Stejskal
Cosmó	"Tanzschein"	Benjamin Gedeon; Elias Stejskal; Ella Stern
David Kurt	"Pockets Full of Snow"	David Kopelent; Fabian Hainzl
Frevd	"Riddle"	Alvin Ehrnberger; Andreas Wöckinger; Christopher Stummer; Florian Rauscher; Lukas Mantsch
Julia Steen	"Julia"	Bob Inski; Danielle Lamb; Elżbieta Steinmetz; Julia Wastian
Kayla Krystin	"I brenn"	Gregor Glanz; Kayla Krystin; Manuel Stix
Lena Schaur	"Painted Reality"	Lena Schaur; Michael Oberhauser; Thomas Tolloy
Nikotin	"Unsterblich"	Dominic Muhrer; Niko Totenberg; Richardo Bettiol; Tamara Olorga
Philip Piller	"Das Leben ist Kunst"	Julia Kautz; Lukas Hillebrand; Philip Piller
Reverend Stomp	"Mescalero Ranger"	Christoph Mooser; Florian Strober; Franz Gries; Tobias Voges
Sidrit Vokshi	"Wenn ich rauche"	David Slomo; Sidrit Vokshi; Thomas Kröss
~~Tamara Flores~~	~~"Chingona"~~	Johannes Römer; Tamara Mayr

==== Final ====
The final took place on 20 February 2026. Twelve songs competed where the combination of votes from a jury panel and a public vote selected "Tanzschein" performed by Cosmó as the winner. In addition to the performances of the competing entries, a panel consisting of Caroline Athanasiadis, 2007 Austrian representative Eric Papilaya and 2025 Eurovision winner JJ provided commentary on the songs; JJ also performed his winning song "Wasted Love" and his new single "Shapeshifter".

Final – 20 February 2026
R/O	Artist	Song	Jury	Televote		Total	Place
R/O	Artist	Song	Jury	Votes	Points	Total	Place
1	Anna-Sophie	"Superhuman"	2	5,284	7	9	6
2	Sidrit Vokshi	"Wenn ich rauche"	0	3,875	5	5	9
3	Kayla Krystin	"I brenn"	8	4,072	6	14	4
4	Reverend Stomp	"Mescalero Ranger"	3	1,370	0	3	10
5	Bamlak Werner	"We Are Not Just One Thing"	4	8,892	10	14	3
6	Philip Piller	"Das Leben ist Kunst"	1	1,506	1	2	11
7	Nikotin	"Unsterblich"	7	3,363	4	11	5
8	David Kurt	"Pockets Full of Snow"	0	1,253	0	0	12
9	Julia Steen	"Julia"	6	2,625	2	8	8
10	Frevd	"Riddle"	5	2,725	3	8	7
11	Lena Schaur	"Painted Reality"	12	8,667	8	20	2
12	Cosmó	"Tanzschein"	10	10,664	12	22	1

== At Eurovision ==
The Eurovision Song Contest 2026 took place at the Wiener Stadthalle in Vienna, Austria, and consisted of two semi-finals held on the respective dates of 12 and 14 May and the final on 16 May 2026. All nations with the exceptions of the host country and the "Big Four" (France, Germany, Italy, and the United Kingdom) were required to qualify from one of two semi-finals in order to compete in the final; the top ten countries from each semi-final progressed to the final. As the host country, Austria automatically qualified to compete in the final on 16 May 2026, but was also required to broadcast and vote in one of the two semi-finals. This was decided via a draw held during the semi-final allocation draw on 12 January 2026, when it was announced that Austria would be voting in the second semi-final. Despite being an automatic qualifier for the final, the Austrian entry was also performed during the semi-final. On 17 March 2026, during the Heads of Delegation meeting, Austria was drawn to close the final in position 25.

=== Voting ===
==== Points awarded to Austria ====
Points awarded to Austria (Final)
Score	Televote	Jury
12 points		
10 points		
8 points		
7 points		
6 points		
5 points	Germany	
4 points		
3 points		
2 points		
1 point		Luxembourg

==== Points awarded by Austria ====
Points awarded by Austria (Semi-final 2)
Score	Televote	Jury
12 points	Bulgaria	Norway
10 points	Romania	Australia
8 points	Australia	Denmark
7 points	Luxembourg	Switzerland
6 points	Norway	Romania
5 points	Ukraine	Czechia
4 points	Switzerland	Malta
3 points	Albania	Ukraine
2 points	Malta	Bulgaria
1 point	Denmark	Albania

Points awarded by Austria (Final)
Score	Televote	Jury
12 points	Bulgaria	Poland
10 points	Australia	Denmark
8 points	Croatia	Israel
7 points	Israel	Australia
6 points	Italy	Finland
5 points	Moldova	Czechia
4 points	Ukraine	France
3 points	Romania	Norway
2 points	Greece	Italy
1 point	Finland	Greece

==== Detailed voting results ====
Each participating broadcaster assembles a seven-member jury panel consisting of music industry professionals who are citizens of the country they represent and two of which have to be between 18 and 25 years old. Each jury, and individual jury member, is required to meet a strict set of criteria regarding professional background, as well as diversity in gender and age. No member of a national jury was permitted to be related in any way to any of the competing acts in such a way that they cannot vote impartially and independently. The individual rankings of each jury member as well as the nation's televoting results were released shortly after the grand final.

The following members comprised the Austrian jury:

- Jakob Stiedl
- Lukas Perman
- Michael Bencsics
- Ilia Hollweg
- Lena Schaur
- Nastja Zahour
- Tina Ruprechter

Detailed voting results from Austria (Semi-final 2)
R/O	Country	Jury									Televote	
R/O	Country	Juror A	Juror B	Juror C	Juror D	Juror E	Juror F	Juror G	Rank	Points	Rank	Points
01	Bulgaria	5	7	9	7	10	11	4	9	2	1	12
02	Azerbaijan	14	11	6	14	9	13	13	13		15	
03	Romania	2	2	11	5	14	3	10	5	6	2	10
04	Luxembourg	15	14	8	6	11	14	15	14		4	7
05	Czechia	7	3	12	13	7	2	3	6	5	12	
06	Armenia	6	6	10	8	15	10	7	12		14	
07	Switzerland	8	1	7	2	4	12	9	4	7	7	4
08	Cyprus	12	12	5	9	13	5	6	11		11	
09	Latvia	13	5	13	12	12	15	14	15		13	
10	Denmark	3	9	4	1	3	9	11	3	8	10	1
11	Australia	1	8	1	4	5	8	5	2	10	3	8
12	Ukraine	10	10	14	10	1	4	8	8	3	6	5
13	Albania	9	15	15	11	8	1	12	10	1	8	3
14	Malta	11	13	2	15	6	7	2	7	4	9	2
15	Norway	4	4	3	3	2	6	1	1	12	5	6

Detailed voting results from Austria (Final)
R/O	Country	Jury									Televote	
R/O	Country	Juror A	Juror B	Juror C	Juror D	Juror E	Juror F	Juror G	Rank	Points	Rank	Points
01	Denmark	17	1	14	12	2	3	3	2	10	16	
02	Germany	20	14	19	21	14	6	21	20		13	
03	Israel	3	17	1	15	9	2	4	3	8	4	7
04	Belgium	15	15	8	19	10	20	7	17		24	
05	Albania	12	18	23	5	20	18	23	19		15	
06	Greece	16	4	2	20	17	23	15	10	1	9	2
07	Ukraine	21	22	16	4	6	17	19	13		7	4
08	Australia	9	5	5	6	5	4	2	4	7	2	10
09	Serbia	22	24	21	22	23	24	24	24		12	
10	Malta	2	23	17	17	18	10	20	12		17	
11	Czechia	1	16	6	3	12	7	12	6	5	21	
12	Bulgaria	13	9	10	18	16	14	6	15		1	12
13	Croatia	18	21	22	7	19	19	22	22		3	8
14	United Kingdom	24	13	24	24	24	22	18	23		22	
15	France	5	3	12	2	8	13	14	7	4	11	
16	Moldova	4	19	13	8	22	21	16	16		6	5
17	Finland	14	2	7	16	4	16	1	5	6	10	1
18	Poland	6	11	11	1	1	1	8	1	12	14	
19	Lithuania	23	8	18	14	13	15	17	21		23	
20	Sweden	19	6	15	13	11	12	9	14		19	
21	Cyprus	11	12	20	11	15	11	11	18		20	
22	Italy	8	7	4	23	7	5	13	9	2	5	6
23	Norway	7	10	9	9	3	8	5	8	3	18	
24	Romania	10	20	3	10	21	9	10	11		8	3
25	Austria											
