= Tanzschein =

2026 single by Cosmó

Single by Cosmó

from the EP Lieber tanz ich weiter
- Language: German
- English title: Dance(-ing) Licence
- Released: 5 February 2026
- Length: 2:48
- Songwriters: Benjamin Gedeon; Ella Stern; Elias Stejskal
- Producers: Nono Punch; Patrick Tricky Kummenecker

Music video
- "Tanzschein" on YouTube

Eurovision Song Contest 2026 entry
- Country: Austria
- Artist: Cosmó
- Language: German
- Composers: Benjamin Gedeon; Ella Stern; Elias Stejskal

Finals performance
- Final result: 24th
- Final points: 6

Entry chronology
- ◄ "Wasted Love" (2025)

Official performance video
- "Tanzschein" (second semi-final) on YouTube "Tanzschein" (grand final) on YouTube

"Tanzschein" (transl. 'Dance(-ing) Licence' (Note: As "Tanz" means dance and "Schein" means licence, "Tanzschein" can be directly translated as 'Dance Licence.' On the other hand, the title seems to be based on the word "Führerschein" (Driving/Driver's Licence), so another possible translation is 'Dancing Licence,' which maintains the original meaning.)) is a song by Cosmó, the stage name of the Austrian singer Benjamin Gedeon. It was written by Gedeon, Elias Stejskal, and Ella Stern. It represented Austria in the Eurovision Song Contest 2026, and reached number two on the Austrian Singles Chart.

== Composition ==
Gedeon had completed one or two song writing sessions with the writing team for the song when one day he was out jogging in Vienna and then he pulled out his phone and sang the first line of the chorus "Sie brauchen einen Tanzschein" (You need a dance(-ing) licence) with Gedeon commenting that "I showed that to my producer and he said, "Yeah, that's good. Maybe let's write, write like one or two other songs as well.", but I couldn't focus. I was, I was so focused on [that song]... ...I had to, I had to do it."

In relation to the song's lyrics Cosmo has commented that "...I was in a club the first time, and there wasn't any dancing, but there wasn't really any talking either. It's just standing around, and... I don't know what they're thinking... Nobody starts dancing... ...And I think you should actually dance and enjoy the music. That's the only way to really forget about everyday life and enjoy life... Letting go a little, listening to yourself. And above all, dancing together, not just for yourself, but also with others."

== Music video ==
When asked about the ideas behind the music video, Cosmó responded: "the producer Phil and the lovely team from Sonority had like this idea that it's... you can't really put away your inner animal, you know, it's always in there. That's why we also have that scene where I'm looking in the mirror and there's a lion. It's more about letting go of your inner animal... kind of dancing away your inner animal... And we wanted to show that in in the music video. And also this kind of transition from animal to human where the lovely Hannah, um takes off her mask and becomes a human, uh and then dances with us all together."

== Eurovision Song Contest ==
=== Vienna Calling – Wer singt für Österreich? ===
Cosmó was announced as one of the 12 artists that would compete for the Austrian National Selection for Eurovision 2026, "Vienna Calling – Wer singt für Österreich?." His competing entry for the Selection, "Tanzschein" was released on 7 February 2026. The Selection took place on 20 February 2026 in Vienna. After the voting segment, Tanzschein placed first which meant that Cosmó would represent Austria in 2026.

When asked about how the live performance for the national selection came together Cosmó responded "One evening, we were sitting with the band, racking our brains: 'Where can we get dancers?' 'We'd love to have dancers with us.' Then we looked at each other in the band and thought, 'Don't you guys want to do that?' And everyone was like, 'Yeah, let's do it!'".

=== At Eurovision ===
The Eurovision Song Contest 2026 took place at Wiener Stadthalle in Vienna, Austria, and consisted of two semi-finals to held on the respective dates of 12 and 14 May and the final on 16 May 2026. As the host country, Austria automatically qualified to the final and performed in 25th (last place) at the show. Additionally, Cosmó performed Tanzschein in the second semi-final, after Cyprus's Antigoni and before Latvia's Atvara. In the final, the song finished 24th, only earning six points.

== Charts ==
Weekly chart performance
Chart (2026)	Peak position
Austria (Ö3 Austria Top 40)	2
Austria Airplay (IFPI)	20
Lithuania (AGATA)	99

== Certifications ==
Region	Certification	Certified units/sales
Austria (IFPI Austria)	Gold	15,000^{‡}
^{‡} Sales+streaming figures based on certification alone.
