= Cosmó =

Austrian and Hungarian singer (born 2006)

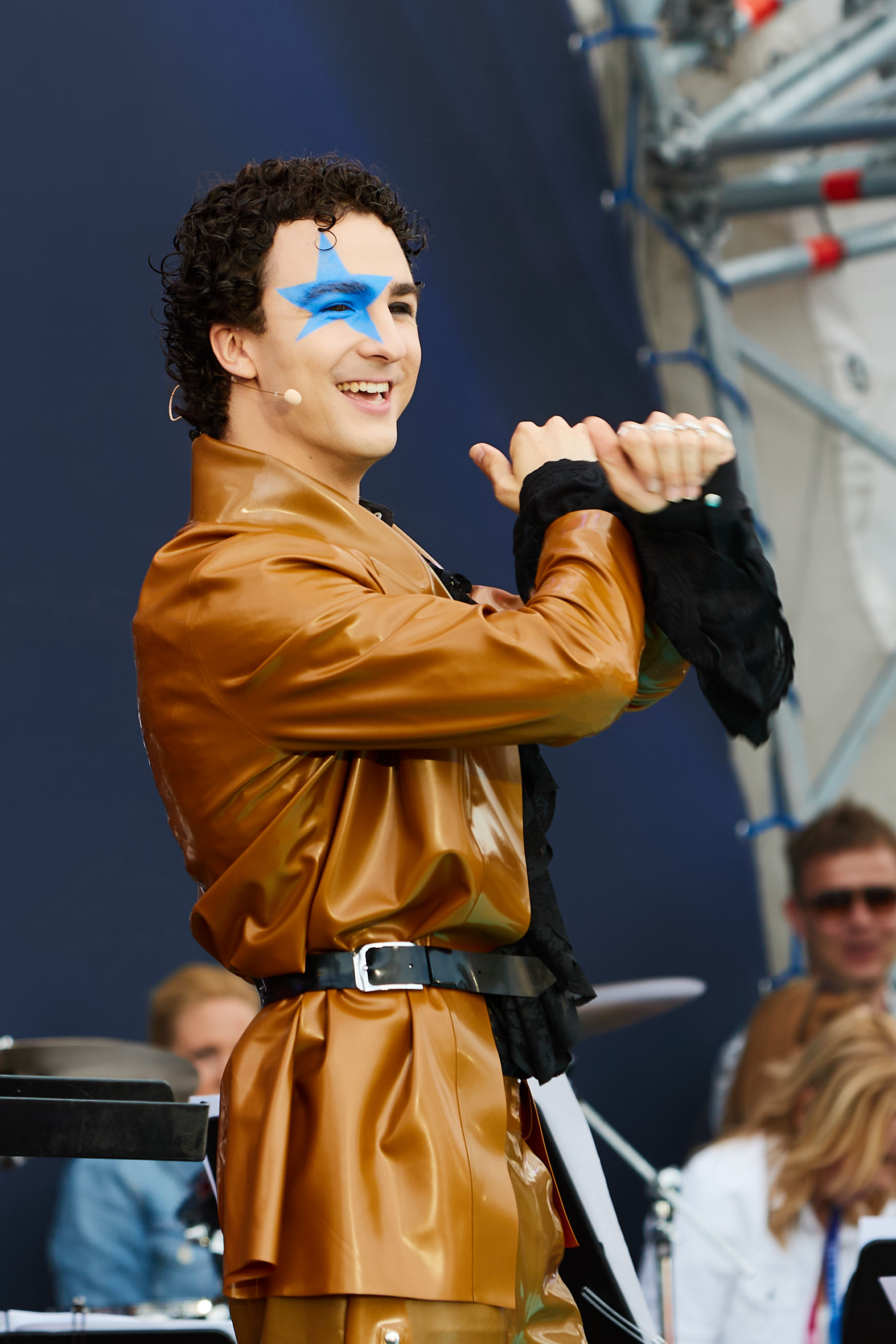
- Cosmó in 2026

Background information
- Born: Benjamin Gedeon; 18 June 2006 (age 20); Budapest, Hungary
- Origin: Halbturn, Burgenland, Austria
- Occupations: Singer; songwriter
- Instrument: Vocals
- Years active: 2021 - present
- Website: www.cosmomachtmusik.com

Benjamin Gedeon (born 18 June 2006), known professionally as Cosmó (stylized in all caps), is an Austrian and Hungarian singer and songwriter. He represented Austria in the Eurovision Song Contest 2026 on home soil in Vienna with the song "Tanzschein".

== Early life ==
Gedeon was born in Budapest, Hungary and grew up in Halbturn, Burgenland, Austria. He was born to a German father and Hungarian mother. At the age of four, he attended early musical education at the Neusiedl am See Central Music School. Two years later, Gedeon began piano lessons at the same school. He has been taking singing lessons since he was 13. Around this age, Gedeon also began writing down melodies and lyrics. Under his birth name, he released his first songs, which he produced himself.

== Career ==
In 2020, Gedeon auditioned for the German singing competition The Voice Kids for the first time and was eliminated after the second round. He returned in 2022, and this time Gedeon not only progressed further in the scouting process but also reached the final of the tenth season with coach Álvaro Soler, where he sang two Frank Sinatra songs.

As a result, Gedeon performed at two of Soler's concerts, at the Kasematten open-air stage in Graz's Schlossberg and at the Gasometer in Vienna. He also performed at the warm-up for the Starnacht am Neusiedlersee, at the Gols folk festival and the Halbturn Tschardakenfest, played a piano concert at Kittsee Castle with his piano teacher, Gebhard Rauscher, simultaneously on two grand pianos, and met the governor of Burgenland, who had watched Gedeon's performances on television, in October. In December, he gave his first radio interview on the Burgenland program "Mahlzeit Burgenland" on Radio Burgenland.

In July 2021, Gedeon won the podium.jazz.pop.rock... competition for young musicians from Burgenland with a vocal and piano performance of his self-composed jazz piece "Fall into Your Arms". He also participated in the Burgenland Song Challenge in autumn 2023 with the song "Fall into Your Arms". For this, Gedeon formed a band for live concerts and studio recordings, which can be heard in his song.

On 15 December 2025, it was announced that Gedeon would compete in the Austrian national final for the Eurovision Song Contest 2026, dubbed Vienna Calling – Wer singt für Österreich?, with the song "Tanzschein" under the stage name Cosmó. He won in the final on 20 February 2026, thus earning the right to represent Austria on home soil. He placed 24th in the Eurovision final.

== Artistry ==
Gedeon has commented that his stage name and the blue star on his face came about when "Shortly before the Vienna Calling audition, I said, "Wait a minute, I'm going to quickly change my name.' Because it's so different from anything I've done before. Back then, I wrote in English, kind of like pop-rock, classic rock style, and now it's more like German pop. So I thought, 'Okay, I'm basically starting over.' Then Cosmó came along, and I was like, "Okay, Cosmó needs something, something visual that fits the name," and then the star came about."

== Discography ==
Credits taken from iTunes.

=== Studio albums ===
List of studio albums, with selected details
| Title | Details |
|---|---|
| Lieber träum ich weiter | Release date: 25 September 2026; Label: Töchtersöhne; Formats: CD, LP, digital download, streaming |

=== Extended plays ===
List of EPs, with selected details
| Title | Details |
|---|---|
| From My Room | Released: 13 June 2025; Label: Self-released; Formats: Digital download |
| Lieber tanz ich weiter | Released: 8 May 2026; Label: Töchtersöhne; Formats: Digital download |

=== Singles ===
List of singles, with year, album and chart positions
| Title | Year | Peak chart positions | | | Album or EP |
| Title | Year | AUT | AUT Air. | LTU | Album or EP |
|---|---|---|---|---|---|
| "Give Me a Moment" | 2022 | — | — | — | Non-album singles |
| "Pizza" (featuring Erich Galacho & Francesco Ialazzo) | 2022 | — | — | — | Non-album singles |
| "Fall into Your Arms" | 2023 | — | — | — | Non-album singles |
| "Faster Than Ever Before" | 2024 | — | — | — | Non-album singles |
| "Play Another Song" | 2025 | — | — | — | From My Room |
| "28 Hours" | 2025 | — | — | — | From My Room |
| "Don't Dream It's Over" | 2025 | — | — | — | From My Room |
| "Tanzschein" | 2026 | 2 | 20 | 99 | Lieber tanz ich weiter |
| "Runterspülen" | 2026 | — | — | — | Lieber träum ich weiter |
"—" denotes a recording that did not chart or was not released in that territory.

Awards and achievements
| Preceded by JJ with "Wasted Love" | Austria in the Eurovision Song Contest; 2026 | Succeeded by TBA |
