= Eliza Legzdina =

Latvian singer

Elīza Legzdiņa
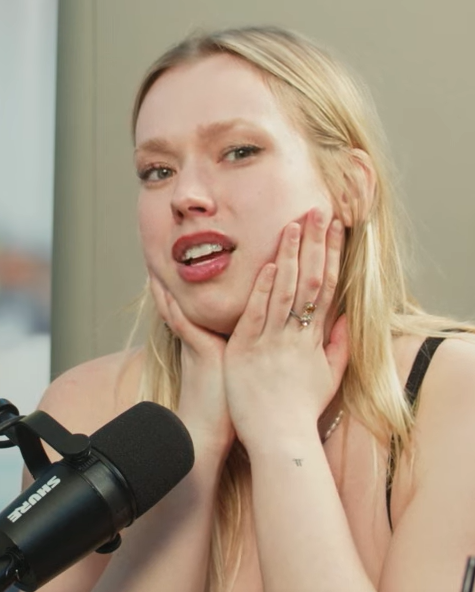
- Legzdiņa appearing on a May 2024 episode of The Coco Novak Show

Background information
- Also known as: LEGZDINA
- Born: 6 October 1993 (age 33); Ogre, Latvia
- Occupations: Singer, songwriter, rapper
- Instrument: Vocals
- Years active: 2019–present
- Label: 7wallace

Elīza Legzdiņa (pronounced [ˈeliːza ˈlægzdiɲa], born 6 October 1993, also known as LEGZDINA) is a Latvian-British musician. Born in Ogre, she moved to the UK for her education, and studied at the University of East Anglia, from which she graduated in 2014. She funded a part-time master's degree at Goldsmiths, University of London, by working a series of odd jobs including a spell at Jukedeck. She began releasing her own sex-positive and body-positive tracks in May 2019, which have been featured in soundtracks, television programmes, the video game EA Sports FC 24, and an iPad commercial. Her 2020 track "Tom & Jerry" was ranked by DMY as the 23rd best track of that year, and she released the EPs Iron Curtain Golden Pussy and Silver Linings in 2020 and 2022. She is also a member of Loud LDN.

== Life and career ==
=== Early life ===
Elīza Legzdiņa was born on 6 October in Ogre, Latvia, and has two younger brothers. She began performing at the age of three at her local culture house, to which her grandmother would take her every evening, and would spend her birthdays at the circus. She studied English at the International School of Latvia, before reading classical opera at the University of East Anglia and writing her dissertation on hip-hop, graduating aged twenty in 2014. In an interview published in Jauns.lv in April 2020, Legzdina asserted that she had moved to the UK aged thirteen after begging her parents to let her stay at a boarding school in Ascot, Berkshire.

Legzdina appearing on a May 2024 episode of The Coco Novak Show

Legzdina studied at Goldsmiths University, where she studied for a master's degree for six months part time. She juggled this with concurrent jobs at a pub and in telesales as her parents had financial difficulties and were no longer able to support her financially. After temporarily dropping out, she interned at Purple Public Relations, and then spent a period at a tech startup who were trying to create paperless tickets for the transport industry. She then took a post at Jukedeck, a system that generated its own music, before resuming her studies part time. While working at Jukedeck, she began composing poetry, and began making her own songs after buying a microphone.

Legzdina cofounded the poetry night Say It Back in January 2019 with Affly Johnson. Of an early 2020 workshop, Time Out wrote that Legzdina and Johnson "promise[d] to help you take your '2019 Ls' and 'spin them into 2020 Ws'". Around this time, she took a post at a music management company. Legzdina began releasing music in May 2019 when she was in her mid-20s, having bought gear following a breakup. In an interview with Tirade.world, she stated that she initially resisted making music as she was consumed by the idea that she would not "be making Beyoncé level albums" and that she became more confident as a result of studio time and open mics.

=== Iron Curtain Golden Pussy and Silver Linings ===
In February 2020, she released "Tom & Jerry", an alt-pop track with hip-hop elements written about casual sex. Later that year, DMY ranked it as the 23rd best track of 2020. She then released the EP Iron Curtain Golden Pussy, which incorporated the name of the political boundary dividing Europe during the Cold War, and likened men's interest in controlling precious metals to their attempts at controlling women. The EP's tracks "Jelly" and "Tic Toc" featured the black artists Bryte and Janelle Wynter; in a September 2020 interview with Schön! Magazine, she stated that she had made a point of showcasing black talent on her works, having observed her black and brown friends suffering from racism while in school. A music video would later be released for "Tic Toc", and the track would later be used in an episode of Michaela Coel's I May Destroy You. Legzdina then released "Curse 4 U", a track about the patriarchy, which was later used in the soundtrack for Need for Speed Unbound.

In June 2021, after being contacted by someone who had spotted her performing at an open mic in Peckham, she contributed to the track "Fudge" by Idris Elba, a track about self-confidence. The track constituted the first of a series of tracks for his label 7Wallace. The following month, she featured on "Rose Tinted", a track by Crate Classics, a duo comprising Aaron Horn and Jamie Rodigan, the son of David Rodigan. In January 2022, she performed at Eurosonic Noorderslag; Ben Jolley of NME wrote that her "sex-positive bangers, performed in an Art Deco warehouse living room, mark[ed] her out as a thrilling name to watch". She then featured on Lau.ra's "Blow" and on "DeepBluSea", a track on Blu Tempo's June 2022 EP Pessimismus.

"Moody" by Mauriks feat. Eliza Legzdina

Legzdina performed at Latitude Festival in July 2022 and released "Composure", a track about falling in love, the month after. "Composure" featured on her September 2022 EP Silver Linings, as did "Real Girl", for which a video was subsequently released. Later that month, Electronic Arts announced that it would use Legzdina's collaboration with Ruckspin on the soundtrack of their video game FIFA 23; they would later use Legzdina's collaboration with Bianca Oblivion "EZ 4 Me" in their video game EA Sports FC 24. In November 2022, Apple used her subsequent Ruckspin collaboration "Yum!" for their "Brand New Flavor" advertisement for their tenth-generation iPad. Caitlin Stephens of Looper.com opined that the song's lyrics, written about food and namechecking lemon, peach, strawberry, chocolate, cinnamon, and the "pretty paper" they were wrapped in, suited the commercial. "Yum!" also featured in the summer 2023 series of Love Island.

=== Later releases and participation in Supernova 2026 ===
In February 2023, she was a guest artist at the finale of Supernova 2023, the Latvian national final for the Eurovision Song Contest 2023, where she performed "Come Roll With Me" with Beanie, a drummer who had performed with the British drum and bass band Rudimental. She supported that band at their August 2023 performance at South Facing Festival in Crystal Palace, London, and asserted in a September 2023 interview with the TV3 show 900 seconds that they had produced an upcoming EP for her. She released the drum and bass track "Come Roll With Me" as "Legzdina" in July 2024 and the jungle track "Bitter Truth" the month after; both "Come Roll With Me" and "Bitter Truth" were produced by Slxm Sol and Rudimental's Piers and Kesi.

In April 2023, she contributed a Latvian rap verse to Rolands Če's "Bam Bam", which was released alongside a video supported by the Tuborg Brewery and featuring numerous local content creators and celebrities. That August, she and MoreNight featured on the amapiano track "U Be U" by former Roll Deep member Manga Saint Hilaire. In May 2024, she stated that she had set up her own record label, "Mana Naba", and that she had named it after the Latvian for "my bellybutton" in order to celebrate her female lineage and the sacrifices her mother had made for her. As "Legzdina", she featured on Sara Landry's hard techno track "Pressure" in August 2024.

On 20 November 2025 she was announced as one of the participants of Supernova 2026, in which she competed for the right to represent Latvia at the Eurovision Song Contest 2026 with her song "Ribbon". Legzdina qualified from the second semi-final of Supernova, and went on to place 9th out of 10 in the final.

== Artistry and personal life ==
Legzdina is queer and has dual citizenship. In an interview with Jauns.lv published in April 2020, Legzdina wrote that she was inspired as a child by Beyoncé's choreography and self-confidence and that she learned "lyrical perseverance and manners" from Missy Elliott. She also cited inspiration from Erykah Badu, Billie Holiday, Joni Mitchell, The Beatles, Tori Amos, Rihanna, Migos, Cardi B, Tracy Chapman, Ai Weiwei, Sergei Rachmaninoff, Parris Goebel, Yeha Leung, and Rupi Kaur, described Madonna as her "eternal muse", and praised Marina Abramović for "dar[ing] to perform even when others call[ed] her crazy".

"I’m proud to be sensual – and when you consider the things men sing or rap about! And I’m proud to not be a size zero. Freedom through my body and movement isn’t to impress, it’s to help anyone who has a little something something different than someone else, to feel accepted."

— Legzdina talking to Haste Magazine

Journalists usually mention that Legzdina's works are sex-positive and body-positive; in a 2022 interview with Haste Magazine, she noted that she was proud that her works were "sensual" on the grounds that it was important to see real bodies like her own represented. She also attributed opinions of her work to the "horrification of the female body", and questioned whether she would be considered "as racy" if she "was a six foot model" or "had smaller breasts". In an interview with Tirade.world, she mentioned that she had suffered from a series of sexual traumas when she was a teenager and that projecting her body in sexual ways helped her to reclaim it. By July 2024, she had joined Loud LDN, a collective of London-based women and genderqueer musicians founded in May 2022.

== Discography ==
=== EPs ===
- Iron Curtain Golden Pussy (2020)
- Nocturnes (Eliza Legzdina, Ant Lavelle, Nocturnes, Kieran, HTCHR, 2022)
- Silver Linings (2022)

=== Singles ===
- "Red" (Eliza Legzdina, Hurricane, 2019)
- "Holsten Chills" (Ant Lavelle, Ghilburt, Eliza Legzdina, 2019)
- "Tom & Jerry" (2020)
- "Jelly" (Eliza Legzdina, Bryte, 2020)
- "Slow" (Tay Jordan, Eliza Legzdina, 2020)
- "Money" (Halal Dog, Bryte, Eliza Legzdina, 2020)
- "Curse 4 U" (2020)
- "Wicked" (Lau.ra, Eliza Legzdina, 2020)
- "Enjoy the Silence" (Eliza Legzdina, HTCHR, 2021)
- "Hot Sauce" (2021)
- "Eat Your Greenz" (2021)
- "Fudge" (Idris Elba, Eliza Legzdina, 2021)
- "Rose Tinted" (Crate Classics, Eliza Legzdina, 2021)
- "Hardcore" (Eliza Legzdina, Slatin, 2021)
- "Backflip" (2021)
- "Do Your Thing" (Miqui Brightside, Eliza Legzdina, 2021)
- "Up" (Yiigga, Lucy Tun, Eliza Legzdina, 2021)
- "Blow" (Lau.ra, Eliza Legzdina, 2022)
- "Antidote" (Eliza Legzdina, Ant Lavelle, Nocturnes, Kieran, HTCHR, 2022)
- "Moody" (Mauriks, Eliza Legzdina, 2022)
- "Kerching" (Joshwa, Jaded, Eliza Legzdina, 2022)
- "Leader of the Pack" (Eliza Legzdina, Ruckspin, 2022)
- "Yum!" (Eliza Legzdina, Ruckspin, 2022)
- "Bam Bam" (Rolands Če, Eliza Legzdina, 2023)
- "Sway" (Schlachthofbronx, Eliza Legzdina, 2023)
- "U Be U" (Manga Saint Hilaire, MoreNight, Eliza Legzdina, 2023)
- "Let Love Lead the Way" (Mason, Eliza Legzdina, 2023)
- "The Back" (KingCrowney, Jimpster, Legzdina, 2024)
- "Come Roll With Me" (2024)
- "Pressure" (Sara Landry, Legzdina, 2024)
- "Bitter Truth" (2024)
- "Metropolis" (Lyam, Legzdina, 2024)
- "Icing on the Cake" (2024)
- "Ribbon" (2026)

=== Charted singles ===
List of charted singles, with year, album and chart positions
Title	Year	Peak chart positions			Album
Title	Year	LAT Dom. Air.	LAT Stream.	LAT Dom. Stream.	Album
"The Water" (with Bel Tempo)	2024	5	3	1	Non-album single

=== Other appearances ===
- "Runnin" (Eliza Legzdina, Slxm, from the Run to the Source soundtrack, 2022)
- "DeepBluSea" (Bel Tempo, Eliza Legzdina, from Pessimismus, 2022)
