= Latvia in the Eurovision Song Contest 2026 =

- Eurovision Song Contest 2026
- Participating broadcaster: Latvian Public Service Media (LSM)
- Country: Latvia
- Selection process: Supernova 2026
- Selection date: 14 February 2026

Competing entry
- Song: "Ēnā"
- Artist: Atvara
- Songwriters: Jānis Jačmenkins; Liene Stūrmane

Placement
- Semi-final result: Failed to qualify (13th)

Participation chronology

Latvia was represented at the Eurovision Song Contest 2026 by the song "Ēnā", written by Jānis Jačmenkins and Liene Stūrmane, and performed by Stūrmane herself under her stage name Atvara. The Latvian participating broadcaster, Latvian Public Service Media (LSM), organised the national final Supernova 2026 in order to select its entry for the contest.

== Background ==
Prior to the 2026 contest, Latvijas Televīzija (LTV) until 2024, and Latvian Public Service Media (LSM) since 2025, had participated in the Eurovision Song Contest representing Latvia 25 times since its first entry in 2000. It won the contest once in 2002 with the song "I Wanna" performed by Marie N. Following the introduction of semi-finals in 2004, it was able to qualify for the final between 2005 and 2008. Between 2009 and 2014, it failed to qualify to the final for six consecutive years before managing to qualify to the final in 2015 and 2016. Having once again failed to qualify to the final for six consecutive contests between 2017 and 2023, it managed to qualify to the final in 2024 with the song "Hollow" performed by Dons, placing 16th with a score of 64 points, and once again in 2025 with the song "Bur man laimi" performed by Tautumeitas, placing 13th with a score of 158 points.

As part of its duties as participating broadcaster, LSM organises the selection of its entry in the Eurovision Song Contest and broadcasts the event in the country. The broadcaster confirmed their intentions to participate at the 2026 contest on 1 August 2025. Since their debut in 2000 until 2012, LTV had organised the selection show Eirodziesma, which was rebranded and retooled as Dziesma in 2013 and 2014. Since 2015, LTV and LSM have organised the Supernova national final in order to select its entry. Along with its participation confirmation, the broadcaster announced that it would again organise Supernova in order to select its entry for 2026.

== Before Eurovision ==
=== Supernova 2026 ===
Supernova 2026 was the eleventh edition of the national final format used to select Latvia's entry for the Eurovision Song Contest. The competition commenced on 31 January 2026 and concluded with a final on 14 February 2026. All shows took place at the Riga Film Studio in Riga, and were hosted by Ketija Šēnberga, Lauris Reiniks and Māra Sleja. The competition was broadcast on LTV1, online via the streaming platform Replay.lv, the broadcaster's official website lsm.lv, and via radio on Latvijas Radio 5 with commentary by Mārtiņš Pabērzis.

==== Format ====
The format of the competition consisted of three shows: two semi-finals and a final. The two semi-finals, held on 31 January and 7 February 2026, each featured twelve competing entries from which the top five advanced to the final. The final, held on 14 February 2026, selected the Latvian entry for Vienna from the remaining ten entries. Results during the semi-final and final shows will be determined by the 50/50 combination of votes from a jury panel and a public vote. Viewers will be able to vote via SMS and online through the official LSM website.

The jury voted in each show and selected entries to advance in the competition. The panel consisted of:

- Kārlis Kazāks – musician and songwriter, director of Latvijas Radio 5
- Liena Edvardsa – CEO of LaIPA and music industry expert
- Linda Āboliņa – music industry expert and artist manager
- Guna Zučika – music industry expert and artist manager
- Laura Jēkabsone – singer, composer, music educator and conductor
- Edgars Bāliņš – media and music industry expert
- Peter Åstedt – Swedish music industry expert
- Marlon Burton – Agent at British music agency ATC Live
- Toomas Olljum – CEO of Estonian record label Made in Baltics
- Reelika Lelle – Head of Marketing at Sony Music Baltics
- Vaidas Stackevičius – CEO of Lithuanian music agency M.P.3
- Rimvydas Cerniauskas – Lithuanian television and radio personality

==== Competing entries ====
On 1 August 2025, LSM opened a song submission window for artists to apply, with the deadline set for 1 October 2025. Performers were required to be Latvian nationals or permanent residents of Latvia, while songwriters and producers could be from any country. Additionally, a songwriting camp was held in Riga between 25 and 28 August 2025 in order to create songs to be submitted for the competition. At the end of the submission period, 124 entries had been received. The twenty-four competing artists and songs were selected by a jury composed of representatives of the Latvian music, event and television industry, as well as foreign professionals, and were announced on 20 November 2025 on the programme Rīta Panorāma, broadcast on LTV1.

Among the selected competing artists are Robert Ox, who represented Latvia in 2022 as a member of Citi Zēni, and Amanda Bašmakova, who represented Latvia in Junior Eurovision 2011 as a member of Elpo.

Artist	Song	Songwriter(s)
Agnesse	"Oh My My"	Agnese Stengrevics; Gilbert Gauci; Jacob Markman
Aivo Oskis	"Walking Out"	Aivo Oskis; Teemu Javanainen
Antra Stafecka	"Divejāda"	Antra Stafecka; Ingars Viļums
Atvara	"Ēnā"	Jānis Jačmenkins; Liene Stūrmane
Blurie	"Lovin' Always Gets Me Down"	Renārs Dagilis
Daba	"Panic Attack"	Deniels Bērziņš; Santa Paula Mata; Tomasz Kamiński
De Mantra	"Let Them"	Liene Leitāne; Madara Martinkena
Edvards Strazdiņš	"I Ain't Got the Guts"	Edvards Strazdiņš
Elpo	"Blakus"	Amanda Bašmakova; Mārtiņš Makreckis
Emilija	"All We Ever Had"	Emilija Bērziņa; Povel Olsson
Honey Blue	"Blue Disco"	Andrejs Ļevskojs; Antons Kulagins; Dominiks Levuškāns; Karīna Aurora Paņina; Santa Paula Mata
Ivo Grīsniņš Grīslis	"Home"	Ivo Grīsniņš Grīslis
Jānis Rugājs	"Smoke"	Elad Lahmany; Kjersti Sleveland; Jānis Rugājs
Kautkaili	"Te un tagad"	Didzis Bardovskis; Kristīne Pāže; Krists Krūskops
Kristīne Megija	"Insanity"	Daina Laima
Krisy	"Take It"	Andis Ansons; Ben Pyne; Kristiāna Skrudupa
Legzdina	"Ribbon"	Ben Dunkerley; Elīza Legzdiņa
Miks Galvanovskis	"Cruel Angel"	Lance Vought; Miks Galvanovskis; Ričards Bulavs
Nolark	"Different Places"	Kārlis Daudziņš; Matīss Daudziņš; Ralfs Plešs
Papīra lidmašīnas	"You're My Saviour"	Juris Ludženieks; Rihards Bērziņš
Paula	"Dejot vien"	Paula Dundere; Jēkabs Kalmanis
Robert Ox	"Ravin' at the Taj Mahal"	Emma Gale; Maria Malmström; Roberts Memmēns
Tikasha Sakama	"#010126 Coda"	Nansija Garkalne
Vēstnieks	"Vai tas ir kāds brīnums?"	Rūdolfs Macats

==== Semi-finals ====
The semi-finals took place on 31 January and 7 February 2026. In each semi-final, twelve acts competed and the top five entries qualified to the final based on the combination of votes from a jury panel and the Latvian public.

Semi-final 1 – 31 January 2026
R/O	Artist	Song	Result
1	Antra Stafecka	"Divejāda"	Eliminated
2	Tikasha Sakama	"#010126 Coda"	Advanced
3	Elpo	"Blakus"	Advanced
4	Agnesse	"Oh My My"	Eliminated
5	Emilija	"All We Ever Had"	Advanced
6	Blurie	"Lovin' Always Gets Me Down"	Eliminated
7	Aivo Oskis	"Walking Out"	Eliminated
8	Daba	"Panic Attack"	Eliminated
9	Kautkaili	"Te un tagad"	Advanced
10	De Mantra	"Let Them"	Advanced
11	Honey Blue	"Blue Disco"	Eliminated
12	Ivo Grīsniņš Grīslis	"Home"	Eliminated

Semi-final 2 – 7 February 2026
R/O	Artist	Song	Result
1	Jānis Rugājs	"Smoke"	Eliminated
2	Paula	"Dejot vien"	Eliminated
3	Edvards Strazdiņš	"I Ain't Got the Guts"	Eliminated
4	Kristīne Megija	"Insanity"	Eliminated
5	Nolark	"Different Places"	Eliminated
6	Miks Galvanovskis	"Cruel Angel"	Advanced
7	Legzdina	"Ribbon"	Advanced
8	Papīra lidmašīnas	"You're My Saviour"	Eliminated
9	Atvara	"Ēnā"	Advanced
10	Krisy	"Take It"	Advanced
11	Vēstnieks	"Vai tas ir kāds brīnums?"	Eliminated
12	Robert Ox	"Ravin' at the Taj Mahal"	Advanced

==== Final ====
The final took place on 14 February 2026 where the ten entries that qualified from the semi-final competed. The song with the highest number of votes based on the combination of votes from a jury panel and the public, "Ēnā" by Atvara, was declared the winner. In addition to the competing entries, guest performers included 2023 Latvian entrants Sudden Lights and Estonian singer Noëp.

Final – 14 February 2026
R/O	Artist	Song	Jury rank	Public vote		Place
R/O	Artist	Song	Jury rank	Percentage	Rank	Place
1	De Mantra	"Let Them"	10	3.35%	6	8
2	Elpo	"Blakus"	6	2.32%	8	7
3	Krisy	"Take It"	8	1.86%	10	10
4	Kautkaili	"Te un tagad"	2	26.84%	2	2
5	Legzdina	"Ribbon"	9	2.12%	9	9
6	Emilija	"All We Ever Had"	3	14.93%	3	3
7	Atvara	"Ēnā"	1	27.67%	1	1
8	Robert Ox	"Ravin' at the Taj Mahal"	4	9.42%	4	4
9	Tikasha Sakama	"#010126 Coda"	5	2.84%	7	6
10	Miks Galvanovskis	"Cruel Angel"	7	8.65%	5	5

==== Ratings ====
Viewing figures by show
Show	Air date	Viewership	Avg. rating (%)
Semi-final 1	31 January 2026	153,200	9.5%
Semi-final 2	7 February 2026	124,900	7.7%
Final	14 February 2026	157,700	9.8%

== At Eurovision ==
The Eurovision Song Contest 2026 took place at the Wiener Stadthalle in Vienna, Austria, and consisted of two semi-finals held on the respective dates of 12 and 14 May and the final on 16 May 2026. All nations with the exceptions of the host country and the "Big Four" (France, Germany, Italy and the United Kingdom) were required to qualify from one of two semi-finals in order to compete for the final; the top ten countries from each semi-final progressed to the final. On 12 January 2026, an allocation draw was held to determine which of the two semi-finals, as well as which half of the show, each country performed in; the European Broadcasting Union (EBU) split up the competing countries into different pots based on voting patterns from previous contests, with countries with favourable voting histories put into the same pot. Latvia was scheduled for the second half of the second semi-final.

=== Voting ===
==== Points awarded to Latvia ====
Points awarded to Latvia (Semi-final 2)
Score	Televote	Jury
12 points		
10 points		
8 points		
7 points		
6 points		Switzerland
5 points	United Kingdom	Czechia
4 points		Denmark; Romania
3 points	France; Luxembourg; Norway	Azerbaijan; Ukraine; United Kingdom
2 points	Rest of the World	
1 point	Albania; Armenia; Azerbaijan; Malta; Switzerland	

==== Points awarded by Latvia ====
Points awarded by Latvia (Semi-final 2)
Score	Televote	Jury
12 points	Ukraine	Czechia
10 points	Norway	Denmark
8 points	Romania	Luxembourg
7 points	Switzerland	Ukraine
6 points	Bulgaria	Norway
5 points	Denmark	Bulgaria
4 points	Luxembourg	Romania
3 points	Malta	Australia
2 points	Australia	Switzerland
1 point	Albania	Armenia

Points awarded by Latvia (Final)
Score	Televote	Jury
12 points	Lithuania	Czechia
10 points	Finland	Belgium
8 points	Moldova	Poland
7 points	Bulgaria	Ukraine
6 points	Romania	France
5 points	Ukraine	Denmark
4 points	Israel	Bulgaria
3 points	Denmark	Finland
2 points	Greece	Romania
1 point	Italy	Greece

==== Detailed voting results ====
Each participating broadcaster assembles a seven-member jury panel consisting of music industry professionals who are citizens of the country they represent and two of which have to be between 18 and 25 years old. Each jury, and individual jury member, is required to meet a strict set of criteria regarding professional background, as well as diversity in gender and age. No member of a national jury was permitted to be related in any way to any of the competing acts in such a way that they cannot vote impartially and independently. The individual rankings of each jury member as well as the nation's televoting results were released shortly after the grand final.

The following members comprised the Latvian jury:

- Artūrs Analts
- Juris Kaukulis
- Krists Indrišonoks
- Kārlis Matīss Zitmanis
- Ieva Rozentāle
- Linda Āboliņa
- Paula Saija

Detailed voting results from Latvia (Semi-final 2)
R/O	Country	Jury									Televote	
R/O	Country	Juror A	Juror B	Juror C	Juror D	Juror E	Juror F	Juror G	Rank	Points	Rank	Points
01	Bulgaria	7	11	3	7	5	13	2	6	5	5	6
02	Azerbaijan	14	14	14	14	14	14	13	14		14	
03	Romania	13	5	12	1	13	3	7	7	4	3	8
04	Luxembourg	4	7	2	3	2	5	14	3	8	7	4
05	Czechia	6	9	1	5	1	1	1	1	12	11	
06	Armenia	10	10	5	9	4	9	8	10	1	13	
07	Switzerland	12	8	7	2	11	7	4	9	2	4	7
08	Cyprus	11	12	6	13	10	11	12	13		12	
09	Latvia											
10	Denmark	3	1	4	8	9	2	5	2	10	6	5
11	Australia	5	2	9	10	6	4	11	8	3	9	2
12	Ukraine	1	3	10	6	3	8	6	4	7	1	12
13	Albania	9	13	8	11	7	12	9	11		10	1
14	Malta	8	6	13	12	12	10	10	12		8	3
15	Norway	2	4	11	4	8	6	3	5	6	2	10

Detailed voting results from Latvia (Final)
R/O	Country	Jury									Televote	
R/O	Country	Juror A	Juror B	Juror C	Juror D	Juror E	Juror F	Juror G	Rank	Points	Rank	Points
01	Denmark	17	5	10	5	6	14	3	6	5	8	3
02	Germany	23	25	24	21	24	21	21	25		25	
03	Israel	19	13	15	19	12	12	19	20		7	4
04	Belgium	1	4	2	2	5	8	4	2	10	24	
05	Albania	21	21	20	20	23	17	25	24		17	
06	Greece	12	15	3	8	17	22	8	10	1	9	2
07	Ukraine	7	1	6	9	8	4	5	4	7	6	5
08	Australia	24	8	14	7	18	15	10	16		14	
09	Serbia	8	19	23	25	7	23	12	18		12	
10	Malta	14	10	18	16	15	16	16	19		15	
11	Czechia	4	7	1	1	1	1	9	1	12	19	
12	Bulgaria	10	6	4	4	13	5	17	7	4	4	7
13	Croatia	15	18	21	23	20	13	18	21		20	
14	United Kingdom	20	20	16	22	25	25	1	15		21	
15	France	13	2	9	11	3	2	14	5	6	11	
16	Moldova	5	16	7	17	19	6	22	13		3	8
17	Finland	18	9	12	10	14	19	2	8	3	2	10
18	Poland	2	3	8	3	2	3	15	3	8	18	
19	Lithuania	11	14	5	13	11	7	13	12		1	12
20	Sweden	16	17	11	6	16	11	7	14		16	
21	Cyprus	25	22	19	12	22	20	23	22		22	
22	Italy	22	24	17	15	21	24	20	23		10	1
23	Norway	6	11	22	18	9	9	6	11		13	
24	Romania	3	23	25	24	4	18	11	9	2	5	6
25	Austria	9	12	13	14	10	10	24	17		23	
