= JJ (singer) =

Austrian-Filipino singer (born 2001)

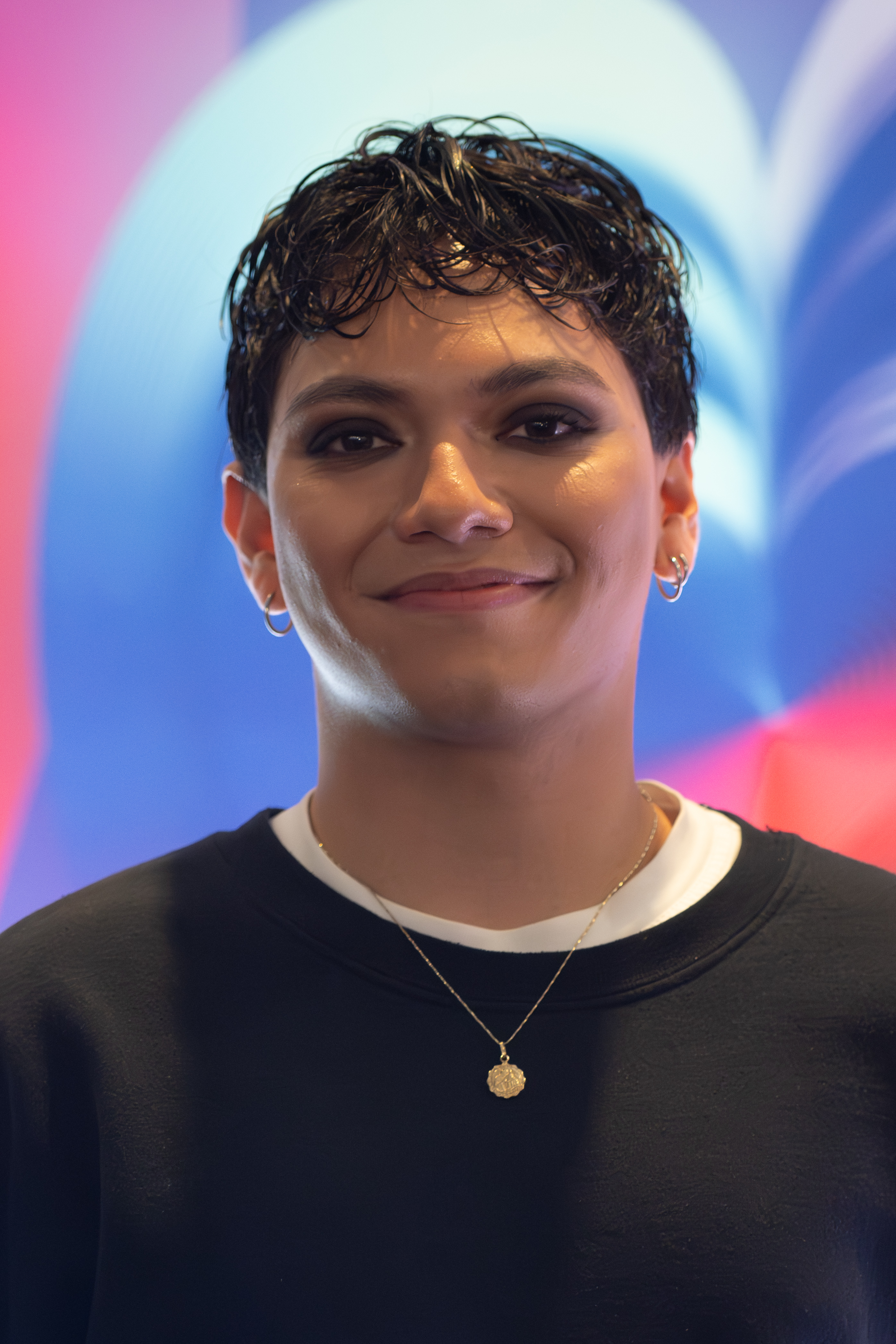
- JJ in 2026

Background information
- Born: Johannes Pietsch; 29 April 2001 (age 25); Vienna, Austria
- Genres: Pop; opera
- Occupations: Singer; songwriter
- Instrument: Vocals
- Years active: 2020–present
- Label: Manifester

Johannes Pietsch (German pronunciation: [joˈhanəs ˈpiːtʃ]; born 29 April 2001), also known by his stage name JJ, is an Austrian singer. He won the Eurovision Song Contest 2025 for Austria with the song "Wasted Love".

== Early life ==
Pietsch was born on 29 April 2001 in Vienna to an Austrian father and a Filipino mother. He spent the majority of his childhood in Dubai, United Arab Emirates, where he was introduced to both pop through karaoke parties with his family and opera through his father. Both have influenced his current pop-opera style. In 2016, the family moved back to Vienna.

== Musical career ==
In 2020, Pietsch took part in the ninth series of The Voice UK after missing the deadline for The Voice of Germany. He advanced to the Knockouts with the help of his coach will.i.am. The following year, he took part in the fifth season of Starmania, where he made it to the first final show. He attends the Music and Arts University of the City of Vienna after having attended the opera school of the Vienna State Opera.

On 30 January 2025, "Wasted Love" performed by Pietsch, under the stage name JJ, was announced by ORF as the Austrian entry for the Eurovision Song Contest 2025 during the radio show Ö3-Wecker, aired on Ö3. "Wasted Love" was co-written by JJ, Austrian 2023 representative Teodora Špirić and music producer Thomas Thurner, and was released on 6 March 2025. He won in the grand final on 17 May, after receiving a total of 436 points. He won the jury vote with 258 points and received 178 points in the televote. He became the first Eurovision winner of Southeast Asian descent as well as the first solo Eurovision winner born in the 2000s and the 21st century.

In December 2025, JJ won two fan-voted Eurovision Awards in the categories Outstanding Vocals and #ALBM Cover of the Year for his and Conchita Wurst's mashup of their Eurovision entries, "Rise Like a Phoenix" and "Wasted Love".

== Musical style ==
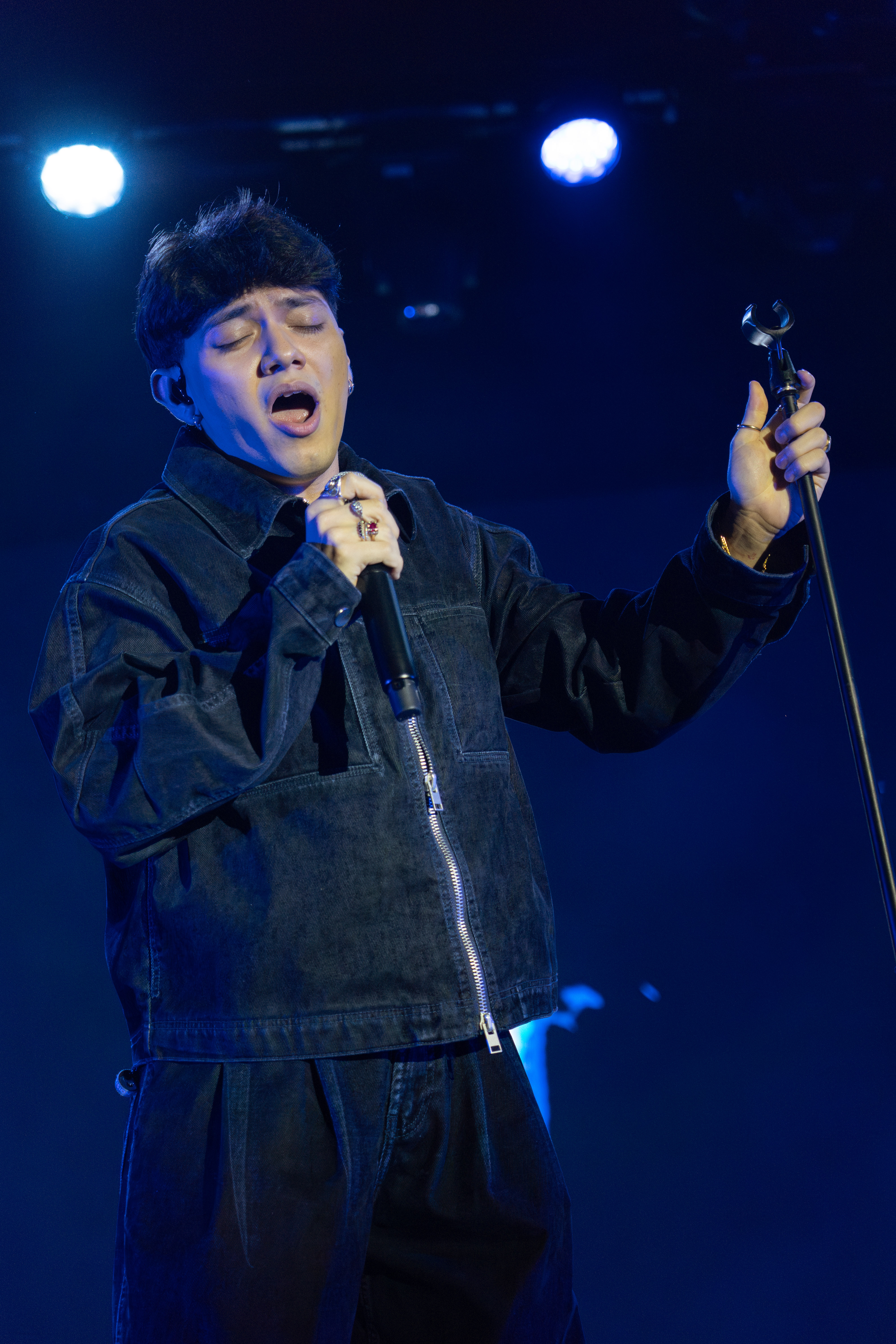
Pietsch performs in Madrid during PreParty Spain 2025

Pietsch's musical style combines elements of opera and pop. As a sopranist ("soprano" type of countertenor) with a range reaching into high soprano heights, he explores both genres through an intense and expressive vocal and interpretative approach.

== Personal life ==
Pietsch speaks German, English and Tagalog. Pietsch At a press conference following his Eurovision victory, he stated that he has a boyfriend.

After the competition, Pietsch expressed "disappointment" over Israel's participation in the event and stated in an interview with El País, "I would like Eurovision to be held in Vienna next year but without Israel. But the ball is in the EBU's court. We, the artists, can only raise our voices on the matter."

== Discography ==
=== EPs ===
Title	Details
Into the Unknown	Release date: 14 May 2026; Label: Manifester Music, Warner Germany; Format: Digital download, streaming

=== Singles ===
Title	Year	Peak chart positions										Certifications	Album or EP
Title	Year	AUT	FIN	GER	IRE	LTU	NLD	NOR	SWE	UK	WW	Certifications	Album or EP
"Wasted Love"	2025	1	10	13	53	5	36	27	8	53	167	IFPI AUT: Gold	Into the Unknown
"Back to Forgetting"	2025	61	—	—	—	—	—	—	—	—	—		Into the Unknown
"Haunting Me"	2025	—	—	—	—	—	—	—	—	—	—		Into the Unknown
"Shapeshifter"	2026	— (Note: "Shapeshifter" did not reach the Ö3 Austria Top 40, but peaked at number 49 at the Austrian airplay chart.)	—	—	—	—	—	—	—	—	—		Into the Unknown
"Ballerina"	2026	—	—	—	—	—	—	—	—	—	—		Into the Unknown
"Unknown"	2026	—	—	—	—	—	—	—	—	—	—		Into the Unknown
"Not Afraid"	2026	—	—	—	—	—	—	—	—	—	—		TBA
"Sweetest Salvation"	2026	—	—	—	—	—	—	—	—	—	—		TBA
"—" denotes a recording that did not chart or was not released in that territory.

== Awards and nominations ==
Year	Award	Category	Nominee(s)	Result	Ref.
2025	Eurovision Awards	Outstanding Vocals	Himself	Won	
2025	Eurovision Awards	#ALBM Cover of the Year	Himself and Conchita Wurst for "Rise Like a Phoenix x Wasted Love (Mashup)"	Won	
2026	Amadeus Austrian Music Awards	Ö3 Song of the Year	"Wasted Love"	Nominated	

== Tour ==
Promotional

- Act I: The Introduction (2026)
- Act II: Into The Unknown Tour (2026)

== See also ==
- List of Austrian musicians

== Notes ==
Awards and achievements
Preceded by Kaleen with "We Will Rave"	Austria in the Eurovision Song Contest; 2025	Succeeded by Cosmó with "Tanzschein"
Preceded by (Switzerland) Nemo with "The Code"	Winner of the Eurovision Song Contest; 2025	Succeeded by (Bulgaria) Dara with "Bangaranga"
