= Auļi =

Latvian band

Background information
- Origin: Latvia
- Genres: Folk music, world music
- Years active: 2003–present
- Labels: Lauska
- Members: Kaspars Bārbals; Leanne Barbo; Gatis Valters; Māris Jēkabsons; Edgars Kārklis; Normunds Vaivads; Gatis Indrēvics; Mikus Čavarts; Edgars Krūmiņš; Kaspars Indrēvics
- Website: auli.lv/en

Auļi is a Latvian folk/world music band formed in 2003. The band consists of 6 bagpipers, 3 drummers and 1 electric cello player. The band also uses the Jew's harp and the shawm, an ancestor of the oboe, in their music.

== History ==
In 2005, Auļi released their 12-track debut album Sendzirdēju. In 2010, the band released their third studio album titled Etnotranss (Ethno trance), a term they created to describe their music. The album features Andris Grunte on double bass.

On May 4, 2013, Auļi performed a 10-year anniversary concert at Palladium Riga. The same month the band released a best of album Dižducis with 12 of their previously released compositions, re-arranged by multi-instrumentalist Kārlis Auzāns and joined by Juris Kaukulis from Dzelzs Vilks, folk singer Zane Šmite, Madagascarian musician Kilema (vocals and valiha) and other guest musicians.

In 2016, Auļi released their fifth studio album Gadalokos with compositions about the Latvian seasons (Sala laiks, Sērsnu laiks, Pavasara laiks, Ziedu laiks, Siena laiks, Rudens laiks, Veļu laiks and Ledus laiks) and celebrations (Meteņi, Lieldienas, Ūsiņi, Jāņi, Māras, Apjumības, Mārtiņi, Ziemassvētki and Pieguļa). The album was inspired by a calendar pendant found in a 1999–2000 archaeological excavation in Tukums.

In 2017, Auļi together with Tautumeitas released a 13-track album Lai māsiņa rotājās! dedicated to engagements and weddings. The album received Annual Latvian Music Recording Award as the Best Folk music album of 2017. Lai māsiņa rotājās! also reached position No. 26 in the 2018 World Music Charts Europe, as well as No. 38 in the April 2018 and May 2018 Transglobal World Music Chart.

In 2019, Auļi released a 12 song album Senĉu Balsis: Voices of the Ancestors featuring four guest musicians (Batzorig Vaanchig, Albin Paulus, Kai Somby, and Edgars Lipors) each representing a distinctive singing style (Tuvan throat singing, yodeling, joiking, and traditional Latvian singing). Two months after the release of the studio album Auļi released a live concert recording of this album called Voices of the Ancestors (Live at GORS, Rēzekne, 2019).

In 2020, Auļi released a COVID-19 inspired remote performance single alongside many other drummers and bagpipe players called Alšvangas dūdu meldiņš. This performance was released 10 May 2020 amidst the COVID-19 pandemic.

In 2021, Auļi released a 12-composition instrumental album Visapkārt ("Immersive") using Dolby Atmos surround sound technology.

== Members ==
- Kaspars Bārbals — dūdas, pipe, bombard and drums
- Leanne Barbo — torupill and jew's harp
- Gatis Valters — ģīga and drums
- Māris Jēkabsons — dūdas and vocals
- Edgars Kārklis — dūdas
- Normunds Vaivads — dūdas
- Gatis Indrēvics — dūdas and bombard
- Mikus Čavarts — percussion instruments
- Edgars Krūmiņš — drums
- Kaspars Indrēvics — tree trunk drums

== Discography ==
- Sendzirdēju (2005)
- Auļos... (2007)
- Etnotranss (2010)
- Dižducis (2013)
- Gadalokos (2016)
- Lai māsiņa rotājās! (2017; with Tautumeitas)
- Senču balsis (2019)
- Voices of the Ancestors (Live at GORS, Rēzekne, 2019)
- Visapkārt (2021)
