= Tautumeitas =

Latvian folk music group

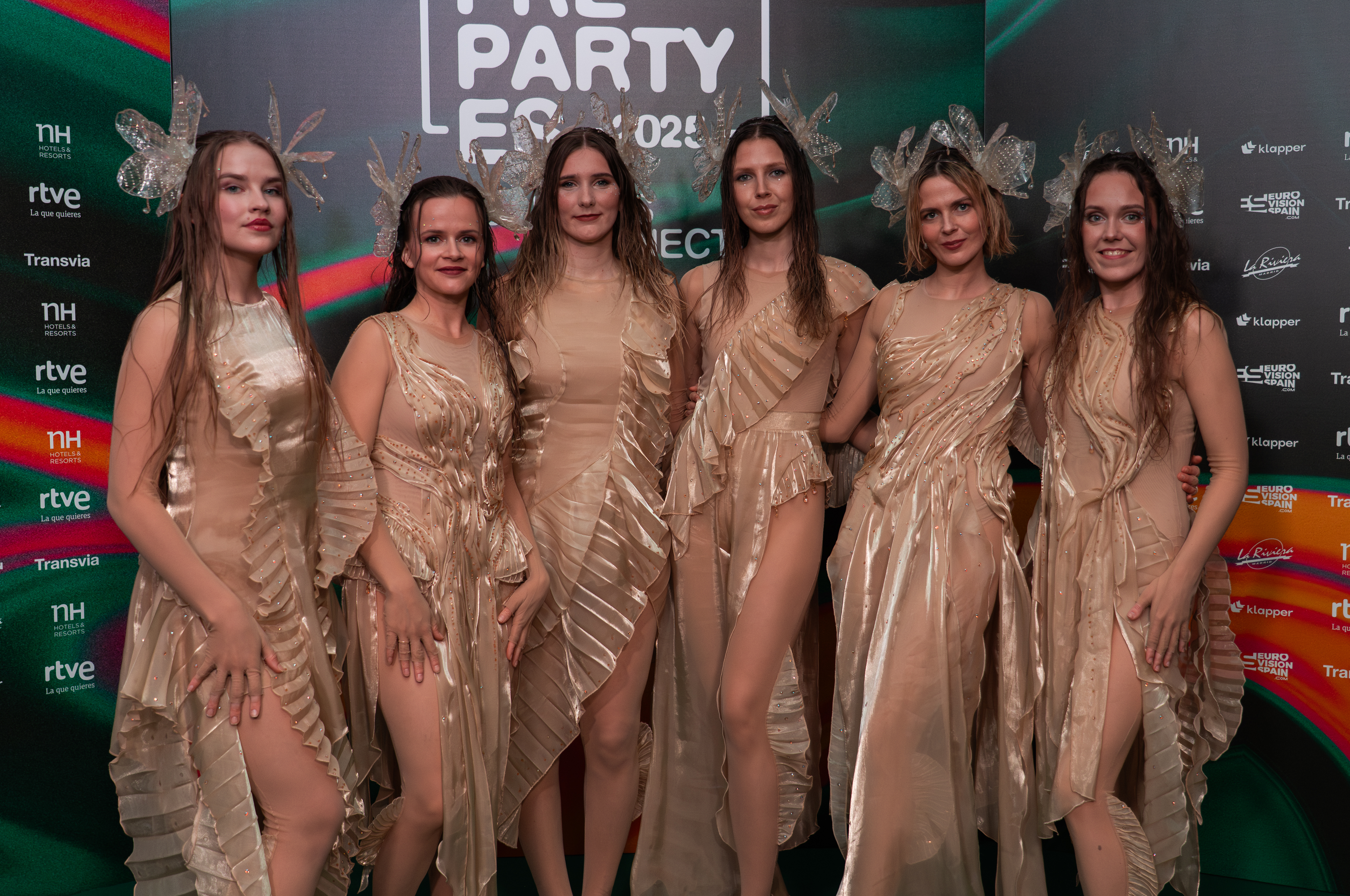
- Tautumeitas in 2025

Background information
- Origin: Riga, Latvia
- Genres: Folk music; world music
- Years active: 2015–present
- Labels: Lauska; ONAIR Studios
- Members: Asnate Rancāne; Aurēlija Rancāne; Annemarija Moiseja; Laura Marta Līcīte; Gabriēla Zvaigznīte; Kate Slišāne
- Past members: Laura Bužinska; Lauma Bērza; Ilona Dzērve; Laura Vārpiņa
- Website: tautumeitas.lv

Tautumeitas (pronounced [ˈtau̯tuˌmɛi̯tas]) are a Latvian folk/world music all-female band formed in 2015. The band consists of six vocalists and instrumentalists. They represented Latvia in the Eurovision Song Contest 2025 with the song "Bur man laimi".

== History ==
In 2017 Tautumeitas, together with Auļi released a 13-track album 'Lai māsiņa rotājās!' dedicated to engagements and weddings, and it draws on Baltic folk musical traditions. The album received Annual Latvian Music Recording Award as the Best Folk music album of 2017. Lai māsiņa rotājās! also reached position No. 26 in the 2018 World Music Charts Europe, as well as No. 38 in the April 2018 and May 2018 Transglobal World Music Chart. In 2018 Tautumeitas released their self-titled debut album.

On 2 June 2021, Tautumeitas announced on their official Instagram account that Lauma Bērza would leave the group in the summer.

On 20 November 2024, it was announced that Tautumeitas was selected as a semi-finalist in Supernova 2025 with the song "Bur man laimi". The show is used to determine Latvia's representative for the Eurovision Song Contest. On 8 February 2025, Tautumeitas won Supernova 2025 with their song "Bur man laimi", earning the right to represent Latvia in the Eurovision Song Contest 2025, held in Switzerland. At Eurovision, they qualified through the semi-final and placed 13th in the final.

In the Eurovision Song Contest 2026, Aurēlija Rancāne from Tautumeitas announced the 12 points from Latvia.

== Members ==
=== Current members ===
- Asnate Rancāne – violin, vocals, flute
- Aurēlija Rancāne – drums, vocals
- Annemarija Moiseja – percussion, vocals
- Laura Marta Līcīte – percussion, violin, vocals
- Gabriēla Zvaigznīte - vocals
- Kate Slišāne - vocals, mandolin, clarinet, flute

=== Past members ===
- Ilona Dzērve — accordion, vocals
- Laura Liepiņa - vocals
- Lauma Bērza – violin, vocals
- Laura Bužinska

== Discography ==
- Lai māsiņa rotājās! (2017; with Auļi)
- Tautumeitas (2018)
- Dziesmas no Aulejas (2020)
- Skrejceļš (2022)
- Zem saules / Under the Solar Spell (2025)
- Līgojami (2026)

=== Charted singles ===
List of charted singles, with year, album and chart positions
Title	Year	Peak chart positions									Certifications	Album or EP
Title	Year	LAT Air.	LAT Dom. Air.	LAT Stream.	LAT Dom. Stream.	GRE Int.	LTU	SWI	UK Digital	UK Sales	Certifications	Album or EP
"Bur man laimi"	2024	2	1	4	1	70	12	97	33	34	LaIPA: 2× Platinum	Zem saules / Under the Solar Spell
"Mēs dancosim"	2026	24	2	—	—	—	—	—	—	—		Zem saules / Under the Solar Spell
"Līgojami"	2026	12	2	—	—	—	—	—	—	—		Līgojami
"—" denotes a recording that did not chart or was not released in that territory. "*" denotes that the chart did not exist at that time.

=== Other charted songs ===
List of other charted songs, with year, album and chart positions
Title	Year	Peak chart positions	Album or EP
Title	Year	LAT Dom. Stream.	Album or EP
"Gana" (Mesa featuring Tautumeitas)	2017	8	II

== Awards and nominations ==
Year	Award	Category	Nominee(s)	Result	Ref.
2025	Eurovision Awards	Artistic Vision	Themselves	Won	
2025	Eurovision Awards	Onstage Ensemble	Themselves	Won	

Awards and achievements
Preceded by Dons with "Hollow"	Latvia in the Eurovision Song Contest; 2025	Succeeded by Atvara with "Ēnā"
