= Atvara =

Latvian singer and songwriter

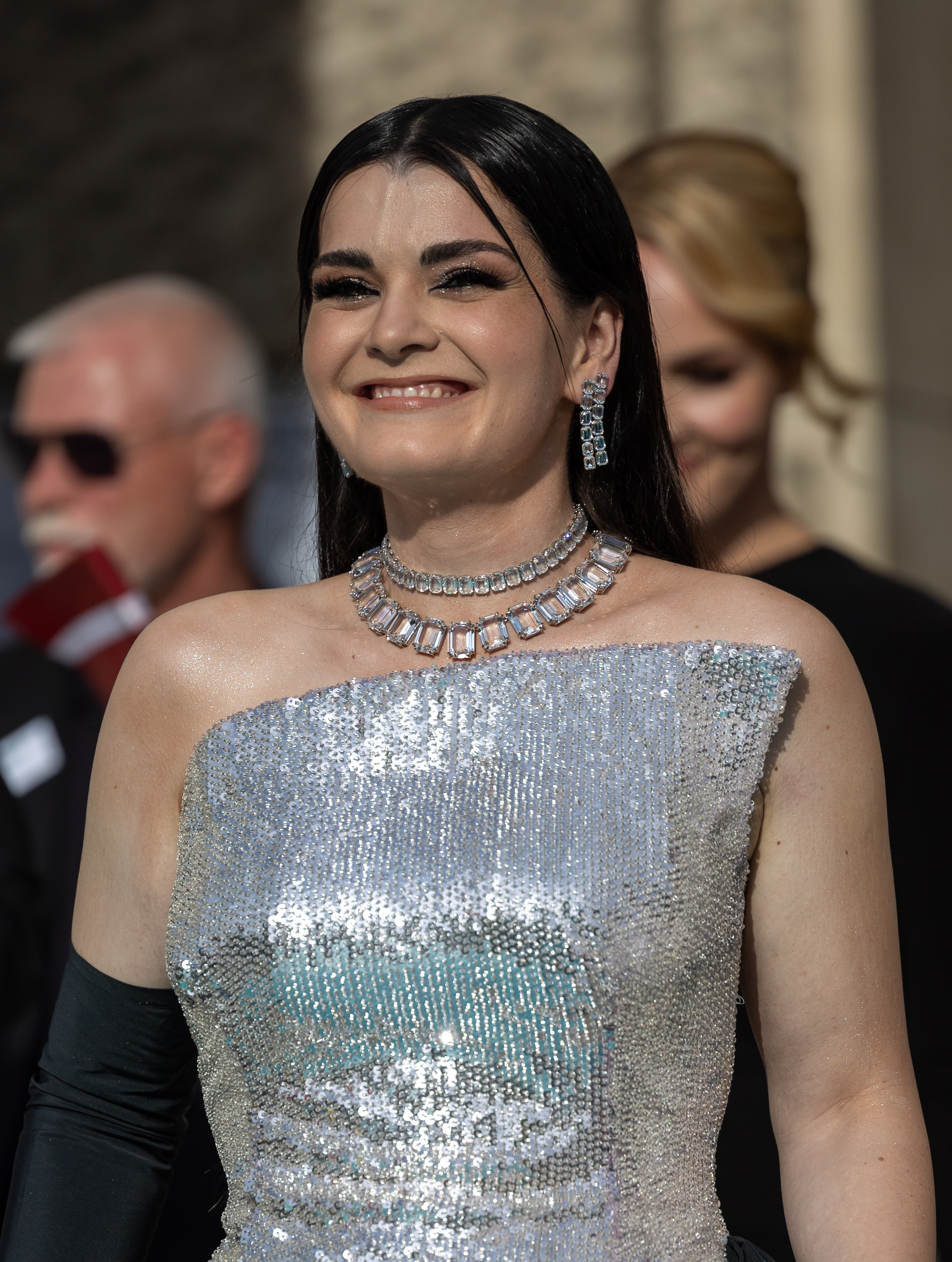
- Atvara in 2026

Background information
- Born: Liene Atvara Stūrmane; 2 April 1993 (age 33); Liepāja, Latvia
- Origin: Liepāja, Latvia
- Occupations: Singer; songwriter
- Label: Atvara Records

Liene Atvara Stūrmane (born 2 April 1993), known professionally as Atvara, is a Latvian singer and songwriter. She represented Latvia in the Eurovision Song Contest 2026 with the song "Ēnā", taking the 13th place in the second semi-final.

== Early life and education ==
Originally from Liepāja, Atvara showed a strong inclination towards singing from early childhood, which is why her mother decided to enroll her in a music school. She later attended the Emīls Melngailis Secondary School in her hometown, where she studied conducting, and then continued her education at the Jāzeps Mediņš Secondary School in Riga, graduating with a specialization in jazz and pop singing.

== Career ==
After completing her musical studies, Atvara became known on the small screen by participating, between 2012 and 2013, in some talent shows, such as Dziedošās ģimenes and Koru kari.

In 2017, Atvara took part in the first edition of X Faktors, the Latvian version of The X Factor, performing at the auditions with the songs One and Only by Adele and I Have Nothing by Whitney Houston. Despite receiving the judges' appreciation, she did not qualify for the next stages of the program.

After working for some time as an English teacher, in 2019, Atvara started her career in marketing at the same time and collaborating over the years with various companies in the digital content sector, including the Latvian radio station Star FM.

Atvara’s official debut as a solo singer took place in June 2024 with the single "Pie manis tveries", which debuted at number 9 on the Latvijas straumētāko singlu, exceeding 2 million views on TikTok and registering over a thousand uses in users' videos. The song was later also included in the Latvian television series Nelūgtie viesi.

In February 2025, Atvara collaborated with Intars Busulis on the song "Vai drīkst kāpt dziļāk", while the following month she made her debut as a presenter, alongside Mārtiņš Spuris in hosting the first edition of the GAMMA music awards.

During summer 2025, Atvara embarked on her first tour, with over 20 solo concerts across Latvia, which were sold out. Meanwhile, on 8 August she released the single "Dzīve mūs mētā", which received extensive radio rotation and was selected among the 15 finalist songs of the annual Muzikālā banka award, ranking tenth in the final ranking; the song was included in her debut studio album, Vol.1 Vai dzirdi, kā brūces dzīst.

On 20 November 2025, Atvara was confirmed among the artists participating in the 11th edition of Supernova, the Latvian selection for the Eurovision Song Contest, with the song Ēnā. After advancing to the semi-final, she won the national selection, and continued to represent Latvia in the Eurovision Song Contest 2026, Vienna, Austria.

Atvara represented Latvia in the Eurovision Song Contest 2026 on the 14th of May, with her song “Ēna”. She failed to qualify and gained the 13th place in the second semi-final.

== Discography ==
=== Studio albums ===
Title	Details
Vol.1 Vai dzirdi, kā brūces dzīst	Released: 28 October 2025; Label: Atvara Records; Formats: Digital download, streaming

=== Singles ===
==== As lead artist ====
List of singles, with year, album and chart positions
Title	Year	Peak chart positions				Album
Title	Year	LAT Air.	LAT Dom. Air.	LAT Stream.	LAT Dom. Stream.	Album
"Pie manis tveries"	2024	—	—	—	9	Vol.1 Vai dzirdi, kā brūces dzīst
"Ja kāds jautātu"	2024	—	—	—	—	Vol.1 Vai dzirdi, kā brūces dzīst
"Pieskāros"	2024	—	—	—	—	Vol.1 Vai dzirdi, kā brūces dzīst
"Vai drīkst kāpt dziļāk" (with Intars Busulis)	2025	—	—	—	—	Vol.1 Vai dzirdi, kā brūces dzīst
"Dzīve mūs mētā"	2025	—	—	—	13	Vol.1 Vai dzirdi, kā brūces dzīst
"Ēnā"	2025	13	1	1	1	Non-album singles
"Plaisā"	2026	—	6	—	—	Non-album singles
"Pa Rīgas ielām"	2026	—	—	—	—	Non-album singles
"—" denotes items which were not released in that country or failed to chart.

Awards and achievements
Preceded by Tautumeitas with "Bur man laimi"	Latvia in the Eurovision Song Contest; 2026	Succeeded by TBA
