= Ēnā =

2025 single by Atvara

Single by Atvara
- Language: Latvian
- English title: "In the shade"
- Released: 27 November 2025
- Length: 2:53
- Songwriters: Liene Stūrmane; Jānis Jačmenkins
- Producer: JJ Lush

Atvara singles chronology
"Dzīve mūs mētā" (2025)	"Ēnā" (2025)	"Plaisā" (2026)

Eurovision Song Contest 2026 entry
- Country: Latvia
- Artist: Atvara
- Language: Latvian
- Composers: Liene Stūrmane; Jānis Jačmenkins
- Lyricists: Liene Stūrmane; Jānis Jačmenkins

Finals performance
- Semi-final result: 13th
- Semi-final points: 49

Entry chronology
- ◄ "Bur man laimi" (2025)

"Ēnā" (Latvian: [ˈæːnaː]; transl. "In the shade") is a song by Latvian singer Atvara. It was written by Atvara alongside Jānis "JJ Lush" Jačmenkins, with production handled by Jačmenkins. The song was released on 27 November 2025 and represented Latvia in the Eurovision Song Contest 2026.

== Eurovision Song Contest 2026 ==
=== Supernova 2026 ===
Supernova 2026 was the eleventh edition of the national final format used to select Latvia's entry for the Eurovision Song Contest. The competition commenced on 31 January 2026 and concluded with a final on 14 February 2026. All shows took place at the Riga Film Studio in Riga. The competition was broadcast on LTV1, online via the streaming platform Replay.lv, the broadcaster's official website lsm.lv, and via radio on Latvijas Radio 5. The format of the competition consisted of three shows: two semi-finals and a final. The two semi-finals, held on 31 January and 7 February 2026, each featured twelve competing entries from which the top five advanced to the final. The final, held on 14 February 2026, selected the Latvian entry for Vienna from the remaining ten entries. Results during the semi-final and final shows were determined by the 50/50 combination of votes from a jury panel and a public vote. Viewers were able to vote via SMS and online through the official LSM website.

On 20 November 2025, Atvara was confirmed among the artists participating in the 11th edition of Supernova, the Latvian selection for the Eurovision Song Contest, with the song Ēnā. After advancing to the second semi-final, she won the final victory on 14 February 2026, thus acquiring the right to represent Latvia at the Eurovision Song Contest 2026 in Vienna, Austria.

=== At Eurovision ===
The Eurovision Song Contest 2026 took place at Wiener Stadthalle in Vienna, Austria, and consisted of two semi-finals, held on the respective dates of 12 and 14 May and the final on 16 May 2026. During the allocation draw held on 12 January 2026, Latvia was drawn to compete in the second semi-final, performing in the second half of the show. Ultimately, Ēnā failed to qualify to the Grand Final.

== Charts ==
=== Weekly charts ===
Weekly chart performance
Chart (2026)	Peak position
Latvia Airplay (LaIPA)	13
Latvia Domestic Airplay (LaIPA)	1
Latvia Streaming (LaIPA)	1
Latvia Domestic Streaming (LaIPA)	1

=== Monthly charts ===
Monthly chart performance
Chart (2026)	Peak position
Latvia Airplay (TopHit)	94
