= Jukedeck =

British company

- Company type: Private
- Founded: 2012 in London
- Founders: Ed Newton-Rex; Patrick Stobbs
- Industry: Synthetic media Algorithmic composition

Jukedeck was a British technology company founded in 2012. It built a website that let users create royalty-free music using artificial intelligence.

== History ==
Ed Newton-Rex started building the first version of Jukedeck’s algorithmic composition system in 2010, and founded the company in 2012. In 2014, Patrick Stobbs left Google to join as co-founder. Stobbs and Newton-Rex had met at the age of eight when they were both choristers in King's College Choir, and they had later been at Cambridge University together.

In 2015, Jukedeck launched a website that let people generate original, royalty-free music for use in videos. Users could set parameters including genre, instruments and duration, and specific climactic moments in the music; they could then generate a song in around 20 seconds that they could download for non-commercial or commercial use, with prices ranging from free for personal projects to $199 per song to purchase the copyright.

Newton-Rex’s original algorithmic composition program was a rule-based system in which note and chord probabilities were hard-coded. By 2017, this had been replaced with a two-tiered approach, in which artificial neural networks generated musical compositions which were converted to audio using an automated music production program. Music could be generated in a number of genres, from folk to electronica.

The website was used to create over 1 million pieces of music, and brands that used it included Coca-Cola, Google, UKTV, and the Natural History Museum, London. In 2018, Jukedeck’s technology was used to compose the music for K-pop girl group Spica for a performance at a concert at the Blue Square Concert Hall in Seoul. Singer Taryn Southern also used Jukedeck to create backing tracks for her songs.

Jukedeck grew to a team of 20 people and raised £2.5M in funding. In 2019, it was acquired by ByteDance, the parent company of TikTok, for an undisclosed sum.

== Awards ==
- Winner of Vator Splash London in 2013.
- Winner of the LeWeb startup competition in 2014.
- Winner of Pitch@Palace in 2015.
- Winner of the Startup Battlefield at TechCrunch Disrupt in 2015.
- Winner of an Innovation Lion at the Cannes Lions International Festival of Creativity in 2016.
- Winner of Hottest Media/Entertainment Startup at The Europas in 2017.
- Winner of Startup of the Year at the BIMA Awards in 2017.
