= Bur man laimi =

2024 single by Tautumeitas

Single by Tautumeitas

from the album Zem saules / Under the Solar Spell
- Language: Latvian
- English title: "Bring me happiness"
- Released: 4 December 2024
- Genre: Folk
- Length: 2:58
- Songwriters: Asnate Rancāne; Aurēlija Rancāne; Elvis Lintiņš; Laura Līcīte; Gabriēla Zvaigznīte
- Producer: Tautumeitas

Tautumeitas singles chronology
"Kas dimd" (2024)	"Bur man laimi" (2024)	"She Dances with the Sun" (2025)

Music video
- "Bur man laimi" on YouTube

Eurovision Song Contest 2025 entry
- Country: Latvia
- Artist: Tautumeitas
- Language: Latvian
- Composers: Asnate Rancāne; Aurēlija Rancāne; Elvis Lintiņš; Laura Līcīte
- Lyricists: Aurēlija Rancāne; Laura Līcīte; Asnate Rancāne; Gabriēla Zvaigznīte

Finals performance
- Semi-final result: 2nd
- Semi-final points: 130
- Final result: 13th
- Final points: 158

Entry chronology
- ◄ "Hollow" (2024)
- "Ēnā" (2026) ►

"Bur man laimi" (transl. "Bring me happiness") is a song by Latvian folk/world music girl group Tautumeitas. It was written by Asnate Rancāne, Aurēlija Rancāne, Elvis Lintiņš, Laura Līcīte, and Gabriēla Zvaigznīte, with production handled by Tautumeitas. The song was released on 4 December 2024 and represented Latvia in the Eurovision Song Contest 2025. It is the first song written entirely in Latvian to represent the country since 2004.

== Background and composition ==
"Bur man laimi" was written by Asnate Rancāne, Aurēlija Rancāne, Elvis Lintiņš, Laura Līcīte, and Gabriēla Zvaigznīte, and produced by Tautumeitas. According to the group, the lyrics contain Latvian proverbs that are supposed to bring good luck. The chorus contains a comparison between bridges built of oak and bridges made of steel. The group explained that steel bridges made by others will one day rust, while oak bridges will flourish and last. The meaning of these lines is that one should not communicate with strength and power, but with love and devotion to nature.

== Critical reception ==
In a Wiwibloggs review containing several reviews from several critics, the song was rated 6.37 out of 10 points, earning 19th out of the 37 songs competing in that year's Eurovision in the site's annual ranking that year. Jon O’Brien from Vulture ranked the song 1st out of 37, calling the song "this year’s most magical entry". Rob Picheta from CNN ranked the entry 15th out of the 26 finalists.

== Eurovision Song Contest 2025 ==
=== Supernova 2025 ===
Supernova 2025 was the tenth edition of the national final format used to select Latvia's entry for the Eurovision Song Contest. The competition commenced on 1 February 2025 with a semi-final and concluded with a final on 8 February 2025. The format of the competition consisted of two shows: a semi-final and a final. The semi-final, held on 1 February 2025, featured nineteen competing entries from which the top ten advanced to the final. A professional jury also had the opportunity to advance a wildcard act to the final from the remaining non-qualifying entries in the semi-final, but opted against doing so. Results during the semi-final and final shows were determined by the 50/50 combination of votes from a jury panel and a public vote, with both the jury and public vote assigning points from 1–8, 10 and 12 based on the number of competing songs in the respective show. Ties were decided in favour of the entries that received higher points from the public. Viewers were able to vote via telephone or via SMS.

On 20 November 2024, it was announced that Tautumeitas was selected as a semi-finalist in Supernova 2025 with the song "Bur man laimi." The song won the contest in the final. Therefore, they represented Latvia in Eurovision 2025.

=== At Eurovision ===
The Eurovision Song Contest 2025 took place at St. Jakobshalle in Basel, Switzerland, and consisted of two semi-finals held on the respective dates of 13 and 15 May and the final on 17 May 2025. During the allocation draw held on 28 January 2025, Latvia was drawn to compete in the second semi-final, performing in the first half of the show. Latvia qualified for the final - coming in runner-up. In the final, the song came 13th in final with 158 points.

== Track listing ==
Digital download/streaming

1. "Bur man laimi" – 2:58

Digital download/streaming – Acoustic version

1. "Bur man laimi (Acoustic)" – 3:25

== Charts ==
Chart performance for "Bur man laimi"
Chart (2025)	Peak position
Greece International (IFPI)	70
Latvia Airplay (LaIPA)	2
Latvia Domestic Airplay (LaIPA)	1
Latvia Streaming (LaIPA)	4
Latvia Domestic Streaming (LaIPA)	1
Lithuania (AGATA)	12
Switzerland (Schweizer Hitparade)	97
UK Singles Downloads (OCC)	33
UK Singles Sales (OCC)	34

== Certifications ==
Region	Certification	Certified units/sales
Latvia (LaIPA)	2× Platinum	8,000,000

== Release history ==
Release dates and formats for "Bur man laimi"
Region	Date	Format(s)	Version	Label	Ref.
Various	4 December 2024	Digital download; streaming	Original	Self-released	
Various	4 April 2025	Digital download; streaming	Acoustic	Self-released	
