= Wasted Love =

2025 single by JJ

Single by JJ

from the EP Into the Unknown
- Released: 6 March 2025
- Studio: DéGa Sound Studio (Pomáz, Hungary)
- Genre: Operatic pop; techno
- Length: 2:45
- Label: Manifester; Warner Music Central Europe
- Songwriters: Johannes Pietsch; Teodora Špirić; Thomas Thurner
- Composers: Johannes Pietsch; Teodora Špirić; Thomas Thurner; Zoltán Pad
- Producers: Pele Loriano; Thomas Thurner; Wojciech Kostrzewa

JJ singles chronology
"Wasted Love" (2025)	"Back to Forgetting" (2025)

Music video
- "Wasted Love" on YouTube

Eurovision Song Contest 2025 entry
- Country: Austria
- Artist: JJ
- Language: English
- Composers: Johannes Pietsch; Teodora Špirić; Thomas Thurner
- Lyricists: Johannes Pietsch; Teodora Špirić; Thomas Thurner

Finals performance
- Semi-final result: 5th
- Semi-final points: 104
- Final result: 1st
- Final points: 436

Entry chronology
- ◄ "We Will Rave" (2024)
- "Tanzschein" (2026) ►

Official performance video
- "Wasted Love" (second semi-final) on YouTube "Wasted Love" (grand final) on YouTube

"Wasted Love" is the debut single by Austrian singer JJ. The song was released on 6 March 2025 and was written by JJ himself alongside Teodora Špirić and Thomas Thurner. It represented Austria in the Eurovision Song Contest 2025, where it won the contest with 436 points. In the process, the song became the first winning song for Austria since Conchita Wurst's victory in 2014 with "Rise Like a Phoenix".

It is described by JJ as a song that describes his own personal experiences with unrequited love and its conflicting feelings between pain and beauty. The song drew positive reception in most critical reviews, receiving praise for its musical composition and JJ's vocal abilities. After the song's victory in the contest, "Wasted Love" enjoyed commercial success in numerous countries, peaking at number one in its native Austria and Greece, within the top five in Lithuania and Switzerland, and within the top ten in five additional countries. It was also certified gold by IFPI Austria.

== Background and composition ==
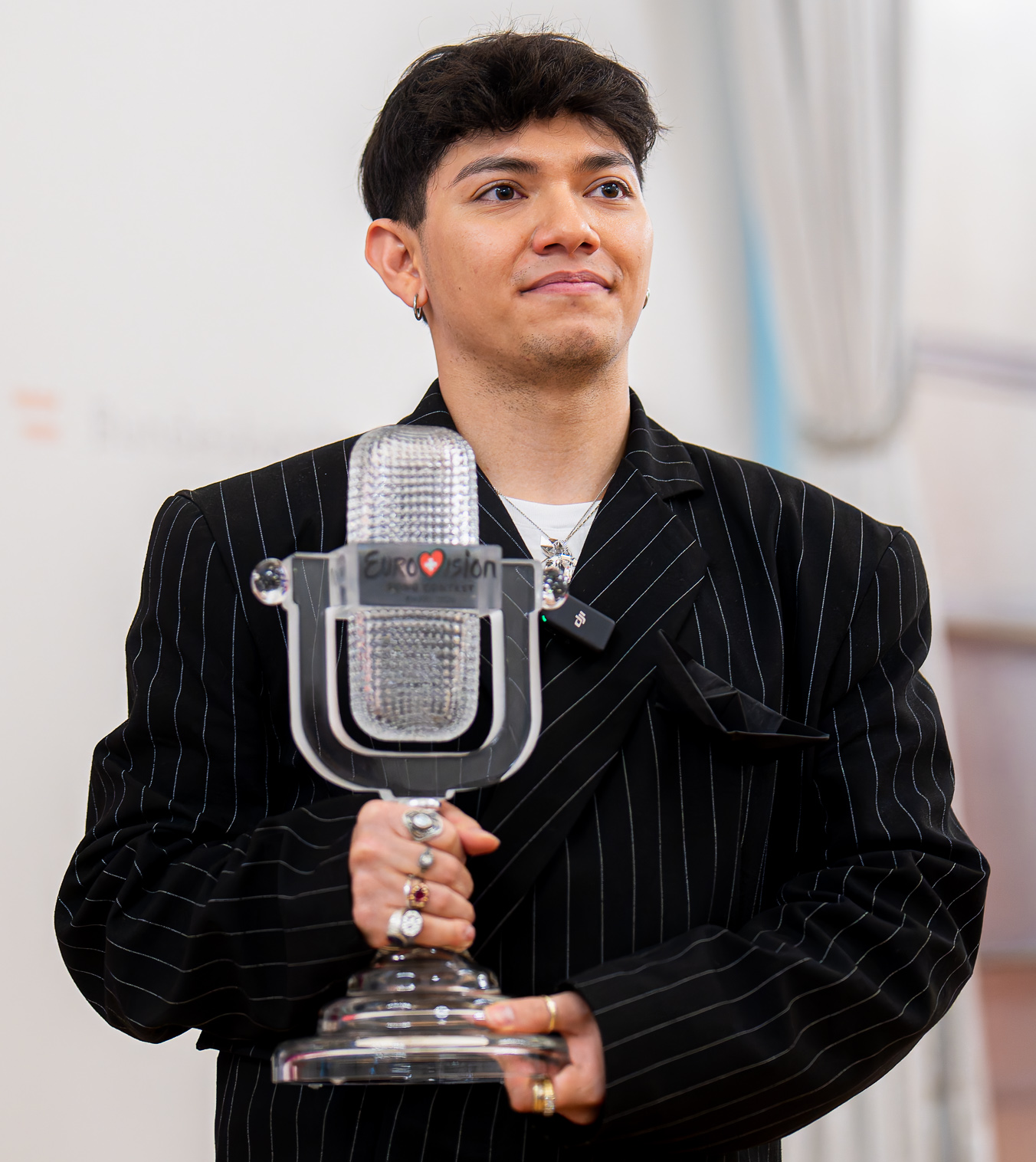
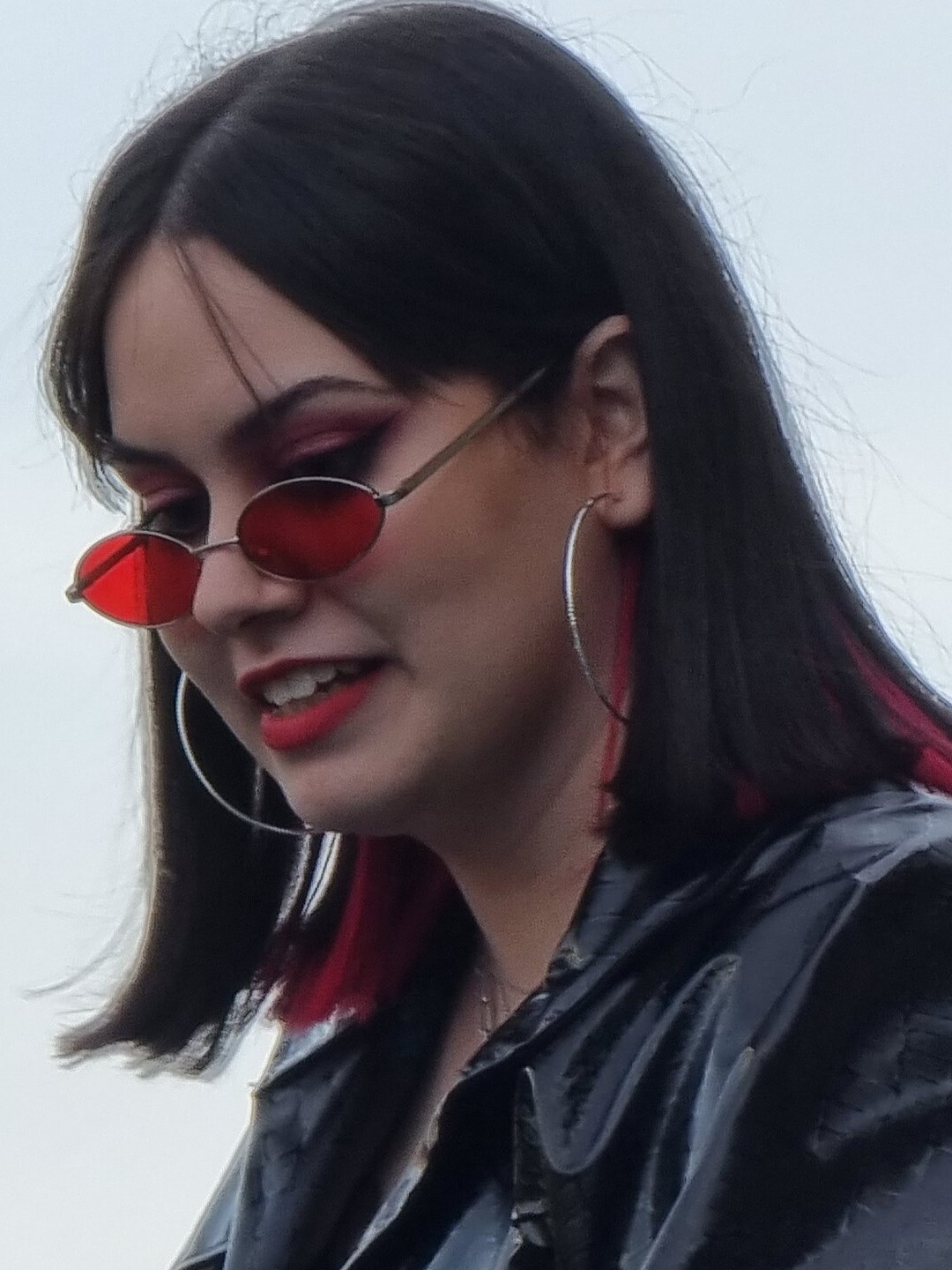
"Wasted Love" was co-written by Johannes Pietsch (left), Teodora Špirić (right), and Thomas Thurner.

"Wasted Love" was written by Johannes Pietsch (known professionally as JJ), Teodora Špirić (known professionally as Teya), and Thomas Thurner, with production handled by Thurner, Pele Loriano, and Wojciech Kostrzewa. Špirić had represented Austria in the Eurovision Song Contest 2023 alongside Salena with the song "Who the Hell Is Edgar?". According to Kleine Zeitung, the song was created within one day in the summer of 2024. The song was released on 6 March 2025.

In press statements and interviews, JJ stated that the song was inspired by his own experiences with unrequited love in 2024, describing the feeling as "floating on a fragile paper boat at sea" that disintegrates. He further added that the feeling was "undeniably beautiful in this naïve devotion. Because in the end, it is beautiful to simply be able to love – no matter how wasted." He later added that he wanted to emphasise the importance of love for humanity, stating in a press conference, "Love wins. In my song I was talking about how love is wasted, but love wins. Spread love, forget hate, love is the strongest force."

== Music video and promotion ==
Along with the song's release, an accompanying music video directed by Vesely Marek was released on the same day. The video itself was filmed in numerous locations across Austria, including a pine forest near Wiener Neustadt, a diving school, a studio in Lower Austria, and a theater in Baden, with filming on the video taking place over the course of five days in February 2025. In a statement given to Wiwibloggs, Marek stated that the video was split into five acts, detailing a "visual journey into the deep abyss of unrequited love". One shot within the music video features JJ placing a paper boat into a body of water, which proceeds to sink.

To promote the song, JJ participated in various Eurovision pre-parties before the contest throughout the months of March and April 2025, including Eurovision in Concert on 5 April, the London Eurovision Party on 13 April, and Pre-Party ES on 19 April. On 11 April, JJ released a duet mashup of "Wasted Love" and "Rise Like a Phoenix", the winning Austrian entry of the Eurovision Song Contest 2014, with its performer Conchita Wurst.

== Critical reception ==
=== Austrian media and personalities ===
Die Presse's Klemens Patek described the song as a "well-rounded song without seeming too contrived" compared to other songs in the contest, praising the musical composition of the song's verses. Der Standard's Ljubiša Tošić commended JJ's vocal abilities and the song's high energy musical composition, stating that the song was a "perfect fit for the Song Contest". Andi Knoll, the Austrian commentator for Eurovision, stated to Kurier that he thought the song's classical musical composition was "incredibly Austrian", adding, "It's an opera in three minutes. And although it's so demanding, it's also so catchy." "Wasted Love" received positive reception from multiple past Austrian Eurovision contestants, including 1991 representative Thomas Forstner, 2003 representative Alf Poier, and 2021 representative Vincent Bueno.

=== Eurovision-related and international media ===
In a Wiwibloggs review containing several reviews from several critics, the song was rated 7.87 out of 10 points, earning fifth out of the 37 songs competing in that year's Eurovision in the site's annual ranking that year. ESC Beat's Doron Lahav ranked the song fourth overall, writing that "this is one of the few songs that gave me winner vibes this year" due to its musical composition and gradual buildup in intensity. Jon O'Brien, a writer for Vulture, ranked the song 12th overall, describing it as an "Über-dramatic effort" but admitting that "classical purists" would not like the song "particularly for the fact its outro suddenly veers from the concert hall into the warehouse rave". Rob Picheta, writer for American outlet CNN, ranked it second out of the 26 finalists in Eurovision 2025, commending JJ's vocal abilities and proclaiming it as "the best song at the competition". However, he also admitted that the song was "far too similar to 'The Code'", which he thought could affect the song's chances at victory. The Times' Ed Potton ranked it eighth out of the 26 finalists, rating the song four out of five stars, also praising JJ's vocal abilities alongside the song's "boshing techno finale".

NPR's Glen Weldon included the song in his honourable mentions of their list of best songs in Eurovision 2025, describing the song as a "great big bowl of opera sauce with a bit of club banger crumbled in". Yle's Eva Frantz gave the song an 8 out of 10 rating, writing that the song had a high chance of scoring high in the juries. However, she also admitted that she thought chances at the song winning were hindered by the similarities it had to Nemo's "The Code", the Eurovision 2024 winner. Aftenposten's Robert Hoftun Gjestad rated the song 5 out of 6, praising JJ's "powerful" vocal abilities and the song's transition towards the high-energy, techno finale. The Daily Telegraph's Neil McCormick described the song as a "pretentious hodgepodge style of music you only ever really get at Eurovision", stating that it was "contrived and deeply irritating if you listen to it more than once". German satirist Jan Böhmermann stated on an FM4 radio show that "We think JJ has to be number one... If JJ manages to perform like in the single... then JJ really has a chance of winning!”

== Eurovision Song Contest 2025 ==
=== Internal selection ===
Austria's broadcaster for the Eurovision Song Contest, Österreichischer Rundfunk (ORF), officially announced their participation in the Eurovision Song Contest 2025 on 7 September 2024, deciding their representative via an internal selection. In October 2024, it was reported by Austrian media that eight entries from seven artists, including Dodo Muhrer who previously represented Austria at Eurovision in 2015 as part of The Makemakes, as well as Johannes Pietsch, Kayla Krystin, Nnoa and Philip Piller, had been shortlisted following a live casting round at the ORF studios. On 30 January 2025, "Wasted Love" performed by Pietsch, under the stage name JJ, was announced by ORF as the Austrian entry for the Eurovision Song Contest 2025 during the radio show Ö3-Wecker. "Wasted Love" was selected from the eight shortlisted entries by a panel of 30 local and international music industry and Eurovision experts as well as nearly 30 international OGAE fan club representatives from five countries and the ORF Eurovision Song Contest Team.

=== At Eurovision ===
The Eurovision Song Contest 2025 took place at the St. Jakobshalle in Basel, Switzerland, and consisted of two semi-finals held on the respective dates of 13 and 15 May and the final on 17 May 2025. During the allocation draw held on 28 January 2025, Austria was drawn to compete in the second semi-final, performing in the first half of the show. JJ was later drawn to perform in sixth, after Armenia's Parg and before Greece's Klavdia.

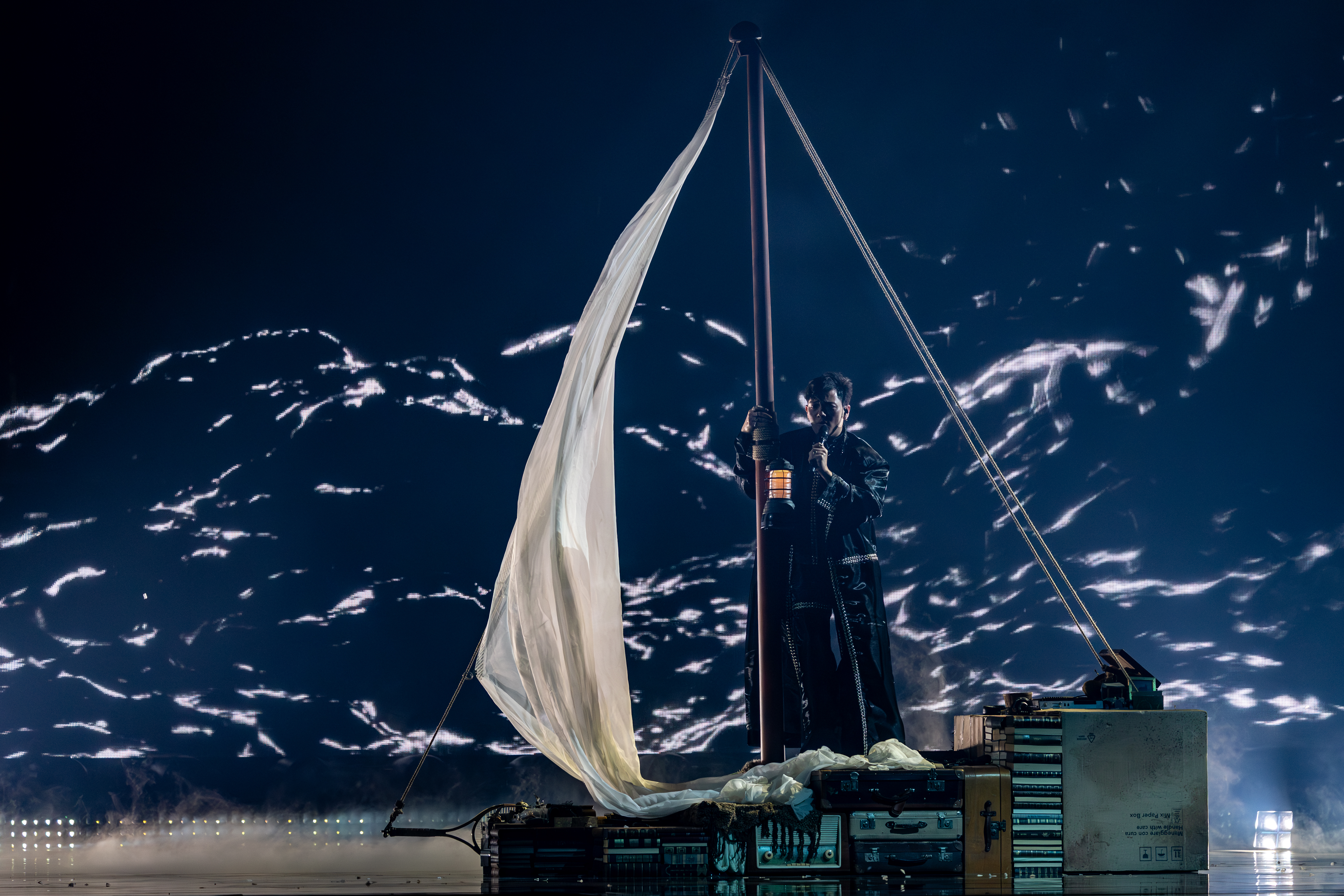
JJ performing "Wasted Love" at a Eurovision 2025 dress rehearsal before the grand final.

For its Eurovision performance, Sergio Jaen was appointed as the staging director. The performance featured JJ alone in a black denim outfit designed by Finnish designer Teemu Muurimäki; according to Muurimäki, the outfit was "inspired by a stormy black ocean". The performance is filmed under a black-and-white filter, with a boat prop made out of crates, a wooden mast, and a white sail being predominantly featured. During the performance, JJ performs choreography that symbolizes a boat out in rough seas, with JJ shown struggling to cling onto the boat while a wind machine blows during the song's second chorus. Nearing the end of the performance, an LED background of waves and stormy clouds with strobe lights appear, amplifying a chaotic environment. At the end, the storm and chaotic nature of the performance dissipates, with the background showing a lighthouse as a symbol of hope. "Wasted Love" secured a position in the grand final, finishing in fifth with 104 points.

JJ performed a repeat of his performance in the grand final on 17 May. The song performed ninth, after the United Kingdom's Remember Monday and before Iceland's Væb. After the results were announced, JJ finished with a total score of 436 points, with a split score of 258 jury points and 178 televoting points. Regarding the jury, the score was the highest out of any finalist. JJ's total score was enough to earn him the victory, finishing 79 points above the runner-up, Yuval Raphael's "New Day Will Rise" from Israel. Regarding the jury vote, the song received eight sets of the maximum 12 points. However, the song did not receive any sets of 12 points from the televote; the highest amount of points given via televote was five sets of 10 points. In response to his victory, JJ encouraged in a post-Eurovision press conference to prioritize and to spread love. JJ, who identifies as queer, later added that as the third consecutive LGBTQ+ victor at Eurovision, his victory was a representation of "amazing acceptance and equality for everyone".

=== Reactions to performance and victory ===
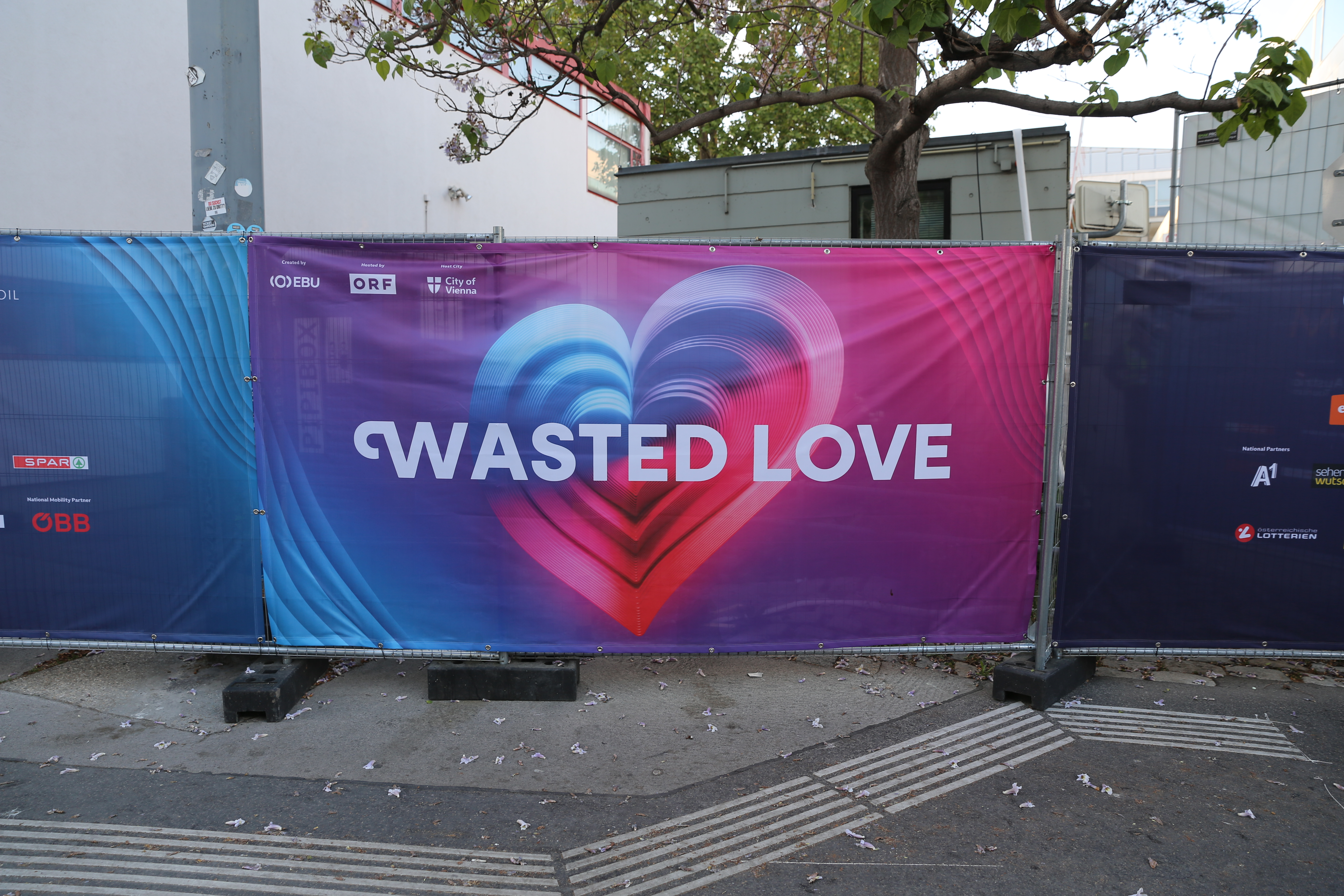
A fence poster in Vienna, Austria put for the Eurovision Song Contest 2026 tributing Wasted Love

In a Guardian live blog, Martin Belam praised the genre change within the song, predicting a top-three finish and adding that "I’ve also added it to my all-time “Eurovision bangers” playlist... I really want it to win." El Mundo's Andrea M. Rosa del Pino described JJ's performance as strong due to his "incomparable voice", adding that "at the end of the performance, the euphoric shouts were even louder. There were 37 seconds of noise." El País' Carlos Marcos praised the performance's choreography and JJ's vocal abilities, but lamented that "he is not accompanied by a better song". The Times's Bianca Schofield wrote that the song was an "obligatory dull ballad accompanied by mounds of dry ice", comparing the song to entries sent that year by Montenegro, Serbia, and Israel.

In response to the victory, The Independent's Mark Beaumont stated that with the song being the second consecutive opera-pop victor, "expect future Eurovisions to be awash with tracks resembling rave remixes of Tosca. And for the event to become ever more about optics than earworms." Kurier's Gert Korentschnig wrote that the song showcased JJ's "versatile personality" and that it was "a worthy successor to Udo Jürgens and Conchita at the ESC". Der Spiegel's Felix Bayer compared the victory to Nemo's "The Code", last year's winner, writing that both songs had "a rapid succession of very different musical parts. This in turn lends itself to telling a story to the music with changing images". Bayer added that the message of love within the song was "a message that can't be the wrong one in these times". Die Weltwoche's Thomas Renggli praised the performance, writing that JJ "makes it clear what it takes to turn the heads of the jury and audience: big gestures, a good voice, a concise song, and the corresponding story that also captivates the queer clientele".

== Cover versions ==
Spanish singer Melani García impersonated JJ in the first semi-final of the twelfth season of Tu Cara Me Suena, winning the semi-final. Her performance was praised by JJ as well.

== Awards and nominations ==
Awards and nominations for "Wasted Love"
Year	Award	Category	Result	Ref.
2025	OUTmusic Award	Eurovision Song of the Year	Runner-up	
2026	Amadeus Austrian Music Awards	Ö3 Song of the Year	Nominated	

== Track listing ==
Digital download/streaming

1. "Wasted Love" – 2:44

Digital download/streaming – Cyril remix

1. "Wasted Love" (Cyril remix) – 2:24

== Charts ==
=== Weekly charts ===
Weekly chart performance for "Wasted Love"
Chart (2025)	Peak position
Austria (Ö3 Austria Top 40)	1
Belgium (Ultratop 50 Flanders)	28
Croatia International Airplay (Top lista)	53
Finland (Suomen virallinen lista)	10
Germany (GfK)	13
Global 200 (Billboard)	167
Greece International (IFPI)	1
Iceland (Tónlistinn)	10
Ireland (IRMA)	53
Israel (Mako Hitlist)	51
Latvia Streaming (LaIPA)	6
Lithuania (AGATA)	5
Lithuania Airplay (TopHit)	68
Luxembourg (Billboard)	8
Netherlands (Single Top 100)	36
Norway (VG-lista)	27
Poland (Polish Streaming Top 100)	34
Portugal (AFP)	77
Sweden (Sverigetopplistan)	8
Switzerland (Schweizer Hitparade)	3
UK Singles (Official Charts)	53

=== Year-end charts ===
Year-end chart performance for "Wasted Love"
Chart (2025)	Position
Austria (Ö3 Austria Top 40)	56

== Certifications ==
Certifications and sales for "Wasted Love"
Region	Certification	Certified units/sales
Austria (IFPI Austria)	Gold	15,000^{‡}
Streaming
Greece (IFPI Greece)	Gold	1,000,000^{†}
^{‡} Sales+streaming figures based on certification alone.^{†} Streaming-only figures based on certification alone.

== Release history ==
Release history and formats for "Wasted Love"
Region	Date	Format(s)	Version	Label	Ref.
Various	6 March 2025	Digital download; streaming	Original	Manifester; Warner Music Central Europe	
Various	13 June 2025	Digital download; streaming	Cyril remix	Manifester; Warner Music Central Europe	

Preceded by "The Code" by Nemo	Eurovision Song Contest winners 2025	Succeeded by "Bangaranga" by Dara
