= Emily Busvine =

Austrian radio presenter and host (born 1996)

- Born: Emily Busvine; 1996 (age 29–30); Vienna, Austria
- Education: University of Cambridge, Diplomatic Academy of Vienna
- Occupations: Radio host; TV presenter; actress

Emily Busvine (born 1996) is an Austrian-English radio presenter, show host and actress.

== Background ==
Busvine was born in 1996 in Vienna and grew up in Berlin, Warsaw and Moscow. She studied political science and social anthropology at the University of Cambridge and moved back to Vienna in 2018, where she completed a master's degree at the Diplomatic Academy of Vienna.

== Career ==
In 2020, she began an internship at Radio FM4. Following the internship, Busvine began working at Radio FM4. She also hosts the magazine programme OKFM4 and since 2026, has hosted the FM4 morning show alongside Philipp Emberger.

Between 2023 and 2024, Busvine acted in the films Red Rocks (2023), For A While (2024) and Die Guten Jahre (2024).

In February 2026, Busvine broadcast and translated the Austrian national selection "Vienna Calling - Wer Singt Für Österreich?" live on YouTube and later took on the role of green room host in Eurovision that year, supporting hosts Victoria Swarovski and Michael Ostrowski. The role included serving coffee and having conversations with participants in the Viennese Coffee House-style green room.

Emily Busvine at the "Vienna Calling" broadcast

In May 2026, she also took part in the Internationale Tage der Information in Innsbruck, where she participated in talks about public information journalism and whistleblowing as a moderator.
