= Eurovision Song Contest 2026 =

International song competition

- United by Music

Dates and venue
- Semi-final 1: 12 May 2026
- Semi-final 2: 14 May 2026
- Final: 16 May 2026
- Venue: Wiener Stadthalle; Vienna, Austria

Organisation
- Organiser: European Broadcasting Union (EBU)
- ESC director: Martin Green
- ESC executive producer: Gert Kark

Production
- Host broadcaster: Österreichischer Rundfunk (ORF)
- Director: Michael Kögler; Robin Hofwander
- Executive producer: Michael Krön
- Presenters: Victoria Swarovski; Michael Ostrowski; Emily Busvine (green room)

Participants
- Number of entries: 35
- Number of finalists: 25
- Returning countries: Bulgaria; Moldova; Romania
- Non-returning countries: Iceland; Ireland; Netherlands; Slovenia; Spain
- Participation map: Finalist countries Countries eliminated in the semi-finals Countries that participated in the past but not in 2026

Vote
- Voting system: Each country awards two sets of 12, 10, 8–1 points to ten songs. Online votes from viewers in non-participating countries are aggregated and awarded as one set of points.
- Winning song: Bulgaria "Bangaranga"

The Eurovision Song Contest 2026 was the 70th edition of the Eurovision Song Contest. It consisted of two semi-finals on 12 and 14 May and a final on 16 May 2026, held at Wiener Stadthalle in Vienna, Austria, and presented by Victoria Swarovski and Michael Ostrowski, with Emily Busvine acting as the green room host. It was organised by the European Broadcasting Union (EBU) and host broadcaster Österreichischer Rundfunk (ORF), which staged the event after winning the 2025 contest for Austria with the song "Wasted Love" by JJ.

Broadcasters from thirty-five countries participated in the contest, two fewer than in 2025 and the smallest number of participants since 2003, before the introduction of semi-finals. Iceland, Ireland, the Netherlands, Slovenia, and Spain opted not to participate in protest at Israel's inclusion in the context of the Gaza war, matching the record for the largest number of boycotting countries in the contest's history set in 1970, while Bulgaria, Moldova, and Romania returned after absences from recent editions.

The winner was Bulgaria with the song "Bangaranga", performed by Dara and written by her with Anne Judith Wik, Cristian Tarcea, and Dimitris Kontopoulos. The song won both the jury vote and televote, the first entry to do so since Portugal in 2017, and gave Bulgaria its first win in the contest. Israel, Romania, Australia, and Italy rounded out the top five, with Romania equaling its best placements from 2005 and 2010 while achieving its highest points total to date. Luxembourg failed to qualify for the final for the first time, leaving Ukraine as the only country to have always progressed from the semi-finals since their introduction in 2004. (Note: No country has always participated in the final since the introduction of semi-finals in 2004. Ukraine, despite having always reached the final, did not participate in the 2015 and 2019 contests.)

The EBU reported that the contest had a television audience of 131 million viewers in 35 European markets, a decrease of 35 million viewers from the previous edition and the lowest viewing figures since the 2012 contest, which attracted 103 million viewers.

== Location ==
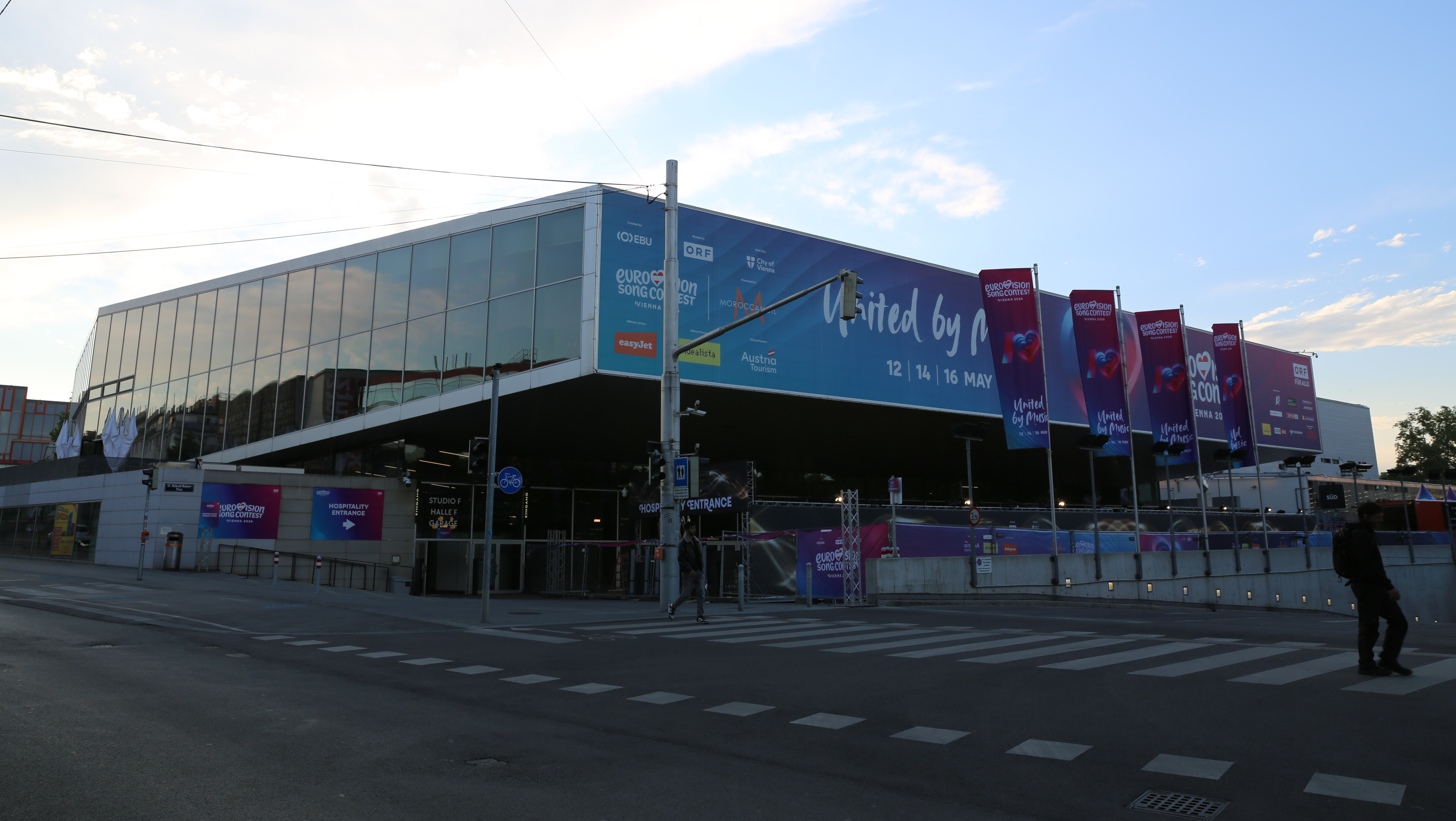
Wiener Stadthalle – host venue of the 2026 contest

The 2026 contest took place in Vienna, Austria, following the country's victory at the 2025 contest with the song "Wasted Love", performed by JJ. It was the third time that Austria has hosted the contest, having previously done so in 1967 and 2015, both times also in Vienna. The selected venue for the contest was the 16,152-seat Wiener Stadthalle, which had previously hosted the contest in 2015.

In addition to the main venue, the Rathausplatz was the location of the Eurovision Village, which hosted performances by contest participants and local artists as well as screenings of the live shows for the general public. The Prater Dome nightclub hosted the EuroClub, which organised the official after-parties and private performances by contest participants. The "Turquoise Carpet" event was held on 10 May 2026 at the Burgtheater, with the contestants and their delegations walking across the Eurovision Village at Rathausplatz to be presented before accredited press and fans, before ending at the Vienna City Hall, where the opening ceremony followed.

=== Bidding phase ===
The location of the host city Vienna (in blue), cities and towns that submitted bids (in red) and cities and towns that expressed interest but ultimately did not bid (in grey)

Following Austria's victory in the 2025 contest, the host broadcaster, Österreichischer Rundfunk (ORF), held a press conference at which its director, Roland Weißmann, identified the suitability of venues and proximity to airports as the principal criteria in the selection of the host city. ORF's programme director, Stefanie Groiss-Horowitz, observed that no large arenas had been newly built in the country in recent years, but encouraged municipalities with viable proposals to submit bids.

A number of Austrian cities expressed interest in hosting the 2026 contest within days of the nation's victory in 2025. On 18 May 2025, the mayor of Vienna, Michael Ludwig, confirmed the city's intention to bid. The same day, Graz announced that it was examining a potential bid, with mayor Elke Kahr singling out the Stadthalle Graz as a suitable venue. The Schwarzl Freizeit Zentrum, also in Graz, was put forward as a potential venue by its concert manager and operator, Klaus Leutgeb. Also on 18 May, Innsbruck and Wels confirmed that they would bid, with the Olympiahalle and a new exhibition hall respectively proposed as venues. Oberwart likewise declared its interest in hosting. On 19 May, the mayor of St. Pölten, Matthias Stadler, proposed the VAZ St. Pölten as a venue. On 26 May, Ebreichsdorf submitted a proposal to host the contest in a temporary venue.

ORF launched the bidding process on 2 June 2025 by opening a window for cities and municipalities to declare their interest. Those candidates received the detailed tender documents and were required to submit their bids by 4 July. Ebreichsdorf withdrew from the process on 15 June, followed by Oberwart on 21 June, Graz on 27 June, and Wels on 1 July. Vienna and Innsbruck were the only cities to submit bids by the deadline. On 20 August, the EBU and ORF announced Vienna as the host city.

Key:
† Host city ^ Submitted a bid

City	Venue	Notes	Ref.
Ebreichsdorf	Temporary arena	The proposed venue was a temporary arena with a capacity for 20,000 people. Another venue for a public viewing of the final with a capacity of 30,000 would have been set up. Withdrew from bidding on 15 June.	
Graz	Stadthalle Graz	Withdrew from bidding on 27 June 2025.	
Graz	Schwarzl Freizeit Zentrum	Withdrew from bidding on 27 June 2025.	
Innsbruck ^	Olympiahalle	Hosted the figure skating and ice hockey events at both the 1964 and 1976 Winter Olympic Games.	
Oberwart	Messe Oberwart	Withdrew from bidding on 21 June 2025.	
Vienna †	Wiener Stadthalle	Hosted the 2015 contest.	
Wels and Linz	Messe Wels	Joint bid, with Wels hosting the contest proper. The venue was under construction at the time of the bidding process, and was completed in March 2026. Withdrew from bidding on 1 July 2025.	

== Participants ==
Eurovision Song Contest 2026 – Participation summaries by country
- Albania; Armenia; Australia; Austria; Azerbaijan; Belgium; Bulgaria; Croatia; Cyprus; Czechia; Denmark; Estonia; Finland; France; Georgia; Germany; Greece; Israel; Italy; Latvia; Lithuania; Luxembourg; Malta; Moldova; Montenegro; Norway; Poland; Portugal; Romania; San Marino; Serbia; Sweden; Switzerland; Ukraine; United Kingdom

Eligibility for participation in the Eurovision Song Contest requires a national broadcaster with active EBU membership capable of receiving the contest via the Eurovision network and broadcasting the contest live nationwide. The EBU issues an invitation to participate in the contest to all active members.

On 15 December 2025, the EBU announced that broadcasters from 35 countries would participate in the 2026 contest. Bulgaria returned after a three-year absence, Romania returned after a two-year absence, and Moldova returned after a one-year absence. Iceland, Ireland, the Netherlands, Slovenia, and Spain, all of which participated in 2025, opted not to take part in protest at the inclusion of Israel in the context of the Gaza war, as well as the Israeli government's attempts to influence the results in the previous two editions. This marked the largest boycott in the contest's history since 1970.

The contest featured two returning artists: Estonia's Vanilla Ninja had previously represented Switzerland in 2005, and San Marino's Senhit had previously represented the country in 2011 and 2021 (and was set to do so in 2020 before that year's event was cancelled). In addition, Poland's Alicja was also set to represent the country in 2020; Aliona Moon, who provided backing vocals for Moldova's Satoshi, had previously represented Moldova in 2013 and provided backing vocals for Pasha Parfeni in 2012; Georgia's Bzikebi had previously won the Junior Eurovision Song Contest 2008 for the country; and Belgium's Essyla had previously represented the country in Eurovision Choir 2019 as part of the choir Almakalia.

Eurovision Song Contest 2026 participants
Country	Broadcaster	Artist	Song	Language	Songwriter(s)	Ref.
Albania	RTSH	Alis	"Nân"	Albanian	Alis Kallaçi; Desara Gjini	
Armenia	AMPTV	Simón	"Paloma Rumba"	English	David Tserunyan; Eva Voskanyan; Lilit Navasardyan; Roza Kostandyan	
Australia	SBS	Delta Goodrem	"Eclipse"	English	Delta Goodrem; Ferras Alqaisi; Jonas Myrin; Michael Fatkin	
Austria	ORF	Cosmó	"Tanzschein"	German	Benjamin Gedeon; Elias Stejskal; Ella Stern	
Azerbaijan	İTV	Jiva	"Just Go"	English, Azerbaijani	Fuad Javadov; Nurlana Jafarova	
Belgium	RTBF	Essyla	"Dancing on the Ice"	English	Alice Van Eesbeeck; Barbara Petitjean; Emil Stengele; Nicolas d'Avell	
Bulgaria	BNT	Dara	"Bangaranga"	English	Anne Judith Wik; Cristian Tarcea; Darina Yotova; Dimitris Kontopoulos	
Croatia	HRT	Lelek	"Andromeda"	Croatian	Filip Lacković; Lazar Pajić; Tomislav Roso; Zorica Pajić	
Cyprus	CyBC	Antigoni	"Jalla"	English, Greek	Antigoni Buxton; Charalambous Kallona; Connor Mullally-Knight; Demetris Nikolaou; Klejdi Lupa; Paris Kalpos; Trey Qua	
Czechia	ČT	Daniel Zizka	"Crossroads"	English	Daniel Žižka; Viliam Béreš	
Denmark	DR	Søren Torpegaard Lund	"Før vi går hjem"	Danish	Clara Sofie Fabricius; Søren Torpegaard Lund; Thomas Meilstrup; Valdemar Littauer Bendixen	
Estonia	ERR	Vanilla Ninja	"Too Epic to Be True"	English	Sven Lõhmus	
Finland	Yle	Linda Lampenius and Pete Parkkonen	"Liekinheitin"	Finnish	Antti Riihimäki; Lauri Halavaara; Linda Lampenius; Pete Parkkonen; Vilma Alina Lähteenmäki	
France	France Télévisions	Monroe	"Regarde!"	French	Christopher Cohen; Fred Savio; Fredie Marche; Maxime Morise	
Georgia	GPB	Bzikebi	"On Replay"	English	Giga Kukhianidze; Liza Japaridze	
Germany	SWR (Note: On behalf of the German public broadcasting consortium ARD)	Sarah Engels	"Fire"	English	Dario Schürmann; Luisa Heinemann; Raphael Lott; Sarah Engels; Valentin Boes	
Greece	ERT	Akylas	"Ferto" (Φέρτο)	Greek	Akylas Mytilineos; Orfeas Nonis; Theofilos Pouzbouris; Thomas Papathanasis	
Israel	IPBC	Noam Bettan	"Michelle"	French, Hebrew, English	Nadav Aharoni; Noam Bettan; Tzlil Klifi; Yuval Raphael	
Italy	RAI	Sal Da Vinci	"Per sempre sì"	Italian	Alessandro La Cava; Eugenio Maimone; Francesco Sorrentino; Federica Abbate; Federico Mercuri; Giordano Cremona; Salvatore Michael Sorrentino	
Latvia	LSM	Atvara	"Ēnā"	Latvian	Jānis Jačmenkins; Liene Stūrmane	
Lithuania	LRT	Lion Ceccah	"Sólo quiero más"	Lithuanian, English	Aurimas Galvelis; Tomas Alenčikas	
Luxembourg	RTL	Eva Marija	"Mother Nature"	English	Eva Marija Kavaš Puc; Julie Aagaard; Maria Broberg; Thomas Stengaard	
Malta	PBS	Aidan	"Bella"	English, Maltese	Aidan Cassar; Joep van den Boom; Sarah Bonnici	
Moldova	TRM	Satoshi	"Viva, Moldova!"	Romanian	Andrei Vulpe; Cătălin Temciuc; Vasile Advahov; Vlad Sabajuc	
Montenegro	RTCG	Tamara Živković	"Nova zora" (Нова зора)	Montenegrin	Boris Subotić	
Norway	NRK	Jonas Lovv	"Ya Ya Ya"	English	Jonas Lovv Hellesøy; Sondre Skaftun	
Poland	TVP	Alicja	"Pray"	English	Alicja Szemplińska; Sinclair Alan Malcolm; Weronika Gabryelczyk	
Portugal	RTP	Bandidos do Cante	"Rosa"	Portuguese	Duarte Farias; Francisco Pereira; Francisco Pestana; Francisco Raposo; Gonçalo Narciso; Gui Alface; José Carlos Coelho Almeida Tavares; Luis Aleixo; Miguel Costa	
Romania	TVR	Alexandra Căpitănescu	"Choke Me"	English	Alexandra Căpitănescu; Călin-Alexandru Grăjdan; Elvis Silitră; Ștefan Condrea	
San Marino	SMRTV	Senhit (Note: Features uncredited vocals by Boy George)	"Superstar"	English	Anderz Wrethov; George Alan O'Dowd; Julie Aagaard; John-Emil Johansson; Thomas Stengaard; Senhit Zadik Zadik	
Serbia	RTS	Lavina	"Kraj mene" (Крај мене)	Serbian	Andrija Cvetanović; Bojan Ilić; Ivan Jegdić; Luka Aranđelović; Nikola Petrović; Pavle Aranđelović; Pavle Samardžić	
Sweden	SVT	Felicia	"My System"	English	Audun Agnar; Emily Harbakk; Felicia Eriksson; Julie Bergan; Theresa Rex	
Switzerland	SRG SSR	Veronica Fusaro	"Alice"	English	Charlie McClean; Veronica Fusaro	
Ukraine	Suspilne	Leléka	"Ridnym" (Рідним)	English, Ukrainian	Adama Cefalu; Jakob Hegner; Viktoriia Leleka; Yaroslav Dzhus	
United Kingdom	BBC	Look Mum No Computer	"Eins, Zwei, Drei"	English, German	Julie Aagaard; Lasse Midtsian Nymann; Sam Bartle; Thomas Stengaard	

=== Boycotts due to Israeli participation ===
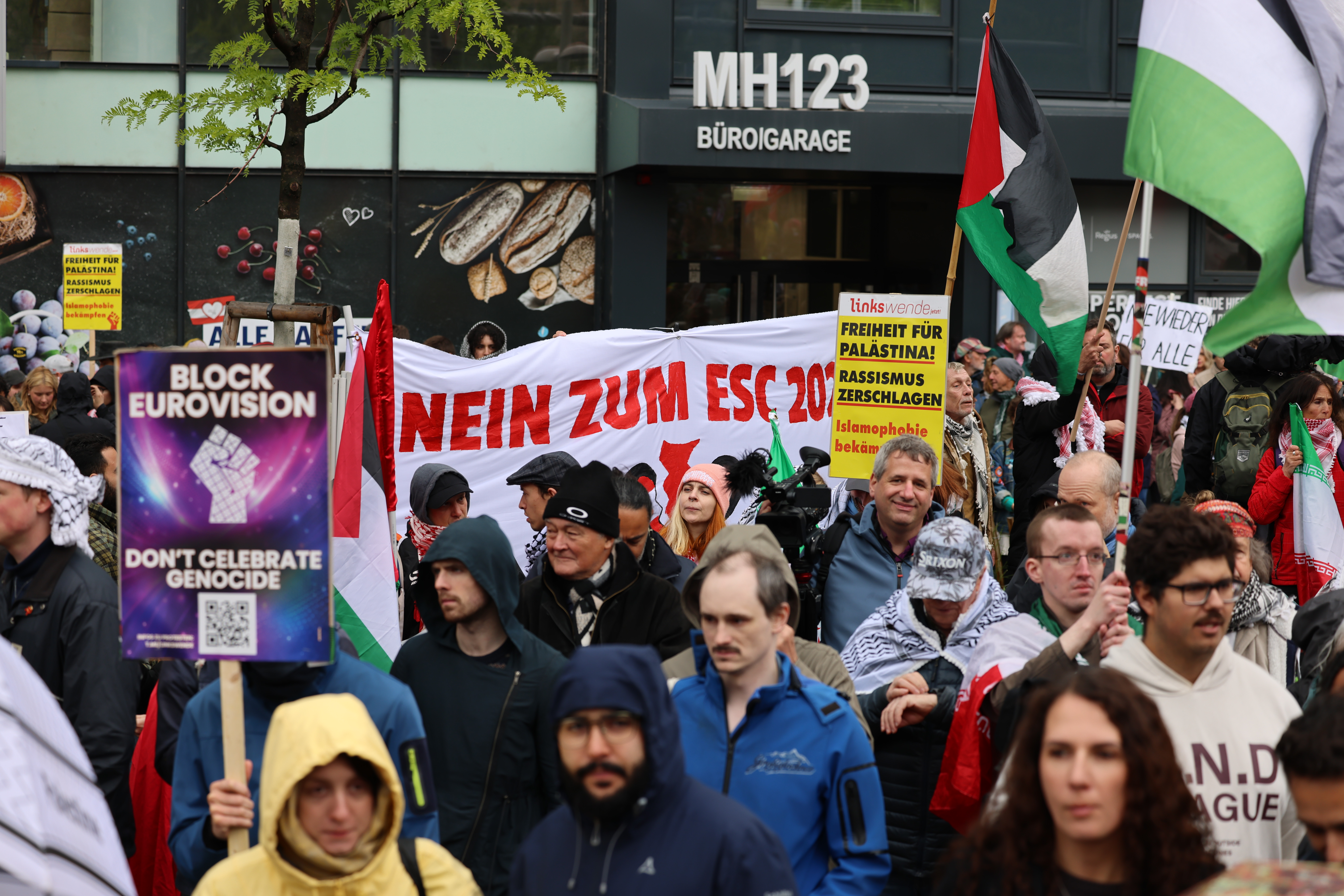
Demonstration in Vienna against Israel's participation on 16 May 2026, the day of the final

The Gaza war has rendered Israel's participation in the contest a subject of controversy, prompting calls for the country's exclusion as well as demonstrations against its involvement at both the 2024 and 2025 editions. Israel's 2024 entry "Hurricane" was also controversial, as an earlier version titled "October Rain" was seen as referencing the 7 October attacks on Israel, a breach of political neutrality rules, which led to it only being accepted by the EBU after a rewrite. Israeli government officials ran advertising campaigns to boost public votes and encourage support for their country's entries in 2024 and 2025, which was cited as one of the factors leading to Israel finishing in fifth place in 2024 and second in 2025, in both cases placing within the top two of the public vote. The existence of such campaigns for the 2024 entry was confirmed by the Israeli Ministry of Foreign Affairs, and similar campaigns for the 2025 entry were detailed by Eurovision News Spotlight, a fact-checking and open-source intelligence initiative by the EBU. The 2025 set of advertisements, published by the Israel Government Advertising Agency, received over 68 million total impressions. Several participating broadcasters called for a rework of the televoting system and an independent audit of individual countries' televoting results following the 2025 final.

Ahead of the 2026 contest, broadcasters from Ireland, the Netherlands, Slovenia, and Spain announced their intention to boycott if Israel were allowed to compete, with the latter three also citing the Israeli advertising campaigns in the previous two editions as one of the reasons. Other broadcasters indicated their intention to participate, dependent on certain conditions being fulfilled by the EBU. The contest's reference group extended its confirmation deadline, before which broadcasters are able to withdraw applications for the 2026 contest without incurring a financial penalty, from 13 October to mid-December to allow for a wide-ranging consultation with broadcasters on Israeli participation, which was set to be determined at the EBU's general assembly on 4 and 5 December. A special general assembly session was planned to be held in early November to discuss and vote on Israel's representation in the contest, but it was cancelled following the implementation of a ceasefire deal and peace plan aimed at ending the war. The 4 December assembly ultimately voted in favour of adopting a series of amendments to the voting system, bypassing a proposed separate vote on Israel's participation and allowing the country to compete. As a result, broadcasters from the four aforementioned countries went ahead with their boycott, joined by Iceland on 10 December, with the Irish, Slovenian and Spanish broadcasters also stating they would not broadcast the contest. This would mark the first time that the event would not be broadcast in Ireland since 1963, in Slovenia since 1985, and in Spain since 1961. The absence of Spain would also mark the first time that the "Big Five" would be incomplete since its expansion with Italy in 2011. The boycott was described by several media outlets as "the biggest crisis in the history of the Eurovision Song Contest". (Note: By the following sources:) Protesting the decision to permit Israel, Nemo, who won for Switzerland in 2024, returned their trophy to the EBU. Charlie McGettigan, who won for Ireland in 1994 alongside Paul Harrington, later stated that he would return his trophy as well.

The following countries' broadcasters confirmed they would boycott in 2026:

- Iceland – Although RÚV planned to select its entry for 2026 through its traditional national final Söngvakeppnin, on 8 September 2025, Stefán Jón Hafstein, chairman of RÚV's board of directors, stated that the broadcaster's participation is "uncertain" and would be dependent on whether Israel is allowed to compete. On 26 November, RÚV's board voted to recommend Israel be excluded, and on 10 December, six days after the assembly vote, it stated that it would boycott the contest but still broadcast the shows.
- Ireland – On 11 September 2025, RTÉ stated "if the participation of Israel goes ahead" it would not compete, citing the "huge loss of life" as well as targeting of journalists in the Gaza war, and that the broadcaster is waiting until the EBU general assembly in December to make a decision. On 4 December, following the assembly vote, RTÉ decided to neither compete in nor broadcast the contest. Eurovision-related programmes still aired during Eurovision week, but regularly scheduled programming continued to be broadcast as normal on RTÉ One and RTÉ2 on the nights of all three shows.
- Netherlands – Despite initially announcing it would internally select an entry for 2026, on 12 September 2025, AVROTROS stated: "We can no longer justify Israel's participation with the continued and serious human suffering in Gaza", and cited the Israeli government campaign as interference in the previous edition's outcome. The broadcaster later stated that it would not change its position for the contest in 2026 even if a ceasefire is reached or the broader Israeli–Palestinian conflict develops otherwise, and would reassess its participation "in subsequent years" dependent on the circumstances at that moment. On 4 December, following the assembly vote, AVROTROS confirmed its boycott of the event. Sister broadcasters NOS and NTR were instead tasked by the overarching body NPO to air the contest through NPO 1 and NPO Radio 2, as those broadcasters are required by Dutch law to broadcast and report on "major national and international (cultural) events".
- Slovenia – On 4 September 2025, RTVSLO stated that it would decide whether to participate in 2026 after the EBU makes a decision on Israel's future participation and address concerns surrounding the "transparency of the vote" in December. The broadcaster later stated its "clear position", on 12 September and again on 27 November, that it would not participate if Israel is allowed to compete. On 4 December, following the assembly vote, RTVSLO decided to neither compete in nor broadcasting the contest. In April 2026, RTVSLO decided to air a slate of programmes named Voices of Palestine from 10 to 20 May, with some of those airing on the nights of the three shows.
- Spain – In May 2025, José Pablo López, chairman of RTVE, initially scheduled the selection of the Spanish entry through Benidorm Fest, the national final format in use since 2022. On 9 September, it was reported that a decision on participation would be made in December, following the EBU general assembly, and that Benidorm Fest would be organised regardless of the decision taken. On 16 September, RTVE's board of directors passed a proposal for the broadcaster not to participate in nor air the contest if Israel participates. On 9 October, RTVE's head of communications María Eizaguirre stated that the broadcaster's position remained unchanged in light of the recently proposed peace plan; López reaffirmed this in front of the Joint Parliamentary Control Committee of the Congress of Deputies and the Senate on 27 November. On 4 December, following the assembly vote, RTVE decided to neither compete in nor broadcast the contest. Regularly scheduled programming continued on La 1 and La 2 the nights of all three shows. At the start time of the final, RTVE aired a message on La 1 in Spanish and English which read, "The Eurovision Song Contest is a competition, but human rights are not. There is no room for indifference. Peace and justice for Palestine".

=== Other countries ===
The EBU member broadcasters in Andorra, Bosnia and Herzegovina, North Macedonia, and Slovakia confirmed non-participation prior to the announcement of the participants list by the EBU. Associate member broadcasters in Canada and Kazakhstan expressed interest in debuting in the contest, however, the EBU confirmed that the two would not do so in 2026.

== Production and format ==
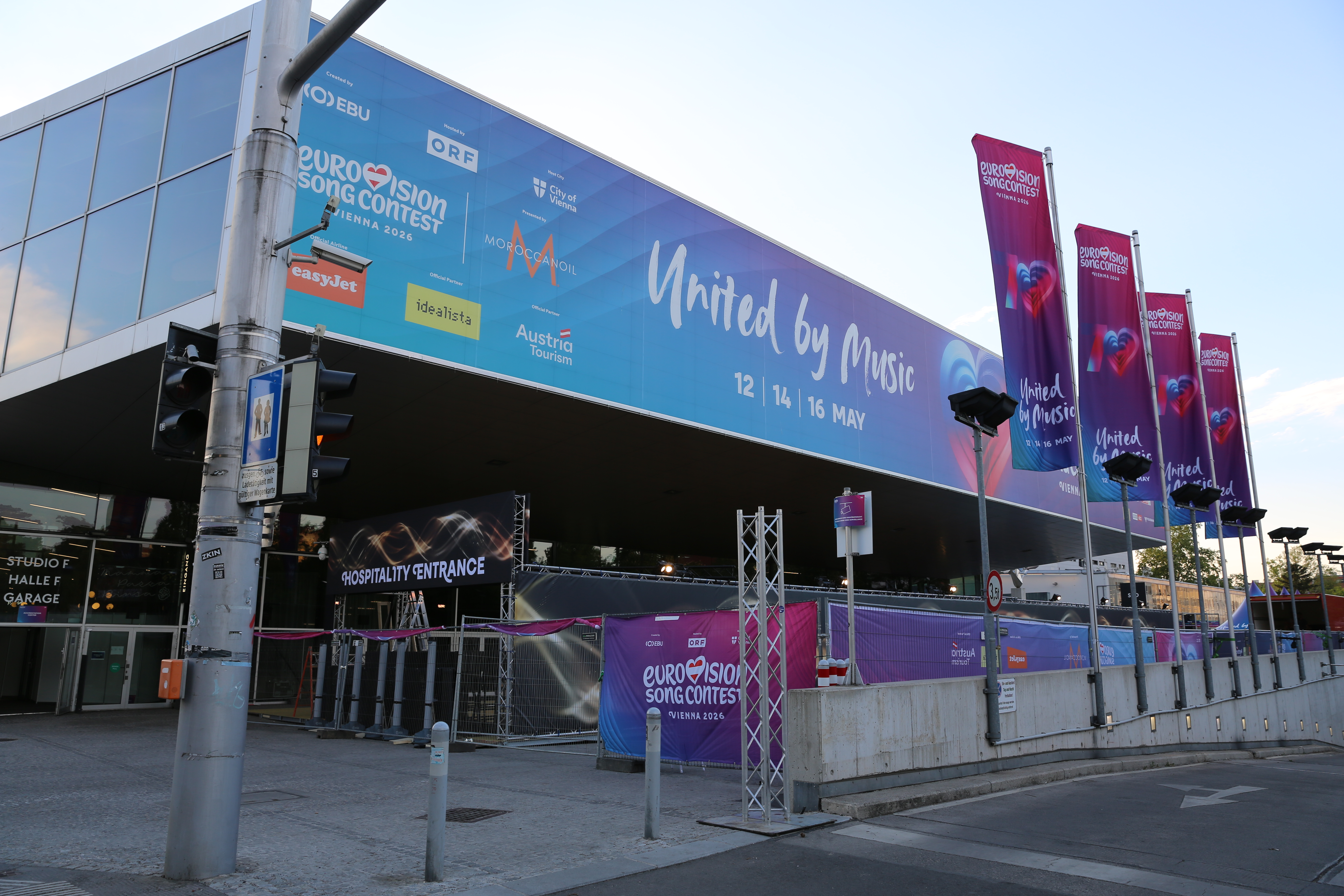
Exterior of Wiener Stadthalle (Hall F) during the Eurovision event weeks

The Eurovision Song Contest 2026 was produced by the Austrian national broadcaster Österreichischer Rundfunk (ORF). The core team consisted of Michael Krön as executive producer, Stefan Zechner as show producer, Daniel Hack as head of production, Christine Tichy as technical manager, Roman Horacek as head of communications, Iris Keutter as marketing manager, Oliver Lingens as event manager, Christina Lassnig as executive assistant, Christina Heinzle-Conrad as secretary-general, and Martin Szerencsi as legal advisor. Zechner, Tichy, Horacek, Keutter, Lingens, and Szerencsi had previously held similar or analogous positions for the 2015 contest in Vienna. Michael Kögler and Robin Hofwander served as multi-camera directors, Dorothee Freiberger and Martin Gellner composed the theme music, and Tim Routledge served as lighting designer.

In June 2025, Martin Österdahl stepped down from his role as the contest's executive supervisor, with ESC director Martin Green temporarily assuming Österdahl's duties. On 1 October, Gert Kark was appointed to the contest's reference group, taking Österdahl's vacated spot. A few days later, it was revealed that he would serve in the newly created position of ESC executive producer.

A study by the research institute EcoAustria estimated the budget for the contest to be at €36 million, with the Municipal Council and Landtag of Vienna allocating €22.6 million and the EBU contributing an expected €5 million.

=== Voting system ===
The 2026 contest introduced several changes to the voting system. The results of the semi-finals were once again to be determined by a combination of jury vote and televote, as they had been from 2010 to 2022. (Note: From 2010 to 2015, the jury votes and televotes were combined into a single set of points, while from 2016 to 2022, the jury and the televote each awarded an independent set of points; the latter system returned to the semi-finals in 2026.) The size of national juries, however, was increased from five to seven members, with two jurors required to be between the ages of 18 and 25, and the range of eligible professional backgrounds was broadened. The maximum number of votes per payment method was reduced from 20 to 10. Voting instructions were updated so as to "discourage disproportionate promotion campaigns...particularly when undertaken or supported by third parties, including governments or governmental agencies". The rules were amended in the wake of the controversy surrounding Israel's result in the 2025 edition.

=== Visual and stage design ===
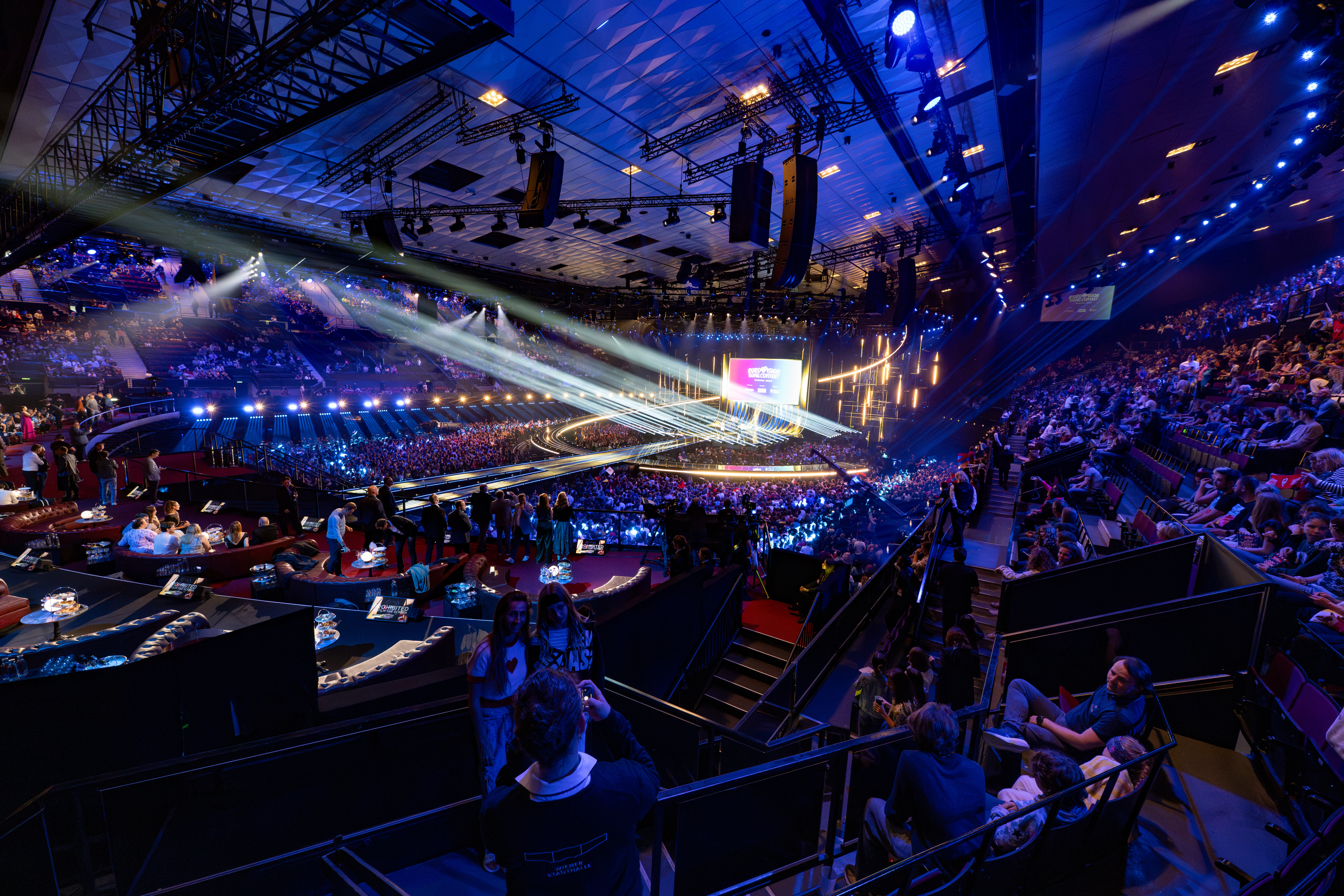
The stage and green room in the arena

The 2026 contest featured a revamped version of the generic logo, designed by the Sheffield-based branding studio Pals to mark the contest's 70th anniversary. A new design element, entitled the "Chameleon Heart", was also introduced. It consists of seventy layers of the "Eurovision heart" rendered in 3D, and is intended to be adaptable to the requirements of future host countries. The stage design was devised, for the third consecutive year, by the German production designer Florian Wieder, who had previously created the sets for eight earlier contests. It drew inspiration from the "creative spirit of the Viennese Secession" and was based upon three leitmotifs: "The Leaf", "The Curved Line" and "The Construct", with the green room connected directly to the stage by means of a walkway. The design of the green room was inspired by Viennese coffee houses. As with the previous edition, a mascot named "Auri" was created for the contest.

=== Postcards ===
The "postcards" were short introductory video sequences broadcast on television while the stage was being prepared for the next entry. Produced by the Mödling-based company Gebhardt Productions and filmed between October 2025 and April 2026, the postcards depicted the competing artists "immersed", by means of projection and chroma keying, in a variety of scenic locations across Austria. A physical postcard was produced for each. The following locations were used for each participating country:

- Albania – Sonnblick Observatory, Hohe Tauern, Salzburg
- Armenia – Waldviertel, Lower Austria
- Australia – Bad Gastein, Salzburg
- Austria – Winden am See, Burgenland
- Azerbaijan – Semmering railway, Lower Austria and Styria
- Belgium – Sölden, Tyrol
- Bulgaria – Admont Abbey, Styria
- Croatia – Pyramidenkogel, Styria and Bodental, Carinthia
- Cyprus – Lake Neusiedl, Burgenland
- Czechia – Hoher Dachstein, Upper Austria and Styria
- Denmark – Steyr, Upper Austria
- Estonia – Haus des Meeres, Vienna
- Finland – Warmbad-Judendorf, Villach, Carinthia
- France – Schönbrunn Palace, Vienna
- Georgia – Graz, Styria
- Germany – Salzburg, Salzburg
- Greece – Reutte, Tyrol
- Israel – Bregenzerwald, Vorarlberg
- Italy – Wachau, Lower Austria
- Latvia – Hallstatt, Upper Austria
- Lithuania – Grüner See, Styria
- Luxembourg – Bad Loipersdorf, Burgenland
- Malta – Hofburg Palace, Vienna
- Moldova – Prater, Vienna
- Montenegro – Lorüns and Hittisau, Vorarlberg
- Norway – Kunsthistorisches Museum, Vienna
- Poland – Burgruine Taggenbrunn, Carinthia
- Portugal – Tyrolean Festival, Erl, Tyrol
- Romania – Liaunig Museum, Neuhaus, Carinthia
- San Marino – Danube-Auen National Park, Vienna and Lower Austria
- Serbia – Traunsee, Upper Austria
- Sweden – Linz, Upper Austria
- Switzerland – Innsbruck, Tyrol
- Ukraine – Belvedere, Vienna
- United Kingdom – Lech river and Zürs, Vorarlberg

=== Presenters ===
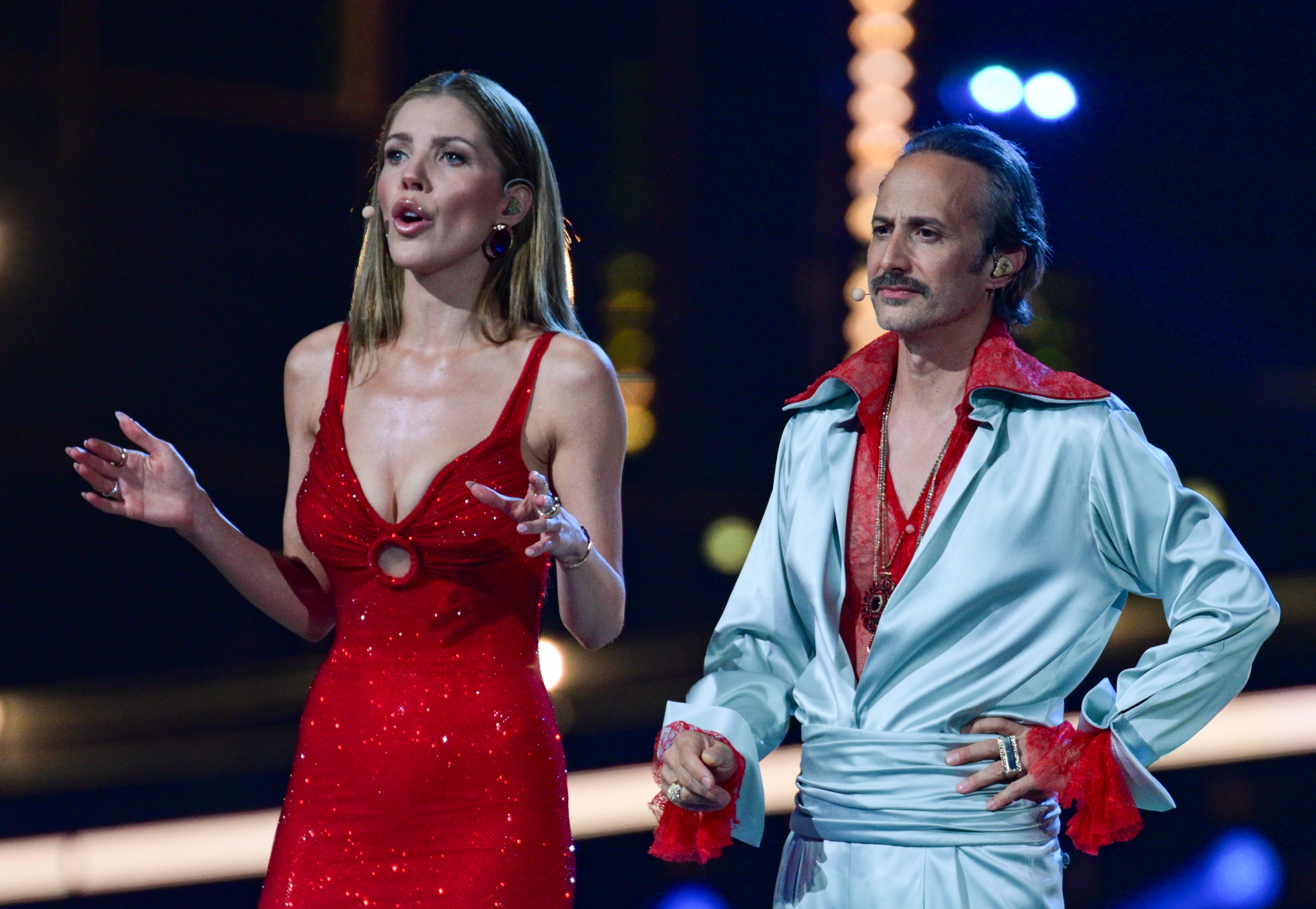
Victoria Swarovski and Michael Ostrowski, presenters of the 2026 contest

The contest was presented by the Austrian entertainers Victoria Swarovski and Michael Ostrowski, while FM4 presenter Emily Busvine hosted the green room. The "Turquoise Carpet" and opening ceremony events were hosted by Tina Ritschl and Philipp Maschl.

=== Semi-final allocation draw ===
Results of the semi-final allocation draw: Participating countries in the first semi-final Pre-qualified for the final but also voting in the first semi-final Participating countries in the second semi-final Pre-qualified for the final but also voting in the second semi-final

The draw to determine the participating countries' semi-finals took place on 12 January 2026 at 19:00 CET, at the Vienna City Hall. The thirty semi-finalists were divided over five pots, based on historical voting patterns, with the purpose of reducing the chance of "bloc voting" and increasing suspense in the semi-finals. The draw also determined which semi-final each of the five automatic qualifiers – host country Austria and the "Big Four" countries (France, Germany, Italy, and the United Kingdom) – would vote in, be required to broadcast, and perform its entry in a non-competitive capacity. The ceremony was hosted by Alexandra Wachter and Cesár Sampson, and was preceded by the passing of a "friendship gift" from Conradin Cramer, the president of the Basel-Stadt government representing the previous host city Basel, to Michael Ludwig, the mayor and governor of Vienna.

Pot 1	Pot 2	Pot 3	Pot 4	Pot 5
Albania; Bulgaria; Croatia; Montenegro; Serbia; Switzerland	Australia; Denmark; Estonia; Finland; Norway; Sweden	Armenia; Azerbaijan; Georgia; Israel; Poland; Ukraine	Belgium; Czechia; Luxembourg; Moldova; Portugal; Romania	Cyprus; Greece; Latvia; Lithuania; Malta; San Marino

== Contest overview ==
=== Semi-final 1 ===
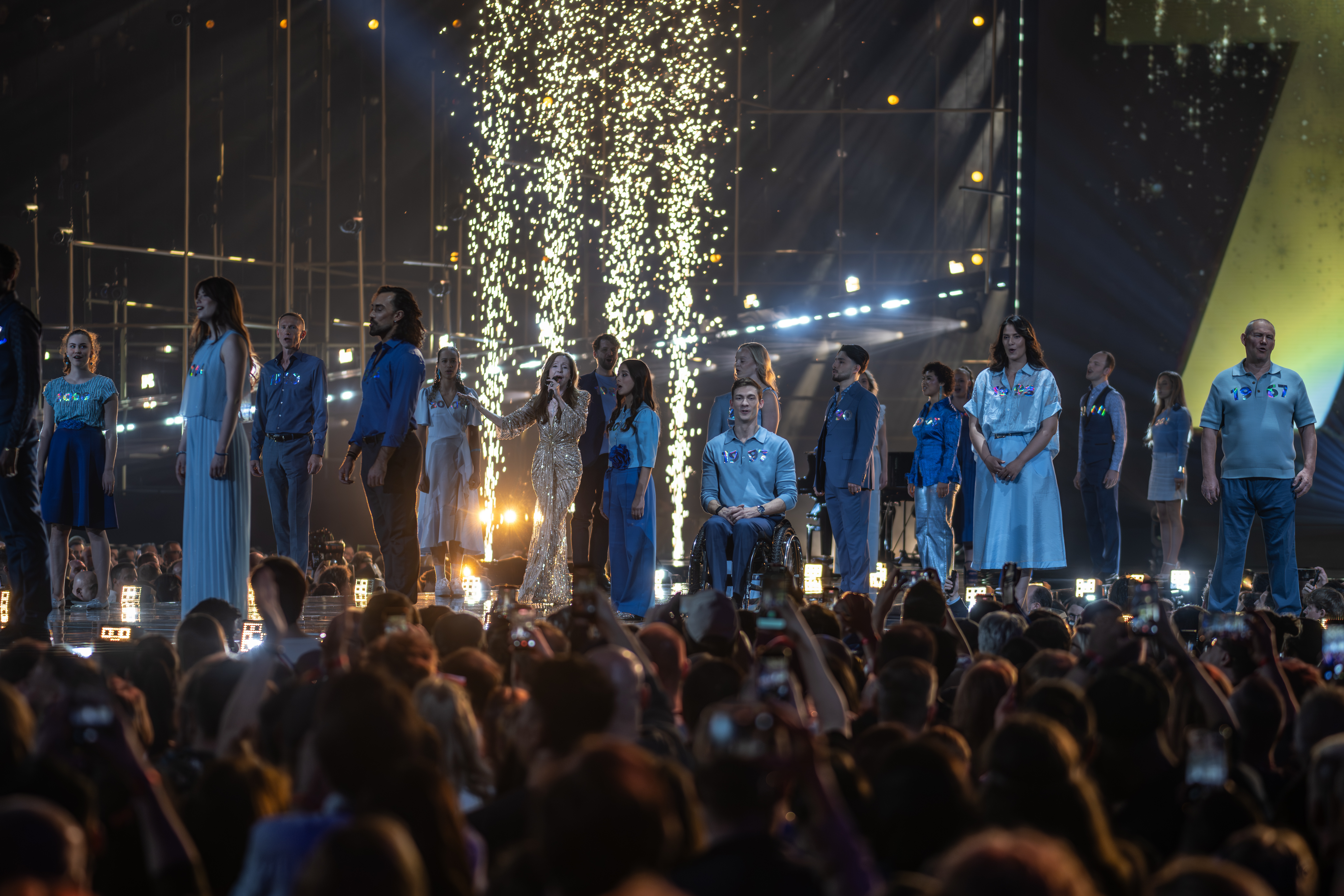
Vicky Leandros opened the first semi-final with "L'amour est bleu", her entry for Luxembourg in 1967, backed by a 70-member choir.

The first semi-final took place on 12 May 2026 at 21:00 CEST. Fifteen countries competed in this semi-final. Those countries plus Germany and Italy, as well as non-participating countries under an aggregated "Rest of the World" online vote, voted in this semi-final. The running order (R/O) was determined by the contest producers and made public on 2 April. In addition to the competing entries, Italy and Germany performed their entries during the show, appearing on stage after the entries from Georgia and Israel, respectively. Israel was awarded the most points in the semi-final, and qualified for the final alongside, in order of points total, Poland, Finland, Moldova, Serbia, Croatia, Greece, Lithuania, Sweden, and Belgium. The countries that failed to reach the final were Estonia, Portugal, Montenegro, San Marino, and Georgia.

This semi-final was opened by Vicky Leandros performing her entry for Luxembourg in 1967, "L'amour est bleu", backed by a 70-member choir. The interval acts were "Welcome to the Funfair", a performance by the acrobatic show group Zurcaroh centering on the history of the Bohemian Prater, Austria's oldest amusement park; and "Opposites", a musical number performed by presenters Victoria Swarovski and Michael Ostrowski which highlights "how to distinguish Austria from Australia", with an appearance by Go-Jo, who had represented Australia in 2025. (Note: Attributed to multiple references:)

Qualifiers

First semi-final of the Eurovision Song Contest 2026
R/O	Country	Artist	Song	Points	Place
1	Moldova	Satoshi	"Viva, Moldova!"	208	4
2	Sweden	Felicia	"My System"	96	9
3	Croatia	Lelek	"Andromeda"	175	6
4	Greece	Akylas	"Ferto"	159	7
5	Portugal	Bandidos do Cante	"Rosa"	74	12
6	Georgia	Bzikebi	"On Replay"	5	15
7	Finland	Linda Lampenius and Pete Parkkonen	"Liekinheitin"	227	3
8	Montenegro	Tamara Živković	"Nova zora"	71	13
9	Estonia	Vanilla Ninja	"Too Epic to Be True"	79	11
10	Israel	Noam Bettan	"Michelle"	269	1
11	Belgium	Essyla	"Dancing on the Ice"	91	10
12	Lithuania	Lion Ceccah	"Sólo quiero más"	101	8
13	San Marino	Senhit	"Superstar"	41	14
14	Poland	Alicja	"Pray"	247	2
15	Serbia	Lavina	"Kraj mene"	187	5

=== Semi-final 2 ===
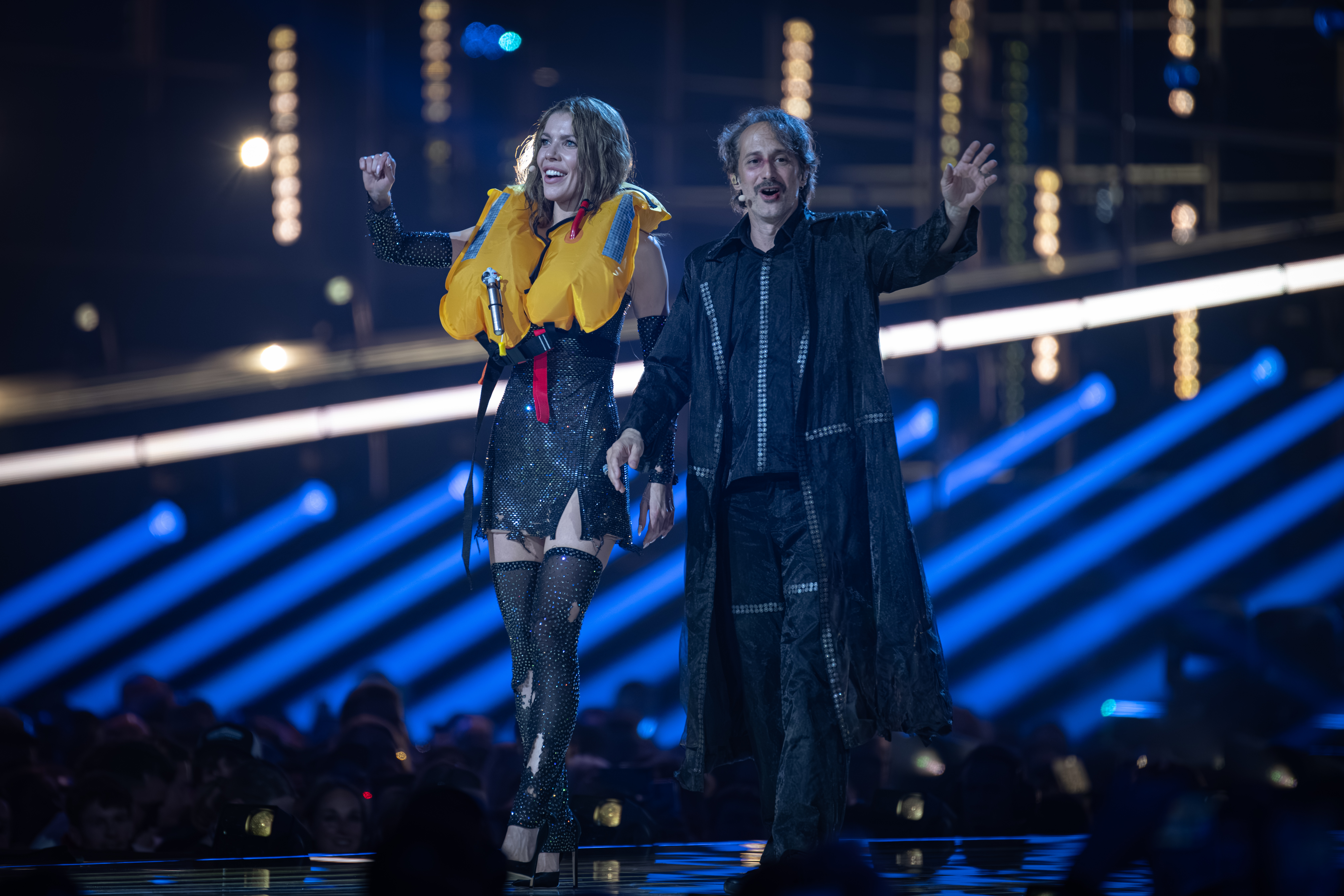
Presenters Victoria Swarovski and Michael Ostrowski opened the second semi-final with a skit parodying "Wasted Love", the winning song in 2025.

The second semi-final took place on 14 May 2026 at 21:00 CEST. Fifteen countries competed in this semi-final. Those countries plus Austria, France and the United Kingdom, as well as non-participating countries under an aggregated "Rest of the World" online vote, voted in this semi-final. The running order (R/O) was determined by the contest producers and made public on 2 April. In addition to the competing entries, France, Austria, and the United Kingdom performed their entries during the show, appearing on stage after the entries from Czechia, Cyprus, and Ukraine, respectively. Bulgaria was awarded the most points in the semi-final, and qualified for the final alongside, in order of points total, Romania, Australia, Norway, Denmark, Ukraine, Albania, Malta, Czechia, and Cyprus. The countries that failed to reach the final were Switzerland, Luxembourg, Latvia, Armenia, and Azerbaijan.

This semi-final was opened by a pre-recorded segment in which the presenters Victoria Swarovski and Michael Ostrowski performed the 2025 winning song "Wasted Love" in a "self-deprecating" manner, while the interval acts included the presenters performing "I'm So Excited" and JJ performing his new single "Unknown". (Note: Attributed to multiple references:)

Qualifiers

Second semi-final of the Eurovision Song Contest 2026
R/O	Country	Artist	Song	Points	Place
1	Bulgaria	Dara	"Bangaranga"	278	1
2	Azerbaijan	Jiva	"Just Go"	2	15
3	Romania	Alexandra Căpitănescu	"Choke Me"	234	2
4	Luxembourg	Eva Marija	"Mother Nature"	60	12
5	Czechia	Daniel Zizka	"Crossroads"	142	9
6	Armenia	Simón	"Paloma Rumba"	49	14
7	Switzerland	Veronica Fusaro	"Alice"	108	11
8	Cyprus	Antigoni	"Jalla"	122	10
9	Latvia	Atvara	"Ēnā"	49	13
10	Denmark	Søren Torpegaard Lund	"Før vi går hjem"	199	5
11	Australia	Delta Goodrem	"Eclipse"	222	3
12	Ukraine	Leléka	"Ridnym"	174	6
13	Albania	Alis	"Nân"	158	7
14	Malta	Aidan	"Bella"	143	8
15	Norway	Jonas Lovv	"Ya Ya Ya"	206	4

=== Final ===
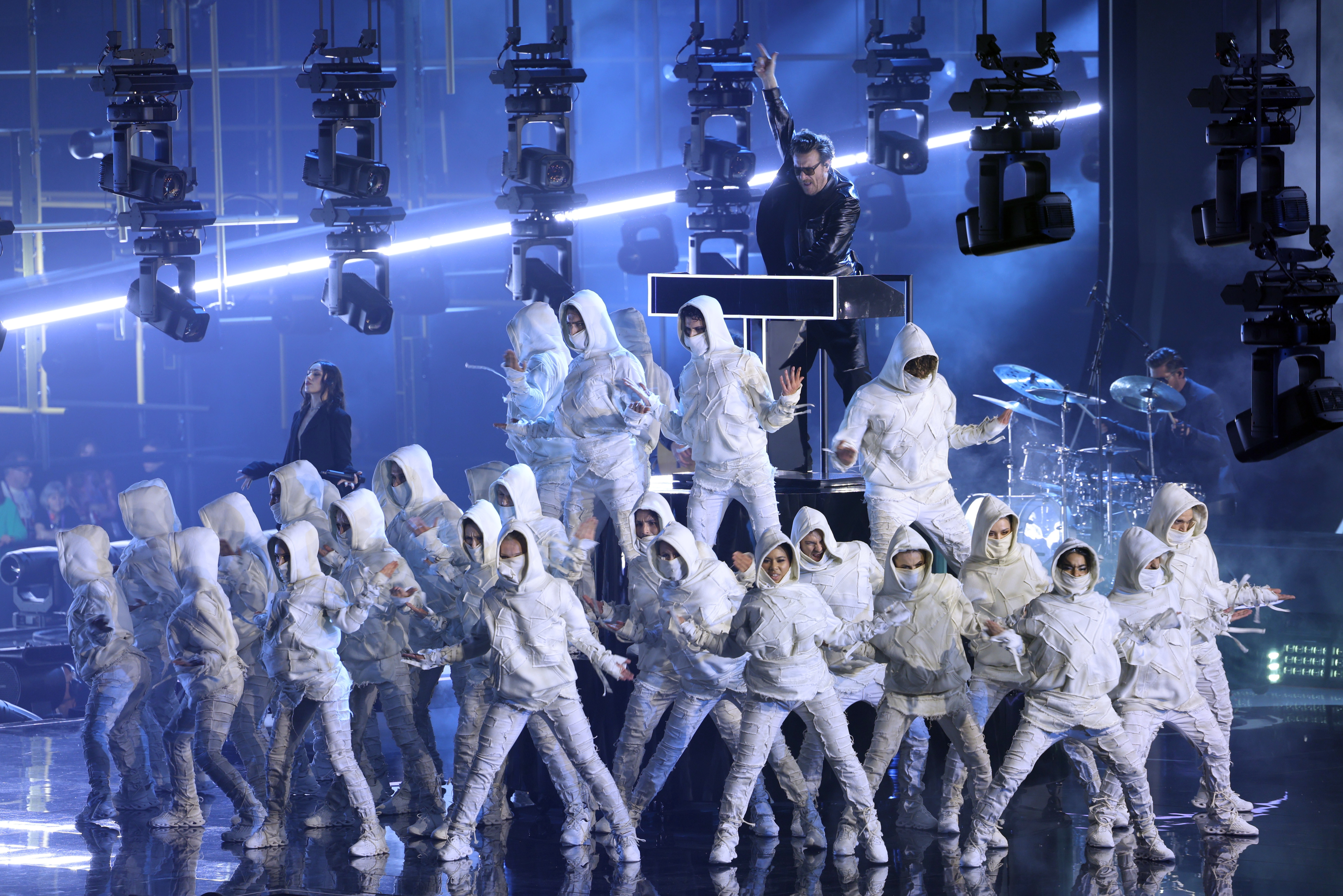
Parov Stelar performed as an interval act in the final.

The final took place on 16 May 2026 at 21:00 CEST and featured 25 competing countries. All 35 participating countries with jury and televote, as well as non-participating countries under an aggregated "Rest of the World" online vote, voted in the final. The running order (R/O) of the host nation was determined by a random draw on 17 March during the annual meeting of heads of the participating delegations, while the running order for the remaining finalists was determined by the contest producers following the second semi-final.

A notable technical issue occurred midway through Czechia's performance, with the screen showing stripes and the image freezing for a few seconds. The Czech delegation subsequently filed a request for a repeat performance, but the EBU described the incident as a minor technical problem and therefore did not permit a rerun.

Bulgaria won the contest with the song "Bangaranga", performed by Dara and written by her along with Anne Judith Wik, Cristian Tarcea, and Dimitris Kontopoulos. Bulgaria won both the jury vote and televote, the first entry to do so since Portugal in 2017, finishing with 516 points. It was the country's first win in the contest following 14 prior participations. Israel, Romania, Australia, Italy, Finland, Denmark, Moldova, Ukraine, and Greece completed the top ten; by finishing third, Romania received its highest points total in history and equalled its best placements from 2005 and 2010. Belgium, Lithuania, Germany, Austria, and the United Kingdom occupied the bottom five positions, with Belgium, Germany, and the United Kingdom receiving no points from the televote.

The final was opened by the flag parade, introducing all twenty-five finalists, accompanied by JJ performing the Queen of the Night aria, his new single "Unknown", and his winning song in 2025, "Wasted Love", backed by the Vienna Radio Symphony Orchestra under the conduction of Martin Gellner. The interval acts included, in order of appearance, former participants Erika Vikman (Finland 2025), Lordi (Finland 2006), Max Mutzke (Germany 2004), Alexander Rybak (Norway 2009 and 2018), Kristian Kostov (Bulgaria 2017), Verka Serduchka (Ukraine 2007), Miriana Conte (Malta 2025), and Ruslana (Ukraine 2004) performing a medley of past entries to celebrate the contest's seventieth anniversary; (Note: Namely, in order of appearance: "Merci, Chérie", "All Kinds of Everything", "Ich komme", "Espresso Macchiato", "Cha Cha Cha", "Rim Tim Tagi Dim", "Papa Pingouin", "Arcade", "Ne partez pas sans moi", "Dancing Lasha Tumbai", "Puppet on a String", "Serving", "Dschinghis Khan", "Save Your Kisses for Me", "Mon amour", "Euphoria", "Congratulations", "Fairytale", "Waterloo", and "Nel blu, dipinto di blu". "Espresso Macchiato" and "Nel blu, dipinto di blu" were later cut from video-on-demand replays of the show.) Parov Stelar performing his new single "Black Lilies" with uncredited vocals by Elena Karafizi and Lee Anduze; and Cesár Sampson (Austria 2018) performing "Vienna". (Note: Attributed to multiple references:)

"Bangaranga" was the only entry of the 2026 contest to enter the Billboard Global 200 and Billboard Global Excl. US, at numbers 90 and 38, respectively, on the charts dated 30 May 2026.

Winner

Final of the Eurovision Song Contest 2026
R/O	Country	Artist	Song	Points	Place
1	Denmark	Søren Torpegaard Lund	"Før vi går hjem"	243	7
2	Germany	Sarah Engels	"Fire"	12	23
3	Israel	Noam Bettan	"Michelle"	343	2
4	Belgium	Essyla	"Dancing on the Ice"	36	21
5	Albania	Alis	"Nân"	145	13
6	Greece	Akylas	"Ferto"	220	10
7	Ukraine	Leléka	"Ridnym"	221	9
8	Australia	Delta Goodrem	"Eclipse"	287	4
9	Serbia	Lavina	"Kraj mene"	90	17
10	Malta	Aidan	"Bella"	89	18
11	Czechia	Daniel Zizka	"Crossroads"	113	16
12	Bulgaria	Dara	"Bangaranga"	516	1
13	Croatia	Lelek	"Andromeda"	124	15
14	United Kingdom	Look Mum No Computer	"Eins, Zwei, Drei"	1	25
15	France	Monroe	"Regarde!"	158	11
16	Moldova	Satoshi	"Viva, Moldova!"	226	8
17	Finland	Linda Lampenius and Pete Parkkonen	"Liekinheitin"	279	6
18	Poland	Alicja	"Pray"	150	12
19	Lithuania	Lion Ceccah	"Sólo quiero más"	22	22
20	Sweden	Felicia	"My System"	51	20
21	Cyprus	Antigoni	"Jalla"	75	19
22	Italy	Sal Da Vinci	"Per sempre sì"	281	5
23	Norway	Jonas Lovv	"Ya Ya Ya"	134	14
24	Romania	Alexandra Căpitănescu	"Choke Me"	296	3
25	Austria	Cosmó	"Tanzschein"	6	24

==== Spokespersons ====
The 12-point score from each country's national jury was revealed by the spokespersons in the following order:

1. Switzerland – Livio Chistell
2. Malta – Mya Scicluna
3. Ukraine – Daniil Leshchynskyi
4. Luxembourg – Hana Sofia Lopes
5. Bulgaria – Vladimira Ilieva
6. Azerbaijan – Sabina Babayeva
7. San Marino – Kelly Joyce
8. Estonia – Getter Jaani
9. Israel – Lior Suchard
10. Australia – Dami Im
11. Germany – Wavvyboi
12. Belgium – Sandra Kim
13. Portugal – Victoria Nicole
14. Sweden – Jakob Norrgård
15. Albania – Andri Xhahu
16. Cyprus – Loukas Hamatsos
17. Georgia – Mariam Shengelia
18. Montenegro – Nina Žižić
19. Armenia – Parg
20. Poland – Aleksandra Budka
21. Greece – Klavdia
22. Czechia – Dominika Hašková
23. Denmark – Sissal
24. France – Magali Ripoll
25. Norway – Elisabeth Andreassen
26. Italy – Mariasole Pollio
27. Finland – Jaana Pelkonen
28. United Kingdom – La Voix
29. Latvia – Aurēlija Rancāne
30. Serbia – Kristina Radenković
31. Moldova – Margarita Druță
32. Croatia – Doris Pinčić
33. Lithuania – Lukas Radzevičius
34. Romania – Eda Marcus
35. Austria – Philipp Hansa

== Detailed voting results ==
=== Semi-final 1 ===
Qualifiers

Split results of semi-final 1
Place	Combined		Jury		Televoting	
Place	Country	Points	Country	Points	Country	Points
1	Israel	269	Poland	137	Israel	163
2	Poland	247	Finland	127	Moldova	146
3	Finland	227	Israel	106	Serbia	131
4	Moldova	208	Greece	88	Poland	110
5	Serbia	187	Croatia	85	Finland	100
6	Croatia	175	Belgium	81	Croatia	90
7	Greece	159	Sweden	79	Greece	71
8	Lithuania	101	Moldova	62	Lithuania	55
9	Sweden	96	Serbia	56	Estonia	46
10	Belgium	91	Lithuania	46	Montenegro	45
11	Estonia	79	Portugal	39	Portugal	35
12	Portugal	74	Estonia	33	San Marino	23
13	Montenegro	71	Montenegro	26	Sweden	17
14	San Marino	41	San Marino	18	Belgium	10
15	Georgia	5	Georgia	3	Georgia	2

The ten qualifiers from the first semi-final were determined by televoting (50%) and seven-member juries (50%). All fifteen countries competing in the first semi-final voted, alongside Germany and Italy, and the aggregated Rest of the World vote. The ten qualifying countries were announced in a random order, with the full results being published after the final.

Detailed jury voting results of semi-final 1
Voting procedure used: 100% televoting; 100% jury vote		Total score	Jury score	Televoting score	Jury vote																
Voting procedure used: 100% televoting; 100% jury vote		Total score	Jury score	Televoting score	Moldova	Sweden	Croatia	Greece	Portugal	Georgia	Finland	Montenegro	Estonia	Israel	Belgium	Lithuania	San Marino	Poland	Serbia	Germany	Italy
Contestants	Moldova	208	62	146		6	6	5		7	3	4		5	1	6	5	1	7	1	5
Contestants	Sweden	96	79	17	1		5	1	5	8	5	5	5	3	10	8	4	3		6	10
Contestants	Croatia	175	85	90	7	8		6	8	3	10	10	6		7	1	6	2	2	8	1
Contestants	Greece	159	88	71	8	5	4		1	10	4	7	7	7	2	2	12	4	10	5	
Contestants	Portugal	74	39	35		3					1	2	2	4	5	7		8	5		2
Contestants	Georgia	5	3	2										1			2				
Contestants	Finland	227	127	100	4	12	10	7	12	12		8	12	10	6	5	8	5	3	10	3
Contestants	Montenegro	71	26	45			1	8	3		2						7		1	4	
Contestants	Estonia	79	33	46	3	2		3						6	3	4			6		6
Contestants	Israel	269	106	163	12	4	12	4	2	5	6		4		8	10	10	10	12	7	
Contestants	Belgium	91	81	10	6	7	2		4		12	1	8	8		3		12	4	2	12
Contestants	Lithuania	101	46	55	2		3	2	7	1	8		3		4			6		3	7
Contestants	San Marino	41	18	23		1				4		6	1	2							4
Contestants	Poland	247	137	110	10	10	8	12	10	2	7	3	10	12	12	12	1		8	12	8
Contestants	Serbia	187	56	131	5		7	10	6	6		12					3	7			

Detailed televoting results of semi-final 1
Voting procedure used: 100% televoting; 100% jury vote		Total score	Jury score	Televoting score	Televote																	
Voting procedure used: 100% televoting; 100% jury vote		Total score	Jury score	Televoting score	Moldova	Sweden	Croatia	Greece	Portugal	Georgia	Finland	Montenegro	Estonia	Israel	Belgium	Lithuania	San Marino	Poland	Serbia	Germany	Italy	Rest of the World
Contestants	Moldova	208	62	146		1	8	8	10	10	4	7	7	12	12	7	10	12	7	7	12	12
Contestants	Sweden	96	79	17	4		1				7		2			1		1	1			
Contestants	Croatia	175	85	90	7	4		5	5	1	6	10	3	7	5	3	3	4	12	6	5	4
Contestants	Greece	159	88	71	6	3	4		3	7		3	1	10	7	2	1	2	8	8	3	3
Contestants	Portugal	74	39	35		2	5				3	2	8		4	4	5			2		
Contestants	Georgia	5	3	2				2														
Contestants	Finland	227	127	100	5	12	3	3	7	4		4	12	5	6	6	8	7	5	4	4	5
Contestants	Montenegro	71	26	45			10	4	4	5				2				6	10		2	2
Contestants	Estonia	79	33	46	2	7	2		1		12			3	1	8	4	3	2	1		
Contestants	Israel	269	106	163	12	10	6	10	12	12	10	8	10		10	5	12	8	6	12	10	10
Contestants	Belgium	91	81	10	1					2	1	1		4								1
Contestants	Lithuania	101	46	55	3	5		1	2	6	5	5	6		2		2	5	3	3	1	6
Contestants	San Marino	41	18	23				7						8							8	
Contestants	Poland	247	137	110	10	8	7	6	6	3	2	6	4	6	8	10	6		4	10	6	8
Contestants	Serbia	187	56	131	8	6	12	12	8	8	8	12	5	1	3	12	7	10		5	7	7

==== 12 points ====
Below is a summary of all 12 points received in the first semi-final. In the jury vote, Poland received the maximum score of 12 points from five countries, Finland received 12 points from four countries, Belgium and Israel received 12 points from three countries, while Greece and Serbia were each awarded one set of 12 points. In the public vote, Israel received the maximum score of 12 points from five countries, Moldova and Serbia received 12 points from four countries (plus the aggregated Rest of the World vote for Moldova). Finland received two sets of 12 points, while Croatia and Estonia were each awarded one set of 12 points.

12 points awarded by juries
#	Recipient	Countries giving 12 points
5	Poland	Belgium, Germany, Greece, Israel, Lithuania
4	Finland	Estonia, Georgia, Portugal, Sweden
3	Belgium	Finland, Italy, Poland
3	Israel	Croatia, Moldova, Serbia
1	Greece	San Marino
1	Serbia	Montenegro

12 points awarded by televoting
#	Recipient	Countries giving 12 points
5	Israel	Georgia, Germany, Moldova, Portugal, San Marino
5	Moldova	Belgium, Israel, Italy, Poland, Rest of the World
4	Serbia	Croatia, Greece, Lithuania, Montenegro
2	Finland	Estonia, Sweden
1	Croatia	Serbia
1	Estonia	Finland

=== Semi-final 2 ===
Qualifiers

Split results of semi-final 2
Place	Combined		Jury		Televoting	
Place	Country	Points	Country	Points	Country	Points
1	Bulgaria	278	Australia	137	Bulgaria	184
2	Romania	234	Denmark	124	Romania	147
3	Australia	222	Norway	109	Albania	113
4	Norway	206	Czechia	108	Ukraine	99
5	Denmark	199	Bulgaria	94	Norway	97
6	Ukraine	174	Romania	87	Australia	85
7	Albania	158	Malta	84	Denmark	75
8	Malta	143	Ukraine	75	Cyprus	75
9	Czechia	142	Switzerland	48	Switzerland	60
10	Cyprus	122	Cyprus	47	Malta	59
11	Switzerland	108	Albania	45	Luxembourg	34
12	Luxembourg	60	Armenia	30	Czechia	34
13	Latvia	49	Latvia	28	Latvia	21
14	Armenia	49	Luxembourg	26	Armenia	19
15	Azerbaijan	2	Azerbaijan	2	Azerbaijan	0

The ten qualifiers from the second semi-final were determined by televoting (50%) and seven-member juries (50%). All fifteen countries competing in the second semi-final voted, alongside Austria, France, and the United Kingdom, plus the aggregated Rest of the World vote. The ten qualifying countries were revealed in no particular order, with the full results being published after the final.

Detailed jury voting results of semi-final 2
Voting procedure used: 100% televoting; 100% jury vote		Total score	Jury score	Televoting score	Jury vote																	
Voting procedure used: 100% televoting; 100% jury vote		Total score	Jury score	Televoting score	Bulgaria	Azerbaijan	Romania	Luxembourg	Czechia	Armenia	Switzerland	Cyprus	Latvia	Denmark	Australia	Ukraine	Albania	Malta	Norway	Austria	France	United Kingdom
Contestants	Bulgaria	278	94	184		4	3	5	1	8	3	8	5	12	10		6	10	6	2	6	5
Contestants	Azerbaijan	2	2	0	2																	
Contestants	Romania	234	87	147		5		12	10	4	4	1	4	5	6	6	2	7	8	6	3	4
Contestants	Luxembourg	60	26	34			2						8	7	2	7						
Contestants	Czechia	142	108	34		1	12	3		6	12	5	12	8	5	10	10	2	7	5	2	8
Contestants	Armenia	49	30	19	4								1	3	12	1	4		2		1	2
Contestants	Switzerland	108	48	60	1		8	1	8	3		2	2		3	8		1		7	4	
Contestants	Cyprus	122	47	75	10	6				5				1	4		8	8	5			
Contestants	Latvia	49	28	21		3	4		5		6			4		3						3
Contestants	Denmark	199	124	75	6	2	7	8	7	10	5	6	10		8	4	7	6	12	8	8	10
Contestants	Australia	222	137	85	8	10	10	10	6	12	7	7	3	10		5	3	12	10	10	7	7
Contestants	Ukraine	174	75	99	5	8	6	4	3		10	3	7	2			1	4	3	3	10	6
Contestants	Albania	158	45	113	3	12		2	4	1	1	12						5	4	1		
Contestants	Malta	143	84	59	12	7	1	6	2	2	2	10		6	1	12	12		1	4	5	1
Contestants	Norway	206	109	97	7		5	7	12	7	8	4	6		7	2	5	3		12	12	12

Detailed televoting results of semi-final 2
Voting procedure used: 100% televoting; 100% jury vote		Total score	Jury score	Televoting score	Televote																		
Voting procedure used: 100% televoting; 100% jury vote		Total score	Jury score	Televoting score	Bulgaria	Azerbaijan	Romania	Luxembourg	Czechia	Armenia	Switzerland	Cyprus	Latvia	Denmark	Australia	Ukraine	Albania	Malta	Norway	Austria	France	United Kingdom	Rest of the World
Contestants	Bulgaria	278	94	184		10	10	12	8	10	12	12	6	10	8	4	12	12	10	12	12	12	12
Contestants	Azerbaijan	2	2	0																			
Contestants	Romania	234	87	147	8	7		10	12	6	7	10	8	5	7	12	3	5	7	10	10	10	10
Contestants	Luxembourg	60	26	34	2				1		3	1	4	6		3		4		7	2	1	
Contestants	Czechia	142	108	34		4	6	2		5				3	3	5			2				4
Contestants	Armenia	49	30	19	5							4			4						6		
Contestants	Switzerland	108	48	60		8	7		5	7		2	7		5	8	2		1	4	1		3
Contestants	Cyprus	122	47	75	10	12	3	8		12	2			2	1		4	8				8	5
Contestants	Latvia	49	28	21		1		3		1	1						1	1	3		3	5	2
Contestants	Denmark	199	124	75	1	3	4	5	4	3	4		5		12	7	10	3	12	1			1
Contestants	Australia	222	137	85	3		1	1	3	4	8	8	2	7		1	7	10	5	8	4	7	6
Contestants	Ukraine	174	75	99	4	2	5	7	10		6	7	12	8			5	2	6	5	8	4	8
Contestants	Albania	158	45	113	12	6	12	6	6	8	10	5	1	4	2	6		7	8	3	7	3	7
Contestants	Malta	143	84	59	7	5	2	4	2	2		6	3	1	6	2	6		4	2	5	2	
Contestants	Norway	206	109	97	6		8		7		5	3	10	12	10	10	8	6		6		6	

==== 12 points ====
Below is a summary of all 12 points received in the second semi-final. In the jury vote, Norway received the maximum score of 12 points from four countries, Czechia and Malta received 12 points from three countries, Albania and Australia received 12 points from two countries, while Armenia, Bulgaria, Denmark, and Romania were each awarded one set of 12 points. In the public vote, Bulgaria received the maximum score of 12 points from eight countries, plus the aggregated rest of the world vote. Albania, Cyprus, Denmark, and Romania each received two sets of 12 points, while Norway and Ukraine were each awarded one set of 12 points.

12 points awarded by juries
#	Recipient	Countries giving 12 points
4	Norway	Austria, Czechia, France, United Kingdom
3	Czechia	Latvia, Romania, Switzerland
3	Malta	Albania, Bulgaria, Ukraine
2	Albania	Azerbaijan, Cyprus
2	Australia	Armenia, Malta
1	Armenia	Australia
1	Bulgaria	Denmark
1	Denmark	Norway
1	Romania	Luxembourg

12 points awarded by televoting
#	Recipient	Countries giving 12 points
9	Bulgaria	Albania, Austria, Cyprus, France, Luxembourg, Malta, Switzerland, United Kingdom, Rest of the World
2	Albania	Bulgaria, Romania
2	Cyprus	Armenia, Azerbaijan
2	Denmark	Australia, Norway
2	Romania	Czechia, Ukraine
1	Norway	Denmark
1	Ukraine	Latvia

=== Final ===
The results of the final were determined by televoting and jury voting in all thirty-five participating countries, plus the Rest of the World aggregate public vote. The jury points of each respective country were shown on screen, with the 12-point score revealed by the country's spokesperson. Following the completion of the jury vote, the televoting points were aggregated by the contest hosts in ascending order, starting from the country that received the fewest points from the jury.

Winner

Split results
Place	Combined		Jury		Televoting	
Place	Country	Points	Country	Points	Country	Points
1	Bulgaria	516	Bulgaria	204	Bulgaria	312
2	Israel	343	Australia	165 (Note: Despite finishing with the same number of points as Denmark, Australia is deemed to have finished 2nd in the jury voting due to receiving points from more countries.)	Romania	232
3	Romania	296	Denmark	165	Israel	220
4	Australia	287	France	144	Moldova	183
5	Italy	281	Finland	141	Ukraine	167
6	Finland	279	Italy	134	Greece	147 (Note: Despite finishing with the same number of points as Italy, Greece is deemed to have finished 6th in the televoting due to receiving points from more countries.)
7	Denmark	243	Poland	133	Italy	147
8	Moldova	226	Israel	123	Finland	138
9	Ukraine	221	Norway	115	Australia	122
10	Greece	220	Czechia	104	Albania	85
11	France	158	Malta	81	Denmark	78
12	Poland	150	Greece	73	Croatia	71
13	Albania	145	Romania	64	Serbia	52
14	Norway	134	Albania	60	Cyprus	34
15	Croatia	124	Ukraine	54	Norway	19
16	Czechia	113	Croatia	53	Poland	17
17	Serbia	90	Moldova	43	Sweden	16
18	Malta	89	Cyprus	41	France	14
19	Cyprus	75	Serbia	38	Lithuania	12
20	Sweden	51	Belgium	36	Czechia	9
21	Belgium	36	Sweden	35	Malta	8
22	Lithuania	22	Germany	12	Austria	5
23	Germany	12	Lithuania	10	Germany	0 (Note: Despite 3 countries finishing with 0 points, tiebreaking rules put Germany in 23rd place with the televote, Belgium 24th, and the United Kingdom 25th due to their running order positions.)
24	Austria	6	United Kingdom	1 (Note: Despite finishing with the same number of points as Austria, the United Kingdom is deemed to have finished 24th in the jury voting, having performed earlier in the running order.)	Belgium	0
25	United Kingdom	1	Austria	1	United Kingdom	0

Detailed jury voting results of the final of the Eurovision Song Contest 2026
Voting procedure used: 100% Televoting; 100% Jury vote		Total score	Jury vote score	Televoting score	Jury vote																																		
Voting procedure used: 100% Televoting; 100% Jury vote		Total score	Jury vote score	Televoting score	Switzerland	Malta	Ukraine	Luxembourg	Bulgaria	Azerbaijan	San Marino	Estonia	Israel	Australia	Germany	Belgium	Portugal	Sweden	Albania	Cyprus	Georgia	Montenegro	Armenia	Poland	Greece	Czechia	Denmark	France	Norway	Italy	Finland	United Kingdom	Latvia	Serbia	Moldova	Croatia	Lithuania	Romania	Austria
Contestants	Denmark	243	165	78	3			5	1		1	8	10	5	4		10	10	5	6			5			12		10	12		10	6	5	6		10	4	7	10
Contestants	Germany	12	12	0					2							2	4													4									
Contestants	Israel	343	123	220	2	4	10		7	4	4				3	1			8		6		7	12		2	7	4	1					4	10	5	8	6	8
Contestants	Belgium	36	36	0								2	2											6						12	4		10						
Contestants	Albania	145	60	85		6				6	5		1			3	12			8		10			1											8			
Contestants	Greece	220	73	147							6	3	5	2				4	2	12		6	3	8									1	12	8				1
Contestants	Ukraine	221	54	167	12					10							3							1				6		7		7	7					1	
Contestants	Australia	287	165	122	6	8	2	10	8				12		5	10		8	1	5			12	7	7	6	4	5	7		7	3		2	4	7		12	7
Contestants	Serbia	90	38	52						8												12			5			1								12			
Contestants	Malta	89	81	8			12	2	12	2	12								6	7	4					1		3		8		1		8				3	
Contestants	Czechia	113	104	9	10		7		4	1		1		7				7	7	2	1		4	4			5		2		2	8	12		5		2	8	5
Contestants	Bulgaria	516	204	312	4	12		8		5	8	7	8	12	7	4		5	3	10	3	5	10	10	6	4	12	7	3	3		10	4	7	7	4	12	4	
Contestants	Croatia	124	53	71				7		7		4			2		8	6				8			4						5							2	
Contestants	United Kingdom	1	1	0			1																																
Contestants	France	158	144	14	7	7	5	6						10	6	5	5	2	4	3	12		8		8	3	3		10		12	12	6		2	3	1		4
Contestants	Moldova	226	43	183			8		5				6									2			3					1	1			3		1	3	10	
Contestants	Finland	279	141	138		5	6	3			2	12	7	4	8	8	7	12		4	7	7	2			7	8	2	8			2	3			6	5		6
Contestants	Poland	150	133	17	8	1						5		8	12	12	6				2	1	1		10	5				6	6	5	8	1	12	2	10		12
Contestants	Lithuania	22	10	12																										2	8								
Contestants	Sweden	51	35	16											1							4					10		4	10							6		
Contestants	Cyprus	75	41	34		3			10		3			3							8				12		2												
Contestants	Italy	281	134	147		10	4		6	12	10	6	3	1	10	6		3	12	1	10	3		2			6	8	5		3			10	1				2
Contestants	Norway	134	115	19	5	2		4	3			10		6		7	2		10		5		6	3		10		12				4		5	6		7	5	3
Contestants	Romania	296	64	232	1		3	12		3	7		4				1	1						5	2	8	1		6	5			2		3				
Contestants	Austria	6	1	5				1																															

Detailed televoting results of the final of the Eurovision Song Contest 2026
Voting procedure used: 100% Televoting; 100% Jury vote		Total score	Jury vote score	Televoting score	Televote																																			
Voting procedure used: 100% Televoting; 100% Jury vote		Total score	Jury vote score	Televoting score	Switzerland	Malta	Ukraine	Luxembourg	Bulgaria	Azerbaijan	San Marino	Estonia	Israel	Australia	Germany	Belgium	Portugal	Sweden	Albania	Cyprus	Georgia	Montenegro	Armenia	Poland	Greece	Czechia	Denmark	France	Norway	Italy	Finland	United Kingdom	Latvia	Serbia	Moldova	Croatia	Lithuania	Romania	Austria	Rest of the World
Contestants	Denmark	243	165	78			7			7		2	6	3				10			4		6	3		1			12		8		3				6			
Contestants	Germany	12	12	0																																				
Contestants	Israel	343	123	220	12	7	5	1	5	12	3	1			12	8	12	7	10	8	10	4	7	2	5	5	2	12	5	8	12	10	4	4	8			6	7	6
Contestants	Belgium	36	36	0																																				
Contestants	Albania	145	60	85	7	6		3	8		1		1			2						10			8		1	4	3	7				1	5	8		5		5
Contestants	Greece	220	73	147	6	2		8	12		12	3	5	8	8	6		4	8	12	5	2	4			6		3		4		4	2	8	3	3		3	2	4
Contestants	Ukraine	221	54	167				4	7	4		8	4		2	5	10	5	7	4	12	5		12		12	7	6	2	6	4	2	5		10	1	7	4	4	8
Contestants	Australia	287	165	122	5	10				5	5	5	10			1	4	6	4	5	2	1	10	5	3		5		6	1		7		3		4	2	1	10	2
Contestants	Serbia	90	38	52		1	3												3		3	12		1		2					3				1	12	1	10		
Contestants	Malta	89	81	8					2	2				4																										
Contestants	Czechia	113	104	9			1			3													1	4																
Contestants	Bulgaria	516	204	312	8	8	4	12		10	10	7	12	12	10	12	6	8	6	10	6	7	12	7	10	10	12	7	8	5	7	12	7	10	6	7	12	8	12	12
Contestants	Croatia	124	53	71	2		8		4					7	7		1		2			8			1	4		1			2			12	2			2	8	
Contestants	United Kingdom	1	1	0																																				
Contestants	France	158	144	14				2					2	1			2			2			2		2				1											
Contestants	Moldova	226	43	183	1		12	6	3	1	2	10	8	5	3	7	8			6	8			8	4	8	3	10		12	1	6	8	5		6	5	12	5	10
Contestants	Finland	279	141	138	3	4	2	5		8	4	12		10		3	5	12	1	1	1		8	6		3	8	2	10	3		1	10	2	4	2	4		1	3
Contestants	Poland	150	133	17											4			2												2		5					3			1
Contestants	Lithuania	22	10	12																													12							
Contestants	Sweden	51	35	16																							6		4		6									
Contestants	Cyprus	75	41	34		3			6		7												3		12							3								
Contestants	Italy	281	134	147	10	12		7	1		8	6	7		6	4	3		12	3		6			7			5			5		1	6	7	10	8	7	6	
Contestants	Norway	134	115	19			6							2				1									10													
Contestants	Romania	296	64	232	4	5	10	10	10	6	6	4	3	6	1	10	7	3	5	7	7	3	5	10	6	7	4	8	7	10	10	8	6	7	12	5	10		3	7
Contestants	Austria	6	1	5											5																									

==== 12 points ====
Below is a summary of all the 12-point scores awarded in the final. In the jury vote, Bulgaria and Poland each received the maximum score from four countries, followed by Australia, France and Malta with three sets of 12 points apiece. Denmark, Finland, Greece, Italy and Serbia each received two sets of 12 points, while Albania, Belgium, Cyprus, Czechia, Israel, Norway, Romania and Ukraine were each awarded a single set. In the public vote, Bulgaria received the maximum 12 points from nine countries as well as from the aggregated Rest of the World vote. Israel followed with six sets of 12 points; Greece, Moldova and Ukraine received three sets each; Finland, Italy and Serbia received two each; and Croatia, Cyprus, Denmark, Lithuania and Romania received one each.

12 points awarded by juries in the final of the Eurovision Song Contest 2026
#	Recipient	Countries giving 12 points
4	Bulgaria	Australia, Denmark, Lithuania, Malta
4	Poland	Austria, Belgium, Germany, Moldova
3	Australia	Armenia, Israel, Romania
3	France	Finland, Georgia, United Kingdom
3	Malta	Bulgaria, San Marino, Ukraine
2	Denmark	Czechia, Norway
2	Finland	Estonia, Sweden
2	Greece	Cyprus, Serbia
2	Italy	Albania, Azerbaijan
2	Serbia	Croatia, Montenegro
1	Albania	Portugal
1	Belgium	Italy
1	Cyprus	Greece
1	Czechia	Latvia
1	Israel	Poland
1	Norway	France
1	Romania	Luxembourg
1	Ukraine	Switzerland

12 points awarded by televoting in the final of the Eurovision Song Contest 2026
#	Recipient	Countries giving 12 points
10	Bulgaria	Armenia, Australia, Austria, Belgium, Denmark, Israel, Luxembourg, Lithuania, Rest of the World, United Kingdom
6	Israel	Azerbaijan, Finland, France, Germany, Portugal, Switzerland
3	Greece	Bulgaria, Cyprus, San Marino
3	Moldova	Italy, Romania, Ukraine
3	Ukraine	Czechia, Georgia, Poland
2	Finland	Estonia, Sweden
2	Italy	Albania, Malta
2	Serbia	Croatia, Montenegro
1	Croatia	Serbia
1	Cyprus	Greece
1	Denmark	Norway
1	Lithuania	Latvia
1	Romania	Moldova

== Broadcasts ==
Participating broadcasters may provide on-site or remote commentators who offer insight and voting information to their local audience. Although they are required to, at minimum, show the final and semi-final in which their country votes, most broadcasters cover all three shows. Some non-participating broadcasters also air the contest. The Eurovision Song Contest YouTube channel provides international live streams with no commentary of all shows. The tables below detail the broadcasting plans and commentators for the countries that aired the contest. According to the EBU, in total 131 million people watched at least a minute of the television broadcasts, and votes were received from 148 countries, including the 35 competing countries.

Broadcasts and commentators in participating countries
Country	Broadcaster	Channel(s)	Show(s)	Commentator(s)	Ref.
Albania	RTSH	RTSH 1, RTSH Muzikë, Radio Tirana	All shows	Andri Xhahu	
Armenia	AMPTV	Armenia 1	All shows	Hrachuhi Utmazyan and Hamlet Arakelyan	
Australia	SBS		All shows	Courtney Act and Danny Estrin	
Austria	ORF	ORF 1	All shows	Andi Knoll	
Austria	ORF	FM4	Final	Jan Böhmermann and Olli Schulz	
Azerbaijan	İTV		All shows	Azer Suleymanli and Aysel Zahidgizi	
Belgium	VRT	VRT 1	All shows	Dutch: Peter Van de Veire	
Belgium	RTBF	La Une	SF1/Final	French: Jean-Louis Lahaye and Fanny Jandrain	
Belgium	RTBF	Tipik	SF2	French: Jean-Louis Lahaye and Fanny Jandrain	
Bulgaria	BNT	BNT 1	All shows	Elena Rosberg and Petko Kralev	
Croatia	HRT	HRT 1	All shows	Duško Ćurlić	
Croatia	HRT	HR 2	All shows	Zlatko Turkalj	
Cyprus	CyBC	RIK 1	All shows	Melina Karageorgiou	
Czechia	ČT	ČT2	Semi-finals	Ondřej Cikán	
Czechia	ČT	ČT1	Final	Ondřej Cikán	
Denmark	DR	DR1	All shows	Ole Tøpholm	
Estonia	ERR	ETV	All shows	Estonian: Marko Reikop	
Estonia	ERR	ETV+	All shows	Russian: Julia Kalenda and Aleksandr Hobotov	
Finland	Yle	Yle TV1	All shows	Finnish: Mikko Silvennoinen; Swedish: Eva Frantz and Johan Lindroos	
Finland	Yle	Yle Areena	SF1/Final	Inari Sámi: Mikkal Morottaja; Northern Sámi: Xia Torikka; Russian: Levan Tvaltvadze; Ukrainian: Galina Sergeyeva	
France	France Télévisions	France 4	Semi-finals	Stéphane Bern	
France	France Télévisions	France 2	Final	Stéphane Bern and Camille Cerf	
Germany	ARD/SWR	One	Semi-finals	Thorsten Schorn	
Germany	ARD/SWR	Das Erste	Final	Thorsten Schorn	
Germany	ARD/RBB	Radio Eins	Final	Amelie Ernst and Max Spallek	
Georgia	GPB	First Channel	All shows	Unknown	
Georgia	GPB	Georgian Radio	SF1	Unknown	
Greece	ERT	ERT1	All shows	Maria Kozakou and Giorgos Kapoutzidis	
Greece	ERT	Deftero Programma, Voice of Greece	All shows	Dimitris Meidanis	
Israel	IPBC	Kan 11	All shows	Asaf Liberman and Akiva Novick	
Italy	RAI	Rai 2	Semi-finals	Gabriele Corsi and Elettra Lamborghini	
Italy	RAI	Rai 1	Final	Gabriele Corsi and Elettra Lamborghini	
Italy	RAI	Rai Radio 2	All shows	Diletta Parlangeli and Matteo Osso	
Latvia	LSM	LTV1	Semi-finals	Toms Grēviņš	
Latvia	LSM	LTV1	Final	Toms Grēviņš and Katija Šēnberga	
Latvia	LSM	Latvijas Radio 5	All shows	Mārtiņš Pabērzis	
Lithuania	LRT	LRT TV, LRT Radijas	All shows	Ramūnas Zilnys	
Luxembourg	RTL	RTL Lëtzebuerg	All shows	Luxembourgish: Roger Saurfeld and Raoul Roos	
Luxembourg	RTL	RTL Today	SF2/Final	English: Meredith Moss and Melissa Dalton	
Luxembourg	RTL	RTL Infos	SF2/Final	French: Jérôme Didelot and Charlotte Gomez	
Malta	PBS	TVM	All shows	No commentary	
Moldova	TRM	Moldova 1, Radio Moldova, Radio Moldova Muzical	All shows	Elena Stegari and Radu Canțîr	
Montenegro	RTCG	TVCG 1	SF1/Final	Dražen Bauković and Tijana Mišković	
Montenegro	RTCG	TVCG 2	SF2	Dražen Bauković and Tijana Mišković	
Montenegro	RTCG	Radio 98	Final	Unknown	
Norway	NRK	NRK1	All shows	Marte Stokstad	
Norway	NRK	NRK P1	Final	Jonas Bergløv and Jon Marius Hyttebakk	
Poland	TVP	TVP1, TVP Polonia	All shows	Artur Orzech	
Portugal	RTP	RTP1, RTP Mundo	All shows (Note: Semi-final 2 broadcast delayed at 22:00 WEST (23:00 CEST))	Nuno Galopim and José Carlos Malato	
Romania	TVR	TVR 1	Semi-finals	Bogdan Stănescu and Ilinca Băcilă	
Romania	TVR	TVR 1	Final	Bogdan Stănescu and Kyrie Mendél	
San Marino	SMRTV	San Marino RTV	All shows	Anna Gaspari and Gigi Restivo	
Serbia	RTS	RTS 1, RTS Svet	All shows	Duška Vučinić	
Serbia	RTS	Radio Belgrade 1	SF1, Final	Unknown	
Sweden	SVT	SVT1	All shows	Edward af Sillén	
Sweden	SR	Sveriges Radio P4	All shows	Carolina Norén	
Switzerland	SRG SSR	RSI La 1	All shows	Italian: Ellis Cavallini and Gian-Andrea Costa	
Switzerland	SRG SSR	RTS 2	Semi-finals	French: Victoria Turrian and Nicolas Tanner	
Switzerland	SRG SSR	RTS 1	Final	French: Victoria Turrian and Nicolas Tanner	
Switzerland	SRG SSR	SRF zwei	Semi-finals	German: Sven Epiney	
Switzerland	SRG SSR	SRF 1	Final	German: Sven Epiney	
Ukraine	Suspilne	Suspilne Kultura	SF1	Timur Miroshnychenko and Vasyl Baidak	
Ukraine	Suspilne	Suspilne Kultura	SF2	Timur Miroshnychenko and Svitlana Tarabarova	
Ukraine	Suspilne	Suspilne Kultura	Final	Timur Miroshnychenko and Alyona Alyona	
United Kingdom	BBC	BBC One	Semi-finals	Rylan Clark and Angela Scanlon	
United Kingdom	BBC	BBC One	Final	Graham Norton	
United Kingdom	BBC	BBC Radio 2	Semi-finals	Sara Cox	
United Kingdom	BBC	BBC Radio 2	Final	Sara Cox and Rylan Clark	

Broadcasts and commentators in non-participating countries
Country	Broadcaster	Channel(s)	Show(s)	Commentator(s)	Ref.
Iceland	RÚV	RÚV 2	All shows	Guðrún Dís Emilsdóttir	
Iceland	RÚV	RÚV	Semi-finals (Note: Delayed broadcast at 19:40 UTC (21:40 CEST))	Guðrún Dís Emilsdóttir	
Kosovo	RTK	Unknown	All shows	Unknown	
Netherlands	NOS and NTR	NPO 1, BVN	All shows	Henry Schut and Jeroen Kijk in de Vegte	
North Macedonia	MRT	MRT 1, MRT 2 (Note: MRT 1 provided Macedonian language commentary, whilst MRT 2 provided commentary in the Albanian language.)	All shows	Eli Tanaskovska	
United States	NBC	Peacock	All shows	No commentary	

== Other awards ==
=== Marcel Bezençon Awards ===
The Marcel Bezençon Awards, organised since 2002 by Sweden's then-head of delegation and 1992 representative Christer Björkman, and winner of the 1984 contest Richard Herrey, honours songs in the contest's final. The awards are divided into three categories: the Artistic Award, the Composers Award, and the Media Award. The winners were revealed shortly before the Eurovision final on 16 May.

Category	Country	Song	Artist	Songwriter(s)
Composers Award	Denmark	"Før vi går hjem"	Søren Torpegaard Lund	Clara Sofie Fabricius; Søren Torpegaard Lund; Thomas Meilstrup; Valdemar Littauer Bendixen
Artistic Award	Bulgaria	"Bangaranga"	Dara	Anne Judith Wik; Cristian Tarcea; Darina Yotova; Dimitris Kontopoulos
Media Award	Australia	"Eclipse"	Delta Goodrem	Delta Goodrem; Ferras Alqaisi; Jonas Myrin; Michael Fatkin

=== OGAE ===
OGAE, an organisation of over forty Eurovision Song Contest fan clubs across Europe and beyond, conducts an annual voting poll first held in 2002 as the Marcel Bezençon Fan Award. After all votes were cast, the top-ranked entry in the 2026 poll was Finland's "Liekinheitin" performed by Linda Lampenius and Pete Parkkonen; the top five results are shown below.

Country	Song	Artist	Points
Finland	"Liekinheitin"	Linda Lampenius and Pete Parkkonen	459
Denmark	"Før vi går hjem"	Søren Torpegaard Lund	355
Australia	"Eclipse"	Delta Goodrem	289
Sweden	"My System"	Felicia	261
Cyprus	"Jalla"	Antigoni	247

== Official album ==
Cover art of the official album

Eurovision Song Contest: Vienna 2026 is the official compilation album of the contest, featuring all 35 entries. It was put together by the European Broadcasting Union and was released by Universal Music Group digitally on 17 April 2026, in CD format on 24 April 2026, and in vinyl format on 22 May 2026.

=== Charts ===
Chart performance for Eurovision Song Contest: Vienna 2026
Chart (2026)	Peak position
Australian Albums (ARIA)	50
Belgian Compilation Albums (Ultratop 50 Flanders)	1
Belgian Compilation Albums (Ultratop 50 Wallonia)	1
Croatian International Albums (HDU)	40
Dutch Compilation Albums (Compilation Top 30)	1
German Compilation Albums (Offizielle Top 100)	1
Greek Albums (IFPI)	5
Irish Compilation Albums (IRMA)	1
Norwegian Physical Albums (IFPI Norge)	7
Polish Physical Albums (ZPAV)	41
Swedish Physical Albums (Sverigetopplistan)	4
UK Compilation Albums (Official Charts)	1

== See also ==
- Junior Eurovision Song Contest 2026
- Eurovision Young Musicians 2026
- Eurovision Song Contest Asia 2026
