= San Marino in the Eurovision Song Contest 2026 =

- Eurovision Song Contest 2026
- Participating broadcaster: San Marino RTV (SMRTV)
- Country: San Marino
- Selection process: San Marino Song Contest 2026
- Selection date: 6 March 2026

Competing entry
- Song: "Superstar"
- Artist: Senhit
- Songwriters: Anderz Wrethov; George Alan O'Dowd; Julie Aagaard; John-Emil Johansson; Thomas Stengaard; Senhit Zadik Zadik

Placement
- Semi-final result: Failed to qualify (14th)

Participation chronology

San Marino was represented in the Eurovision Song Contest 2026 with the song "Superstar", written by Anderz Wrethov, George Alan O'Dowd, Julie Aagaard, John-Emil Johansson, Thomas Stengaard and Senhit Zadik Zadik, and performed by Senhit herself, with uncredited vocals from O'Dowd under his stage name Boy George. The Sammarinese participating broadcaster, San Marino RTV (SMRTV), organised the national final format San Marino Song Contest to select its entry for the contest. Over 800 candidate entries from 40 countries were submitted for consideration to the event, which after audition rounds, consisted of two 20-entrant semi-finals and a 21-entrant final round, airing in March 2026.

Promotion of the entry consisted of a tour of a selection of nations participating in the contest, including Albania, Azerbaijan, Georgia, Greece, Norway, the Netherlands and the United Kingdom. San Marino was drawn to compete in the first semi-final of the contest, which took place on 12 May 2026. Performed during the show at position 13 in the running order, "Superstar" placed 14th with 41 points, failing to qualify for the final.

== Background ==
Prior to the 2026 contest, San Marino RTV (SMRTV) had participated in the Eurovision Song Contest representing San Marino 15 times since its first entry in 2008. Its debut entry, "Complice" performed by Miodio, failed to qualify for the final and placed last in the first semi-final. SMRTV subsequently did not participate in both the 2009 and 2010 contests, citing financial difficulties. It returned in 2011 with "Stand By" by Italian singer Senit, which also failed to take the country to the final. From 2012 to 2014, SMRTV sent Valentina Monetta to the contest on three consecutive occasions. Monetta's first two entries failed to qualify to the final, however in 2014, she managed to bring San Marino to the final for the first time with "Maybe", which ultimately placed 24th. Following four consecutive non-qualifying years, San Marino qualified in 2019 with "Say Na Na Na" by Serhat and finished in 19th place. Senit, under her new stage name Senhit, was to return to represent the nation with "Freaky!" at the 2020 contest, however, following the contest's cancelation, SMRTV re-appointed Senhit for 2021. Her 2021 song, "Adrenalina", performed alongside American rapper Flo Rida, qualified for the final, where it placed 22nd. The Sammarinese entries from 2022 to 2024 all failed to qualify, until "Tutta l'Italia" by Gabry Ponte qualified in 2025, ultimately getting last place in the final.

As part of its duties as a participating broadcaster, SMRTV organises the selection of its entry in the Eurovision Song Contest and broadcasts the event in the country. SMRTV confirmed its intention to participate in the 2026 contest on 8 September 2025, announcing the following day that a second edition of San Marino Song Contest would be used to select its entry. The announcement also indicated that the Sammarinese Ministry of Tourism and Information and the company Media Evolution had reached an agreement to hold the selection process until at least 2028, that Denny Montesi, Media Evolution's chief executive officer would be taking over as Head of Delegation for San Marino from Alessandro Capicchioni, who held that role since the nation's first participation in 2008, and that four-time entrant Monetta would serve as ambassador for the contest.

== Before Eurovision ==
=== San Marino Song Contest 2026 ===
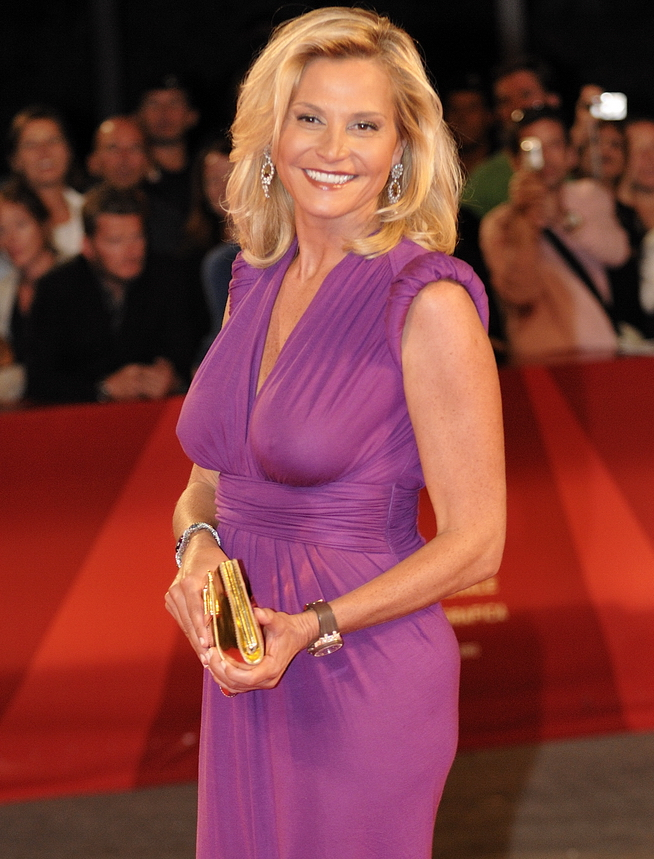
Simona Ventura hosted the final round of San Marino Song Contest 2026

San Marino Song Contest 2026 was the second edition of the national selection process organised by SMRTV and the company Media Evolution. Media Evolution was responsible for the early stages of the event, titled "Dreaming San Marino Song Contest", which consisted of auditions and casting of entries and the "Stage & Live Academy" phase to select 40 semi-finalists; SMRTV organised the two semi-finals and the final to select the ultimate entrant(s). Unlike the first edition in 2025, this year both the semi-finals and final were branded as San Marino Song Contest and the event was modeled after the Eurovision Song Contest itself. Each semi-final consisted of 20 entrants, with the top five from each proceeding to the final. The 21-participant final included the 10 finalists from the semi-finals, joined by 10 "Big Artists" as selected by SMRTV, and one wildcard reserved for singers holding Sammarinese citizenship.

The semi-finals of the contest took place on 2 and 3 March and the final on 6 March 2026 at the Nuovo de Dogana. The two semi-finals were hosted by Maddalena Corvaglia and Marco Carrara, while the final was hosted by Simona Ventura. The Artistic Director for the event was Massimo Bonelli and sets were designed by Marco Calzavara.

==== Participant selection ====
A submission window for interested artists and composers was opened in late October 2025 by Media Evolution, with a deadline initially set for 20 January 2026, subsequently extended to 25 January. Over 800 applicants from a total of 40 countries were received by the deadline. Live casting auditions were then held at San Marino Outlet Experience in Falciano in four rounds: the first on 20 November 2025, the second from 17 and 20 December 2025, the third on 7 January 2026, and the fourth from 27 January to 1st February 2026. Artists not residing in San Marino, Italy or neighbouring countries were able to attend the auditions online instead of attending in person. In addition to the regular selection process, SMRTV also confirmed a collaboration with Tour Music Fest, a Sammarinese music competition for emerging artists, to select a semi-finalist for a second year in a row.

The casting phase was used to select 240 acts to proceed to Media Evolution's "Stage & Live Academy" phase, which consisted of eight sessions of 30 candidates each. The casting phase was broadcast on SMRTV in 15-minute episodes from Monday through Saturday nights until the February "Stage & Live Academy" shows began broadcast in February 2026. At the end of the "Stage & Live Academy" phase, 40 entrants were selected to take part in the two 20-entrant semi-finals.

==== Semi-finals ====
The semi-finals aired on 4 and 5 March 2026 at the Teatro Nuovo in Dogana and were hosted by Maddalena Corvaglia and Marco Carrara. The artists who progressed to the semi-finals were publicly announced by SMRTV over two days: the acts for the first semi-final were revealed on 16 February 2026, followed by the artists competing on the second semi-final revealed the next day.

Ahead of the semi-finals two artists, Samuele di Nicolò and Park, withdrew their planned entries in the contest and were replaced Yume and Ciro Maddaluno, respectively, both of whom had been initially eliminated during the "Stage & Live Academy" phase. The ten finalists were selected by an international jury consisting of Massimo Bonelli (artistic director and record producer), Joseph Cauchi (Maltese executive producer), and Tomislav Štengl (head of the Croatian delegation to the Eurovision Song Contest).

Semi-final 1 – 4 March 2026
R/O	Artist	Country of Origin	Song	Result
1	Alien Cut feat. Tayma	Italy	"Ethernia"	Eliminated
2	Capabrò	Italy	"Lavorare fa schifo"	Eliminated
3	Daudia	Italy	"Talk About It"	Eliminated
4	ERISU	Italy	"Ghost of Ninive"	Eliminated
5	Giacomo Voli	Italy	"Figaro"	Eliminated
6	Lorenzo Bonfire	Italy	"Ode to Guilt"	Eliminated
7	Metiria	Italy	"Attention Seeker"	Eliminated
8	Mrtina	Italy	"My Insanity"	Eliminated
9	4Calamano	Italy	"Twilight"	Eliminated
10	Anna Smith	Switzerland	"Bruised"	Qualified
11	Myky	Italy	"Outta Tune"	Qualified
12	N'ice Cream	Italy	"Not the Winner"	Eliminated
13	Pellegrina Pibigas	Italy	"Il giorno che"	Qualified
14	Orphy	Czechia	"Rise Again"	Qualified
15	Sheila	Albania	"Zemra e tokës"	Eliminated
16	Star Guy	Norway	"Star Shadez"	Eliminated
17	Stefano	Italy	"Pesce rosso"	Eliminated
18	Yume	Italy	"Paura di amare"	Eliminated
19	Ryan Song	Netherlands	"Break the Cage"	Eliminated
20	Matias Ferreira	Spain	"Paura"	Qualified

Semi-final 2 – 5 March 2026
R/O	Artist	Country of Origin	Song	Result
1	Atwood	Italy	"Midnight Alibi"	Eliminated
2	Ciro Maddaluno	Italy	"Distratto"	Eliminated
3	Deva	Italy	"Mi fa male l'America"	Eliminated
4	Elysa	Estonia	"The Alchemist"	Eliminated
5	IlRed	Italy	"Playlist in loop"	Eliminated
6	Iuna	Italy	"Freedom Calling"	Qualified
7	Klem	Italy	"Ok respira"	Qualified
8	Luka	Slovenia	"Where It Ends"	Eliminated
9	Luka Basi	Slovenia	"Chicolo"	Qualified
10	Lupi Mannaggia	Italy	"Ignorantità"	Eliminated
11	Magdalena Tul	Poland	"I'll Be Around"	Qualified
12	Maraaya	Slovenia	"Alu Alu"	Eliminated
13	Marco Sbarbati	Italy	"Pretty Little Secret"	Eliminated
14	Maya Azucena	United States	"My Sin"	Qualified
15	Nicolò Deori	Italy	"Mi ucciderai per sempre"	Eliminated
16	NovaBlue	Italy	"Muoio di fame"	Eliminated
17	Paolo Martini	Italy	"Fase REM"	Eliminated
18	Sezina Kelsey	Netherlands	"You Raise Me High"	Eliminated
19	UtopiaTwins and Valerie	Italy	"Fake Smile"	Eliminated
20	Xannova Xan	United States	"Unbreakable"	Eliminated

==== Final ====
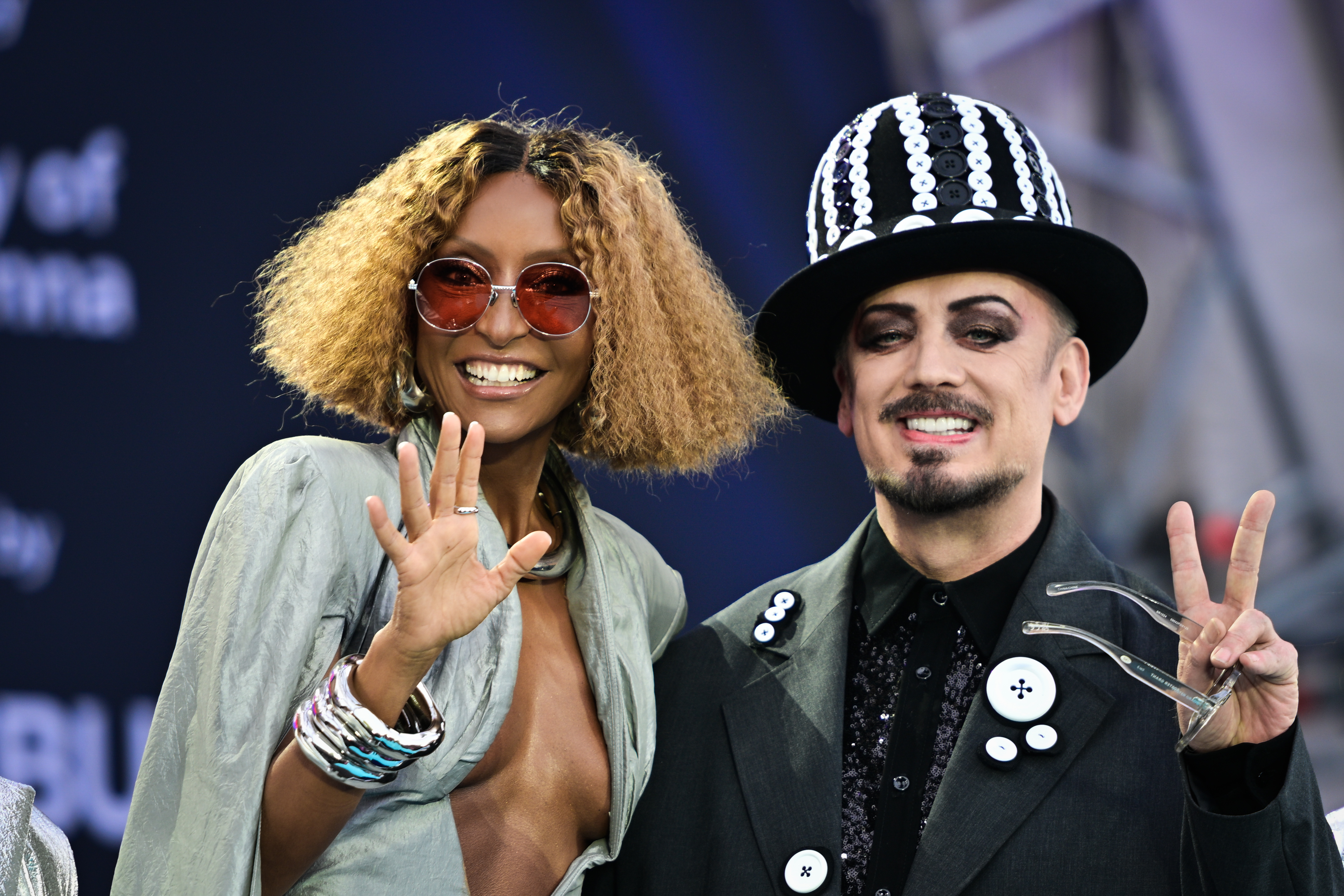
Senhit and Boy George won San Marino Song Contest 2026 with the song "Superstar" and proceeded to represent San Marino at the Eurovision Song Contest.

The final took place on 6 March 2026 at the Teatro Nuovo in Dogana and was hosted by Simona Ventura. All twenty-one finalists were announced by SMRTV on 26 February 2026, prior to the broadcast of the semi-finals. Of the participants, ten were pre-qualified "Big Artist" entries who were invited to partake and ten were entries that qualified from the semi-finals; an additional finalist, Marco Cervellini, was selected through a wildcard reserved for singers holding Sammarinese citizenship. Guest performances by non-participants included Cristiano Malgioglio, – who received a Lifetime Achievement Award from San Marino Secretary of State Federico Pedini Amati – Elettra Lamborghini and former Eurovision entrants Al Bano (Italy 1976 and 1985 along with Romina Power) and Tommy Cash (Estonia 2025).

The winner of the final was "Superstar", written by Anderz Wrethov, George Alan O'Dowd, Julie Aagaard, John-Emil Johansson, Thomas Stengaard and Senhit Zadik Zadik, and performed by the latter with uncredited vocals from O'Dowd under his stage name Boy George. It was selected by a jury consisting of Federica Gentile (television and radio host), Massimo Zanotti (conductor and arranger), Beppe D'Onghia (pianist, composer and conductor), Mario Andrea Ettorre (marketing manager at the Italian Society of Authors and Editors) and Roberto Sergio (SMRTV director).

The final also saw several acts receive special awards from the jury for their participation. These included SMRTV's Ludovido Di Meo Award to Pellegrina Pibigas with "Il giorno che", – awarded by a press jury composed by Renato Tortarolo, Federico Vacalebre, Laura Rio, Loredana Errico, and Francesca Pierleoni – the Critics Award to Dolcenera with "My Love", – awarded by a selection panel composed by Morgan, Red Ronnie and former Eurovision entrant Iva Zanicchi (Italy 1969) – the Dreaming San Marino Award for the Best Emerging artist to Maya Azucena with "My Sin", the Titano Style Award for the Best Look to Rosa Chemical, and, finally, the SIAE Award to Dolcenera.

Final – 6 March 2026
R/O	Artist	Country	Song	Place
1	Pellegrina Pibigas	Italy	"Il giorno che"	–
2	Magdalena Tul	Poland	"I'll Be Around"	–
3	Klem	Italy	"Ok respira"	–
4	Molella feat. Maxè	Italy	"Fever"	–
5	Iuna	Italy	"Freedom Calling"	–
6	Paolo Belli	Italy	"Bellissima"	3
7	Orphy	Czechia	"Rise Again"	–
8	Andreas Habibi feat. Aura	United Arab Emirates	"All We Need Is Love"	–
9	Dolcenera	Italy	"My Love"	–
10	Myky	Italy	"Outta Tune"	–
11	Kelly Joyce	France	"Oh là là"	2
12	Luka Basi	Slovenia	"Chicolo"	–
13	Anna Smith	Switzerland	"Bruised"	–
14	Matias Ferreira	Spain	"Paura"	–
15	Rosa Chemical	Italy	"Mammamì"	–
16	Orchestraccia	Italy	"Cara madre mia"	–
17	Senhit (Note: Features uncredited vocals by Boy George)	Italy	"Superstar"	1
18	Inis Neziri	Albania	"In My Head"	4
19	Edward Maya feat. William Imola	Romania; Italy	"Balla"	–
20	Maya Azucena	United States	"My Sin"	4
21	Marco	San Marino	"Shine"	–

=== Promotion ===
Following the song's selection, Senhit and Boy George met in-person in Las Vegas in late March 2026 for the first time to begin coordination and planning for their Eurovision performance. To promote the entry, Senhit toured several countries in late March and early April, including Greece, Norway, Albania, Georgia, and Azerbaijan, meeting with fans, performing "Superstar", and taking interviews with the various broadcasters. The tour included a repeat visit to Greece on 6 April, where she appeared on network ANT1's The 2Night Show, and met with Cyprus's 2026 entrant Antigoni. Senhit also attended Eurovision pre-parties, including the Nordic Eurovision Party in Oslo on 21 March,, the Eurovision in Concert series on 11 April at the AFAS Live Arena in Amsterdam where she was one of 26 entrants for 2026 who took part, and the London Eurovision Party on 19 April at HERE at Outernet, which included her first time singing the song alongside Boy George.

A series hosted by Senhit titled Pop Road to Eurovision was aired in advance of the contest between 28 April and 1 May and 5 and 8 May, where she visited eight countries across Europe and met with Eurovision fans and prior artists to discuss performances and stories. Filming for the episodes that incliuded prior Sammarinese entrants Megara (2024) and Piqued Jacks (2023) took place in December 2025.

== At Eurovision ==
The Eurovision Song Contest 2026 took place at the Wiener Stadthalle in Vienna, Austria, and consisted of two semi-finals held on the respective dates of 12 and 14 May and the final on 16 May 2026. All nations with the exceptions of the host country and the "Big Four" (France, Germany, Italy and the United Kingdom) were required to qualify from one of two semi-finals in order to compete for the final; the top ten countries from each semi-final progressed to the final. On 12 January 2026, an allocation draw was held to determine which of the two semi-finals, as well as which half of the show, each country performed in; the European Broadcasting Union (EBU) split up the competing countries into different pots based on voting patterns from previous contests, with countries with favourable voting histories put into the same pot. San Marino was allocated for the first semi final, and later, was announced to perform in position thirteen during the show.

In San Marino, all the shows of the contest were broadcast on San Marino RTV, with commentary by Anna Gaspari and Gigi Restivo. Restivo had served as commentator since the nation's contest debut in 2008, while 2026 marked Gaspari's second year as co-commentator.

=== Semi final ===
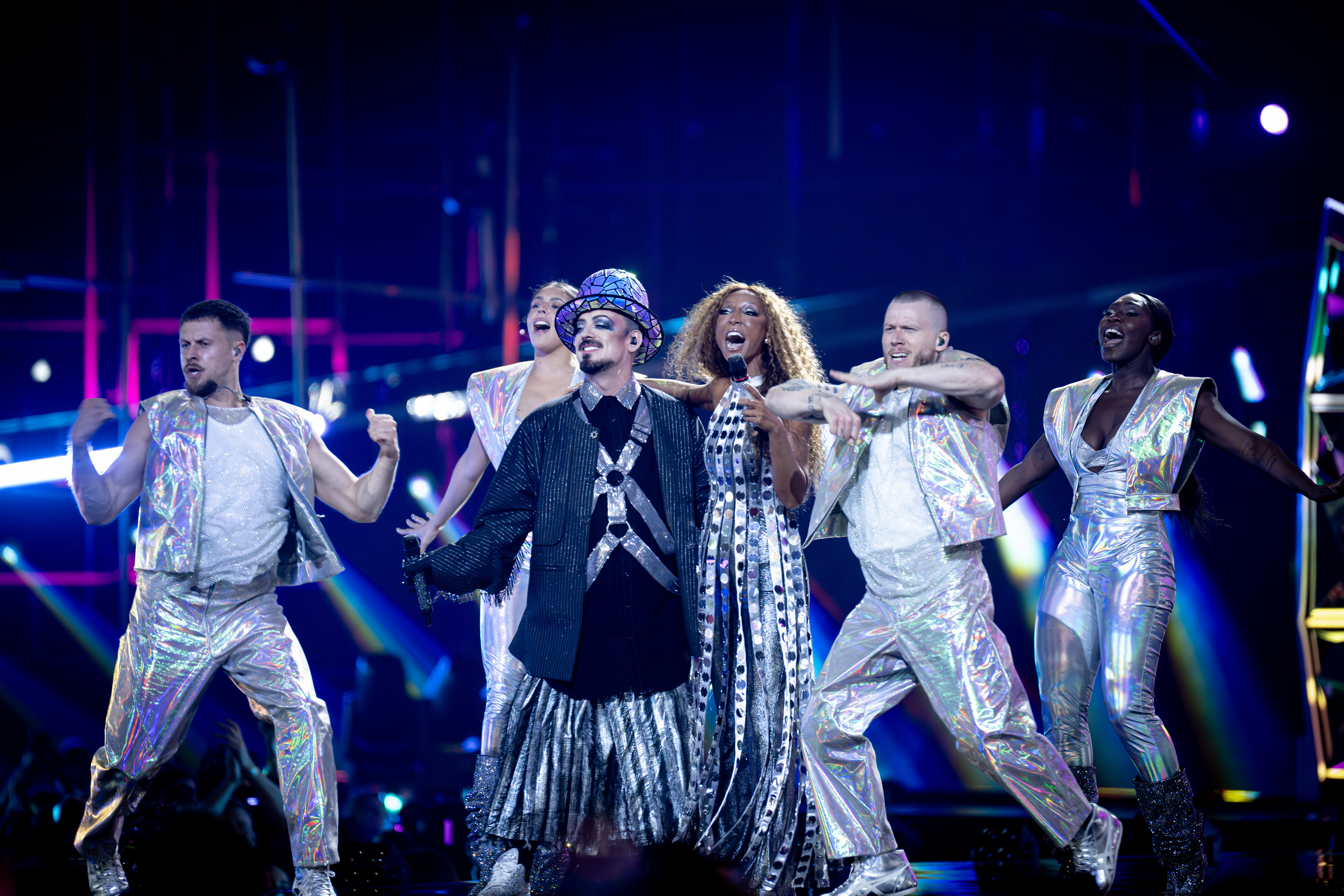
"Superstar" being performed in the first semi-final of the Eurovision Song Contest 2026

Senhit and Boy George took part in technical rehearsals on 4 May, followed by dress rehearsals on 11 and 12 May. The performance of "Superstar" was staged by Black Skull Creative and included four dancers in addition to Senhit and George. The dancers were Anders Nielsen, James Mulford, Kate Ivory Jordan and Marion Fagbemi. Senhit performed in a "sparkling silver" dress, while The Independent's Roisin O'Connor wrote that Boy George donned a "version of his signature high-crowned bowler hats with a mirror mosaic design, matched with glittering blue eyeshadow." The stage-surround consisted of mirrors, glass, and crystals.

San Marino's "Superstar" was performed in the first semi-final in position 13, following the entry from Lithuania and preceding the entry from Poland. Shortly after conclusion of the semi-final, the qualification–announcement segment took place, during which San Marino was not announced as one of the ten qualifiers, therefore, the nation did not move on to the final. When the full results were released, it was revealed that the entry had placed 14th with 41 points.

=== Voting ===
Voting during the three shows involved each country awarding sets of points from 1–8, 10 and 12: one from their professional jury and the other from televoting. As San Marino shares its telephone system with Italy, an aggregate televote created using the televotes of neighbouring countries was used. The Sammarinese jury consisted of Alberto Carlo Braschi, Elia Rinaldi, Fabrizio Raggi, Martin Minotti, Amalia Gozi, Sara Raschi, and Sofia Checcetti. These members were music industry professionals who are Sammarinese citizens, and this year at least two members had to be between the ages of 18 and 25. Jury members awarded points based on "composition and originality of the song, quality of the performance on stage, vocal capacity of the performer(s) and overall impression of the act".

In the first semi-final, San Marino placed 14th of the 15 participants. It received 41 points in total, with the highest point awards being eight from both Israel and Italy. Over the course of the contest, the nation awarded its top 12 points to Greece (jury) and Israel (aggregate televote) in the first semi-final and to Malta (jury) and Greece (aggregate televote) in the final. French singer Kelly Joyce served as the Sammarinese spokesperson, announcing the votes awarded by the Sammarinese jury during the final.

==== Points awarded to San Marino ====
Points awarded to San Marino (Semi-final 1)
Score	Televote	Jury
12 points		
10 points		
8 points	Israel; Italy	
7 points	Greece	
6 points		Montenegro
5 points		
4 points		Georgia; Italy
3 points		
2 points		Israel
1 point		Estonia; Sweden

==== Points awarded by San Marino ====
Points awarded by San Marino (Semi-final 1)
Score	Televote	Jury
12 points	Israel	Greece
10 points	Moldova	Israel
8 points	Finland	Finland
7 points	Serbia	Montenegro
6 points	Poland	Croatia
5 points	Portugal	Moldova
4 points	Estonia	Sweden
3 points	Croatia	Serbia
2 points	Lithuania	Georgia
1 point	Greece	Poland

Points awarded by San Marino (Final)
Score	Televote	Jury
12 points	Greece	Malta
10 points	Bulgaria	Italy
8 points	Italy	Bulgaria
7 points	Cyprus	Romania
6 points	Romania	Greece
5 points	Australia	Albania
4 points	Finland	Israel
3 points	Israel	Cyprus
2 points	Moldova	Finland
1 point	Albania	Denmark

==== Detailed voting results ====
The following members comprised the Sammarinese jury:

- Alberto Carlo Braschi
- Elia Rinaldi
- Fabrizio Raggi
- Martin Minotti
- Amalia Gozi
- Sara Raschi
- Sofia Checcetti

Detailed voting results from San Marino (Semi-final 1)
R/O	Country	Jury									Televote	
R/O	Country	Juror A	Juror B	Juror C	Juror D	Juror E	Juror F	Juror G	Rank	Points	Rank	Points
01	Moldova	9	11	6	3	1	9	4	6	5	2	10
02	Sweden	3	6	5	9	6	12	5	7	4	12	
03	Croatia	4	3	8	1	8	6	8	5	6	8	3
04	Greece	1	1	1	8	2	2	1	1	12	10	1
05	Portugal	12	12	13	10	9	5	13	11		6	5
06	Georgia	7	8	14	5	10	14	7	9	2	14	
07	Finland	6	2	11	2	4	4	3	3	8	3	8
08	Montenegro	2	7	4	6	3	3	6	4	7	11	
09	Estonia	14	13	7	11	13	11	11	13		7	4
10	Israel	5	5	2	4	5	1	2	2	10	1	12
11	Belgium	8	14	12	12	11	7	9	12		13	
12	Lithuania	10	9	9	13	14	13	14	14		9	2
13	San Marino											
14	Poland	11	4	10	14	12	10	12	10	1	5	6
15	Serbia	13	10	3	7	7	8	10	8	3	4	7

Detailed voting results from San Marino (Final)
R/O	Country	Jury									Televote	
R/O	Country	Juror A	Juror B	Juror C	Juror D	Juror E	Juror F	Juror G	Rank	Points	Rank	Points
01	Denmark	12	3	13	11	14	13	21	10	1	12	
02	Germany	15	13	24	13	18	19	14	18		24	
03	Israel	9	16	1	5	9	8	10	7	4	8	3
04	Belgium	16	25	14	17	23	24	22	22		23	
05	Albania	3	4	12	10	10	6	7	6	5	10	1
06	Greece	6	8	4	6	3	4	15	5	6	1	12
07	Ukraine	22	20	18	19	24	23	18	23		11	
08	Australia	10	6	8	16	21	10	12	12		6	5
09	Serbia	23	22	15	21	20	12	13	19		15	
10	Malta	1	2	2	2	4	1	3	1	12	18	
11	Czechia	25	21	11	15	5	14	6	13		21	
12	Bulgaria	4	9	6	1	1	9	4	3	8	2	10
13	Croatia	24	5	16	20	11	16	5	11		19	
14	United Kingdom	13	24	19	18	13	25	20	20		22	
15	France	11	7	20	14	19	22	17	16		13	
16	Moldova	17	23	17	9	6	11	8	14		9	2
17	Finland	14	14	10	4	8	20	9	9	2	7	4
18	Poland	19	12	21	23	17	18	25	21		16	
19	Lithuania	20	18	25	25	25	15	24	24		14	
20	Sweden	7	15	23	12	15	7	16	15		20	
21	Cyprus	8	10	9	8	12	5	11	8	3	4	7
22	Italy	2	1	3	7	2	3	1	2	10	3	8
23	Norway	18	17	22	24	22	21	23	25		17	
24	Romania	5	11	7	3	7	2	2	4	7	5	6
25	Austria	21	19	5	22	16	17	19	17		25	
