= Superstar (Senhit song) =

2026 song by Senhit

Single by Senhit
- Released: 6 March 2026
- Genre: Dance-pop
- Length: 3:09 (Original version); 2:54 (Eurovision version)

Eurovision Song Contest 2026 entry
- Country: San Marino
- Artist: Senhit (Note: Features uncredited vocals by Boy George)
- Language: English
- Composers: Anderz Wrethov; Boy George; John Emil Johansson; Julie Aagaard; Senhit; Thomas Stengaard
- Lyricists: Anderz Wrethov; Boy George; John Emil Johansson; Julie Aagaard; Senhit; Thomas Stengaard

Finals performance
- Semi-final result: 14th
- Semi-final points: 41

Entry chronology
- ◄ "Tutta l'Italia" (2025)

"Superstar" is a song by Italian singer Senhit. The song represented San Marino in the Eurovision Song Contest 2026.

== Background ==
Following her previous international performances and Eurovision-related popularity, Senhit released "Superstar" as a celebration of individuality, self-confidence, and artistic freedom. The singer described the song as an "anthem about embracing one's identity and pursuing ambitions without fear".

== Composition ==
Musically, "Superstar" is an upbeat dance-pop track characterized by electronic beats, synth-driven production, and dramatic vocal delivery. The lyrics revolve around themes of empowerment, fame, and self-expression. Released in 2026, the song features elements of dance-pop and electronic music, continuing Senhit's theatrical and energetic musical style. The song incorporates disco-inspired influences alongside contemporary pop production techniques.

== Release and promotion ==
"Superstar" was released on digital streaming platforms in 2026. Senhit promoted the single through live performances, interviews, and social media campaigns. An accompanying music video premiered shortly after the song's release. The video features glamorous costumes, neon visuals, choreographed dance sequences, and theatrical staging associated with Senhit's performance style.

== Reception ==
The song received positive reactions from fans and music critics, who praised its energetic production and Senhit's charismatic performance. Some reviewers compared the song's style to contemporary Eurovision-inspired pop music.
