= Michael Ostrowski =

Austrian actor (born 1973)

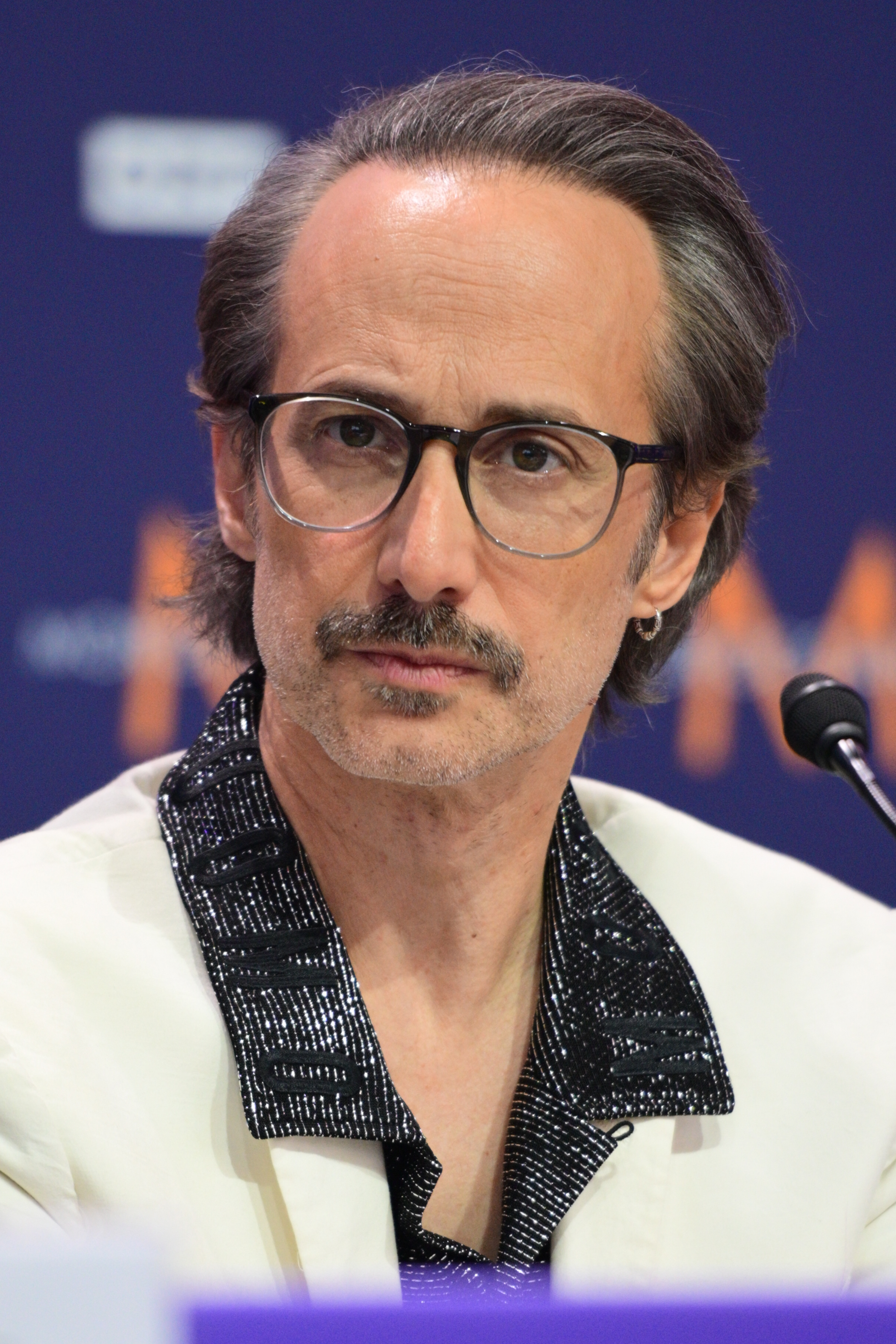
- Ostrowski in 2026
- Born: Michael Stockinger; 3 January 1973 (age 53); Leoben, Austria
- Occupations: Actor, screenwriter
- Years active: 2002–present

Michael Stockinger (born 3 January 1973), known professionally as Michael Ostrowski, is an Austrian actor and screenwriter.

== Biography ==
Stockinger grew up in Rottenmann. From 1991 on he studied English and French at Graz, Oxford and New York. Between April and December 2000, he worked as a research fellow at the Institute for Advanced Studies on Science, Technology and Society in Graz.

Stockinger started his acting career at a small theater in Graz in the late 1990s. In 2001, he landed his first role in a short film by Barbara Albert. He went on to adopt the stage name Michael Ostrowski, as there was already a cabaret performer with his legal surname.

He had his breakthrough as an actor and screenwriter in the 2004 movie Slugs. In 2011, he won the Austrian Film Award for Best Screenplay (for The Unintentional Kidnapping of Mrs. Elfriede Ott).

On 29 January 2026, the Austrian national broadcaster ORF announced that Ostrowski would host the Eurovision Song Contest 2026 in Vienna, alongside Victoria Swarovski.

== Selected filmography ==
- Help, I Shrunk My Teacher (2015)
- Cold Feet (2018)

Preceded by (Switzerland) Hazel Brugger, Sandra Studer and Michelle Hunziker (final)	Eurovision Song Contest presenter 2026; With: (Austria) Victoria Swarovski	Succeeded by Incumbent
