= Victoria Swarovski =

Austrian pop singer and model (born 1993)

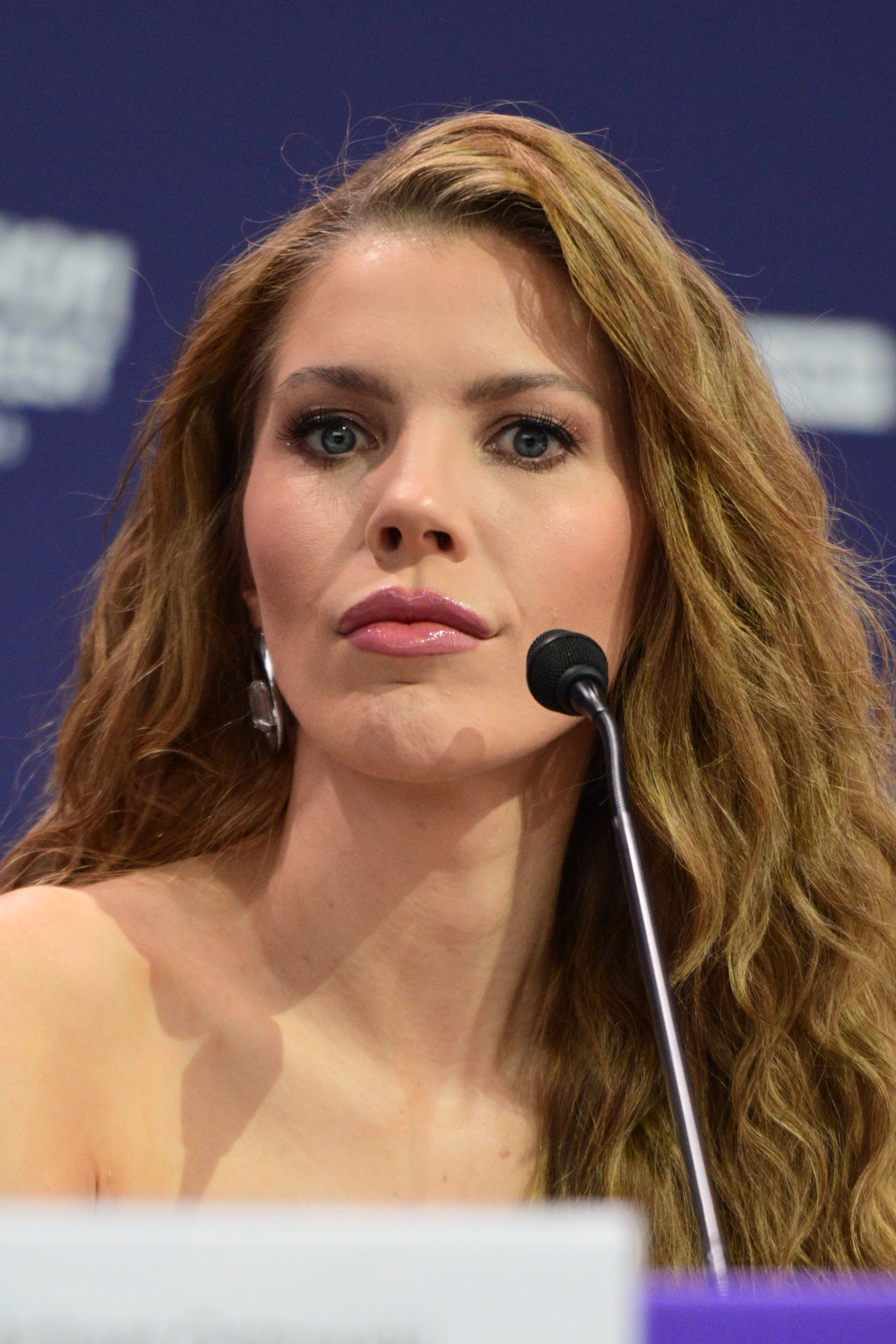
- Swarovski in 2026
- Born: 16 August 1993 (age 32); Innsbruck, Austria
- Other name: Victoria S.
- Occupations: Singer; model; presenter
- Height: 172 cm (5 ft 8 in)
- Spouse: Werner Mürz (m. 2017; div. 2022)
- Parents: Paul Swarovski (father); Alexandra Swarovski (mother)
- Musical career
- Also known as: Victoria S.
- Genres: Pop
- Years active: 2010–present

Victoria Swarovski (born 16 August 1993) is an Austrian pop singer, model, television presenter, and businesswoman. She is an heiress to the multi-billion dollar Austrian private company Swarovski, active in the fashion, crystal, and jewellery industries. She co-hosted the Eurovision Song Contest 2026 in Vienna.

== Biography ==
Swarovski is the daughter of Alexandra and Paul Swarovski. Her mother worked as a journalist, and her father is president in the family-owned company Swarovski.

Since her childhood, she sang in several choirs. In 2009, she appeared with the song "Get gone" in a TV-show of Mario Barth. At 17, she signed a record-deal with Sony Music. In November 2010, she released her debut single "One in a Million" via Sony Music. She sang an officially authorized international version of the original song by Carrie Underwood "There's a Place for us" - the theme song in the film The Chronicles of Narnia: The Voyage of the Dawn Treader. It was released as part of the soundtrack promotion for German-speaking countries.

While Swarovski appeared under the name Victoria S. in the early years of her career, she now uses her real name. In 2014, she released the song "Beautiful" together with rapper Prince Kay One. In 2016, she won the ninth season of the RTL dance show Let's dance; her dance-partner was Erich Klann. In September 2016, she sat next to Dieter Bohlen and Bruce Darnell in the jury of the RTL casting-show Das Supertalent.

Since 2010, Swarovski was in a relationship with real-estate-investor Werner Mürz. The couple married on 20 May 2017; they later divorced in 2022. She is now in a relationship with Mark Mateschitz of Red Bull.

In 2018, Swarovski replaced Sylvie Meis as the co-host in the eleventh season of Let's dance.

In 2021, Swarovski founded the beauty-brand Orimei Beauty.

Swarovski hosted the Eurovision Song Contest 2026 in Vienna alongside Michael Ostrowski.

=== Let's Dance performances ===
Week #	Dance / Song	Judges' scores					Result
Week #	Dance / Song	González	Mabuse	Thomalla	Llambi	Total	Result
1	Cha-cha-cha / I Don't Like It, I Love It	8	8	8	7	31	Safe
2	Foxtrot / Supergirl	9	9	8	7	33	Safe
3	Jive / Wake Me Up Before You Go-Go	9	9	8	8	34	Safe
4	Rumba / Unbreak My Heart	8	8	8	7	31	Safe
5	Samba / Lean On	9	8	8	8	33	Safe
6	Tango / El Antifaz; Team Freestyle / Sail	10; 7	10; 7	10; 7	10; 7	40; 28	Safe
7	Charleston / Happy	9	10	10	9	38	Safe
8	Contemporary / Show Me Heaven; Jive / The Boy Does Nothing	9; 8	9; 8	8; 8	8; 7	34; 31	Safe
9	Quickstep / Walk Like an Egyptian; Cha-cha-cha + Rumba / On the Radio	10; 10	10; 10	10; 10	10; 10	40; 40	Safe
10	Salsa / La Bomba; Paso doble / El sombrero blanco Instant Foxtrot / Don't Worry, Be Happy	10; 10; 10	10; 10; 10	10; 10; 10	9; 10; 10	39; 40; 40	Safe
11	Waltz / Wie Schön du bist Samba / Lean On; Freestyle / The Mask Medley	10; 10; 9	10; 10; 9	10; 10; 9	10; 9; 10	40; 39; 37	Winner

Preceded by (Switzerland) Hazel Brugger, Sandra Studer and Michelle Hunziker (final)	Eurovision Song Contest presenter 2026; With: (Austria) Michael Ostrowski	Succeeded by Incumbent
