= Henry Schut =

Dutch sports journalist

Henry Schut (born 1976) is a Dutch sports journalist.

== Biography ==
Schut was born in Scherpenzeel, Gelderland. He aspired to be a radio discjockey from an early age. However, due to limited opportunities in that field, his school counselor advised him to attended the School voor Journalistiek, which Schut did from 1995 onwards. In 2005, Schut made his debut as radio and television presenter. He has worked for NOS Studio Sport ever since.

In 2013, he started as host of the sunday radio show of NOS Langs de Lijn. Schut covered the 2012 Summer Olympics and 2014 Winter Olympics. As of 2025, he regularly appears as a diskjockey on NPO Radio 5.

Schut has three children.
