= Fiorenza Calogero =

Italian singer and actress (born 1978)

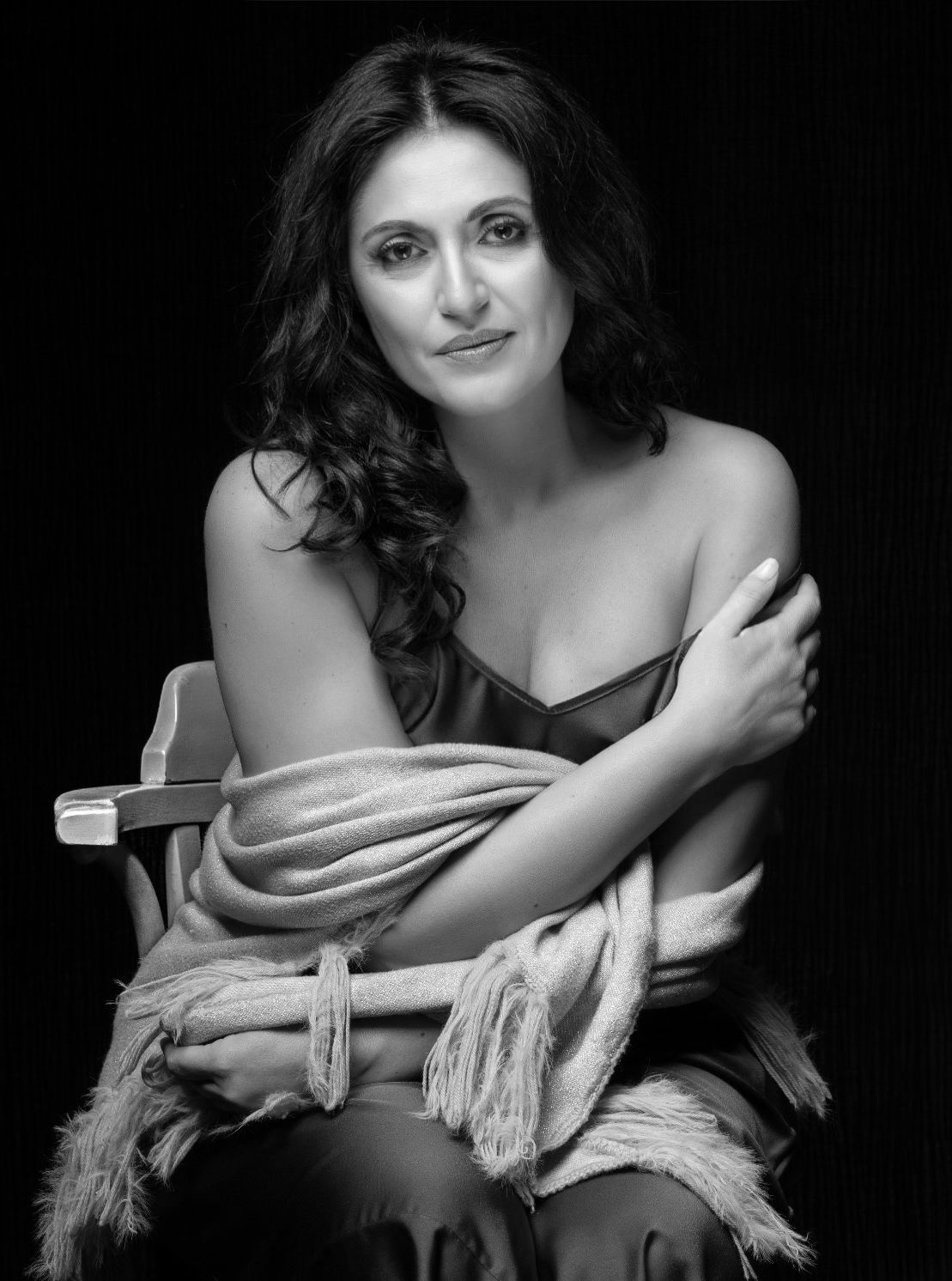
- Calogero in 2024

Background information
- Born: Fiorenza Calogero; 7 July 1978 (age 47); Castellammare di Stabia, Naples, Italy
- Genres: World music; Canzone napoletana
- Occupations: Singer, actress
- Years active: 1998–present
- Labels: Black Tarantella, Migrazioni Sonore
- Website: fiorenzacalogero.it

Fiorenza Calogero (born 7 July 1978) is an Italian world music singer and actress.

== Biography ==
Fiorenza Calogero was born on 7 July, 1978, in Castellammare di Stabia.

She worked with Roberto De Simone, who engaged her in significant roles in such performances as La Gatta Cenerentola, staged in the gardens of the Palais Royal, Paris; at Sadler's Wells Theatre, London; Festival Grec, Barcelona (1999/2000); and the major Italian theaters (Teatro La Pergola, Florence; Teatro Bonci, Cesena; Piccolo Teatro, Milan; Arena del Sole, Bologna, Teatro Valli, Reggio Emilia), Lo Vommaro a duello (2008), a production of the Teatro di San Carlo for the "Napoli Teatro Festival" Italia. The concert performance of Li Turchi Viaggiano by De Simone, toured Argentina in 2001 (Teatro Coliseo, Buenos Aires, Gran Teatro de Cordoba, El Circulo Theater, Rosario; Teatro Apolo, Mar del Plata, Teatro Municipal, Bahia Blanca; Teatro del Bicentenario, San Juan) as well as Uruguay (Theatre Star of Italy, Montevideo). Fiorenza's vocal repertoire includes neapolitan songs, various jazz forms, and many Mediterranean influences.

In 2001 she won the Prix Saint Vincent with the classic song Indifferentemente. In 2007, she presented her Neapolitan songbook at "Columbus Day". In 2008, the journalist-musicologist Pietro Gargano devoted to her two pages in his Encyclopedia of classic Neapolitan song (Edizioni Magmata). Her interpretations of the neapolitan classics are preserved in the sound archives of the Rai radio-station and in 2009 she received the "Naples in the World Award" in Ravello (Italy).

In 2007 Fiorenza made the first album Fioreincanto, a collection of classic songs in the Neapolitan language on the IMAIE label. Her second album, Fiorenza, was released in 2009 by the Dutch CNR Music label. This disc presents, in alternation, classic and unpublished traditional melodies with incursions into pop-opera, in duo with the tenor Vittorio Grigolo.

Subsequently, she toured with Alessandro Safina the main Dutch theaters (Vedrenburg Tivoli, Utrecht; Theater aan de Parade, Den Bosch; Muziekgebouw, Eindowen; Luxor Theater, Rotterdam). She performed in "Winter Classics" at the Heineken Music Hall in Amsterdam (2009), "The Night of the Voice" at the Theater Schouwburg Almere (2010), "Beautiful Italy" at Chasse Theater Breda (2010) in collaboration with the Dutch baritone Ernst Daniël Smid.

Concurrently she collaborated with l'Accademia Mandolinistica Napoletana, with which she gave concerts in Rome, Warsaw, Crakow, Paris, London, Berlin and Luxembourg; as well as with the Lost Sound Orchestra, which widened her knowledge of early instruments (House of Music, Parma 2009; Palazzo European Union, Madrid 2010); she performed with Bruno Garofalo at the Teatro Poliorama Barcelona in the Napoli nella tempesta concert, featuring Eduardo De Filippo's adaptation of the sonnets by William Shakespeare (2008).

Several other significant points in her career should be mentioned as well: Sentieri Mediterranei, the festival of classical and world music in Summonte (Avellino) from 2003 to 2015; Premio Carosone, Teatro Politeama – Napoli (2008); Rassegna OrtoVolante (2012 and 2013), Real Orto Botanico – Napoli; Intricanti Festival (Sant’Agata sui due golfi 2013); Festival Anime Verso (Morigerati 2013); Adriatico Mediterraneo Festival (Ancona 2014); Ventotene Classic Festival (Ventotene 2014); Musica Antica in Valcomino (San Donato in Val Comino 2014).

In 2009, she contributed with her performance of the Canto delle lavandaie del Vomero (one of the oldest of Neapolitan songs, dating from the thirteenth century) to the film Passione directed by John Turturro, presented out of competition at the Venice Film Festival.

In 2011, the label Edel published the third album Sotto il Vestito... Napoli, accompanied by jazz pianist Lorenzo Hengeller.

Among her most important stage collaborations that should be mentioned here are those with Cristina Branco, Amal Murkus, Urna, and Pino De Vittorio. She participated, with the singer-songwriter/multi-instrumentalist/composer Enzo Avitabile, in the biopic Enzo Avitabile Music Life (2011), directed by the Oscar winner Jonathan Demme, in the scene Anola Tranola with the Malian musician Toumani Diabaté. The film was presented out of competition at the Venice Film Festival in 2013.

She was the soloist at the concert for the "La Repubblica delle idee" initiative in Naples in 2014.

Enzo Avitabile is also the author of the songs from her newest album, entitled Nun tardare sole (2015). The song "Tre Fronne e tre ciure", one of the most intense of the disc, was presented at Epiphany Concert at the Teatro Mediterraneo in Naples in January 2015, and broadcast on RAI 1.

In October 2016, she participates at Heinrich Schütz Musikfest in Dresden (Germany) with the Ensemble L'Arpeggiata directed by Christina Pluhar.

Artistic director and creator of important music festivals, to remember some: Migrazioni Sonore, Festival of musical Cultures of the World (Montefalcione 2007/2008/2009); Napoli Dea Madre – di voce in Donna, a women's Festival made for the Forum of Cultures of Naples in 2014 with the singers Cristina Branco and Amal Murkus; Irpinia Terra di Mezzo (Villamaina, RoccaSanFelice, Sant'Angelo dei Lombardi, Chiusano San Domenico, Caliteri, Torella dei Lombardi January 2017/RoccaSanFelice and Guardia Lombardi December 2017).

In 2017, he was guest of the broadcast in worldwide on Rai Italia "Community – l'altra Italia" presented by Benedetta Rinaldi where Fiorenza told about his career and given musical moments accompanied by the inseparable "chitarra battente" of Marcello Vitale.

== Family ==
Her husband is Marcello Vitale, a noted chitarra battente virtuoso.

== Artistic collaborations ==
Calogero has collaborated with Ernst Daniël Smid, Vittorio Grigolo, Alessandro Safina, Antonio Sinagra, Rino Zurzolo, Roberto Pregadio, Bruno Biriaco, Adriano Pennino, Peppe Vessicchio, Enzo Gragnianiello, Eugenio Bennato, Lino Cannavacciuolo, Enzo Avitabile, Cristina Branco, Toumani Diabaté, Amal Murkus, Urna, Pino De Vittorio, Elena Ledda, Mbarka Ben Taleb, Rosalia De Souza, Elisabetta Serio, Jaques Morelembaum, Maria Mazzotta, Ebbanesis, Elisabetta Serio, Carlo Faiello, Antonio Amato, Mario Incudine, Biagio De Prisco, Lino Vairetti, L'Arpeggiata, Christina Pluhar, Patrizia Spinosi, Luca Aquino, Ferruccio Spinetti, Pericle Odierna, Roberto Schiano, Erasmo Petringa, Nello Daniele, Gennaro Desiderio, Antonio Fresa, Fratelli Minale, Marcello Vitale, Salvio Vassallo, Mario Maglione.

== Discography ==
=== As soloist ===
- 2007 – Fioreincanto (IMAIE)
- 2009 – Fiorenza (CNR Music)
- 2011 – Sotto il Vestito... Napoli (Edel), featuring pianist Lorenzo Hengeller
- 2012 - Ristampa di Fioreincanto (Edizioni Graf)
- 2016 – Nun Tardare Sole (Black Tarantella/iCompany s.r.l.), featuring Enzo Avitabile, Marcello Vitale, Carlos Pinana, Pino De Vittorio, Cristina Branco, Urna
- 2017 - Live in Napoli (Migrazioni Sonore - Italy Sound Lab)
- 2020 - DonnaMadonna Canto Mediterraneo (Migrazioni Sonore - Italy Sound Lab)
- 2024 - Vico Viviani (Migrazioni Sonore, distribuzione SoundFly) featuring Jaques Morelenbaum, Elisabetta Serio, Maria Mazzotta, Elena Ledda, Rosalia De Souza, Mbarka Ben Taleb, Eugenio Bennato, Le Ebbanesis, Patrizia Spinosi, Luca Aquino, Maurizio Capone, Erasmo Petringa, Ferruccio Spinetti, Francesca del Duca, Ezio Lambiase, Pericle Odierna, Roberto Schiano. Rielaborazioni musicali e arrangiamenti di Marcello Vitale.

=== Guest appearances ===
- 2005 – Le terre del fuoco by Vito Mercurio (Note Di Merito)
- 2007/2008/2009 – Rosa Napoletano (vol. I, II, III) by Renato Salvetti (Rogiosi)
- 2010 – Passione: Un Avventura Musicale (Original Motion Picture Soundtrack)
- 2011 – Onde di terra by Peppe Sannino (Obliqua)

== Theatrical performances ==
- 1999/2000 – "La Gatta Cenerentola", directed by Roberto De Simone
- 2000 – "L´Opera buffa del Giovedì santo", directed by Roberto De Simone
- 2000 – "Li Turchi viaggiano" (2000), directed by Roberto De Simone
- 2001 – "Dedicato a Giulia De Caro", directed by Roberto De Simone
- 2002 – "Omaggio a Giordano Bruno", directed by Roberto De Simone
- 2003 – "Sacro e pagano", directed by Pasquale dello Monaco
- 2004 – "´Na sceneggiata", directed by Antonio Calenda
- 2005 – "Napoli nella tempesta", directed by Bruno Garofalo
- 2005 – "Voci di terre lontane", directed by Karima Angiolina Campanelli
- 2006 – "Mettetevi comodi", directed by Gino Rivieccio
- 2006 – "Era la festa di San Gennaro", directed by Giacomo Rizzo
- 2006 – "Mal'aria", directed by Bruno Garofalo, choreography by Franco Miseria
- 2007 – "Signori si nasce", directed by Gaetano Liguori, with Rino Marcelli
- 2007 – "Io speriamo che me la cavo", with Maurizio Casagrande
- 2007 – "Balli di Sfessania", directed by Bruno Garofalo, with Mariano Rigillo
- 2008 – "Lo Vommero a duello", directed by Roberto De Simone
- 2009 – "Quanno ce vo´ ce vo´", directed by Gino Rivieccio
- 2009 – "Padroni di barche" by Raffaele Viviani, directed by Armando Pugliese
- 2009 – "Senza impegno", directed by Maurizo Casagrande
- 2010 – "Uomo e galantuomo" by Eduardo De Filippo, with Francesco Paolantoni, directed by Armando Pugliese
- 2011 – "La pazienza differenziata", directed by Gino Rivieccio
- 2011 – "Napoli chi resta e chi parte", directed by Armando Pugliese
- 2012/2013/2014 – "Baccalà" by Eduardo De Filippo, directed by Enzo Attanasio
- 2015 – "Io e Napoli", directed by Gino Rivieccio
- 2017 – "Novecento napoletano", directed by Bruno Garofalo

== Cinema ==
- 2010 – Passione, directed by John Turturro
- 2013 – Enzo Avitabile Music Life, directed by Jonathan Demme

== Television ==
- 2015 – Concerto per l'Epifania, Rai Uno

== Artistic direction ==
- 2007/2008/2009 – Festival Migrazioni Sonore – Montefalcione (Avellino, Italy)
- 2014 – Napoli Dea Madre, Forum Universale delle Culture – Napoli

== Awards and honours ==
- 2001 - Premio Saint Vincent, prima classificata miglior interprete, Teatro Giacosa, Ivrea
- 2008 - Premio Orgoglio Stabiese, Nuove Terme Castellammare di Stabia
- 2009 – Naples in the World Award – Ravello (Italy)
- 2013 - Premio I Cantori di Arianna, Teatro Supercinema, Castellammare di Stabia
- 2021 - Premio Rosso di Stabia, Giardini di Arianna, Castellammare di Stabia
- 2018 - Premio Masaniello, Villa Floridiana, Napoli
- 2019 - Premio Miradois, Terrazza Miradois Napoli
- 2020 - Premio della Legalità Annalisa Durante, Teatro Trianon, Napoli
- 2022 - Premio Franco Corbisiero, Palazzo Vanvitelliano Mercato San Severino
- 2023 - Premio Naples in the World, Galleria Maiorino Nocera
