= Marcello Vitale =

Italian guitarist (born 1969)

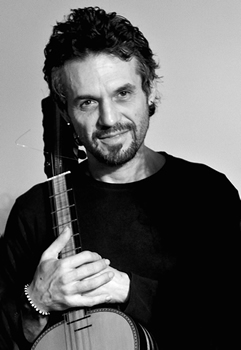

Background information
- Birth name: Marcello Vitale
- Born: October 11, 1969 (age 55); Benevento
- Origin: Italy
- Genres: World Music; Early Music
- Occupation(s): guitarist, composer, arranger
- Instrument(s): chitarra battente, baroque guitar
- Years active: 1985–present
- Labels: Rai Trade

Marcello Vitale (born in 1969 in Benevento, Italy) is a performer and recording artist on the chitarra battente and baroque guitar, as well as a composer and a teacher of these instruments.

== Biography ==
In 1997 he performed as a soloist in Lezioni di tarantella, an event organised by Eugenio Bennato, held in Naples at Città della Scienza. On that occasion he joined the group Musicanova.

In 1999, together with Lilli Greco and Paolo Raffone, composes and performs the soundtrack of the film Ferdinando e Carolina by the Director Lina Wertmuller, earning the European Prize Massimo Troisi to the music. In the same year he was elected an honorary member of the Medici Academy of Florence for his works in the World Music.

In 2001, together with drummer Franco Del Prete, writes the song Pioverà, performed at the Sanremo Festival in the same year by Peppino Di Capri.

In 2005 is called by Roberto De Simone to play the chitarra battente in his work, Il Socrate immaginario by Giovanni Paisiello (Director and musical review by R. De Simone) represented in the month of September to San Carlo Theatre in Naples.

Since 2001 collaborates with the ensemble L'Arpeggiata directed by Christina Pluhar, with whom he recorded two CDs for the label Alpha, one for Naïve and three for EMI and performed in the most important concert halls around the world such as Carnegie Hall in New York City, the Walt Disney Concert Hall in Los Angeles, the Barbican Center in London, the Wigmore Hall in London, the Salle Gaveau in Paris.

== Discography ==
- 1990 – Magicorò (with Musicalia)
- 1997 – Le tarantelle del Gargano (with Pino De Vittorio)
- 1998 – Pape Kanoute (with Pape Kanoute)
- 1998 – Taranta Power (with Eugenio Bennato)
- 1998 – Lezioni di tarantella (with Eugenio Bennato)
- 2001 – Che il mediterraneo sia (with Eugenio Bennato)
- 2001 – Intrasatta (with ASSURD)
- 2002 – La tarantella (with L'Arpeggiata - Christina Pluhar)
- 2002 – Chitarra battente
- 2003 – Napoli mediterranea (with Pietra Montecorvino)
- 2004 – All'improvviso (with L'Arpeggiata - Christina Pluhar)
- 2004 – Truffe & other sturiellett' vol. 2 (with Daniele Sepe)
- 2005 – Le tarantelle del rimorso (with Pino De Vittorio)
- 2005 – AltoCalore
- 2006 – Los impossibles (with L'Arpeggiata - Christina Pluhar)
- 2009 – Teatro d'amore (with L'Arpeggiata - Christina Pluhar)
- 2010 – Via Crucis (with L'Arpeggiata - Christina Pluhar)
- 2011 – Los pajaros perdidos (con L'Arpeggiata - Christina Pluhar)
- 2012 – Mediterraneo (with L'Arpeggiata - Christina Pluhar)
- 2013 – Music for a while (with L'Arpeggiata - Christina Pluhar)
