= Passione (2010 film) =

- Film poster
- Directed by: John Turturro
- Produced by: Alessandra Acciai; Carlo Macchitella; Giorgio Magliulo; Patrizia Massa
- Starring: John Turturro; Fiorello; Massimo Ranieri; Lina Sastri; Peppe Barra; Peppe Servillo; Raiz; Loredana Simioli; M'Barka Ben Taleb; Avion Travel; Mísia; Gennaro Cosmo Parlato; Pietra Montecorvino; James Senese; Fausto Cigliano; Enzo Avitabile
- Cinematography: Marco Pontecorvo
- Release date: 4 September 2010
- Running time: 90 minutes
- Country: Italy
- Languages: English; Italian; Neapolitan

Passione is a 2010 documentary film directed by John Turturro. It was filmed on location in Naples, Italy. The film was released in the United States in June 2011.

== Plot ==
Passione chronicles the rich Neapolitan musical heritage, tracing the influences of European, African and Arabic cultures, while touching on the Canzone napoletana (Neapolitan song) tradition. The film features dozens of contemporary solo performers and ensembles who are currently established on the city's music scene, including Fiorenza Calogero, Pietra Montecorvino, James Senese, Peppe Barra, Fausto Cigliano, and Rosario Fiorello.

The film also explores the city's music history with archival footage and accounts of such historic artists as Enrico Caruso, Sergio Bruni, Massimo Ranieri, and Renato Carosone.

Passione is the fourth film directed by Turturro, who is primarily known for his film and television acting roles. In addition to co-writing the screenplay, he appears on-camera sporadically, serving as tour guide, cultural commentator, and occasional extra in music shoots. Scenes were filmed at San Domenico Maggiore's Square, at Castel dell'Ovo, at Castel Sant'Elmo and at Solfatara.

== Critical reception ==
The film received positive reviews from film critics. Review aggregator Rotten Tomatoes reports that 89% of professional critics gave the film a positive review, with a rating average of 7.2 out of 10.

== Songs and performers ==
- Carmela (Mina)
- Vesuvio (Spakka - Neapolis 55)
- Era de maggio (Avion Travel and Mísia)
- I' te vurria vasà (Valentina Ok)
- Dicitencello vuje (Riccardo Ciccarelli)
- Malafemmena (Massimo Ranieri and Lina Sastri)
- Maruzzella (Gennaro Cosmo Parlato)
- Comme facette mammeta (Pietra Montecorvino, arranged by Eugenio Bennato)
- Antica ninna nanna partenope (Don Alfonzo)
- 'O Sole mio (Sergio Bruni, Massimo Ranieri, M'Barka Ben Taleb)
- Bammenella (Angela Luce)
- Don Raffaè (Peppe Barra)
- Passione (James Senese)
- Nun te scurda' (Almamegretta with Raiz, Pietra Montecorvino, M'Barka Ben Taleb)
- Tammurriata nera (Peppe Barra, Max Casella, M'Barka Ben Taleb)
- Pistol Packing Mama (Al Dexter & His Troopers)
- Catari (Fausto Cigliano)
- Caravan petrol (Fiorello, Max Casella, John Turturro)
- 'O Sole mio (Renato Carosone, piano)
- 'A Vucchella (Enrico Caruso)
- Marechiare (Fernando De Lucia)
- Faccia Gialla (Enzo Avitabile, Bottari, Scorribanda)
- Canto delle lavandaie del Vomero (Daniela Fiorentino, Fiorenza Calogero, Lorena Tamaggio)
- Dove sta Zazà? (Pietra Montecorvino, Max Casella)
- Indifferentemente (Mísia)
- Sangh'e (James Senese)
- Napule è (Pino Daniele)
