= Sal Da Vinci =

Italian singer and actor (born 1969)

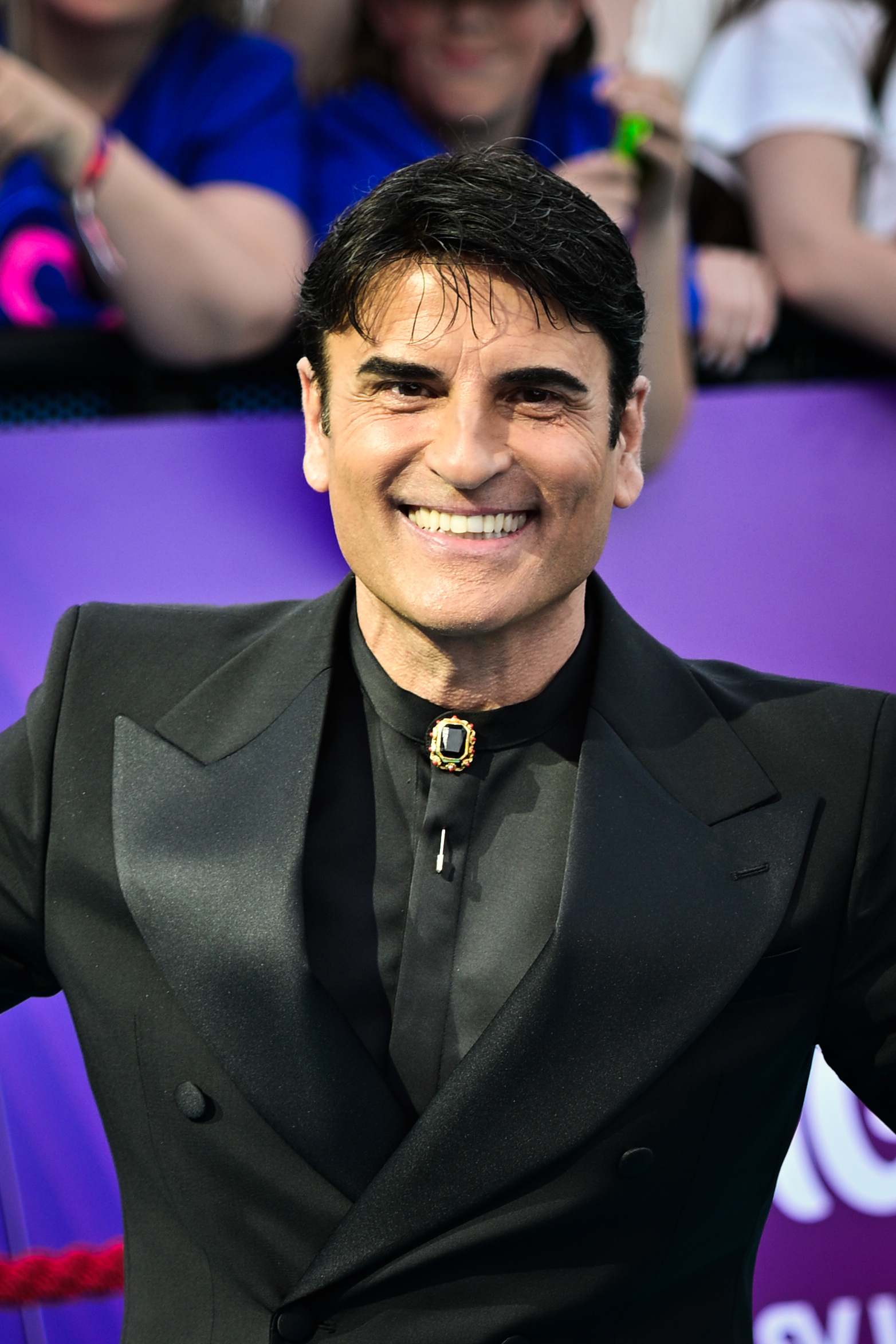
- Da Vinci at the Eurovision Song Contest 2026

Background information
- Born: Salvatore Michael Sorrentino; 7 April 1969 (age 57); New York City, U.S.
- Origin: Naples, Italy
- Genres: Pop; Neapolitan
- Occupations: Singer; songwriter; actor
- Instruments: Vocals; piano
- Years active: 1976–present
- Labels: Ariola; EMI; Compagnia Generale del Disco; Warner
- Spouse: Paola Pugliese (m. 1992)
- Website: saldavinci.it

Salvatore Michael Sorrentino (born 7 April 1969), known professionally as Sal Da Vinci (Italian: [ˈsal da ˈvintʃi]), is an American-born Italian singer, songwriter and actor, particularly known for his Neapolitan song repertory. As a songwriter, he has written for Ornella Vanoni and Renato Zero; he has also composed tracks with Gaetano Curreri, Pasquale Panella, and Roberto De Simone. He has been co-hosting the programme Pazzi di pizza with Fabio Esposito, airing on the Italian television channel Food Network since 2021.

Da Vinci won the Sanremo Music Festival 2026 with his song "Per sempre sì" and represented Italy in the Eurovision Song Contest 2026, finishing in fifth place.

== Biography ==
=== Early years ===
Sal Da Vinci was born in 1969 in New York City. His father, Mario Da Vinci (born Alfonso Sorrentino), a Neapolitan singer and actor, was on tour in the United States at the time and was later joined there by his wife, Nina. Sal grew up in Naples, specifically in the Mergellina area (Chiaia neighbourhood), in the commercial zone known as Torretta. He performed for the first time in front of a paying audience at just six years old.

=== 1976–1992: early career in music, cinema, and theatre ===
In 1976, he made his debut in the music world by recording the song "Miracolo 'e Natale" (by Alberto Sciotti and Tony Iglio) as a duet with his father; the song was later adapted into a sceneggiata (Neapolitan musical drama) of the same name. In 1977, alongside his father Mario, he debuted in the theatre with the sceneggiatas entitled Caro papà and Senza mamma e senza padre.

In 1978, he also made his cinema debut, again with his father Mario, in the movie Figlio mio sono innocente! by Carlo Caiano; the following year, he filmed a second movie, Napoli storia d'amore e di vendetta by Mario Bianchi. In 1979, he starred as the lead alongside his father Mario in the sceneggiata entitled 'O cunvento. In 1980, he took part in the movie Montevergine.

In 1981, Sal made his theatre debut with his father in 'A mamma. In 1982, he recorded his first album, O guappo nnammurato, for the La Canzonetta Record label; in addition to songs from the classical Neapolitan repertoire, he recorded the unreleased tracks "Lettera a Napoli" and "Meglio ca 'o ssaje" by Alberto Sciotti and Tony Iglio. That same year, he participated in the children's singing festival Ambrogino d'Oro with the song "Hai fatto buca!". In 1984, he starred in the musical movie Il motorino by Ninì Grassia, featuring his father Mario Da Vinci. That same year, he appeared in the theatre with his father in Tanti auguri and 'A bambulella.

In 1986, he appeared alongside Carlo Verdone and Alberto Sordi in the movie Troppo forte, playing the role of the "scugnizzo" (street kid) Capua. Over the years, he moved away from acting to dedicate himself more to music: his first experience in this direction was the recording of two tracks, "Guaglione" (written by Peppe Lanzetta and James Senese) and "Mannaggia e viva 'o rre" (written entirely by Senese), released by La Canzonetta Record.

=== 1992–2008: musical breakthrough ===
In 1992, he took part in the singing competition Una voce per Sanremo within the Sunday variety show Domenica in, hosted by Toto Cutugno and Alba Parietti. In 1994, he participated in the second and final edition of the Festival italiano (organized by Canale 5 and presented by Mike Bongiorno with Antonella Elia as an alternative to the Sanremo Music Festival), winning first place with the song "Vera". This track became the lead single of his first album released by Ricordi, entitled Sal Da Vinci.

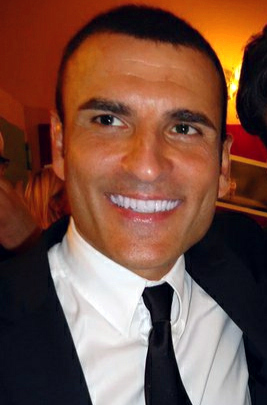
Sal Da Vinci in 2011

In 1995, he performed the Latin song "Salve Regina" by Francesco Palmieri in the presence of Pope John Paul II in Loreto, before a crowd of over 450,000 young people. That same year, he released the single "Fai come vuoi". In 1996, he released the single "Dimmi come fai", which preceded the album Un po' di noi. Meanwhile, his song "Vera" achieved massive success in South America under the title "Vida mi vida", covered by the Spanish artist Marcos Llunas, selling over 4 million copies worldwide. In 1998, he moved to the EMI label and recorded the album Solo. In 1999, he met Roberto De Simone, who cast him in the leading role of the Opera buffa del Giovedì Santo. This marked the play's return to the stage twenty years after its debut starring Concetta and Peppe Barra. The premiere took place on January 12, 2000, at the Teatro Metastasio in Prato, followed by a two-year tour of Italian theatres. On September 29 of the same year, MBO released a CD single, "Vurria saglire in cielo", based on an 18th-century archaic Neapolitan melodic theme by Roberto De Simone, a Neapolitan gospel with music by Sal Da Vinci and Gianni Guarracino and Italian lyrics by Maurizio Morante.

In 2002, the single "Oh Marì" was released, with music and lyrics by Roberto De Simone, rap sections by Joel and Sha-one, and arrangements by Raffaele Minale. From March 2002 to February 2007, he returned to acting in the musical C'era una volta... Scugnizzi, written by Claudio Mattone and Enrico Vaime. The musical received prestigious awards, including the 2003 Theatre Oscar from the ETI (Ente Teatrale Italiano) as the best musical of the year. In 2004, he collaborated with Lucio Dalla, Gigi D'Alessio, and Gigi Finizio on the song "Napule", which was included in Gigi D'Alessio's album Quanti amori.

For the 2005-2006 and 2006-2007 theatrical seasons, he took part in the musical theatre project Anime napoletane, created and produced by Claudio and Tullio Mattone for Napoliteatro; in the show, he performed Neapolitan songs reimagined in a modern key, interspersed with spoken performances by Pietro Pignatelli. An eponymous album containing 14 ancient and modern Neapolitan classics was released alongside the show. In 2005, he co-wrote the songs "Per averti" and "A modo mio" with Gigi Finizio and Marco Fasano for the album Per averti.

In 2008, he released the single "Nnammuratè", written with Vincenzo D'Agostino as part of the album Canto per amore. The album was tied to a theatrical show running from November 6, 2008, to March 15, 2009, directed and choreographed by Gino Landi. That same year, he appeared as a regular singer on the Saturday night variety show Volami nel cuore, hosted by Pupo and Ernesto Schinella.

=== 2009–2023: first participation in the Sanremo Music Festival and theatrical activities ===
In February 2009, he participated in the 59th Sanremo Music Festival with the song "Non riesco a farti innamorare", co-written with Vincenzo D'Agostino and Gigi D'Alessio; he finished in third place at the end of the event.

The album reached 19th place on the FIMI charts and was promoted by an eponymous summer tour that ran from April to October, including a performance at the Arena Flegrea on June 5. On March 19, 2010, his record Il mercante di stelle was released. The album consists of three unreleased tracks: "Il mercante di stelle" (written with Depsa), "Orologio senza tempo" (written with Vincenzo D'Agostino), and "Famme vedé" (written entirely by him), with arrangements by Adriano Pennino. It also features seven Italian and international classics, arranged by Maurizio Bosnia. The album reached 20th place on the FIMI charts and served as the lead-in for the theatrical show Io + voi = noi, which ran until the early months of 2012.

Also in May 2011, he starred in the two-act musical production Napoli: chi resta e chi parte by Giuseppe Patroni Griffi, based on Raffaele Viviani's Caffè di notte e giorno and Scalo marittimo, directed by Armando Pugliese with arrangements by Adriano Pennino. 2012 marked the artist's return to the music scene. Indeed, starting March 23, the single "Fin dove c'è vita" entered radio rotation, anticipating the release of the new studio album È così che gira il mondo, which debuted at 12th place on the FIMI charts.

In December 2014, he debuted at the Teatro Augusteo in Naples with Stelle a metà, a musical whose songs were written by Sal in collaboration with Alessandro Siani. In 2015, he collaborated with Siani again on the score for the movie Si accettano miracoli, directed by Siani himself. On August 19 of the same year, he performed in concert in Sapri for 7th Sapri anni 60 Festival.

=== 2024–present: recent success, Sanremo and Eurovision ===
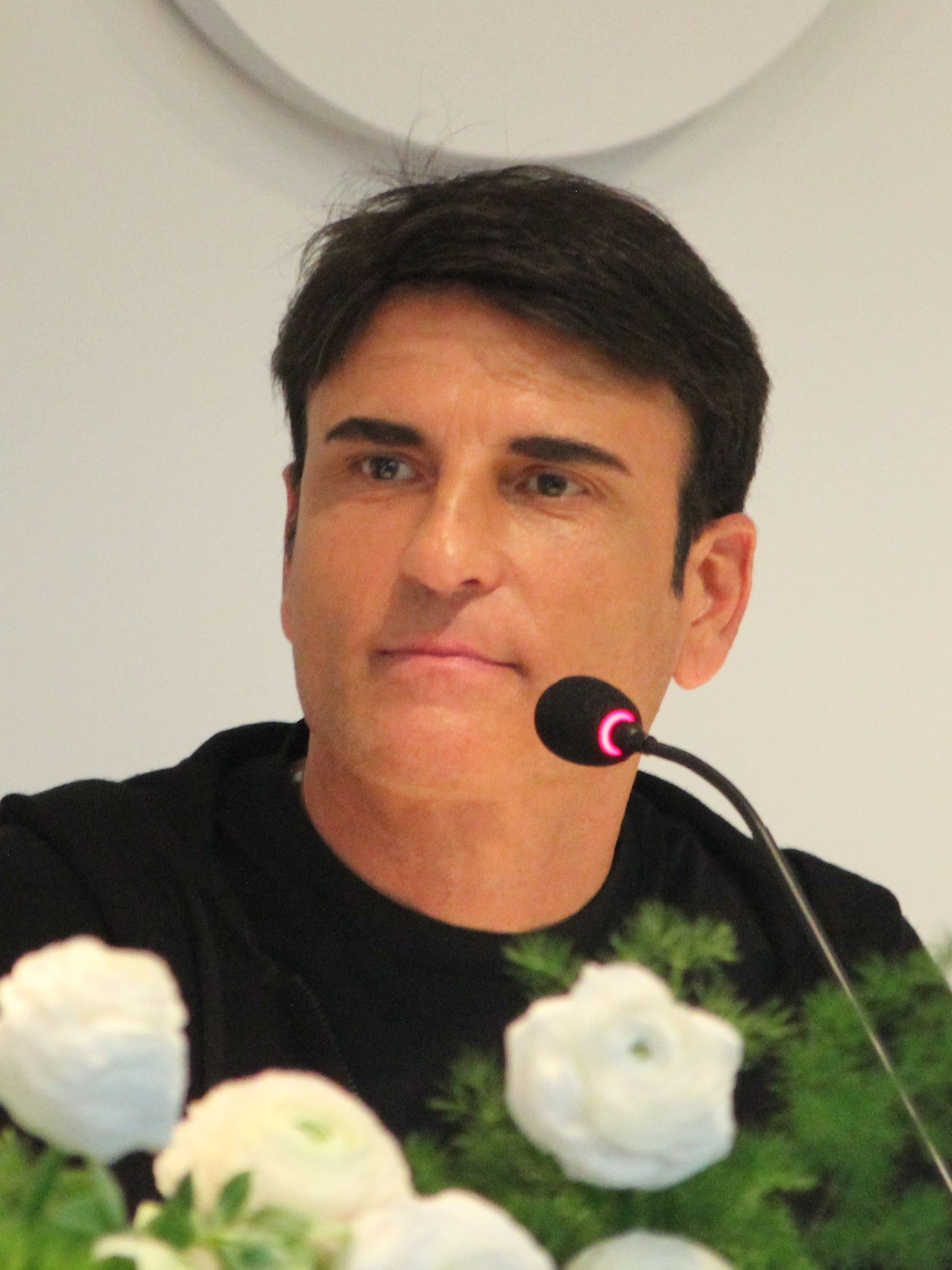
Da Vinci during the Sanremo Music Festival 2026

In the summer of 2024, he released the new single "Rossetto e caffè", written with Luca Barbato and Vincenzo D'Agostino, which was certified double platinum. In December, the release of the single "Non è vero che sto bene" followed.

On February 14, 2025, he participated in the 75th Sanremo Music Festival as a guest during the fourth night (dedicated to covers), where he performed his single "Rossetto e caffè" alongside the competing group The Kolors, finishing in tenth place. On May 16, the single "L'amore e tu" was released. On August 11, it was announced that he had joined Warner Music Italy. During the months of September and October, he became one of the coaches on the talent show Io canto Family, broadcast on Canale 5 and hosted by Michelle Hunziker.

On 28 February 2026, he returned to the 76th Sanremo Music Festival as a contestant with the song "Per sempre sì", with which he won and earned the right to represent Italy in the Eurovision Song Contest 2026. He finished 5th with 281 points.

== Personal life ==
Da Vinci has been married to Paola Pugliese since 1992. They have two children: Francesco (born 1993) and Annachiara "AnnaKiara" (born 1998). He has three grandchildren: Salvatore and Nina, children of Francesco, and Antonio, son of Annachiara and her husband Salvatore Santoro.

== Discography ==
=== Studio albums ===
List of studio albums with selected details
Title	Details	Peak chart positions	Certifications
Title	Details	ITA	Certifications
Miracolo 'e Natale (with Mario Da Vinci)	Released: 1976; Label: Bella Record (BRLP 10035)	—	—
Mario & Sal Da Vinci Vol. 1º (with Mario Da Vinci)	Released: 1977; Label: Bella Record (BRLP 10036)	—	—
Mario & Sal Da Vinci Vol. 2º (with Mario Da Vinci)	Released: 1977; Label: Bella Record (BRLP 10038)	—	—
'O scugnizzo e 'o signore (with Mario Da Vinci)	Released: 1977; Label: Bella Record (BRLP 10038)	—	—
'O giurnalaio / 'A cummunione 'e Salvatore	Released: 1978; Label: Bella Record (BRLP 10039)	—	—
Vasame ancora (with Mario Da Vinci)	Released: 1979; Label: Dominant Record (LPD 33002)	—	—
Muntevergine (Mamma Schiavona) (with Mario Da Vinci)	Released: 1980	—	—
'A giostra	Released: 1980	—	—
'O guappo nnammurato	Released: 1981; Label: La Canzonetta (FDM 507)	—	—
'O motorino (with Mario Da Vinci)	Released: 1981; Label: La Canzonetta (FDM 510)	—	—
Annabella (with Mario Da Vinci)	Released: 1982; Label: La Canzonetta (FDM 519)	—	—
Footing (with Mario Da Vinci)	Released: 1983; Label: La Canzonetta (FDM 522)	—	—
Sal Da Vinci	Released: 1994	—	—
Un po' di noi	Released: 1996	—	—
Solo	Released: 1998	—	—
C'era una volta... Scugnizzi (with Gianni Lanni, Massimiliano Gallo, Stefania De Francesco and various artists)	Released: 2005	—	—
Anime Napoletane	Released: 2005	—	—
Canto per amore	Released: 2008	94	—
Non riesco a farti innamorare	Released: 2009	17	—
Napoli chi resta e chi parte (with Lalla Esposito, Fiorenza Calogero and various artists)	Released: 2011	—	—
È così che gira il mondo	Released: 2012; Label: Sony Music	12	—
Carosone, l'americano di Napoli (with Forlenzo Massarone, Pietro Botte, Giovanni Imparato and Gransta MSV)	Released: 2013	—	—
Se amore è	Released: 2014	12	—
Non si fanno prigionieri	Released: 2016	47	—
Siamo gocce di mare	Released: 2021	—	—

=== Soundtrack albums ===
Year	FIlm title	Song/Album
2006	Ti lascio perché ti amo troppo	Performed song "Accuminciammo a respirà" and composed the soundtrack
2015	Si accettano miracoli	Performed song "Tu stella mia"
2015	Con il bene di sempre	Composed the soundtrack

== Filmography ==
=== Film ===
Year	Title	Role	Notes
1978	Figlio mio sono innocente!	Salvatore	Directed by Carlo Caiano
1979	Napoli una storia d'amore e di vendetta	Salvatore	Directed by Mario Bianchi
1984	Il motorino	Salvatore Esposito	Directed by Ninì Grassia
1986	Troppo forte	Capua	Directed by Carlo Verdone
2016	Vita, cuore, battito	Don Sal	Directed by Sergio Colabona

Awards and achievements
Preceded by Olly	Sanremo Music Festival; Winner; 2026	Succeeded by TBD
Preceded by Lucio Corsi with "Volevo essere un duro"	Italy in the Eurovision Song Contest; 2026	Succeeded by TBD
