= Franco Del Prete =

Italian drummer (1943–2020)

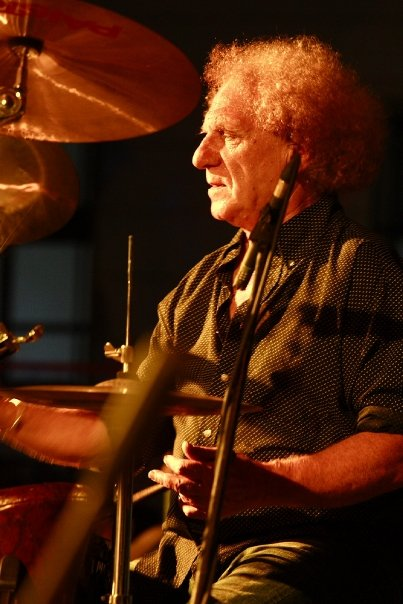
- Del Prete in 2009
- Born: 5 November 1943; Frattamaggiore, Kingdom of Italy
- Died: 13 February 2020 (aged 76); Naples, Italy
- Occupation: Musician

Franco Del Prete (5 November 1943 – 13 February 2020) was an Italian drummer and lyricist.

== Biography ==
Born in Frattamaggiore, Del Prete was one of the founders of the groups The Showmen, Napoli Centrale, and Sud Express. He also worked as a lyricist for Lucio Dalla, Peppino di Capri, James Senese, Eduardo De Crescenzo, Tullio De Piscopo, Enzo Avitabile and Sal da Vinci.

== Discography ==
=== With The Showmen ===
- The Showmen (1969)
- Showmen 2 (1972)

=== With Napoli Centrale ===
- Napoli Centrale (1975)
- Mattanza (1976)
- Qualcosa ca nu' mmore (1978)
- Zitte! Sta venenn' 'o mammone (2001)
- 'O sanghe (2016)

=== With Sud Express ===
- L'ultimo apache (2009)
- La chiave (2018)

=== Collaborations ===
- Ha tutte le carte in regola (with Gino Paoli) (1980)
- Cante jondo (with Eduardo De Crescenzo) (1991)
- Danza danza (with Eduardo De Crescenzo) (1993)
- Sal da Vinci (with Sal da Vinci) (1994)
- Un po' di noi (with Sal da Vinci) (1996)
- Solo (with Sal da Vinci) (1998)
- Fase 3 (with Peppino di Capri) (2001)
- Radice (with Enzo Gragnianiello and Sud Express) (2011)
