= Comme facette mammeta =

Song composed by Salvatore Gambardella with lyrics by Giuseppe Capaldo

"Comme facette mammeta" is a song published in 1906 by Salvatore Gambardella and Giuseppe Capaldo, whose title may be translated as "How your mother did it". The song is about a boyfriend telling his girlfriend the recipe that her mother used to make her, like “a basket full of strawberries from the garden, apples, sugar and cinnamon to knead her beautiful lips”

== Lyrics ==
When your mother made you
do you want to know how she knead this beautiful flesh?
Everything she put in
Hundred roses mixed in the mortar
Milk roses, roses and milk she made you on the spot
And there's no need for the gypsy to guess, Concetta
How your mother did it I know it better than you

And to make this beautiful mouth, she didn't need the same amount
Do you want to know what she put in? Now I'll tell you everything
A basket full of strawberries from the garden
Apples, sugar and cinnamon to make this beautiful mouth
And there's no need for the gypsy to guess, Concetta
How your mother did it I know it better than you

And to make these golden braids your mother went bankrupt
My darling you want money but I'll tell you what was used
A whole goldmine turned into filigree
That's what it took to make those priceless braids
And there's no need for the gypsy to guess, Concetta
How your mother did it I know it better than you

== Recordings ==
- Mario Lanza in 1961 (see Mario Lanza discography)
- Sergio Franchi (see List of songs recorded by Sergio Franchi)
- Renzo Arbore with L'Orchestra Italiana. This version was played throughout the opening credits and introductory scene of the film OK Garage.
- As performed by Pietra Montecorvino in the 2010 film Passione
- Muslim Magomayev "The Russian Sinatra" in Neapolitan Songs (1969) album published on Melodiya
- Instrumental version by Xavier Cugat in his 2016 compilation Seven Classic Albums (Real Gone Music Company, RGMCD-235)

== See also ==
"Comme facette mammeta" in the Italian Wikipedia.
