= Tiago Salazar =

Tiago Salazar (born 1972) is a Portuguese writer and journalist, also noted for being a diligent traveler. He was born in Lisbon in 1972 and studied for a degree in international relations. Since early, Salazar wrote for several newspapers and magazines like Diário de Notícias, Expresso and Correio da Manhã. He has also worked for television (Endereço Desconhecido, travelling documentary, RTP 2). He was married to singer Cristina Branco radicated in the Netherlands. The couple who have two daughters, endured a complex litigation process with the Portuguese tax office and moved their tax address to the Netherlands in order to take advantage of the favorable tax environment there. By 2016, Salazar was driving a tuk-tuk for tourists in Lisbon in order to make a living. The couple got divorced in 2018.

== Published books ==
- Viagens Sentimentais (2007)
- A Casa do Mundo (2008)
- As Rotas do Sonho (2010)
- Endereço Desconhecido (2011)
- Hei-de Amar-te Mais (2013)
- Crónica da Selva (2014)
- O Baú Contador de Histórias (2014)
- Quo Vadis, Salazar? (2015)
- A Escada de Istambul (2016)
- O Moturista Accidental (2017)
- A Orelha Negra (2017)
- A Fala-Barata (2020)
