= Napoli Centrale (band) =

Italian jazz-rock group

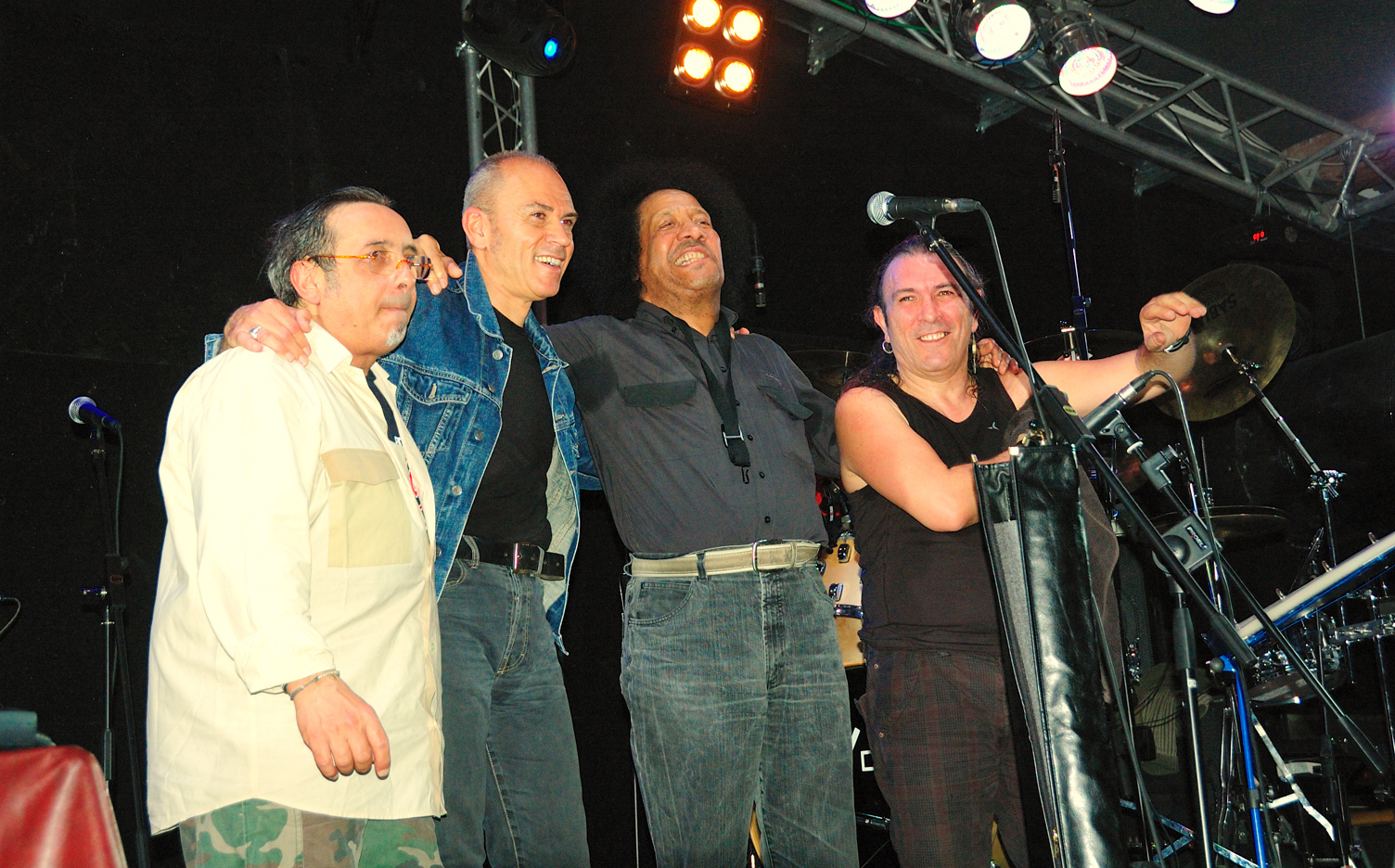
- Napoli Centrale in 2010

Background information
- Origin: Naples, Campania, Italy
- Genres: Folk, jazz-rock, jazz fusion, progressive rock
- Years active: 1974–present
- Labels: Dischi Ricordi, Orizzonte, BMG Ricordi S.p.A.
- Members: Marco De Domenico; Rino Calabritto; Fredy Malfi
- Past members: Franco Del Prete; Mark Harris; Tony Walmsley; Bruno Biriaco; Ciro Ciscognetti; Pino Daniele; Pippo Guarnera; Kelvin Bullen; Savio Riccardi; Gigi De Rienzo; Agostino Marangolo; Lester Bowie; Famoudou Don Moye; Enrico Quaranta; Ernesto Vitolo; Ciccio Merolla; James Senese

Napoli Centrale is an Italian jazz-progressive rock group, founded in Naples in 1975.

== History ==
The musical project was founded by musicians James Senese and Franco Del Prete, who following the disbandment of their previous R&B band The Showmen (later known as Showmen 2) wanted to pursue a different musical path. The style of the band is characterized by a mixture between rock, folk, jazz and blues, with lyrics in Neapolitan language which often deal with social themes. The group got an immediate commercial and critical success with its first eponymous album and its first single "Campagna", representing a significant exception to the other successful Italian bands of the time, either dedicated to progressive rock or characterized by a melodic and romantic repertoire.

Shortly after the release of their first album, bassist Tony Walmsley and keyboardist Mark Harris left the band to join Il Rovescio della Medaglia, and it started a period of numerous lineup changes, which also briefly saw Pino Daniele as bassist. In the early 1980s Senese pursued a solo career, putting the band on hiatus. Senese reconstituted the band in the early 1990s, with Savio Riccardi, Gigi De Rienzo and Agostino Marangolo. In 1992 they released their comeback album Jesceallah, in which Art Ensemble of Chicago members Lester Bowie and Don Moye collaborated.

== Discography ==
Album

- 1975 – Napoli Centrale (Dischi Ricordi, SMRL 6159)
- 1976 – Mattanza (Dischi Ricordi, SMRL 6187)
- 1977 – Qualcosa ca nu’ mmore (Dischi Ricordi, SMRL 6224)
- 1992 – Jesceallah (Blue Angel, BAR 40592)[3]
- 1994 – ’Ngazzate nire (Blue Angel, FDM 70494)[3]
- 2001 – Zitte! Sta venenn’ ’o mammone (Sony, PDG 5030512)
- 2016 – 'O sanghe (Ala Bianca/Warner Music, RNR 128554132-2)
- 2018 – Aspettanno ‘o tiempo (River Nile Records, RNR 128554197–1)
