= Rossetto e caffè =

2024 song by Sal Da Vinci

Single by Sal Da Vinci
- Language: Italian; Neapolitan
- Released: 14 June 2024
- Genre: Pop
- Length: 3:12
- Label: Cose Production
- Composer: Luca Barbato
- Lyricists: Vincenzo D'Agostino; Sal Da Vinci
- Producer: Adriano Pennino

Sal Da Vinci singles chronology
"Segui il cuore" (2023)	"Rossetto e caffè" (2024)	"Non è vero che sto bene" (2024)

Music video
- "Rossetto e caffè" on YouTube

"Rossetto e caffè" (English: "Lipstick and Coffee") is a song by the Italian singer Sal Da Vinci, released on 14 June 2024.

== Description ==
The song, released as a single on June 14, 2024, anticipated the release of a studio album originally scheduled for the following autumn. The music video of the song is filmed on the Sorrento coast. The director of the latter is Giuseppe Marco Albano, and it features Martina Stella. The text is bilingual (Italian and Neapolitan) and describes desire, passion and love. The song also anticipated the tour of Sal Da Vinci UniverSaltour, which started from Portici, the proceeds of which were donated to the Catholic association Emanuele Onlus to build a shelter in Messina, in the coastal hamlet of Giampilieri Marina, where children will be welcomed.

== Commercial success ==
The song went viral on TikTok. It also garnered a gold record certification, attained 23 million YouTube views, and 13 million Spotify streams.

== Charts ==
=== Weekly charts ===
Chart (2024)	Peak position
Italy (FIMI)	3

=== Year-end charts ===
Year-end chart performance for "Rossetto e caffè"
Chart	Year	Position
Italy (FIMI)	2024	38
Italy (FIMI)	2025	28
