= Italy in the Eurovision Song Contest 2026 =

- Eurovision Song Contest 2026
- Participating broadcaster: Radiotelevisione italiana (RAI)
- Country: Italy
- Selection process: Sanremo Music Festival 2026
- Selection date: 28 February 2026

Competing entry
- Song: "Per sempre sì"
- Artist: Sal Da Vinci
- Songwriters: Alessandro La Cava; Eugenio Maimone; Francesco Sorrentino; Federica Abbate; Federico Mercuri; Giordano Cremona; Salvatore Michael Sorrentino

Placement
- Final result: 5th, 281 points

Participation chronology

Italy was represented at the Eurovision Song Contest 2026 with the song "Per sempre sì", written by Alessandro La Cava, Eugenio Maimone, Francesco Sorrentino, Federica Abbate, Federico Mercuri, Giordano Cremona and Salvatore Michael Sorrentino, and performed by Sorrentino under his stage name Sal Da Vinci. The Italian participating broadcaster, Radiotelevisione italiana (RAI), selected its entry for the contest through the Sanremo Music Festival 2026.

As a member of the "Big Four", Italy automatically qualifies to compete in the final of the Eurovision Song Contest.

== Background ==
Prior to the 2026 contest, Radiotelevisione italiana (RAI) had participated in the Eurovision Song Contest representing Italy forty-nine times since its first entry at the inaugural contest in 1956. Since then, it has won the contest on three occasions: in 1964 with the song "Non ho l'età" performed by Gigliola Cinquetti, in 1990 with "Insieme: 1992" by Toto Cutugno, and in 2021 with "Zitti e buoni" by Måneskin. RAI has withdrawn from the contest a number of times, with its most recent absence spanning from 1998 until 2010. It made its return in 2011, with its entry "Madness of Love" performed by Raphael Gualazzi, placing second — its highest result, to that point, since its victory in 1990. A number of top 10 placements followed in subsequent editions, including its third victory in 2021. In 2025, it placed fifth with "Volevo essere un duro" performed by Lucio Corsi.

As part of its duties as participating broadcaster, RAI organises the selection of its entry in the Eurovision Song Contest and broadcasts the event in the country. Almost every year since 2011, RAI has regularly used the Sanremo Music Festival to select its entrant to the contest, at first through an intermediate stage of internal selection among the contestants, and after 2014 (when a full internal selection took place), the winner of the festival has always earned the right of first refusal to represent Italy in the Eurovision Song Contest.

== Before Eurovision ==
=== Sanremo Music Festival 2026 ===
RAI organised the Sanremo Music Festival 2026, the 76th edition of the event, between 24 and 28 February 2026. On 16 October 2025, the broadcaster published the rules of the competition, confirming that the winner of the festival's Big Artists section would earn the right to represent Italy in the Eurovision Song Contest.

30 artists competed in the Big Artists section over the course of five consecutive nights, selected by the artistic director Carlo Conti by direct invitation and from public submissions, and their names were announced on 30 November 2025. Two former Italian Eurovision entrants were among the competing artists: Raf (1987) and Ermal Meta (2018).

==== Final ====
The final took place on 28 February 2026. After performing across four nights, all competing artists performed their songs one final time. The results from the public televoting (34%), radio jury voting (33%), and press jury voting (33%) were summed up to the results obtained in the previous nights to determine the five qualifiers for the superfinal round. The winner was Sal Da Vinci with his song "Per sempre sì". The following morning, Da Vinci confirmed his participation in Eurovision, unlike the winner of the previous edition, Olly.

Superfinal – 28 February 2026
| R/O | Artist | Song | Provisional ranking | Second round rankings | | | | Total score | Final ranking |
| R/O | Artist | Song | Provisional ranking | Radio jury | Press jury | Televote | | Total score | Final ranking |
| R/O | Artist | Song | Provisional ranking | Radio jury | Press jury | % | Place | Total score | Final ranking |
|---|---|---|---|---|---|---|---|---|---|
| 1 | Fedez and Marco Masini | "Male necessario" | 5 | 4 | 5 | 11.9% | 5 | 16.5% | 5 |
| 2 | Arisa | "Magica favola" | 2 | 5 | 2 | 19.2% | 3 | 18.9% | 4 |
| 3 | Ditonellapiaga | "Che fastidio!" | 4 | 1 | 1 | 18.9% | 4 | 20.6% | 3 |
| 4 | Sal Da Vinci | "Per sempre sì" | 1 | 2 | 4 | 23.6% | 2 | 22.2% | 1 |
| 5 | Sayf | "Tu mi piaci tanto" | 3 | 3 | 3 | 26.4% | 1 | 21.9% | 2 |

== At Eurovision ==
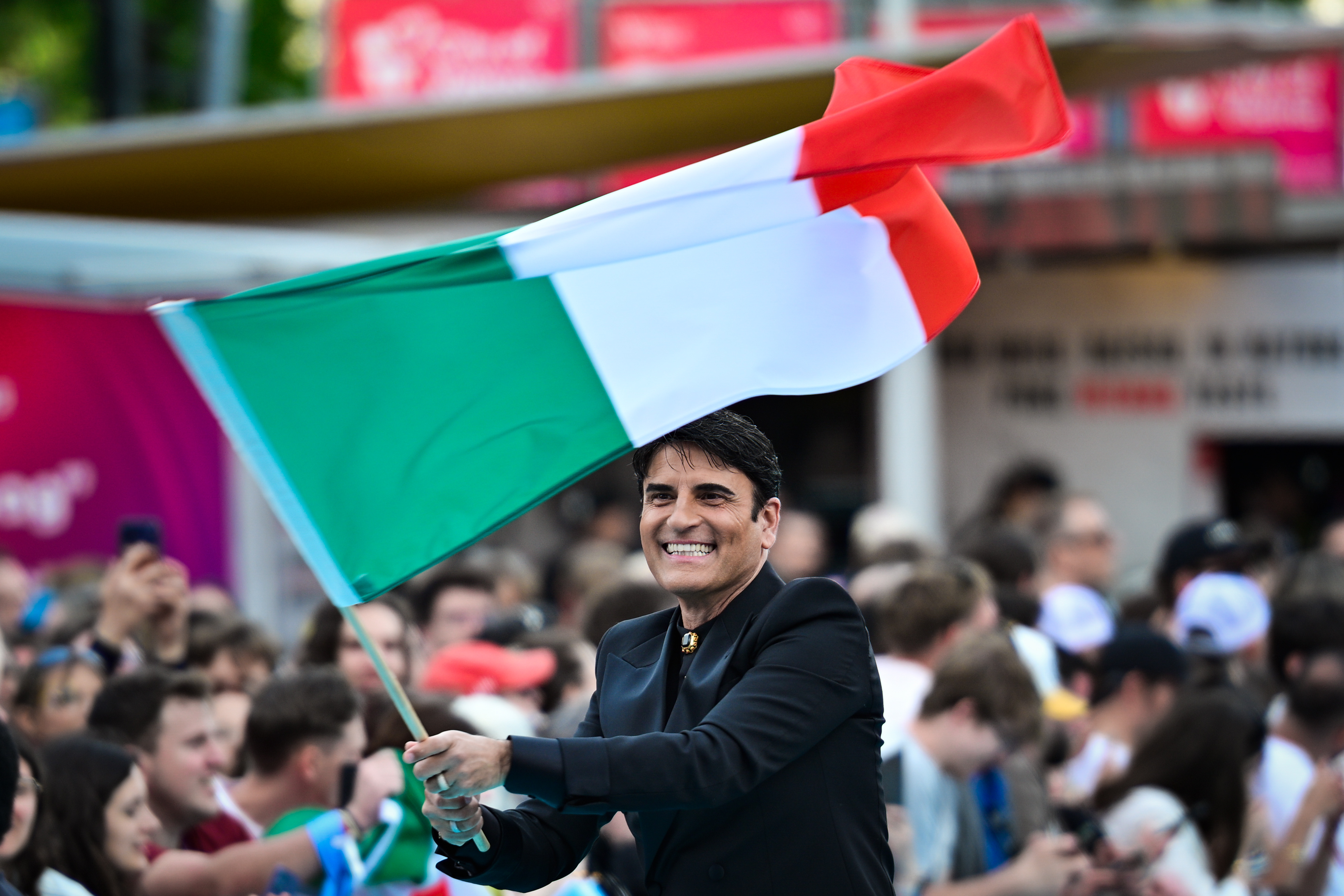
Sal Da Vinci during the "Turquoise Carpet" for Eurovision 2026

The Eurovision Song Contest 2026 took place at the Wiener Stadthalle in Vienna, Austria, and consisted of two semi-finals held on the respective dates of 12 and 14 May and the final on 16 May 2026. All nations with the exceptions of the host country and the "Big Four" (France, Germany, Italy, and the United Kingdom) were required to qualify from one of two semi-finals in order to compete in the final; the top ten countries from each semi-final progressed to the final. As a member of the "Big Four", Italy automatically qualified to compete in the final on 16 May 2026, but was also required to broadcast and vote in one of the two semi-finals. This was decided via a draw held during the semi-final allocation draw on 12 January 2026, when it was announced that Italy would be voting in the first semi-final. Despite being an automatic qualifier for the final, the Italian entry was also performed during the semi-final.

=== Final ===
Italy performed in 22nd place and finished 5th overall with 281 points.

=== Voting ===
==== Points awarded to Italy ====
Points awarded to Italy (Final)
| Score | Televote | Jury |
|---|---|---|
| 12 points | Albania; Malta | Albania; Azerbaijan |
| 10 points | Croatia; Switzerland | Georgia; Germany; Malta; San Marino; Serbia |
| 8 points | Lithuania; San Marino | France |
| 7 points | Greece; Israel; Luxembourg; Moldova; Romania | |
| 6 points | Austria; Estonia; Germany; Montenegro; Serbia | Belgium; Bulgaria; Denmark; Estonia |
| 5 points | Finland; France | Norway |
| 4 points | Belgium | Ukraine |
| 3 points | Cyprus; Portugal | Finland; Israel; Montenegro; Sweden |
| 2 points | | Austria; Poland |
| 1 point | Bulgaria; Latvia | Australia; Cyprus; Moldova |

==== Points awarded by Italy ====
Points awarded by Italy (Semi-final 1)
| Score | Televote | Jury |
|---|---|---|
| 12 points | Moldova | Belgium |
| 10 points | Israel | Sweden |
| 8 points | San Marino | Poland |
| 7 points | Serbia | Lithuania |
| 6 points | Poland | Estonia |
| 5 points | Croatia | Moldova |
| 4 points | Finland | San Marino |
| 3 points | Greece | Finland |
| 2 points | Montenegro | Portugal |
| 1 point | Lithuania | Croatia |

Points awarded by Italy (Final)
| Score | Televote | Jury |
|---|---|---|
| 12 points | Moldova | Belgium |
| 10 points | Romania | Sweden |
| 8 points | Israel | Malta |
| 7 points | Albania | Ukraine |
| 6 points | Ukraine | Poland |
| 5 points | Bulgaria | Romania |
| 4 points | Greece | Germany |
| 3 points | Finland | Bulgaria |
| 2 points | Poland | Lithuania |
| 1 point | Australia | Moldova |

==== Detailed voting results ====
Each participating broadcaster assembles a seven-member jury panel consisting of music industry professionals who are citizens of the country they represent and two of which have to be between 18 and 25 years old. Each jury, and individual jury member, is required to meet a strict set of criteria regarding professional background, as well as diversity in gender and age. No member of a national jury was permitted to be related in any way to any of the competing acts in such a way that they cannot vote impartially and independently. The individual rankings of each jury member as well as the nation's televoting results were released shortly after the grand final.

The following members comprised the Italian jury:

- Angelo Bonello
- Enrico Cremonesi
- Roberto Paulillo
- Angelica Bove
- Dalila Frassanito
- Giorgia Belfiore
- Nicol Angelozzi

Detailed voting results from Italy (Semi-final 1)
| R/O | Country | Jury | | | | | | | | | Televote | | |
| R/O | Country | Juror A | Juror B | Juror C | Juror D | Juror E | Juror F | Juror G | Rank | Points | Percentage | Rank | Points |
|---|---|---|---|---|---|---|---|---|---|---|---|---|---|
| 01 | Moldova | 5 | 13 | 5 | 6 | 2 | 7 | 9 | 6 | 5 | 31.39% | 1 | 12 |
| 02 | Sweden | 1 | 6 | 6 | 2 | 4 | 1 | 2 | 2 | 10 | 1.98% | 11 | |
| 03 | Croatia | 7 | 12 | 9 | 4 | 7 | 13 | 13 | 10 | 1 | 3.83% | 6 | 5 |
| 04 | Greece | 14 | 14 | 13 | 10 | 8 | 9 | 7 | 13 | | 3.48% | 8 | 3 |
| 05 | Portugal | 4 | 11 | 10 | 7 | 12 | 10 | 8 | 9 | 2 | 1.40% | 14 | |
| 06 | Georgia | 12 | 15 | 15 | 15 | 13 | 14 | 11 | 15 | | 1.80% | 12 | |
| 07 | Finland | 11 | 9 | 7 | 12 | 6 | 6 | 5 | 8 | 3 | 3.65% | 7 | 4 |
| 08 | Montenegro | 13 | 8 | 8 | 13 | 9 | 5 | 14 | 11 | | 2.91% | 9 | 2 |
| 09 | Estonia | 8 | 3 | 11 | 9 | 15 | 4 | 1 | 5 | 6 | 1.38% | 15 | |
| 10 | Israel | 10 | 7 | 14 | 8 | 10 | 12 | 10 | 12 | | 24.13% | 2 | 10 |
| 11 | Belgium | 2 | 1 | 3 | 1 | 5 | 2 | 4 | 1 | 12 | 1.52% | 13 | |
| 12 | Lithuania | 6 | 5 | 2 | 3 | 1 | 11 | 3 | 4 | 7 | 2.00% | 10 | 1 |
| 13 | San Marino | 9 | 4 | 4 | 11 | 11 | 8 | 6 | 7 | 4 | 10.86% | 3 | 8 |
| 14 | Poland | 3 | 2 | 1 | 5 | 3 | 3 | 12 | 3 | 8 | 4.65% | 5 | 6 |
| 15 | Serbia | 15 | 10 | 12 | 14 | 14 | 15 | 15 | 14 | | 5.01% | 4 | 7 |

Detailed voting results from Italy (Final)
| R/O | Country | Jury | | | | | | | | | Televote | | |
| R/O | Country | Juror A | Juror B | Juror C | Juror D | Juror E | Juror F | Juror G | Rank | Points | Percentage | Rank | Points |
|---|---|---|---|---|---|---|---|---|---|---|---|---|---|
| 01 | Denmark | 16 | 8 | 7 | 17 | 15 | 10 | 15 | 13 | | 1.06% | 16 | |
| 02 | Germany | 19 | 3 | 15 | 5 | 14 | 3 | 16 | 7 | 4 | 1.08% | 15 | |
| 03 | Israel | 6 | 11 | 22 | 12 | 5 | 23 | 11 | 11 | | 11.37% | 3 | 8 |
| 04 | Belgium | 1 | 1 | 3 | 3 | 1 | 1 | 1 | 1 | 12 | 0.52% | 23 | |
| 05 | Albania | 20 | 7 | 14 | 22 | 18 | 6 | 17 | 15 | | 10.59% | 4 | 7 |
| 06 | Greece | 15 | 24 | 13 | 13 | 24 | 14 | 23 | 20 | | 2.87% | 7 | 4 |
| 07 | Ukraine | 3 | 16 | 2 | 4 | 6 | 5 | 10 | 4 | 7 | 10.21% | 5 | 6 |
| 08 | Australia | 21 | 2 | 23 | 15 | 12 | 16 | 12 | 12 | | 2.02% | 10 | 1 |
| 09 | Serbia | 24 | 23 | 24 | 24 | 17 | 22 | 24 | 24 | | 1.75% | 12 | |
| 10 | Malta | 2 | 17 | 1 | 2 | 9 | 12 | 6 | 3 | 8 | 1.48% | 14 | |
| 11 | Czechia | 12 | 14 | 10 | 19 | 8 | 19 | 9 | 14 | | 0.80% | 20 | |
| 12 | Bulgaria | 4 | 10 | 6 | 10 | 11 | 9 | 7 | 8 | 3 | 7.45% | 6 | 5 |
| 13 | Croatia | 22 | 22 | 21 | 23 | 16 | 24 | 19 | 23 | | 1.92% | 11 | |
| 14 | United Kingdom | 18 | 21 | 20 | 14 | 21 | 18 | 13 | 21 | | 0.48% | 24 | |
| 15 | France | 17 | 15 | 16 | 16 | 13 | 7 | 8 | 16 | | 1.62% | 13 | |
| 16 | Moldova | 8 | 20 | 11 | 9 | 20 | 13 | 4 | 10 | 1 | 21.98% | 1 | 12 |
| 17 | Finland | 14 | 5 | 19 | 11 | 23 | 20 | 18 | 19 | | 2.36% | 8 | 3 |
| 18 | Poland | 5 | 4 | 4 | 8 | 10 | 4 | 5 | 5 | 6 | 2.16% | 9 | 2 |
| 19 | Lithuania | 9 | 13 | 5 | 6 | 19 | 8 | 20 | 9 | 2 | 0.60% | 21 | |
| 20 | Sweden | 7 | 6 | 8 | 1 | 2 | 2 | 2 | 2 | 10 | 0.92% | 19 | |
| 21 | Cyprus | 23 | 19 | 18 | 18 | 22 | 21 | 21 | 22 | | 0.99% | 18 | |
| 22 | Italy | | | | | | | | | | | | |
| 23 | Norway | 10 | 12 | 12 | 20 | 7 | 17 | 14 | 17 | | 1.06% | 17 | |
| 24 | Romania | 11 | 9 | 9 | 7 | 3 | 11 | 3 | 6 | 5 | 14.14% | 2 | 10 |
| 25 | Austria | 13 | 18 | 17 | 21 | 4 | 15 | 22 | 18 | | 0.55% | 22 | |
