= Per sempre sì =

2026 song by Sal Da Vinci

Single by Sal Da Vinci

from the album Per sempre sì
- Language: Italian; Neapolitan
- Released: 25 February 2026
- Genre: Disco; funk; neomelodic
- Length: 2:54
- Label: Atlantic; Warner
- Composers: Salvatore Michael Sorrentino; Alessandro La Cava; Federica Abbate; Federico Mercuri; Giordano Cremona; Eugenio Maimone
- Lyricists: Francesco Sorrentino; Alessandro La Cava; Federica Abbate
- Producers: ITACA; Adriano Pennino

Sal Da Vinci singles chronology
"L'amore e tu" (2025)	"Per sempre sì" (2026)	"Cinque giorni" (2026)

Music video
- "Per sempre sì" on YouTube

Eurovision Song Contest 2026 entry
- Country: Italy
- Artist: Sal Da Vinci
- Languages: Italian; Neapolitan
- Composers: Salvatore Michael Sorrentino; Alessandro La Cava; Federica Abbate; Federico Mercuri; Giordano Cremona; Eugenio Maimone
- Lyricists: Francesco Sorrentino; Alessandro La Cava; Federica Abbate

Finals performance
- Final result: 5th
- Final points: 281

Entry chronology
- ◄ "Volevo essere un duro" (2025)

"Per sempre sì" (Italian pronunciation: [per ˈsɛmpre ˈsi]; "Forever Yes") is a song co-written and recorded by Italian singer Sal Da Vinci. It was released on 25 February 2026 through Atlantic and Warner Music Italy during Sanremo Music Festival 2026. After winning Sanremo, it represented Italy at the Eurovision Song Contest 2026 and finished in fifth place. The song reached number two on the Italian singles chart, becoming his highest charting entry there, and also reached the top ten in Lithuania.

== Overview ==
According to Da Vinci himself, the song is intended to be a hymn to universal love: "a declaration of love that knows no boundaries, labels, or barriers, capable of speaking to everyone, regardless of age, orientation, or personal history. [...] What I hope for is freedom for all. Freedom is not something trivial at all; it's about being free to live, to be yourself." In an interview with the newspaper Il manifesto, Sal Da Vinci described his song as follows: "Behind it, there is a message for the younger generations. Keeping promises is fundamental; it gives you balance. The song's story celebrates an eternal love, but the important thing is to plan one's future."

== Background ==
"Per sempre sì" was written and composed by Da Vinci himself with Alessandro La Cava, Eugenio Maimone, Federica Abbate and Da Vinci's son Francesco Da Vinci, arranged by Adriano Pennino, and produced by Merk & Kremont. As stated in an interview given to Rockol, the song came about through Da Vinci's collaboration with Filippo Gemignano, an A&R representative at Warner Records. When the track was introduced to Warner, the label had a positive reaction to it, which encouraged Da Vinci to submit the song to the artistic director and presenter of the Sanremo Music Festival 2026, Carlo Conti.

== Duet version ==
"Gia panta nai (Per sempre sì)"

Single by Sal Da Vinci and Antigoni
- Language: Italian; Greek
- Released: 9 July 2026
- Genre: Disco; funk; neomelodic
- Length: 2:56
- Label: Minos EMI; Warner
- Composers: Salvatore Michael Sorrentino; Alessandro La Cava; Federica Abbate; Federico Mercuri; Giordano Cremona; Eugenio Maimone; Antigoni Buxton; Vicky Gerothodorou
- Lyricists: Francesco Sorrentino; Alessandro La Cava; Federica Abbate
- Producers: ITACA; Adriano Pennino

Sal Da Vinci singles chronology
"Poesia" (2026)	"Gia panta nai (Per sempre sì)" (2026)

Antigoni Buxton singles chronology
"Oud" (2026)	"Gia panta nai (Per sempre sì)" (2026)

On 9 July 2026, a bilingual Italian-Greek duet version featuring English Cypriot singer Antigoni Buxton was released under the title "Gia panta nai (Per sempre sì)" (Greek: Για πάντα ναι).

== Music video ==
The music video for "Per sempre sì", directed by Giuseppe Marco Albano, was published alongside the release of the song through Da Vinci's YouTube channel and featured the participation of Italian dancers Francesca Tocca and Marcello Sacchetta.

== Charts ==
=== Weekly charts ===
Weekly chart performance
Chart (2026)	Peak position
Austria (Ö3 Austria Top 40)	18
Croatia International Airplay (Top lista)	11
Finland (Suomen virallinen lista)	27
Global Excl. US (Billboard)	115
Greece International (IFPI)	2
Italy (FIMI)	2
Italy Airplay (EarOne)	3
Lithuania (AGATA)	4
Malta Airplay (Radiomonitor)	16
Sweden (Sverigetopplistan)	89
Switzerland (Schweizer Hitparade)	21
UK Singles Sales (OCC)	45

=== Monthly charts ===
Monthly chart performance
Chart (2026)	Peak position
Lithuania Airplay (TopHit)	48

== Certifications ==
Certifications for "Per sempre sì"
Region	Certification	Certified units/sales
Italy (FIMI)	Platinum	200,000^{‡}
^{‡} Sales+streaming figures based on certification alone.
