= Mario Da Vinci =

Italian singer and actor (1942–2015)

- Born: Alfonso Sorrentino; 14 March 1942; Naples, Italy
- Died: 10 May 2015 (aged 73); Naples, Italy
- Occupations: Singer, actor
- Children: Sal Da Vinci

Alfonso Sorrentino (14 March 1942 – 10 May 2015), known by the stage name Mario Da Vinci, was an Italian canzone napoletana singer and actor.

Born in Naples, the son of a fisherman, during his career which he started in the 1960s Da Vinci recorded 13 albums and over sixty singles. Da Vinci participated four times at the Festival di Napoli, winning the 1981 edition with the song "'A mamma". His variegated career included television, theatre and films. His son Sal Da Vinci is also a successful Neapolitan singer.

== Discography ==
- Nostalgia di Napoli (1964)
- 'O bello per tutte le belle (1973)
- Miracolo 'e Natale (1976)
- Mario & Sal Da Vinci Vol. 1 (1977)
- Mario & Sal Da Vinci Vol. 2 (1977)
- 'O scugnizzo e 'o signore (1977)
- Figlio mio sono innocente (1978)
- Vasame ancora (1979)
- Napoli storia d'amore e di vendetta (1979)
- Muntevergine (Mamma Schiavona) (1980)
- 'O motorino (1981)
- Annabella (1982)
- Footing (1983)
