= Mark Harris (composer) =

- Born: Mark Baldwin Harris; August 8, 1955 (age 71); Meriden, Connecticut, United States
- Genres: Folk; pop
- Occupations: Musician, arranger, composer
- Instrument: Keyboards
- Years active: 1974–present
- Website: www.markharris.it

Mark Baldwin Harris (born August 8, 1955) is an American keyboardist, arranger, and composer based in Italy. He is known for his activity as multi-instrumentalist and record producer in the field of Italian popular music.

== Biography ==
Born in Connecticut (United States) from a family of non-professional musicians, he approaches music through the study of the classical piano. Later he will try his hand at various musical genres, from contemporary new music to rock and jazz, showing great eclecticism. In the summer of 1967 he moved with his family to Italy, where he worked in the field of pop music, continuing his experimental path at the same time. Since 1974 to 1975 he was part of Napoli Centrale.

Later his activity has brought him all over the world both in the concerts of the artists he supports and as an independent musician and has consequently also worked alongside important artists such as Al Jarreau, or with bel canto personalities such as Katia Ricciarelli, jazz musicians such as Enrico Rava, and with contemporary music composers such as Alvin Curran (in the ensemble "Musica Elettronica Viva").

He collaborated with, among others, Edoardo Bennato, Toni Esposito, Antonella Ruggiero, Laura Pausini, Sergio Caputo, Eros Ramazzotti, Giorgio Gaber, Skiantos, Mia Martini, Enzo Jannacci, Pino Daniele, Roberto Vecchioni, Alice, Eugenio Finardi and Renato Zero.
