= La Gatta Cenerentola =

Italian 1976 musical

La Gatta Cenerentola is a 1976 three-act musical, in Neapolitan language, adapted by Roberto De Simone from the sixth fable (Cinderella) of Giambattista Basile's Pentamerone. It debuted in Naples and later premiered in the United States (1985) and Great Britain (1988). De Simone sought to express the dreaminess of southern Italian popular culture. His fresh and authentic reinvention of folksongs brought him prominence. The initial production was favored by theater progressives and opposed by theater purists. Art music blogs rediscovered and praised the musical 30 years after its initial release.

== History ==
La Gatta Cenerentola is a Neapolitan Language, three-act musical adapted by Roberto De Simone from the sixth fable (Cinderella) of Giambattista Basile's Pentamerone. Its name translates as "The Cat Cinderella" or "Cinderella the Cat". It billed itself as a "musical fable" in three acts, told through villanelle, tarantella, and madrigal in a Neapolitan style. Its author sought to evoke the "dreamlike texture" of southern Italy's popular culture. De Simone, a composer and scholar, led a resurgence of the folk art tradition and public interest in 1940s folk singer-songwriters. He reinvented folksongs in a fresh yet authentic style in writing La Gatta Cenerentola, which, in turn, brought him prominence.

The musical debuted on July 9, 1976, at the Teatro Nuovo in Spoleto, Italy's Festival of Two Worlds, where it included actress Isa Danieli and the folk band Nuova Compagnia Di Canto Popolare. It received its American premiere on October 19, 1985, at the Vivian Beaumont Theater during Italy on Stage in New York City. The two-day run was performed by the visiting troupe Ente Teatro Cronaca of Naples—the oldest private theater company in southern Italy—directed by De Simone, and produced by the Italian Government with assistance from the America-Italy Society as part of the city's Italian Cultural Month. Its British premiere was at the King's Theatre in the Edinburgh International Festival from August 24–27, 1988.

== Reception and influence ==
The original production had mixed reception. It was favored by opera progressives and opposed by opera purists.

Thirty years after the musical's debut, 20 Jazz Funk Greats wrote that its "Secondo Coro delle Lavandaie" (Second Chorus of the Washerwomen) had specifically influenced contemporary pieces by both OOIOO (especially Taiga) and 3rd Face's "Canto della Liberta". Travess Smalley of Rhizome.org called it the best song he found online in 2009.
