= Mísia =

Portuguese fado singer (1955–2024)

Susana Maria Alfonso de Aguiar (18 June 1955 – 27 July 2024), known mononymously as Mísia, was a Portuguese fado singer. She was a polyglot, singing some of her songs in Spanish, French, Catalan, English, and Japanese.

== Background ==
Mísia's mother was Catalan and used to be a cabaret dancer, which accounts for many of the influences that shaped her music: tango, bolero, the use of Portuguese guitar with accordion, violin and the piano.

Mísia died from cancer at a hospital in Lisbon, on 27 July 2024, at the age of 69.

== Style ==
Throughout her career, Mísia developed a new style: she modernized Amália Rodrigues's fado, shocking orthodox audiences by adding to the traditional instruments (bass guitar, classical guitar and Portuguese guitar) the sensuality of the accordion and the violin, while also borrowing their finest verses from the greatest Portuguese poets.

== Recordings ==
She recorded a little-known record in Catalan.

Her first solo album was released in 1990, at a time when fado was a poor career choice for a Portuguese singer. With the exception of Amália Rodrigues and Carlos do Carmo, there was no audience for "fadistas". Nevertheless, Mísia went on to record an album respecting all the traditional features of the genre, including poems from popular fado songwriters, such as Joaquim Frederico de Brito or José Niza, alongside poems by famous Portuguese poets, such as José Carlos Ary dos Santos, and even a piece from Vinicius de Moraes's song, "Samba em Prelúdio".

The album bore her name, "Mísia", and was very well received by both audience and critics outside Portugal, mainly in France. The album was followed by "Fado" in 1993, in which she maintained her decision to use lyrics by popular writers and poets. This time she sang songs by Sérgio Godinho ("Liberdades Poeticas"), Amália Rodrigues ("Lágrima"), along with poems from António Lobo Antunes ("Nasci Para Morrer Contigo"), Rosa Lobato de Faria ("Fado Quimera" and "Velhos Amantes" based on a song by Jacques Brel) and even a text by future Nobel Prize winner José Saramago ("Fado Adivinha").

In 1995, she recorded "Tanto Menos Tanto Mais" (Means "Less Is More"), which combines the texture of classical fado instruments, the Portuguese guitar, the acoustic guitar and the bass, with that of the violin, the accordion, the piano and even the harp. Once more, she sang António Lobo Antunes, but also Fernando Pessoa and João Monge, one of the most appreciated Portuguese lyrics-writers.

The first album to be released in the USA was "Garras dos Sentidos" ("Claws of the Senses") in 1998. The concept of this album was to use lyrics by famous Portuguese poets with melodies belonging to Traditional Fado (where the melody is not bound to specific lyrics). This way, Mísia not only sang text by past poets like Fernando Pessoa, Mário de Sá Carneiro, Natália Correia or António Botto but also contemporary poets like José Saramago and Mário Cláudio, and she also invited two writers to write poems for the album, Agustina Bessa-Luís, who wrote the lyrics for the titletrack, and Lídia Jorge, whose main poem, Fado Do Retorno is sung in two versions: track 4 with piano, accordion, violin and double bass, and track 11 with Portuguese guitar, acoustic guitar, bassa, double bass, violin and accordion.

Her 1999 album, "Paixões Diagonais" ("Diagonal Passions") again used songs from a variety of writers, from João Monge, Amélia Muge, Antonio dos Santos or Vitorino Salomé, to Rosa Lobato de Faria or Sérgio Godinho.

In 2001, she decided to pay a tribute to Amália Rodrigues, after the latter's death, and recorded "Ritual", where all the songs (except the last one) were recorded as traditional three-instrument fados.

Her 2003 album, Canto, may be considered as her masterpiece. Mixing pieces of the best works of the Portuguese guitarist Carlos Paredes with poems by Vasco Graça Moura (and lyrics by Sérgio Godinho and Pedro Tamen), Mísia created a musical work she would describe as belonging to her "gallery of impossible things".

In her 2005 album Drama Box, Mísia depicts herself as a cabaret dancer living in the "Drama Box Hotel" with her musicians.

In her 2009 album, Ruas (streets) Mísia goes beyond the boundaries of the fado. The first part of the double album, "Lisboarium" is an imaginary journey through Lisbon, expressed in fado. The second part, "Tourists", however, contains performances by Mísia of very different kinds of music. It includes music in Turkish, Spanish, English and French. The concept is non-fado music that according to Mísia has the "fado soul". An example of this is her version of "Hurt", originally by Nine Inch Nails but inspired by the version by Johnny Cash. Fanny Ardant, Ute Lemper, Carmen Maura, Miranda Richardson and Maria de Medeiros participate in the record.

Senhora da noite was released in 2011. The lyrics are all written by women – 13 Fados, 13 women. Writers, poets, authors, Fado singers, singers. Agustina Bessa Luís, Florbela Espanca, Manuela de Freitas, Hélia Correia, Amélia Muge, Lídia Jorge and many more. John Turturro directs the video-clip of "O Manto da Rainha" (2011), a text by Mísia herself.

2013 was the year of Delikatessen Café Concerto with musical direction by the conductor Fabrízio Romano from Naples, and the participation of Ramón Vargas, Adriana Calcanhotto, Paulo Furtado (The Legendary Tigerman), Melech Mechaya, Iggy Pop and Dead Combo.

Para Amália is dedicated to Amalia. The greatest hits album Do Primeiro Fado Ao Último Tango was released in 2016 by Warner.

Pura Vida (Banda Sonora), released in April 2019, is the soundtrack of two difficult years where there was "hell, hardness and passion".

Animal Sentimental (2022) was her last album.

== Discography ==
- 1991 – Mísia (EMI)
- 1993 – Fado (BMG)
- 1995 – Tanto menos, tanto mais (BMG)
- 1998 – Garras dos Sentidos (Detour)
- 1999 – Paixões Diagonais (Detour)
- 2001 – Ritual (Erato)
- 2003 – Canto (music by Carlos Paredes) (Warner)
- 2005 – Drama Box (Naive)
- 2009 – Ruas (AZ)
- 2011 – Senhora da noite (Sìlene)
- 2013 – Delikatessen Café Concerto (Parlophone)
- 2015 – Para Amália (Warner)
- 2016 - Do Primeiro Fado Ao Último Tango (Warner)
- 2019 - Pura Vida (Banda Sonora) (Gaileo Music)
- 2022 - Animal Sentimental (Galileo Music)
