= Pino De Vittorio =

Italian singer and actor

Pino De Vittorio Giuseppe De Vittorio
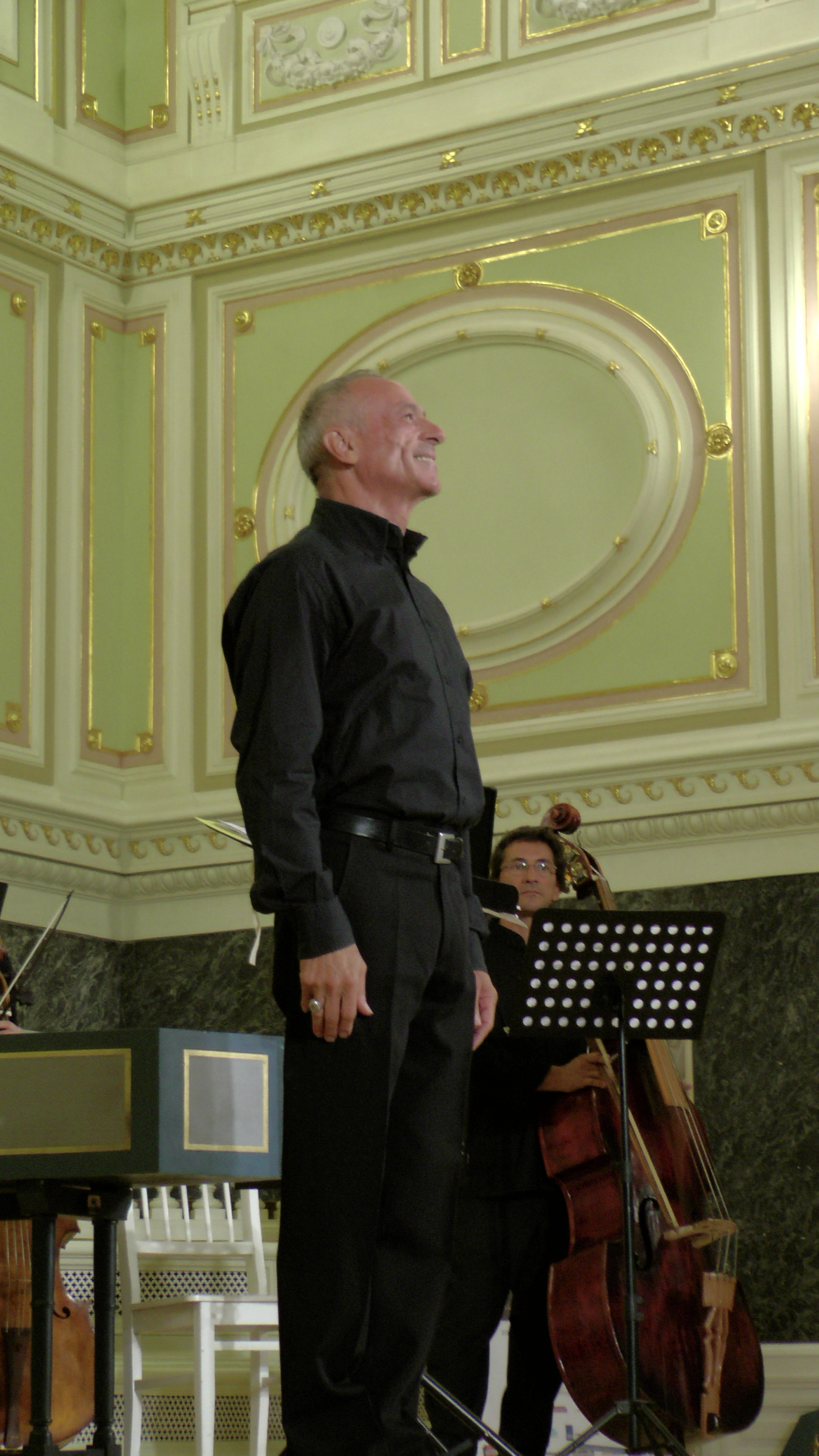

Background information
- Born: 1954 (age 70–71); Leporano, Taranto, Italy

Giuseppe De Vittorio, commonly known as Pino De Vittorio (born 24 December 1954) is an Italian tenor and actor. He has also sung as a sopranist.

De Vittorio was born in Leporano, Taranto, in 1954. In 1976 with Angelo Savelli he founded La Compagnia Pupi e Fresedde which performed Apulian folk music and tarantellas. In the 1980s, De Vittorio joined Roberto De Simone's theater company, taking part, often among the leading roles, in some of his most important works: Mistero Napolitano, Li Zite 'Ngalera, Opera Buffa del Giovedì Santo, la Gatta Cenerentola, Stabat Mater with Irene Papas, Requiem in memoria di Pasolini, 99 disgrazie di Pulcinella, il Drago. At the Opéra Garnier he sings as Nutrice in Robert Wilson's L'incoronazione di Poppea.

In a career spanning more than 40 years, he toured extensively in Italy and abroad.

One of his important collaborations was with Rinaldo Alessandrini and Antonio Florio, together they interpreted historic Neapolitan cantatas, an almost forgotten genre at the time.

One of his important collaborations was with Rinaldo Alessandrini and Antonio Florio, together they interpreted historic Neapolitan cantatas, an almost forgotten genre at the time. With Florio he co-founded Cappella della Pietà de' Turchini, a baroque music ensemble. They have been pioneers as an orchestra of rediscovered and revisited historical music, in more than 30 years of activity they have released more than 40 albums and performed at festivals around the world. With De Simone, De Vittorio co-founded Media Aetas group.

== Awards ==
- 2012: Saturo d'Argento award
- 2012: Mousiké Regione Puglia award

== Discography ==
- Tarantelle del Gargano L'Empreinte Digitale 1997
- Tarantelle del Rimorso Eloquentia 2006
- Cantate Napoletane del '700 La Cappella della Pietà de' Turchini directed Antonio Florio. Eloquentia 2009
- Siciliano Glossa Records 2013
