= Chitarra battente =

Italian stringed instrument

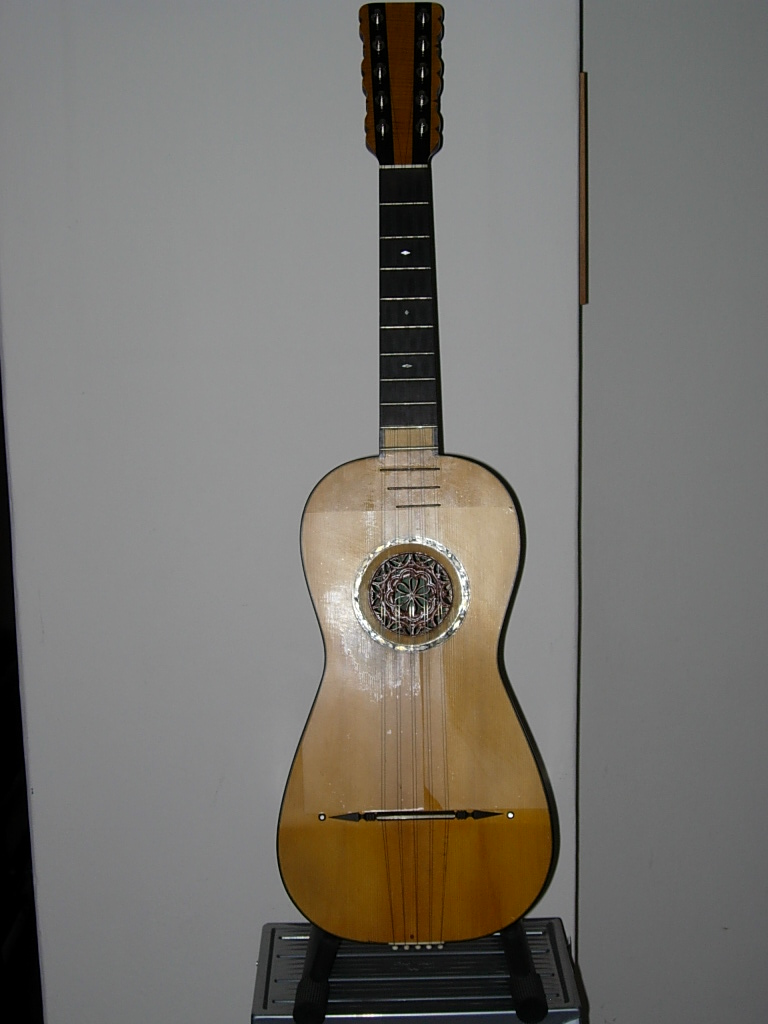
- Chitarra battente

String instrument
- Classification: String instrument
- Hornbostel–Sachs classification: 321.322 (Composite chordophone)

Related instruments
- Baroque guitar

The chitarra battente (in Italian "strumming guitar", however "battente" literally means "beating" related to the fact that this guitar thumps the rhythm of the music) is a musical instrument, a chordophone of the guitar family. It is similar to the 5-course baroque guitar, but larger and typically strung with five double strings, traditionally made of brass, but currently - steel.

Nowadays it is typically used by folk musicians, mainly in the southern Italian regions of Calabria, Apulia, Basilicata, and Campania, as well as in other areas of southern Italy; in past centuries the instrument was found in most of central and southern Italy.

== History ==
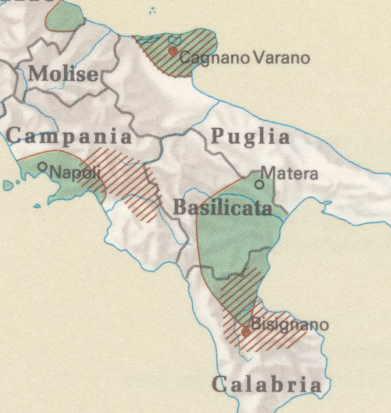
Traditional diffusion of the chitarra battente in the Southern Italy (red pattern).

It is considered a folk instrument, though it has its origins in the Italian court music in the early Baroque era. Musicologists refer to the "historical" as well as the "folk" chitarra battente. There are many extant historical 17th century instruments in museums. Though now associated with Southern Italy, the chitarra battente has been built and played as far north as Ponte Caffaro in Lombardy until the turn of the 20th century.

== Construction ==
The chitarra battente comes in three sizes. The medium and large instruments are the most common. The instrument may have five or four courses of strings. These courses are typically double or triple, a“course” being a group of 2 or 3 strings plucked as a single unit. Thus chitarra battente is typically a five or four-course instrument.

There is great variation in the size of the bouts (the rounded “hourglass” curves of the body of the instrument), kinds of wood, shape of the back, decorations, number of frets, etc. The strings are tuned in what is called a “re-entrant” system; that is, unlike a modern classical guitar, the lower strings may be tuned to higher pitches.

== Playing ==
The instrument is played without a plectrum, and the fingers achieve a wide range of effects through plucking, strumming, beating the strings or the sound board, etc.

The chitarra battente is typically used to accompany singing or dancing and can be played in an ensemble or as a solo instrument.

The most important center of production is in Bisignano in the province of Cosenza. Traditionally the instrument has been made locally in the region from which its characteristics derive, often being constructed by non-professional craftsmen or simple carpenters.

== Tuning ==
Tuning of the chitarra battente

From the first to the fifth courses of strings, the tuning is usually: E (Mi), B (Si), G (Sol), D (Re), A (La), like one of the three tunings of the baroque guitar & it's also the same as the 1st 5 strings of a Modern Guitar ( the bottom 2 an Octave Up from Normal) which makes it easy to play the same Chord shapes.

== Players ==
Notable virtuosos on chitarra battente are Marcello Vitale, Francesco Loccisano, Marcello De Carolis and Alessandro Santacaterina.

== Sources ==
Tucci, Roberta and Antonello Ricci. (1985). "The Chitarra Battente in Calabria". The Galpin Society Journal (vol. 38, Apr. 1985): 78-105.
