= Pietra Montecorvino =

Italian singer and actress

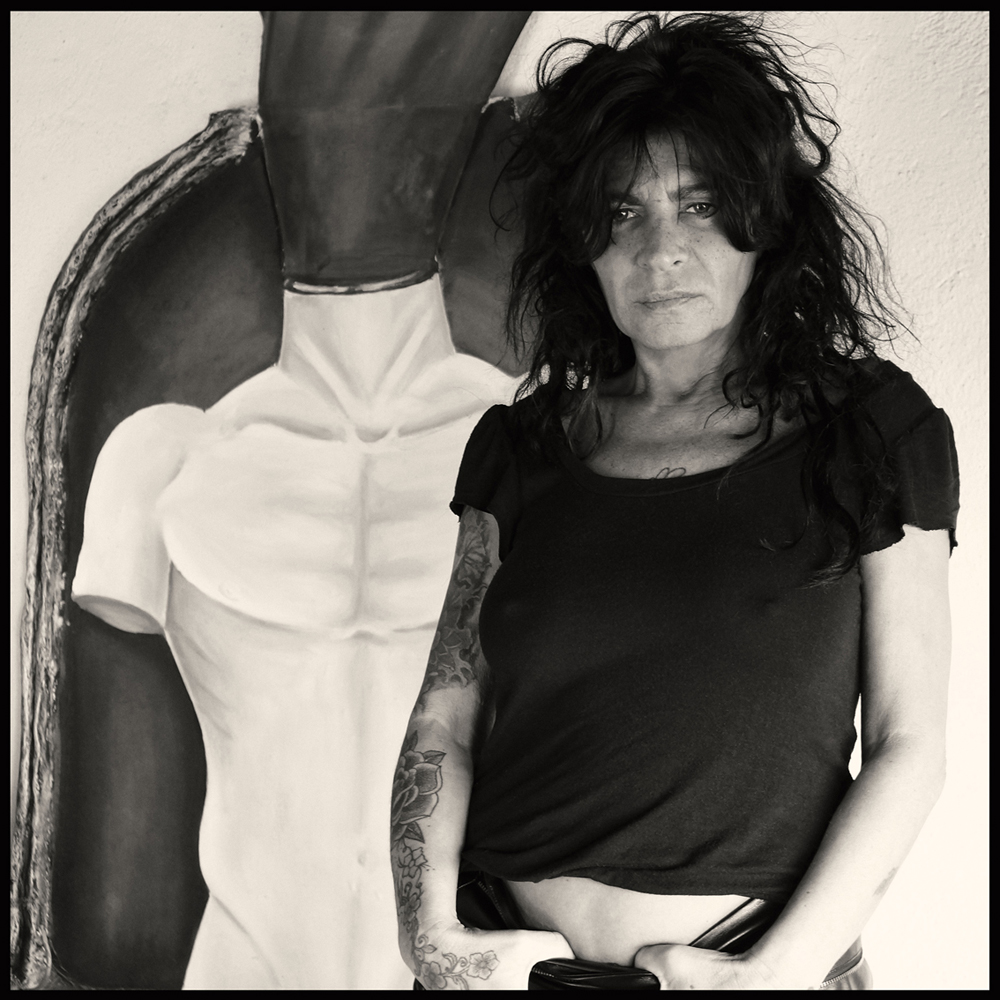
Pietra Montecorvino photographed by Augusto De Luca

Pietra Montecorvino (born 2 December 1962 in Naples) is an Italian singer and actress. Her real name is Barbara D'Alessandro and her pseudonym is a play on the name of the small town of Pietramontecorvino near Foggia in south-east Italy. She and her longterm companion Eugenio Bennato have two children, Carola and Fulvio.

== Film career ==
Montecorvino made her acting debut in the film "FF.SS." in 1983. With fellow actor Renzo Abore she released a single called "Sud" from the film the same year. She later went on to star in movies like La Ciorta de Feliciello and Cavalli Si Nasce.

== Singing career ==
Montecorvino has become well known for her rasping voice and emotional delivery.

Her first solo single was "Una città che vola/Tutta pe' mme", in 1988. In the same year she performed three duets with Italian singer/songwriter Angelo Branduardi, "Fruit", "Tango" and "Bluebeard", on his album Bread and Roses. She did not release her first solo album, Segnorita, until 1991, when she was nearly 30, but there have been several other albums since.

Montecorvino appeared on the British TV music programme Later... with Jools Holland on 21 April 2004.

On 30 August 2009, Montecorvino took part in a concert to celebrate the inaugural Italian-Libyan Friendship Day before Libyan head of state Muammar Gaddafi and Italian Prime Minister Silvio Berlusconi. Afterwards, she gave an interview in which she explained her view of the two leaders.

== Filmography ==
- "FF.SS." – Cioè: "...che mi hai portato a fare sopra a Posillipo se non mi vuoi più bene?", directed by Renzo Arbore (1983)
- Cavalli si nasce, directed by Sergio Staino (1989)
- Due Madri per Rocco (TV movie) (1994)
- Parola di mago, directed by Bruno Colella (1995)
- Fondali Notturni, directed by Nino Russo (2000)
- Aitanic, Directed by Nino D'Angelo (2000)
- Totò Sapore e la magica storia della pizza, voicing the character Vesuvia (2003)
- Passione, directed by John Turturro (2010)

== Discography ==
- 1991: Segnorita (Five Record, FM 13691)
- 1992: Favola blues (RTI – 1002-1)
- 1993: Voce di Pietra (RTI – 1034-2)
- 2000: La stella del cammino (Mr Music – MRCD4206)
- 2003: Napoli Mediterranea (L'Empreinte Digitale – ED13172)
- 2009: Italiana (Malamusik – 8 031274 007480)
- 2014: Esagerata (CNI Music – CNDL 27921)
- 2015: Pietra a metà – This is an album of songs by Pino Daniele who died in January 2015.
