= James Senese =

Italian jazz musician (1945–2025)

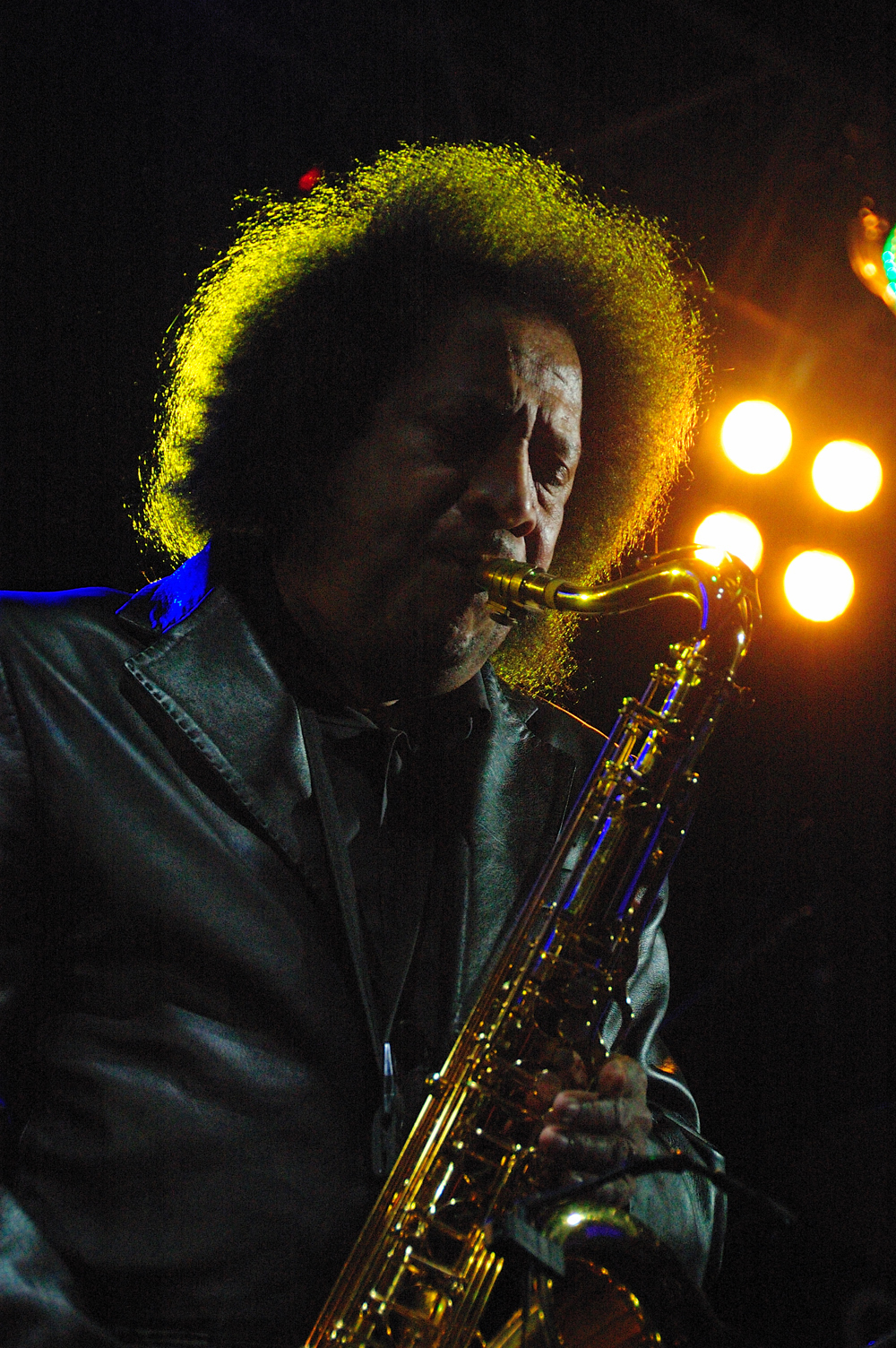
- Senese in 2010

Background information
- Born: Gaetano Senese; 6 January 1945; Naples, Italy
- Died: 29 October 2025 (aged 80) Naples, Italy
- Genres: Jazz
- Occupation: Musician
- Instrument: Saxophone

Gaetano "James" Senese (6 January 1945 – 29 October 2025) was an Italian saxophonist, composer and singer-songwriter.

== Life and career ==
Senese was born in Naples, the son of Anna Senese and James Smith, an American soldier from North Carolina in Italy because of World War II. Senese's father moved back to the US eighteen months after Gaetano's birth and never returned. Senese started playing the saxophone at 12 years old. He made his professional debut in the 1960s, as a member of the rhythm and blues band The Showmen (later known as Showmen 2), with whom he won the 1968 edition of Cantagiro.

In 1974 Senese co-founded and led the jazz-progressive rock group Napoli Centrale. After the group disbanded in 1978, he started a long collaboration with Pino Daniele, both in studio and on stage. During his career, he also collaborated with James Brown, Ornette Coleman, Gil Evans, Art Ensemble of Chicago and Roberto De Simone. His first solo album was released in 1983 by Polydor Records.

A documentary film about Senese, James, was directed in 2020 by Andrea Della Monica and premiered at the 77th edition of the Venice Film Festival.

Senese died of pneumonia at Cardarelli Hospital in Naples, on 29 October 2025, at the age of 80. He had been hospitalised since 24 September.

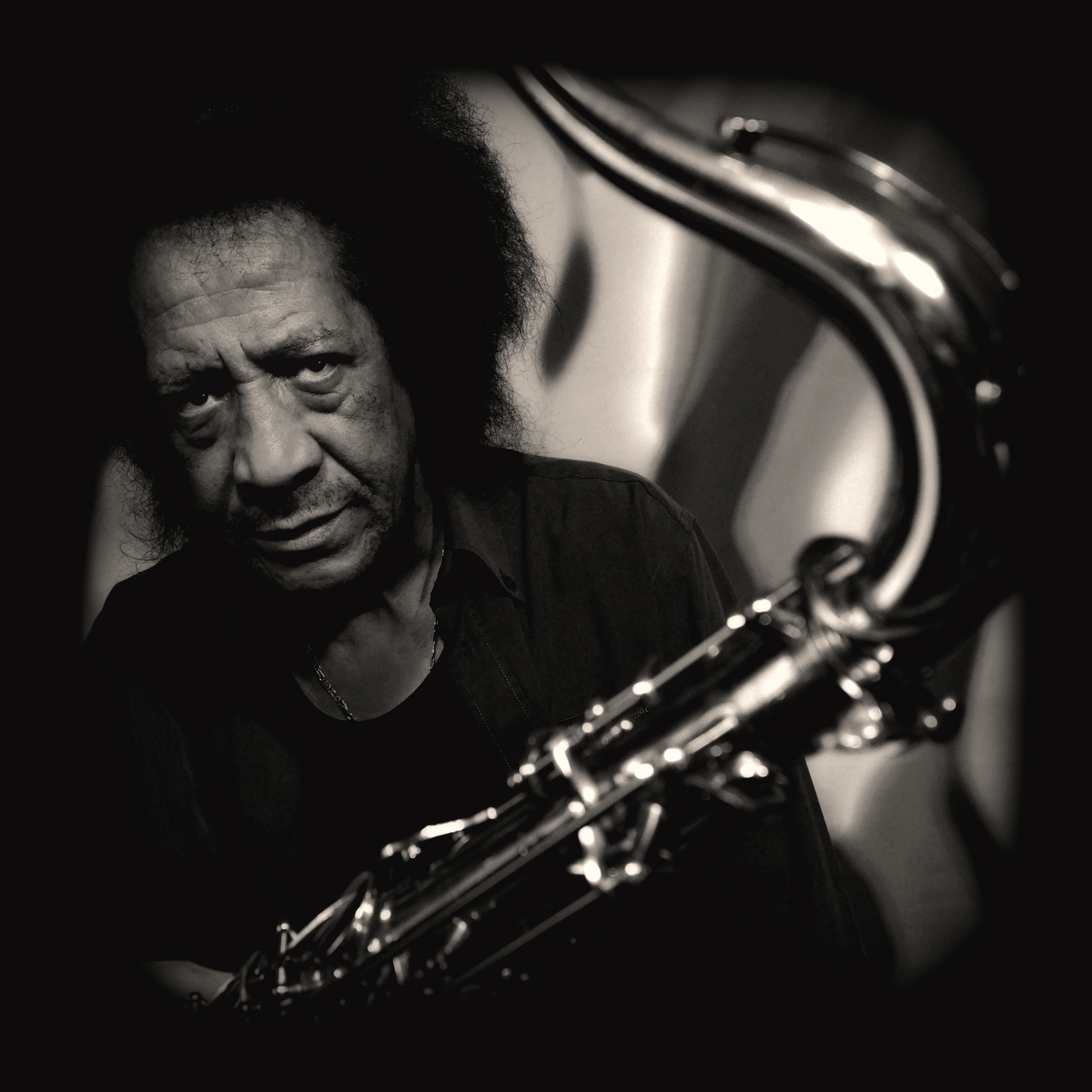
Jamese Senese in 2017, photographed by Augusto De Luca

== Discography ==
- James Senese (Polydor, 1983)
- Il passo del gigante (Tobacco, 1984)
- Alhambra (EMI Italiana, 1988)
- Hey James (Blue Angel, 1991)
- Sabato Santo (Polosud, 2000)
- Passpartù (ITWHY, 2003)
- Tribù e passione (with Enzo Gragnaniello) (Edel Italia, 2003)
- E' Fernut' 'o Tiempo (Arealive, 2012)
- O sanghe (Alabianca/Warner, 2016)
- Chest nun é a terra mia - (Arealive, 2025)
