= Enzo Gragnaniello =

Italian singer-songwriter and composer (born 1954)

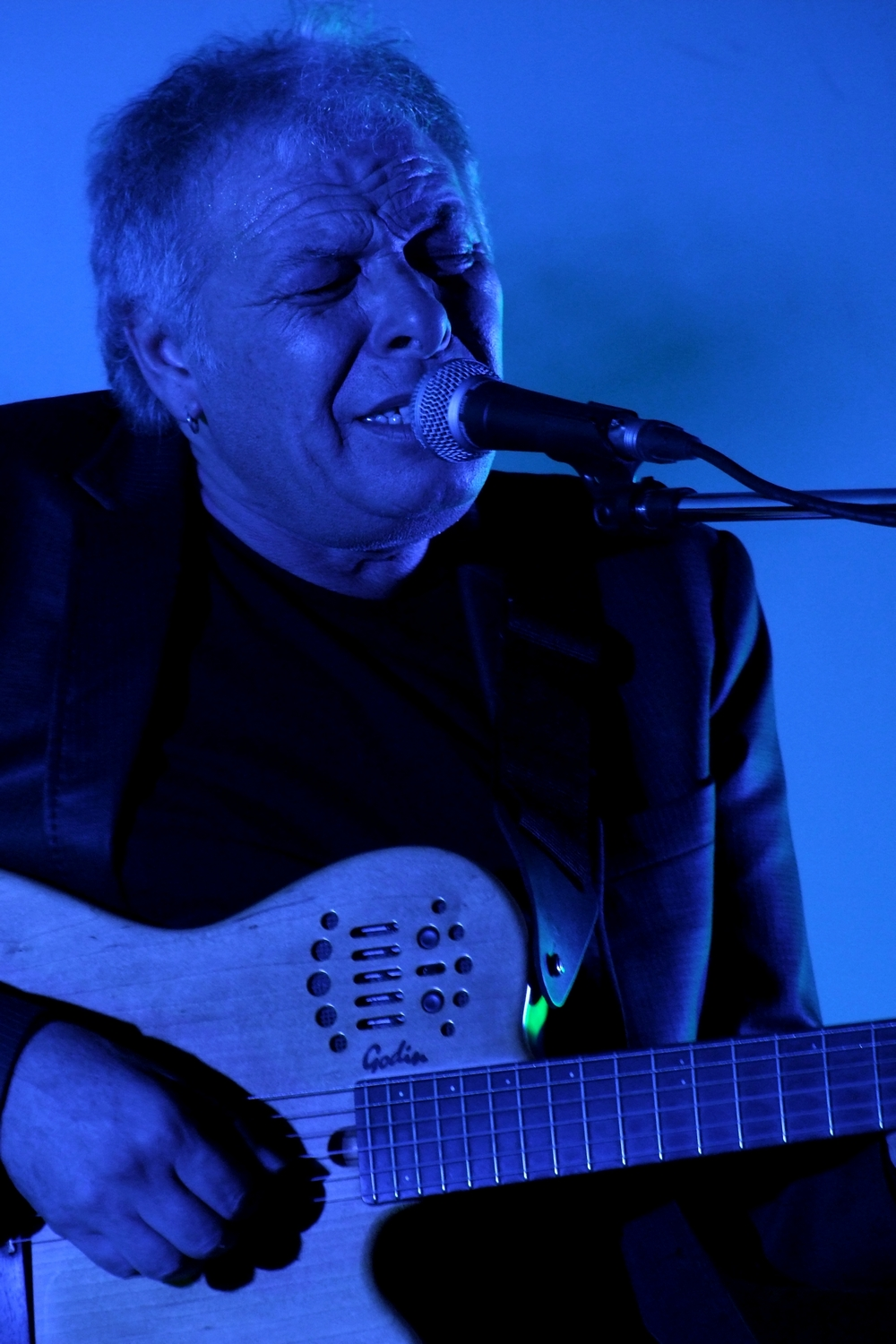
- Born: 20 October 1954 (age 71); Naples, Italy
- Occupation: singer-songwriter

Enzo Gragnaniello (born 20 October 1954) is an Italian singer-songwriter and composer.

== Life and career ==
Born in Quartieri Spagnoli, Naples, Gragnaniello began playing the guitar at the age of 12 and began composing his first songs at 18 years old. In 1977 he formed the group "Banchi nuovi", named after the Committee of unemployed people to which he belonged.

Gragnaniello made his solo debut in 1983, with the eponymous album Enzo Gragnaniello. In 1986 he received his first Targa Tenco, an award he won again in 1990, 1999 and 2020. In 1991 his song "Cu'mmè", recorded by Roberto Murolo and Mia Martini, obtained a great commercial success and became instant classics in Italy; in 1997 with the same song Gragnaniello won the music festival "Viva Napoli". In 1999 he entered the competition at the Sanremo Music Festival in a duet with Ornella Vanoni, ranking fourth with the song "Alberi".

As a vocalist his husky voice has been compared to Tom Waits. Gragnaniello composed songs for Andrea Bocelli, Adriano Celentano, Gerardina Trovato among others. He is also active as a composer of musical scores for stage plays and films.

== Discography ==
=== Album ===
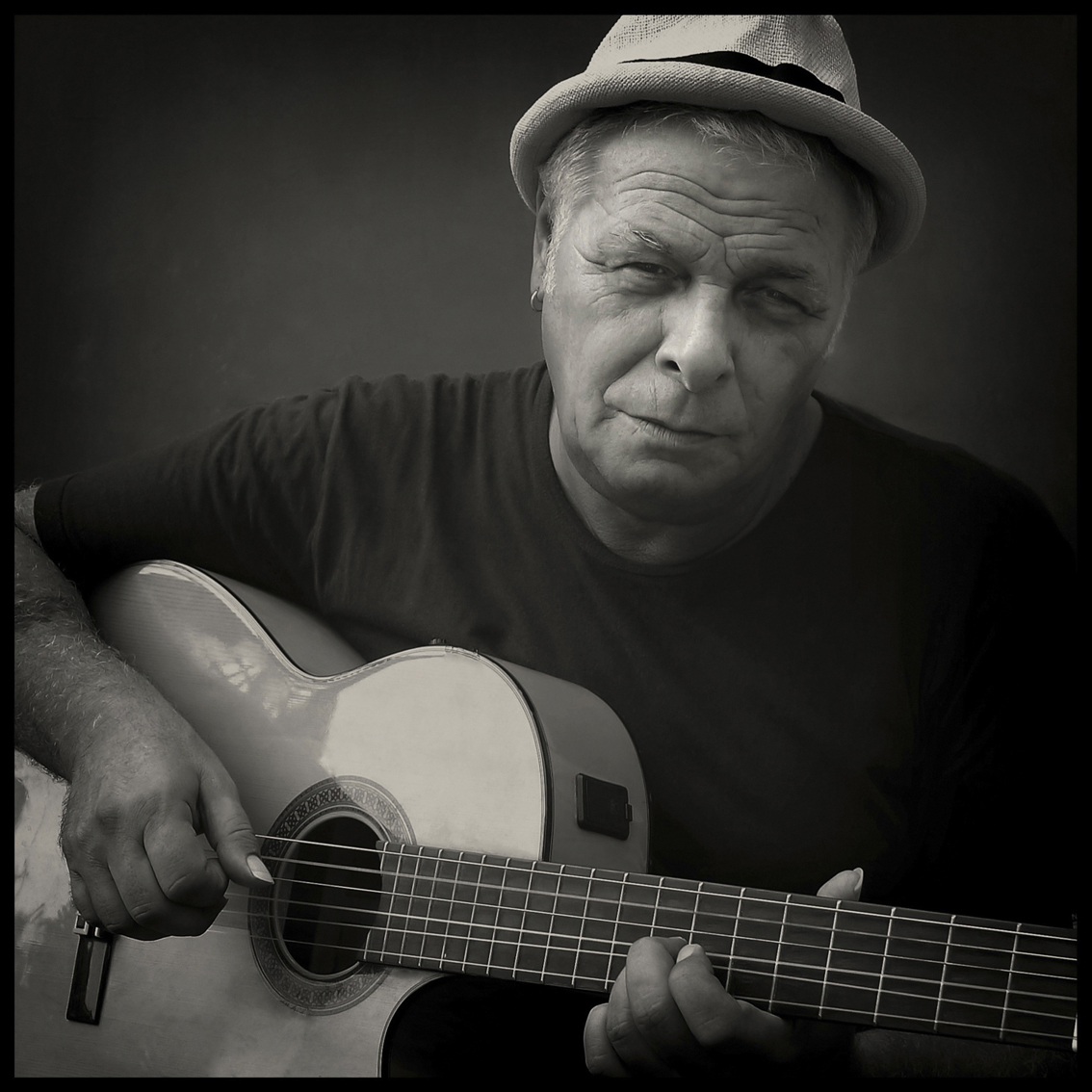
Enzo Gragnaniello in 2014, photographed by Augusto De Luca

- 1983 - Enzo Gragnaniello
- 1985 - Salita Trinità degli Spagnoli
- 1990 - Fujente
- 1991 - Veleno mare e ammore
- 1993 - Un mondo che non c'è
- 1994 - Cercando il sole
- 1996 - Posteggiatore abusivo
- 1996 - Continuerò
- 1998 - Neapolis mantra
- 1998 - Canzoni di rabbia canzoni d'amore
- 1999 - Oltre gli alberi
- 1999 - Dai Quartieri al S.Carlo
- 2001 - Balìa
- 2003 - Tribù e passione (with James Senese)
- 2003 - The Best of Enzo Gragnaniello
- 2005 - Quanto mi costa
- 2007 - L'Erba Cattiva
- 2011 - Radice
- 2013 - Live
- 2015 - Misteriosamente
- 2019 - Lo chiamavano vient' 'e terra
- 2021 - Rint’ ‘o posto sbagliato
