= Cristina Branco =

Portuguese musician (Born 1972)

- Born: 28 December 1972 (age 53)
- Origin: Almeirim
- Genres: Fado, World music, Jazz
- Years active: 1997–present
- Label: Locomotiva Azul
- Website: Official website

Cristina Branco (born 28 December 1972 in Almeirim, Ribatejo, Portugal) is a Portuguese musician. She was drawn to jazz and styles of Portuguese music before settling on fado, a choice made after being introduced to the music of Amália Rodrigues by her grandfather. Branco then studied the poems from which the major fado lyrics are taken. Branco performs accompanied by composer Custódio Castelo on guitar.

== Discography ==
Her discography includes:

Year	Title
2025	Mulheres de Abril
2025	Fado em Movimento (with Ensemble Des Équilibres and Bernardo Couto)
2023	Mãe
2022	Amoras numa Tarde de Outono (with João Paulo Esteves da Silva)
2020	Eva
2018	Branco
2016	Menina
2014	Idealist
2013	Alegria
2011	Fado/Tango
2009	Kronos
2007	Abril
2005	Ulisses
2003	Sensus
2002	O Descobridor
2001	Corpo Iluminado
2000	Post-Scriptum
1998	Murmúrios
1997	Cristina Branco in Holland
