= Eugenio Bennato =

Italian folk musician and songwriter

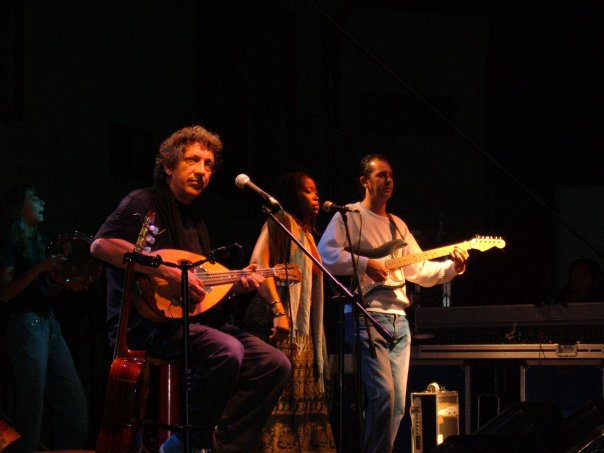
- Eugenio Bennato (left) performing live at Atripalda

Background information
- Born: Eugenio Bennato; 16 March 1948 (age 78); Naples, Italy
- Genres: Folk; world
- Occupations: Singer; guitarist; songwriter
- Instruments: Vocals; guitar
- Years active: 1969–present
- Labels: Emi Records; Philips Records; Bubble Records; Taranta Power/Cramps Music

Eugenio Bennato (born 16 March 1948) is an Italian folk musician and songwriter. He is the brother of the musician Edoardo Bennato.

== Biography ==
In 1969, he cofounded the folk band Nuova Compagnia di Canto Popolare, discovered by the author Eduardo De Filippo, who admitted them in his theater. After four studio records, he left and cofounded Musicanova in 1976.

The band wrote the film soundtrack of L'eredità della priora, television film directed by Anton Giulio Majano. In the early 80's he started a solo career.

In 1989, he won a Nastro d'Argento for Best Score, with the movie Cavalli si nasce, directed by Sergio Staino.

In 1990, he participated at the Sanremo Music Festival with Tony Esposito, playing a song called Novecento aufwiedersehen.

In 1998, he founded a musical movement called Taranta Power, with the aim of promoting south-Italian folk culture through music, cinema and theater.

In 2003, he wrote, along with his brother Edoardo, the soundtrack of the animated cartoon Totò Sapore e la magica storia della pizza.

In 2006, he taught laboratory of ethnomusicology at the Suor Orsola Benincasa University of Naples.

In 2008, he returned at the Sanremo Festival with the song Grande Sud.

He is a supporter of esperanto language.

== Discography ==
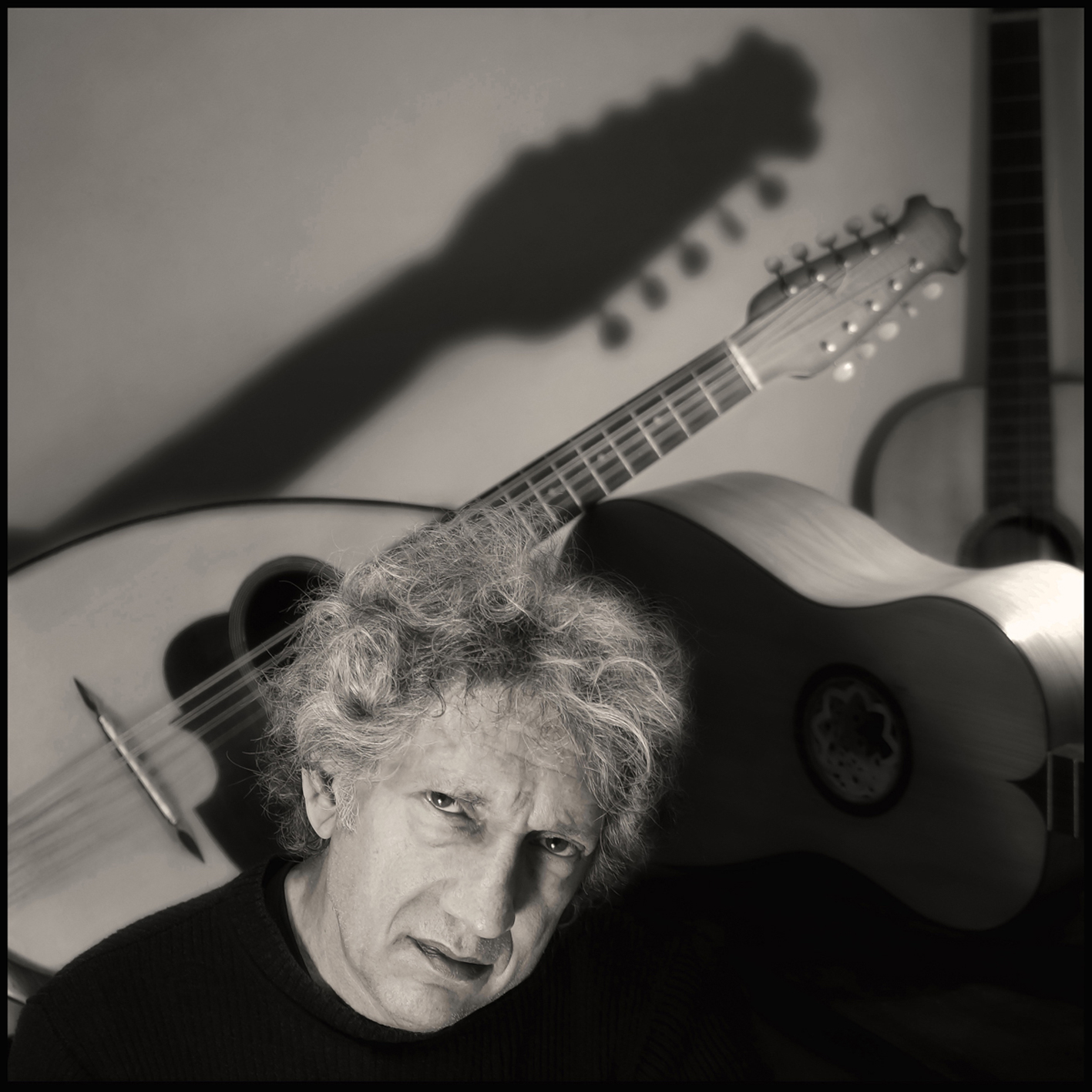
Eugenio Bennato photographed by Augusto De Luca

=== Nuovo Canto Popolare ===
- Nuova Compagnia di Canto Popolare (1971)
- NCCP (1973)
- Li Sarracini adorano lu sole (1974)
- Tarantella ca nun va 'bbona (1975)

=== Musicanova ===
- Garofano d'ammore (1977)
- Musicanova (1978)
- Quando turnammo a nascere (1979)
- Brigante se more (1980)
- Festa festa (1981)

=== Solo ===
- Eugenio Bennato (1983)
- Dulcinea (1984)
- Eughenes (1986)
- La stanza dello scirocco (1988)
- Le città di mare (1989)
- Novecento auf Wiedersehen (1991)
- Mille e una notte fa (1997)
- Taranta power (1999)
- Lezioni di tarantella (2000)
- Che il Mediterraneo sia (2001)
- Sponda Sud (2007)
- Grande Sud (2008)
- Questione meridionale (2011)
