= Roberto De Simone =

Italian composer and musicologist (1933–2025)

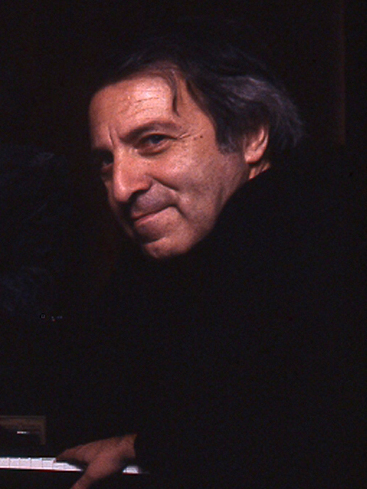
- Roberto De Simone in 1989, photographed by Augusto De Luca
- Born: 25 August 1933; Naples, Italy
- Died: 6 April 2025 (aged 91); Naples, Italy
- Occupations: Composer; pianist; playwright; stage director; conservatory director; ethnomusicologist
- Organizations: Teatro di San Carlo; Conservatorio San Pietro a Majella

Roberto De Simone (Italian: [roˈbɛrto de siˈmoːne]; 25 August 1933 – 6 April 2025) was an Italian stage director, academic teacher, playwright, composer and ethnomusicologist. Beginning as a harpsichordist, he turned to research of early Italian music and co-founded the Nuova Compagnia di Canto Popolare to perform it. The musical La Gatta Cenerentola, which he authored, composed and directed, was first performed at the Festival dei Due Mondi in Spoleto in 1976 and received international recognition. He directed the San Carlo Theatre from 1981 to 1987, and was stage director of operas at La Scala in Milan from 1986. He was director of the Conservatorio San Pietro a Majella from 1995 to 2000.

== Life and career ==
Born in Naples on 25 August 1933, De Simone graduated in piano and composition from the San Pietro a Maiella Conservatory. He started an intense concert activity, performing as an harpsichordist in the Domenico Scarlatti Orchestra. At the same time he started being active as an ethnomusical researcher and essayist, mainly focused on the southern Italy folk music of oral tradition, with specific interest in tarantism and funeral laments. In the second half of the 1960s he met some musicians who shared with him an interest in traditional music, and this encounter led to the foundation of the Nuova Compagnia di Canto Popolare, with whom De Simone collaborated for a decade. He approached the Piccola Scala in 1972 as a possible venue for the troupe. He taught music history at the Conservatorio San Pietro a Majella in Naples from 1972 to 1976.

In 1976, he made his debut as a playwright (also serving as librettist, composer, and director) with the musical La Gatta Cenerentola, which was first staged at the Festival dei Due Mondi in Spoleto and later enjoyed national and international success. It was performed at the Vivian Beaumont Theater in New York City in 1985 and at the King's Theatre as part of the 1988 Edinburgh International Festival. His other notable stage works include Mistero napoletano (1977), L'Opera buffa del Giovedì Santo based on Pergolesi's Stabat Mater (1980), Messa di requiem in memory of Pier Paolo Pasolini, as a choral-symphonic work (1985), Carmina Vivianea for soloist, choir and orchestra setting texts by Raffaele Viviani (1986), Stabat Mater for speaker, eight soloists and orchestra (1986), and Mistero e processo di Giovanna d'Arco for choir and orchestra (1989). He also composed several film scores.

De Simone was artistic director of the San Carlo Theatre in Naples from 1981 to 1987 where he revived 18th-century operas from Naples. Invited by Riccardo Muti, De Simone directed Verdi's Nabucco to open the 1986/87 season at La Scala in Milan, with Renato Bruson and Ghena Dimitrova in the leading roles. The production was revived in 1988 and 1996. In 1989, he directed Gluck's Orfeo ed Euridice with Bernadette Manca di Nissa as Orfeo, and also Pergolesi's Lo frate 'nnamorato. In 1990, he was scenic director for Mozart's Idomeneo with Giuseppe Sabbatini in the title role, again for the opening of the season. He collaborated with Muti again for the opening of the 1995/96 season with Mozart's Die Zauberflöte, broadcast and produced also for LaScalaTv.

De Simone was director of the Naples Conservatory from 1995 to 2000. He became a member of the Accademia di Santa Cecilia in 1998. He received the Roberto Sanseverino Prize in 2003, the Nonino Risit d'Aur Prize in 2015, and the title of cavaliere of the Order of Merit of the Italian Republic in 2019.

De Simone died at his home in Naples, on 6 April 2025, at the age of 91.
