= List of contestants from the UK national selection for the Eurovision Song Contest =

Eurovision: You Decide was the most recent name of the BBC TV show broadcast to select the United Kingdom's entry into the Eurovision Song Contest.

Shows of similar formats have previously gone under several other names, including Festival of British Popular Songs, Eurovision Song Contest British Final, A Song For Europe, The Great British Song Contest, Eurovision: Making Your Mind Up and Eurovision: Your Decision. In 2011 the selection process was replaced by an internal BBC decision, but this process ended after 2015 with a revival of a national final for 2016 under a new name. The You Decide format was axed in September 2019 and an internal selection was used for the UK's 2020 participation.

This page lists the contestants for each year of the show; the winners of the contest are in bold-italics.

== Competition ==
In 1957, 1959 and 1960, there were a series of televised heats prior to the final.

Postcard voting was used to choose the winner from 1965 to 1975. This had to be abandoned in 1971 due to a postal strike, with regional juries, made up of ordinary members of the public selecting the winner. Juries did the job from 1957 to 1964 and from 1976 to 1987. From 1988 onwards, with the exception of the internally selected entries (2011–15 and since 2020), televoting has been organized ostensibly to choose the winner, although this result wasn't always followed. Panels of judges have also played a part in selecting finalists and the winners in various years since 2008.

=== Festival of British Popular Songs (1957) ===
1957
Tuesday, 12 February. The King's Theatre Hammersmith, London.
Host: David Jacobs
Each song was performed by two different artists
Voting: 10 regional juries of 12 members with 1 vote each, located in Belfast, Newcastle, Bangor, Edinburgh, Manchester, Nottingham, Cardiff, Birmingham, Glasgow and London.

Song title	Performers	Place	Score
"Don't Cry Little Doll"	Bill Maynard & The Keynotes	4th	14
"Once"	Pauline Shephard & Carole Carr	2nd	23
"Seven"	Dennis Lotis & The Keynotes	=5th	13
**"All"**	**Patricia Bredin** & The Malcolm Lockyer Quartet	1st	39
"For Your Love"	Ronnie Hilton & Alan Bristow	=5th	13
"That’s The Way It Goes"	Lita Roza & Stan Roderick	3rd	18
Unknown~	Marion Ryan	SF	N/A
Unknown~	John Hanson	SF	N/A
Unknown~	Janie Marden	SF	N/A
Unknown~	Jill Day	SF	N/A
Unknown~	Edna Savage	SF	N/A
Unknown~	Bryan Johnson	SF	N/A
Unknown~	Lorrae Desmond	SF	N/A
Unknown~	Frank Horox	SF	N/A
Unknown~	George Mitchell Singers	SF	N/A
Unknown~	Frank Weir Quintet	SF	N/A
Unknown~	Shirley Eaton	SF	N/A
Unknown~	The Kentones	SF	N/A
Unknown~	Lee Lawrence	SF	N/A

~ Eliminated in one of three televised heats (Tuesday, 22 January, Tuesday, 29 January & Tuesday, 5 February).

1958 Not Held. No UK Entry at Eurovision Song Contest

=== Eurovision Song Contest British Final (1959–1960) ===
1959
Saturday, 7 February. BBC Television Theatre, London.
Host: Pete Murray
Voting: 7 regional juries from South of England, English Midlands, Northern England, Northern Ireland, Scotland, Wales, and the West of England, with 14 persons in each jury.

Song title	Performer	Place
**"Sing Little Birdie"**	**Pearl Carr & Teddy Johnson**	1st
"This Is My Town"	Lita Roza	2nd
"Suddenly"	Glen Mason	3rd
"One Lonely Heart"	Steve Martin	4th
"Oh, Oh, Reckon I Must Be in Love"	Valerie Shane	Unknown
"Success"	John Hanson	Unknown
"Love Me, Love Me"~	Sheila Buxton	SF
"How Could I Know?"~	Don Rennie	SF
"I'll Be With You"~	Marion Keene	SF
"That's It, That's Love!"~	Pearl Carr & Teddy Johnson	SF
"Cha Cha Chocola"~	Rosemary Squires	SF
"This I Will Tell My Son"~	Lester Ferguson	SF

~ Eliminated in one of two televised heats (Monday, 2 February & Thursday, 5 February).

1960
Saturday, 6 February. BBC Television Theatre, London.
Host: David Jacobs
Voting: 7 regional juries, with 15 people in each jury. Juries: South of England, English Midlands, North of England, Scotland, Wales, West of England and Northern Ireland.

Song title	Performer	Place
"Each Tomorrow"	Malcolm Vaughan	3rd
**"Looking High, High, High"**	**Bryan Johnson**	1st
"Love Me A Little"	Dennis Lotis	Unknown
"Mi Amor"	David Hughes	2nd
"When The Tide Turns"	Pearl Carr & Teddy Johnson	Unknown
"Unexpectedly"	Marion Keene	Unknown
"Girl with a Curl"	Ronnie Carroll	Unknown
"Pickin' Petals"~	Pearl Carr & Teddy Johnson	SF
"As The Big Dipper Dipped"~	Don Lang	SF
"Friendly Street"~	Benny Lee	SF
"Teenage Years"~	Vince Eager	SF
"Love, Kisses And Heartache"~	Marion Keene	SF

~ Eliminated in one of two televised heats (Tuesday, 2 February & Thursday, 4 February).

=== A Song For Europe (1961–1995) ===
1961
Wednesday, 15 February. BBC Television Theatre, London.
Hostess: Katie Boyle
Voting: 12 regional juries of 10 jurors with 1 vote each, located in Aberdeen, Glasgow, Belfast, Leeds, Bangor, Manchester, Norwich, Birmingham, Cardiff, London, Bristol and Southampton.

Song title	Performer	Place	Score
"Dream Girl"	Mark Wynter	4th	16
"The Girl Next Door"	Craig Douglas	=7th	3
"Why Can't We?"	Ricky Valance	3rd	24
"A Place in the Country"	Bryan Johnson	5th	6
"I Will Light A Candle"	Anne Shelton	6th	4
"Suddenly I'm in Love"	Steve Arlen	2nd	30
"Too Late For Tears"	Valerie Masters	=7th	3
"Tommy"	Teresa Duffy	=7th	3
**"Are You Sure?"**	**The Allisons**	1st	31

1962
Sunday, 11 February. BBC Television Theatre, London.
Host: David Jacobs
Voting: 14 regional juries in Aberdeen, Edinburgh, Glasgow, Belfast, Newcastle, Leeds, Manchester, Nottingham, Birmingham, Cardiff, London, Plymouth, Southampton and Bristol.

Song title	Performer	Place	Score
"Pretty Hair And Angel Eyes"	Robb Storme	5th	12
"Tell Tale"	The Brook Brothers	8th	7
"There's No-One in the Whole Wide World"	Jackie Lee	9th	3
"Look Look, Little Angel"	Johnny Angel	=6th	11
"Never Goodbye"	Karl Denver	4th	15
"My Kingdom for a Girl"	Doug Sheldon	=10th	2
**"Ring-A-Ding Girl"**	**Ronnie Carroll**	1st	59
"Get A Move On"	Brad Newman	12th	1
"You're For Real"	Rikki Price	=10th	2
"Alone Too Long"	Frank Ifield	2nd	26
"The Message in a Bottle"	Donna Douglas	3rd	19
"There's Never Been A Girl"	Kenny Lynch	=6th	11

1963
Saturday, 23 February. BBC Television Theatre, London.
Host: David Jacobs
Voting: 16 regional juries in Aberdeen, Edinburgh, Glasgow, Belfast, Newcastle, Leeds, Manchester, Nottingham, Norwich, Birmingham, Cardiff, London North, London South, Plymouth, Southampton and Bristol. 12 persons in each jury, awarding 3 points to their favourite, 2 points to the second and 1 point to the third.

Song title	Performer	Place	Score
"My Continental Love"	Anne Shelton	4th	9
**"Say Wonderful Things"**	**Ronnie Carroll**	1st	33
"If You Ever Leave Me"	Barry Barnett	2nd	20
"This Kind of Love"	Johnny Towers	6th	5
"Pick The Petals"	Maureen Evans	3rd	17
"A Day at the Seaside"	Vince Hill	5th	8
"The Little Cracked Bell of San Raquel"	Jimmy Justice	7th	4

1964
Friday, 7 February. BBC Television Theatre, London.
Host: David Jacobs
All songs performed by Matt Monro
Voting: 16 regional juries.

Song title	Place	Score
"Choose"	4th	16
"It's Funny How You Know"	6th	11
**"I Love The Little Things"**	1st	87
"I've Got The Moon on My Side"	2nd	43
"Ten Out of Ten"	5th	15
"Beautiful, Beautiful"	3rd	20

1965
Friday, 29 January. BBC Television Theatre, London.
Host: David Jacobs
All songs performed by Kathy Kirby on The Kathy Kirby Show
Voting: Viewers cast votes via postcard for their favourite song. Result broadcast on Friday, 12 February.

Song title	Place	Score
"I Won't Let You Go"	5th	Unknown
"My Only Love"	3rd	61,993
"I'll Try Not To Cry"	2nd	96,252
"Sometimes"	6th	Unknown
**"I Belong"**	1st	110,495
"One Day"	4th	Unknown

1966
Thursday, 27 January. BBC Television Theatre, London.
Host: David Jacobs
All songs performed by Kenneth McKellar on Kenneth McKellar's Song For Everyone (BBC1) and The Light Programme (BBC Radio).
Voting: Viewers cast votes via postcard for their favourite song. Result broadcast on Thursday, 3 February.

Song title	Place
"Country Girl"	2nd
"As Long As The Sun Shines"	3rd
"Comes The Time"	4th
"A Touch of the Tartan"	5th
**"A Man Without Love"**	1st

1967
Saturday, 25 February. BBC Television Theatre, London.
Host: Rolf Harris
All songs performed by Sandie Shaw on The Rolf Harris Show
Voting: Viewers cast votes via postcard for their favourite song, result broadcast on Saturday, 4 March.

Song title	Place
"Tell The Boys"	2nd
"I'll Cry Myself To Sleep"	3rd
"Had A Dream Last Night"	4th
**"Puppet on a String"**	1st
"Ask Any Woman"	5th

1968
Tuesday, 5 March. BBC Television Theatre, London.
Hostess: Cilla Black
All songs performed by Cliff Richard on Cilla
Voting: Viewers cast votes via postcard for their favourite song. Results broadcast on Tuesday, 12 March and announced by Tom Sloan.

Song title	Place	Score
"Wonderful World"	3rd	19,990
"Do You Remember?"	6th	4,200
"High 'n' Dry"	2nd	30,500
"The Sound of the Candyman's Trumpet"	4th	11,200
**"Congratulations"**	1st	171,300
"Little Rag Doll"	5th	10,400

1969
Saturday, 22 February. BBC Television Theatre, London.
Host: Michael Aspel
All songs performed by Lulu on the second series of her self-contained show
Voting: Viewers cast votes via postcard for their favourite song. Result broadcast on Saturday, 1 March and announced by Tom Sloan.

Song title	Place	Score
"Are You Ready For Love?"	5th	5,560
"March!"	2nd	38,418
"Come September"	3rd	11,362
"I Can't Go on Living Without You"	6th	5,087
**"Boom Bang-a-Bang"**	1st	56,476
"Bet Yer!"	4th	8,306

1970
Saturday, 7 March. BBC Television Theatre, London.
Host: Cliff Richard
All songs performed by Mary Hopkin on It's Cliff Richard!
Voting: Viewers cast votes via postcard for their favourite song. Result broadcast on Saturday, 14 March and announced by Bill Cotton.

Song title	Place	Score
"Three Ships"	3rd	60,330
"Early in the Morning of Your Life"	6th	15,090
"I'm Gonna Fall in Love Again"	2nd	74,670
"You've Everything You Need"	5th	39,360
"Can I Believe?"	4th	42,160
**"Knock, Knock (Who's There)?"**	1st	120,290

1971
Saturday, 20 February. BBC Television Theatre, London.
Host: Cliff Richard
All songs performed by Clodagh Rodgers on It's Cliff Richard! (BBC1) and The Acker Bilk Show (BBC Radio 2)
Voting: 8 Regional Juries in Belfast, Birmingham, Bristol, Cardiff, Glasgow, London, Manchester and Norwich, each with 10 jurors who could award 1 vote to their favourite songResult broadcast on Saturday, 27 February and announced by Bill Cotton.

Song title	Place	Score
"Look Left, Look Right"	=5th	6
"In My World of Beautiful Things"	4th	12
**"Jack in the Box"**	1st	22
"Another Time, Another Place"	=5th	6
"Wind of Change"	=2nd	17
"Someone To Love Me"	=2nd	17

1972
Saturday, 12 February. BBC Television Theatre, London.
Host: Cliff Richard
All songs performed by The New Seekers on It's Cliff Richard! (BBC1) and Pete Murray's Open House (BBC Radio 2)
Voting: Viewers cast votes via postcard for their favourite song. Results broadcast on Saturday, 19 February and announced by Bill Cotton.

Song title	Place	Score
"Out on the Edge of Beyond"	3rd	14,645
"Sing Out"	5th	7,412
"Why Can't We All Get Together?"	4th	11,337
"One By One"	2nd	27,314
"Songs of Praise"	6th	3,842
**"Beg, Steal or Borrow"**	1st	62,584

1973
Saturday, 24 February. BBC Television Theatre, London.
Hostess: Cilla Black
All songs performed by Cliff Richard on Cilla (BBC1) and Pete Murray's Open House (BBC Radio 2)
Voting: Viewers cast votes via postcard for their favourite song. Result broadcast on Saturday, 3 March and announced by Bill Cotton.

Song title	Place	Score
"Come Back, Billie Jo"	2nd	34,209
"Ashes To Ashes"	6th	17,115
"Tomorrow Rising"	4th	21,858
"The Days of Love"	5th	18,304
**"Power To All Our Friends"**	1st	125,505
"Help It Along"	3rd	25,369

1974
Saturday, 23 February. BBC Television Theatre, London.
Host: Jimmy Savile
All songs performed by Olivia Newton-John on Clunk, Click... As It Happens (BBC1) and Pete Murray's Open House (BBC Radio 2)
Voting: Viewers cast votes via postcard for their favourite song. Result broadcast on Saturday, 2 March. and announced by Bill Cotton.

Song title	Place	Score
"Have Love, Will Travel"	4th	15,266
"Lovin' You Ain't Easy"	5th	5,905
**"Long Live Love"**	1st	27,387
"Someday"	6th	5,520
"Angel Eyes"	2nd	18,018
"Hands Across The Sea"	3rd	15,365

1975
Saturday, 15 February. BBC Television Theatre, London.
Hostess: Lulu
All songs performed by The Shadows on Lulu (BBC1) and Pete Murray's Open House (BBC Radio 2)
Voting: Viewers cast votes via postcard for their favourite song. Result broadcast on Saturday, 22 February and announced by Bill Cotton.

Song title	Place	Score
"No, No, Nina"	6th	1,261
"This House Runs on Sunshine"	3rd	10,451
"Don't Throw It All Away"	4th	3,099
"Cool, Clear Air"	5th	1,601
"Stand Up Like A Man"	2nd	14,294
**"Let Me Be The One"**	1st	17,477

1976
Wednesday, 25 February. The Royal Albert Hall, London.
Host: Michael Aspel
Voting: 14 regional juries located in Bristol, Bangor, Leeds, Norwich, Newcastle, Aberdeen, Birmingham, Manchester, Belfast, Cardiff, Plymouth, Glasgow, Southampton and London. Each jury ranked the songs 1–12, awarding 12 points for their favourite down to 1 point for their least preferred. Trophies presented by Jimmy Gilbert.

Song title	Performer	Place	Score
"Wake Up"	Co-Co	2nd	138
"Do You Believe in Love at First Sight?"	Polly Brown	10th	71
**"Save Your Kisses For Me"**	**Brotherhood Of Man**	1st	140
"Couldn't Live Without You for a Day"	Hazell Dean	=8th	77
"A Love For All Seasons"	Champagne	=8th	77
"Ain't Gonna Take No for an Answer"	Frank Ifield	12th	21
"Maria"	Sunshine	7th	80
"Love's A Carousel"	Tammy Jones	6th	98
"Going to the Movies"	Joey Valentine	11th	52
"Love, Kiss And Run"	Sweet Dreams	4th	109
"Take The Money And Run"	Louisa Jane White	5th	100
"Queen of the Mardi Gras"	Tony Christie	3rd	129

Although all the regional scores were announced in turn by a spokesman (there were no female announcers), and many were recognisable to viewers; none of the voices were identified either by the spokesman or host Michael Aspel. This list is independently researched.

Jury spokespersons
Jury	Spokesperson
Bristol	Chris Denham
Bangor	Elfyn Thomas
Leeds	Brian Baines
Norwich	John Crowest
Newcastle	Mike Neville
Aberdeen	Gerry Davis
Birmingham	Tom Coyne
Manchester	Mike Riddoch
Belfast	Michael Baguley
Cardiff	Iwan Thomas
Plymouth	Donald Heighway
Glasgow	David Findlay
Southampton	Peter Macann
London	Ray Moore

1977
Wednesday, 9 March. The New London Theatre, London.
Host: Terry Wogan
Voting: 14 regional juries located in Belfast, Bristol, Aberdeen, Bangor, Leeds, London, Birmingham, Cardiff, Glasgow, Norwich, Newcastle, Manchester, Plymouth and Southampton. Each jury ranked the songs 1–12, awarding 12 points for their favourite down to 1 point for their least preferred.
(Show not televised due to strike action)

Song title	Performer	Place	Score
"What Do You Say To Love?"	Mary Mason	2nd	132
"Where Were You When I Needed Your Love?"	The Foundations	3rd	125
"Leave A Little Love"	Tony Monopoly	9th	66
"If Everybody Loved The Same As You"	Lyn Paul	=6th	74
"Just For You"	High Society	=6th	74
"A Little Give, A Little Take"	Carl Wayne	11th	62
**"Rock Bottom"**	**Lynsey de Paul & Mike Moran**	1st	143
"You're My Sweet Sensation"	Sweet Sensation	8th	73
"Swings And Roundabouts"	Val Stokes	12th	57
"Everybody Knows"	Beano	10th	60
"After All This Time"	Wesley, Park And Smith	5th	106
"Promises, Promises"	Rags	4th	120

Jury spokespersons
Jury	Spokesperson
Belfast	Michael Baguley
Bristol	Chris Denham
Aberdeen	Gerry Davis
Leeds	Brian Baines
Bangor	Emrys Jones
London	Ray Moore
Birmingham	David Shoot
Cardiff	Frank Lincoln
Glasgow	David Findlay
Manchester	Mike Riddoch
Southampton	Paul Harris
Norwich	Ian Masters
Newcastle	Mike Neville
Plymouth	Kevin Crooks

1978
Friday, 31 March. The Royal Albert Hall, London.
Host: Terry Wogan
Voting: 14 regional juries located in Belfast, Bristol, Aberdeen, Bangor, Leeds, London, Birmingham, Cardiff, Glasgow, Norwich, Newcastle, Manchester, Plymouth and Southampton. Each jury ranked the songs 1–12, awarding 12 points for their favourite down to 1 point for their least preferred. Trophies presented by Jimmy Gilbert.

Song title	Performer	Place	Score
"Shine It On"	Christian	=3rd	114
"Oh No, Look What You've Done"	Brown Sugar	=11th	49
"Door in My Face"	The Fruit Eating Bears	=11th	49
"Moments"	Jacquie Sullivan	6th	106
"Too Much in Love"	Sunshine	8th	81
"Lonely Nights"	Ronnie France	9th	68
"One Glance"	The Jarvis Brothers	=3rd	114
**"The Bad Old Days"**	**Co-Co**	1st	135
"We Got It Bad"	Bob James	10th	66
"Don't Bother To Knock"	Midnight	2nd	116
"Don't Let Me Stand in Your Way"	Babe Rainbow	7th	84
"Solid Love"	Labi Siffre	5th	110

Voting spokespersons

Region	Announcer
Aberdeen	Gerry Davis
Norwich	Chris Denham
Manchester	Mike Riddoch
Bangor	Gwyn Llewelyn
Southampton	Peter Macann
Leeds	Brian Baines
Belfast	Michael Bagerley
Bristol	Derek Jones
Glasgow	Ken Bruce
Birmingham	Tom Coyne
London	Ray Moore
Cardiff	Frank Lincoln
Newcastle	Mike Neville
Plymouth	Donald Hayway

1979
Thursday, 8 March. The Royal Albert Hall, London.
Host: Terry Wogan
Voting: 14 regional juries located in Belfast, Bristol, Aberdeen, Bangor, Leeds, London, Birmingham, Cardiff, Glasgow, Norwich, Newcastle, Manchester, Plymouth and Southampton. Each jury ranked the songs 1–12, awarding 12 points for their favourite down to 1 point for their least preferred based on audio recordings of the songs. At the time, Manchester's votes were not included in the final tally as the jury could not be contacted and songs 6 & 12 were declared joint 2nd. The scores and places were adjusted later once the Manchester scores had been confirmed.
(Show abandoned due to strike action)

Song title	Performer	Place	Score
**"Mary Ann"**	**Black Lace**	1st	132
"You Are My Life"	Lynda Virtu	8th	82
"Who Put The Shine on Your Shoes?"	Ipswich	=5th	90
"Mr. Moonlight"	Herbie Flowers & The Daisies	=5th	90
"Miss Caroline Newley"	M Squad	11th	44
"Call My Name"	Eleanor Keenan	3rd	109
"How Do You Mend a Broken Heart?"	Guys 'n' Dolls	10th	56
"All I Needed Was Your Love"	Linda Kendricks	12th	33
"Home Again (Living With You)"	Monte-Carlo	7th	83
"Let It All Go"	Sal Davis	9th	77
"Harry, My Honolulu Lover"	The Nolan Sisters	4th	101
"Fantasy"	Kim Clark	2nd	117

1980
Wednesday, 26 March. BBC Television Theatre, London.
Host: Terry Wogan
Voting: 14 regional juries located in Belfast, Bristol, Aberdeen, Bangor, Leeds, London, Birmingham, Cardiff, Glasgow, Norwich, Newcastle, Manchester, Plymouth and Southampton. Each jury ranked the songs 1–12, awarding 12 points for their favourite down to 1 point for their least preferred. Each jury then awarded 1 vote for the top two songs to break a tie. Trophies presented by Jimmy Gilbert.

Song title	Performer	Place	Score
"Don't Throw Your Love Away"	Scramble	6th	97
"Happy Everything"	Maggie Moone	2nd	137
"Easy"	Plain Sailing	=4th	111
"Here We'll Stay"	Sonja Jones	11th	56
**"Love Enough for Two"**	**Prima Donna**	1st	139
"Symphony For You"	Jacqui Scott	8th	67
"Love Is Alive"	Duke & The Aces	7th	94
"Everything Is Alright"	Roy Winston	10th	58
"Love Comes, Love Grows"	Midnite	9th	62
"Gonna Do My Best"	The Main Event	12th	45
"I Want To Be Me"	Pussyfoot	=4th	111
"Surrender"	Kim Clark	3rd	129

Voting spokespersons

Region	Announcer
Aberdeen	Gerry Davis
Newcastle	Mike Neville
Plymouth	Donald Hayway
Leeds	Brian Baines
Southampton	Peter Macann
Bangor	Alan Evans
London	Colin Berry
Cardiff	Iwan Thomas
Birmingham	David Stevens
Glasgow	Douglas Brock
Belfast	Mike Bagerley
Bristol	Derek Jones
Norwich	Jill Hewitt
Manchester	John Mundy

1981
Wednesday, 11 March. BBC Television Theatre, London.
Host: Terry Wogan
Voting: 7 regional juries located in Birmingham, Cardiff, Manchester, Belfast, Edinburgh, London and Bristol. Juries ranked the songs internally and awarded 15 points to their favourite, 12 to the second, 10 to the third, 9 to the fourth, 8 to the fifth, 7 to the sixth, 6 to the seventh and 5 to their least preferred.

Song title	Performer	Place	Score
"Not Without Your Ticket (Don't Go)"	Headache	7th	50
"All Cried Out"	Gary Benson	=4th	63
"For Only A Day"	Unity	8th	38
"Wish"	Beyond	3rd	67
**"Making Your Mind Up"**	**Bucks Fizz**	1st	97
"Have You Ever Been in Love?"	Gem (Note: Gem were originally named Paris and released the single of their song under that name. To avoid international confusion, they were asked to come up with a different name for the Song for Europe contest.)	=4th	63
"Where Are You Now?"	Lezlee Carling	6th	56
"Don't Panic"	Liquid Gold	2nd	70

Voting spokespersons

Region	Announcer
Birmingham	David Stevens
Cardiff	Iwan Thomas
Manchester	John Mundy
Belfast	Peter Dickson
Edinburgh	Jim O'Hara
London	Ray Moore
Bristol	Andy Batten-Foster

1982
Wednesday, 24 March. BBC Television Centre, London.
Host: Terry Wogan
Voting: 7 regional juries located in Glasgow, Birmingham, Bristol, Manchester, Belfast, London, Manchester and Cardiff. Juries ranked the songs internally and awarded 15 points to their favourite, 12 to the second, 10 to the third, 9 to the fourth, 8 to the fifth, 7 to the sixth, 6 to the seventh and 5 to their least preferred.

Song title	Performer	Place	Score
"Dancing in Heaven (Orbital Be-Bop)"	Q-Feel	6th	59
"No Matter How I Try"	Paul Curtis	=4th	60
"Every Step of the Way"	The Touring Company	=2nd	69
"Different Worlds, Different People"	Lovin' Feeling	=4th	60
"Every Day of My Life"	Good Looks	=2nd	69
"You're The Only Good Thing in My Life"	Rich Gypsy (Kay Webber)	8th	53
**"One Step Further"**	**Bardo**	1st	76
"How Long?"	The Weltons	7th	58

Voting spokespersons

Region	Announcer
Glasgow	Ken Bruce
Birmingham	David Freeman
Bristol	Andy Batten-Foster
Belfast	David Olver
London	Ray Moore
Manchester	John Mundy
Cardiff	Iwan Thomas

1983
Thursday, 24 March. BBC Television Theatre, London.
Host: Terry Wogan
Voting: 8 regional juries located in Birmingham, Cardiff, Manchester, Belfast, Edinburgh, London, Norwich and Bristol. Juries ranked the songs internally and awarded 15 points to their favourite, 12 to the second, 10 to the third, 9 to the fourth, 8 to the fifth, 7 to the sixth, 6 to the seventh and 5 to their least preferred.

Song title	Performer	Place	Score
**"I'm Never Giving Up"**	**Sweet Dreams**	1st	109
"I'm Going Home"	Sam Childs	8th	50
"All Around The World"	Stuart Slater	5th	63
"With Love"	Casablanca	3rd	72
"We've Got All The Time in the World"	Mirror	2nd	91
"Love on Your Mind"	Audio	4th	68
"When The Kissing Stops"	Rubic	5th	63
"Keeping Our Love Alive"	Ritzy	7th	60

Voting spokespersons

Region	Announcer
Cardiff	Iwan Thomas
Belfast	David Olver
Norwich	Ian Masters
Edinburgh	Ken Bruce
Bristol	Andy Batten-Foster
Birmingham	Marjorie Lofthouse
Manchester	John Mundy
London	Colin Berry

1984
Wednesday, 4 April. BBC Television Centre, London.
Host: Terry Wogan
Voting: 8 regional juries located in Edinburgh, Norwich, Belfast, London, Cardiff, Manchester, Bristol and Birmingham. Juries ranked the songs internally and awarded 15 points to their favourite, 12 to the second, 10 to the third, 9 to the fourth, 8 to the fifth, 7 to the sixth, 6 to the seventh and 5 to their least preferred.

Song title	Performer	Place	Score
"Magical Music"	Caprice	6th	60
"Look at Me Now"	Nina Shaw	3rd	78
"This Love Is Deep"	Bryan Evans	8th	53
**"Love Games"**	**Belle & The Devotions**	1st	112
"Where The Action Is"	First Division	2nd	79
"Let It Shine"	Miriam Ann Lesley	5th	62
"Imagination"	Sinitta	4th	77
"Stay in My Life"	Hazell Dean	7th	55

Voting spokespersons

Region	Announcer
Edinburgh	Ken Bruce
Norwich	Judi Lines
Belfast	Diane Harron
London	Colin Berry
Cardiff	Iwan Thomas
Manchester	Alan Yardley
Bristol	Vivien Creegor
Birmingham	Paul Coia

1985
Friday, 5 April. BBC Television Centre, London.
Host: Terry Wogan
Voting: 9 regional juries located in Belfast, Birmingham, Cardiff, Glasgow, London, Norwich, Bristol, Manchester and Plymouth. Juries ranked the songs internally and awarded 15 points to their favourite, 12 to the second, 10 to the third, 9 to the fourth, 8 to the fifth, 7 to the sixth, 6 to the seventh and 5 to their least preferred.

Song title	Performer	Place	Score
**"Love Is..."**	**Vikki**	1st	124
"I'm Crying"	Peter Beckett	7th	59
"The Clock on the Wall"	Alvin Stardust	3rd	90
"What We Say With Our Eyes"	James Oliver	6th	66
"Energy"	Des Dyer	4th	77
"Let Me Love You One More Time"	Annabel	5th	72
"Dancing in the Night"	Kerri Wells	2nd	101
"So Do I"	Mike Redway & Fiona Kennedy	7th	59

Voting spokespersons

Region	Announcer
Belfast	Jim Neely
Birmingham	Paul Coia
Cardiff	Iwan Thomas
Glasgow	Viv Lumsden
London	Colin Berry
Norwich	Stuart White
Bristol	Vivien Creegor
Manchester	John Mundy
Plymouth	Christopher Slade

1986
Wednesday, 2 April. BBC Television Centre, London.
Host: Terry Wogan
Voting: 11 regional juries located in Birmingham, Manchester, Bristol, Norwich, Newcastle, Cardiff, London, Leeds, Glasgow, Plymouth and Belast. Juries ranked the songs internally and awarded 15 points to their favourite, 12 to the second, 10 to the third, 9 to the fourth, 8 to the fifth, 7 to the sixth, 6 to the seventh and 5 to their least preferred. The final scores accord with the announced scores during the broadcast, whereas the scoreboard used in the telecast was incorrect due to a technical issue.

Song title	Performer	Place	Score
"Dreamer"	Vanity Fare	3rd	99
"Dancing With You Again"	Palace	4th	91
"No Easy Way To Love"	Colin Heywood	6th	80
"I'm Sorry"	Chad Brown	7th	78
"Tongue Tied"	Kenny Charles	5th	86
**"Runner in the Night"**	**Ryder**	1st	145
"Don't Hang Up on Love"	Jump	2nd	137
"The War of the Roses"	Future	8th	76

Voting spokespersons

Region	Announcer
Birmingham	Paul Coia
Manchester	John Mundy
Bristol	Angela Rippon
Norwich	David Platen
Newcastle	Mike Neville
Cardiff	Maureen Staffer
London	Colin Berry
Leeds	Linda Driburgh-Smith
Glasgow	Dougie Donnelly
Plymouth	Christopher Slade
Belfast	Rose Neill

1987
Friday, 10 April. BBC Television Centre, London.
Host: Terry Wogan
Voting: 9 regional juries located in Belfast, Birmingham, Bristol, Edinburgh, Cardiff, Manchester, London, Newcastle and Norwich. Juries ranked the songs internally and awarded 15 points to their favourite, 12 to the second, 10 to the third, 9 to the fourth, 8 to the fifth, 7 to the sixth, 6 to the seventh, 5 to the eighth, 3 to the ninth and 1 to their least preferred.

Song title	Performer	Place	Score
**"Only The Light"**	**Rikki**	1st	112
"The Lion Within"	Siy	8th	48
"I Want You"	Mike Stacey	5th	72
"Everybody"	Mal Pope	7th	58
"Too Hot To Handle"	Ann Turner	2nd	101
"Master of the Game"	Ian Prince	10th	34
"Just Let Me"	Gordon Campbell	9th	43
"Bless Your Lucky Stars"	Zuice	3rd	78
"What You Gonna Do?"	John T. Ford	4th	75
"Romeo"	Heavy Pettin'	6th	60

Voting spokespersons

Region	Announcer
Belfast	Stephanie Callister
Birmingham	Pamela Armstrong
Bristol	Angela Rippon
Edinburgh	Louise Welsh
Cardiff	Iwan Thomas
Manchester	John Mundy
London	Colin Berry
Newcastle	Simon Willis
Norwich	Susan Osman

1988
Friday, 25 March. BBC Television Centre, London.
Host: Terry Wogan
With guest commentators: Gloria Hunniford, Bruce Welch, Mike Batt and George Martin
Voting: Viewers voted by telephone for their favourite song. Scores announced by Gordon Robson.

Song title	Performer	Place	Score
"'Til The Night"	Catwalk	7th	22,358
"High Windows"	Camino	3rd	41,528
"Just A Memory"	Zoe	6th	27,783
"Make Your Dreams Come True"	FNAC	5th	28,946
"One More Chance"	Klass	8th	19,504
"Heart To Heart"	Clinging to the Wreckage	4th	30,382
"This Is The Kiss"	Two-Ché	2nd	73,785
**"Go"**	**Scott Fitzgerald**	1st	93,271

1989
Friday, 24 March. BBC Television Centre, London.
Host: Terry Wogan
With guest commentators: Lulu, Deke Arlon, Leslie Bricusse and Gary Davies
Voting: Viewers voted by telephone for their favourite song. Scores announced by Gordon Robson.

Song title	Performer	Place	Score
"Back in the Groove"	Frankie Johnson	6th	10,731
"I Can't Stop Loving You"	James Oliver	7th	9,110
"Shame"	Jane Alexander	3rd	47,664
"Just for the Good Times"	Danny Ellis	8th	6,777
"You Stepped Out of My Dreams"	Julie C	2nd	51,449
**"Why Do I Always Get It Wrong?"**	**Live Report**	1st	111,996
"Love Come Down"	The Pearls	4th	33,279
"Heaven Help My Heart"	Linda Carroll	5th	17,084

1990
Friday, 30 March. BBC Television Centre, London.
Host: Terry Wogan
With guest commentators: Gloria Hunniford, Cathy McGowan, Tim Rice and Carl Davis
Voting: Viewers voted by telephone for their favourite song. Scores announced by Gordon Robson.

Song title	Performer	Place	Score
"Better Be Good To Me"	Kelly	6th	13,179
"That Old Feeling Again"	Stephen Lee Garden	5th	14,447
"Never Give Up"	Thom Hardwell	8th	3,540
**"Give A Little Love Back to the World"**	**Emma**	1st	97,625
"Ball And Chain"	Les McKeown	5th	15,171
"Face in the Crowd"	Simon Spiro	7th	5,551
"Sentimental Again"	Kim Goody	3rd	17,986
"Where I Belong"	John Miles	2nd	38,966

1991
Friday, 29 March. BBC Television Centre, London.
Host: Terry Wogan
Voting: Viewers voted by telephone for their favourite song. Scores announced by Gordon Robson.

Song title	Performer	Place	Score
"We Will Protect You"	The Ravenscroft Partnership	5th	36,047
"Straight To Your Heart"	Christopher Ellis	7th	14,231
**"A Message To Your Heart"**	**Samantha Janus**	1st	108,896
"Nothing on This Earth"	Christie (Joanne Castle)	6th	17,296
"One Love"	Malcolm Roberts	8th	11,250
"A Little Bit of Heaven"	Lorraine Craig	3rd	61,589
"True Love"	Julie Finney	4th	58,146
"Lover Come In"	Brendan Faye	2nd	95,696

1992
Friday, 3 April. BBC Television Centre, London.
Host: Terry Wogan
All songs performed by Michael Ball
Voting: Viewers voted by telephone for their favourite song. Scores announced by Gordon Robson.

Song title	Place	Score
"This Is The Moment I've Been Waiting For"	5th	73,084
"Call on Me"	7th	48,419
"As Dreams Go By"	2nd	94,844
"Secret of Love"	3rd	91,705
"Every Day, Every Night"	8th	32,007
"Who Needs To Know?"	6th	52,126
**"One Step Out of Time"**	1st	153,792
"If You Need Another Love"	4th	86,476

1993
Friday, 9 April. BBC Television Centre, London.
Host: Terry Wogan
All songs performed by Sonia
Voting: Viewers voted by telephone for their favourite song. Scores announced by Gordon Robson.

Song title	Place	Score
"A Little Love"	4th	55,053
"I'm Gonna Put A Spell on You"	6th	27,795
"Life After Love"	5th	38,308
"It's Just A Matter of Time"	8th	18,251
**"Better The Devil You Know"**	1st	156,955
"Our World"	2nd	77,695
"So Much of Your Love"	3rd	70,454
"Trust"	7th	26,745

1994
Friday, 18 March. BBC Television Centre, London.
Host: Terry Wogan
With guest commentators: Richard O'Brien and Jonathan King
All songs performed by Frances Ruffelle
Voting: Viewers voted by telephone for their favourite song. Scores announced by Mike Anderries.

Song title	Place	Score
"Waiting in the Wings"	3rd	36,856
"Slowboat"	7th	6,549
"I Know These Things"	8th	6,269
"Sink Or Swim"	2nd	63,417
"Wrong Guy"	6th	7,406
"One More Night"	4th	20,608
"His Love"	5th	8,031
**"Lonely Symphony"**	1st	99,946

1995
Friday, 31 March. BBC Television Centre, London.
Host: Terry Wogan with Mark Goodier presenting a Top of the Pops preview show
With guest commentators: Tony Mortimer, Ian Dury, Cheryl Baker, Mike Read, Let Loose, Jonathan King, Scarlet and Bruno Brookes
Voting: Viewers voted by telephone for their favourite song. Scores announced by Mike Anderries.

Song title	Performer	Place	Score
"I Need You"	Deuce	3rd	73,467
"Spinning Away"	Paul Harris	7th	19,239
"I'm Just Your Puppet on a ... (String!)"	Londonbeat	6th	35,434
"Go For the Heart"	Sox	4th	65,436
"Then There's a Knock at the Door"	FFF	8th	17,216
"One Gift of Love"	Dear Jon	2nd	81,359
"Rainbows and You"	Simon Spiro	5th	43,299
**"Love City Groove"**	**Love City Groove**	1st	140,174

=== The Great British Song Contest (1996–1999) ===
1996
Friday, 8 March. BBC Television Centre, London.
Host: Terry Wogan
Voting: Viewers voted by telephone for their favourite song.

Song title	Performer	Place	Score
"Find Love"	Layla	4th	Unknown
"I Gave You Everything"	Code Red	2nd	41,791
"I Never Knew"~	Esseness	SF	N/A
"Sometimes It Rains"~	Dan Anderson	SF	N/A
"I Just Wanna Make Love 2U"~	Lois	SF	N/A
"Louise"~	Twin Hazey	SF	N/A
"A Little Love"	Zeitiah Massiah	3rd	41,105
**"Just A Little Bit"**	**Gina G**	1st	113,576

~ Eliminated in a televised heat hosted by Nicky Campbell.

1997
Sunday, 9 March. BBC Television Centre, London.
Host: Dale Winton
Voting: Viewers voted by telephone for their favourite song. Result broadcast on Saturday, 15 March.

Song title	Performer	Place	Score
"Can't You See I'm Crying?"*	Paul Varney	SF	N/A
"For the Life You Don't Yet Know"	Sam Blue	4th	Unknown
"Heart of Stone"*	Dave Black	SF	N/A
"Lighten Up"*	B-Yond	SF	N/A
**"Love Shine A Light"**	**Katrina & The Waves**	1st	69,830
"Room for Change"*	Laura Pallas	SF	N/A
"Yodel in the Canyon of Love"	Do-Re-Mi featuring Kerry	2nd	58,696
"You Stayed Away Too Long"	Joanna May	3rd	51,584

* Eliminated in a radio only heat hosted by Terry Wogan and Ken Bruce.

1998
Sunday, 15 March. BBC Television Centre, London.
Host: Terry Wogan
Voting: Viewers voted by telephone for their favourite song. Result broadcast on Saturday, 21 March.

Song title	Performer	Place	Score
"Don't It Make You Feel So Good?"	Alberta	2nd	66,278
"Give It Up"*	Lisa Millett	SF	N/A
"I'll Never Be Lonely Again"	Sapphire	3rd	65,712
"Suddenly (Took So Many Years)"*	Farrell Lennon	SF	N/A
"When We're Alone (We Dream)"	The Collective	4th	53,950
"When We Were in Love"*	Mandy Wilson	SF	N/A
**"Where Are You?"**	**Imaani**	1st	70,421
"Wish You Were Here"*	Anita Madigan	SF	N/A

* Eliminated in a radio only heat hosted by Terry Wogan and Ken Bruce.

1999
Sunday, 7 March. BBC Elstree Studios, Borehamwood.
Hostess: Ulrika Jonsson
Voting: Viewers voted by telephone for their favourite song. Result broadcast on Friday, 12 March.

Song title	Performer	Place	Score
"All Time High"*	Energia	SF	N/A
"Fly"*	Cheryl Beattie	SF	N/A
**"Say It Again"**	**Precious**	1st	52,457
"Separate Lives"*	Susan Black	SF	N/A
"So Strange"	Alberta	2nd	51,708
"Until You Saved My Life Tonight"	Sister Sway	3rd	51,398
"Wait Until The Morning"*	Leanne Cartwright	SF	N/A
"You've Taken My Dreams"	Jay	4th	43,765

* Eliminated in a radio only heat hosted by Terry Wogan and Ken Bruce.

=== A Song For Europe (2000–2003) ===
2000
Sunday, 20 February. BBC Elstree Studios, Borehamwood.
Hostess: Katy Hill
Voting: Viewers voted by telephone for their favourite song.

Song title	Performer	Semi Final score	Semi Final place	Final score	Final place
"Aria"*	Helene	1,826	7th	N/A	N/A
"Crazy"	Catherine Porter	9,140	1st	29,348	3rd
**"Don't Play That Song Again"**	**Nicki French**	5,550	2nd	47,355	1st
"I Won't Let You Do This To Me"	Sexy Sadie	4,403	3rd	10,494	4th
"Only The Women Know"	Six Chix	4,115	4th	42,309	2nd
"Stand Up"*	Jane Tretton	2,182	6th	N/A	N/A
"The Answer"*	Catherine Porter	1,635	8th	N/A	N/A
"Wherever You Go"*	India	3,254	5th	N/A	N/A

* Eliminated in a radio only heat hosted by Terry Wogan and Ken Bruce.

2001
Sunday, 11 March. BBC Elstree Studios, Borehamwood.
Hostess: Katy Hill
Voting: Viewers voted by telephone for their favourite song.

Song title	Performer	Place	Score
"Just Another Rainbow"	Lucy Randell	3rd	19,337
"King of Love"*	Charlotte Henry	SF	N/A
"Men"	Nanne Grönvall	4th	Unknown
**"No Dream Impossible"**	**Lindsay D**	1st	45,564
"That's My Love (For You)"	Tony Moore	2nd	31,895
"To Die For"*	Luke Galliana	SF	N/A
"Twisted"*	Moneypenny	SF	N/A
"Why Should I Love You?"*	Obsession	SF	N/A

* Eliminated in a radio only heat hosted by Terry Wogan and Ken Bruce.

2002
Sunday, 3 March. BBC Elstree Studios, Borehamwood.
Hosts: Christopher Price and Claire Sweeney
Voting: Viewers voted by telephone for their favourite song.

Song title	Performer	Place	Score
"Lovestruck"*	Honey Trap	SF	N/A
"Never in a Million Years"	Zee Asha	Disqualified	N/A
"When You're Around"*	Paula O'Neil	SF	N/A
"Fade Away"*	Pulse	SF	N/A
"I Give In"	Surf N Turf	4th	Unknown
"Every Step of the Way"	Level Best	3rd	8,927
"DJ Romeo"	Tricia Penrose	2nd	28,621
**"Come Back"**	**Jessica Garlick**	1st	67,998

* Eliminated in a radio only heat hosted by Terry Wogan & Ken Bruce.

2003
Sunday, 2 March. BBC Television Centre, London.
Host: Terry Wogan
Voting: Viewers voted by telephone for their favourite song. The votes were then divided into 6 regions: Scotland, Southern England, Northern Ireland, English Midlands, Northern England and Wales, with 12 points given to the highest scoring song in each region, 10 to the second, 9 to the third and 0 to the fourth placed song.

Song title	Performer	Place	Score
"Do Anything For Your Love"*	Fenix	SF	N/A
"Ever Since That Night"	Mimi	3rd	54
"First Night"*	SK (Steamy Knights)	SF	N/A
"Now And Forever" (aka "Wait for the Moment")	Simon Chapman	4th	0
**"Cry Baby"**	**Jemini**	1st	68
"Help Me"	Emily Reed	2nd	64
"Smile"*	Gallico	SF	N/A
"Rainy Day in Summer"*	Ben Plus One	SF	N/A

* Eliminated in a radio only heat hosted by Terry Wogan and Ken Bruce.

"Now And Forever" was performed in the radio only semi final by Esther Hart and was titled "Wait for the Moment". Hart withdrew when she qualified for the Dutch National Final. Her replacement was the group 'United Colours of Sound', who also withdrew before the televised final; being replaced in turn by Simon Chapman.

Voting spokespersons

Region	Announcer
South	Esther Rantzen
Wales	Jessica Garlick
Northern Ireland	Joe Mace
Midlands	Mel and Sue
North England	Matt Baker
Scotland	Nicholas Parsons

=== Eurovision: Making Your Mind Up! (2004–2007) ===
2004
Saturday, 28 February. BBC Television Centre, London.
Hosts: Terry Wogan and Gaby Roslin, with Paddy O'Connell on BBC Three
With panellists: Carrie Grant, Harry Hill and Lorraine Kelly
Voting: Viewers voted by telephone for their favourite song. The votes were then divided into 7 regions: South West England, Wales, Northern Ireland, English Midlands, South East England, Northern England and Scotland, with 12 points given to the highest scoring song in each region, 8 to the second, 6 to the third, 4 to the fourth, 2 to the fifth and 0 to the lowest ranked song. Votes given by SMS (regardless of location) were separately allocated as a percentage of the vote received and added to the regional scores.

Song title	Performer	Place	Score
"Weekend (Gotta Work)"	Enrap-Ture	4th	37
**"Hold Onto Our Love"**	**James Fox**	1st	120
"Me Without You"	Haifa	6th	9
"Leading Me On"	Hyrise	2nd	82
"With You I Believe"	Haydon Eshun	5th	17
"It Just Gets Better"	Madison Taylor	3rd	59

Voting spokespersons

Region	Announcer(s)
South East	Fearne Cotton
Scotland	Colin McAllister and Justin Ryan
Northern Ireland	Malachi Cush
Wales	Colin Jackson
North	Sonia
Midlands	Hayley Evetts
South West	Sharron Davies
SMS	Lorraine Kelly

2005
Saturday, 5 March. BBC Television Centre, London.
Hosts: Terry Wogan and Natasha Kaplinsky
With panellists: Jonathan Ross, Bruno Tonioli, Paddy O'Connell and Natalie Cassidy
Voting: Viewers voted by telephone for their favourite song. The votes were then divided into 8 regions: South West England, South East England, Wales, Northern Ireland, English Midlands, Northern England, Scotland and any votes cast via the Internet (regardless of location), with 12 points given to the highest scoring song in each region, 8 to the second, 6 to the third, 4 to the fourth and 2 to the lowest ranked song. Votes given by SMS were separately allocated as a percentage of the vote received and added to the regional scores. Trophies presented by Sandie Shaw.

Song title	Performer	Place	Score
**"Touch My Fire"**	**Javine**	1st	116
"Brand New Day"	Tricolore	4th	58
"Flashback"	Gina G	5th	20
"Guardian Angel"	Andy Scott-Lee	3rd	61
"Not Just Anybody"	Katie Price (aka Jordan)	2nd	101

Voting spokespersons

Region	Announcer(s)
Northern Ireland	Zoe Salmon
North	Stuart Hall
Scotland	Colin McAllister and Justin Ryan
Wales	James Fox
South West	Sharron Davies
Midlands	Denise Lewis
South East	Fearne Cotton
SMS	Sandie Shaw

2006
Saturday, 4 March. BBC Television Centre, London.
Hosts: Terry Wogan and Natasha Kaplinsky
With panellists: Jonathan Ross, Bruno Tonioli, Fearne Cotton and Kelly Osbourne
Voting: Viewers voted by telephone for their favourite song. The votes were then divided into 8 regions: Northern England, South East England, Scotland, English Midlands, Northern Ireland, Wales, South West England and any votes cast via the Internet (regardless of location), with 12 points given to the highest scoring song in each region, 8 to the second, 6 to the third, 4 to the fourth, 2 to the fifth and 0 to the lowest ranked song. Votes given by SMS were separately allocated as a percentage of the vote received and added to the regional scores. Trophies presented by Elena Paparizou.

Song title	Performer	Place	Score
"Play Your Game"	Goran Kay	6th	14
"Whisper to Me"	Kym Marsh (aka Kym Ryder)	4th	53
**"Teenage Life"**	**Daz Sampson**	1st	151
"All About You"	City Chix	3rd	55
"Hand on My Heart"	Four Story	5th	17
"It's a Beautiful Thing"	Antony Costa	2nd	96

Voting spokespersons

Region	Announcer(s)
Scotland	Michelle McManus
Wales	Maggot
Northern Ireland	Roy Walker
North	Kelli Young
Midlands	Rustie Lee
London	Alistair Appleton
South West	Simon Grant
SMS	Javine

2007
Saturday, 17 March. Maidstone Studios, Maidstone, Kent.
Hosts: Terry Wogan and Fearne Cotton
With panellists: John Barrowman and Mel Giedroyc
Voting: Viewers voted by phone for their favourite song. Following an initial round of voting, the top two songs were performed again and voted on a second time. No details of the scores were given.

Song title	Performer	Place
"(Don't It Make You) Happy!"	Liz McClarnon	5th
"I Can"	Brian Harvey	6th
"Big Bro Thang"	Big Brovaz	3rd
"I'll Leave My Heart"	Cyndi	2nd
**"Flying The Flag (For You)"**	**Scooch**	1st
"They Don't Make 'Em Like They Used To"	Justin Hawkins & Beverlei Brown	4th

=== Eurovision: Your Decision (2008) ===
2008
Saturday, 1 March. BBC Television Centre, London.
Hosts: Terry Wogan and Claudia Winkleman
With panellists/Judges: John Barrowman and Carrie Grant
Voting: LoveShy, Rob McVeigh and Andy Abraham were eliminated by judges John Barrowman and Carrie Grant. Andy Abraham was then 'saved' by Terry Wogan and reinstated. Viewers voted by phone for their favourite of the four remaining songs. Following an initial round of voting, the top two songs were performed again and voted on a second time. No details of the scores were given.

Song title	Performer	Place
"Mr. Gorgeous"	LoveShy	=5th
"It's You"	The Revelations	=3rd
"I Owe It All To You"	Rob McVeigh	=5th
"Changes"	Simona Armstrong	=3rd
**"Even If"**	**Andy Abraham**	1st
"Woo (You Make Me)"	Michelle Gayle	2nd

=== Eurovision: Your Country Needs You (2009–2010) ===
2009
Saturday, 31 January. BBC Television Centre, London.
Host: Graham Norton
With Judge: Andrew Lloyd Webber and Panellists: Lulu, Diane Warren, Duncan James, Arlene Phillips, Emma Bunton and Alesha Dixon
Voting: Viewers voted by telephone for their favourite act each week. The bottom 2 acts were then judged by Andrew Lloyd Webber who chose to 'save' one of the 2. On the final show, viewers voted by telephone for their favourite of the three remaining acts. No details of the scoring was given.

Song title	Performer	Place
"It's My Time"	Mark Evans	3rd
"It's My Time"	The Twins	2nd
**"It's My Time"**	**Jade Ewen**	1st

Colour key
Act received the most public votes
Act was in the "danger zone"
Act was eliminated by Andrew Lloyd Webber

Weekly results per act
Act	Heat 1	Heat 2	Heat 3	Final
Jade Ewen	Safe	**Safe**	**Safe**	**Winner**
Nicola and Francine	Safe	**Safe**	**Safe**	**Runner-up**
Mark Evans	Safe	**Safe**	**Safe**	**3rd place**
Emperors of Soul	Safe	**Safe**	**Eliminated**	Eliminated (Heat 3)
Charlotte Finlay	Safe	**Eliminated**	Eliminated (Heat 2)	
Damien Flood	Eliminated	Eliminated (Heat 1)		

2010
Friday, 12 March. BBC Television Centre, London.
Host: Graham Norton
With Judge: Pete Waterman and Panellists: Bruno Tonioli, Jade Ewen and Mike Stock
Voting: Three singing acts - Miss Fitz, Uni5 and Karen Harding - were eliminated by judge Pete Waterman. Viewers voted by telephone for their favourite of the three remaining acts. No details of the scoring was given.

Song title	Performer	Place
"That Sounds Good To Me"	Alexis Gerred	2nd
"That Sounds Good To Me"	Esma Akkilic	3rd
**"That Sounds Good To Me"**	**Josh Dubovie**	1st

=== Internal selections (2011–2015) ===
There was no televised national selection procedure for the UK Eurovision entrant from 2011 to 2015.

2011
Blue were selected to represent Britain in the Eurovision Song Contest 2011 internally by the BBC, with the song "I Can", written by Duncan James, Lee Ryan, Ciaron Bell, Ben Collier, Ian Hope, Liam Keenan and 'StarSign'. In place of a national final, a one-hour documentary following the groups preparations for Germany, entitled Eurovision: Your Country Needs Blue was broadcast by BBC One on 16 April 2011.

2012
Engelbert Humperdinck was selected internally by the BBC to perform "Love Will Set You Free". The song was written by Grammy award-winning producer Martin Terefe and Ivor Novello winner Sacha Skarbek, who co-wrote the James Blunt hit "You're Beautiful".

2013
An internal selection followed again in 2013, with Bonnie Tyler being chosen to represent the UK with the song "Believe in Me", written and composed by Desmond Child, Lauren Christy and Chris Braide.

2014
Another internal selection followed in 2014, with Molly being chosen to represent the UK with the song "Children of the Universe", co-written by herself and Swedish producer Anders Hansson. However, Smitten-Downes was a relatively unknown artist who was discovered through the BBC Introducing platform.

2015
A fifth internal selection took place in 2015, although the BBC accepted submissions from the public and song writing community. Electro Velvet were chosen to represent the UK with the song "Still in Love With You", co-written by Adrian Bax White and David Mindel, who had written many previous songs for the UK heats, his best result being two joint 2nd songs in 1982.

=== Eurovision: You Decide (2016–2019) ===
2016
Friday, 26 February. The O2 Forum, Kentish Town, London.
Hostess: Mel Giedroyc
With panellists: Carrie Grant, Katrina Leskanich and Jay Revell
Voting: Viewers voted by telephone and/or online for their favourite song. No details of the scores or places were given.

Song title	Performer	Place
"When You Go"	Dulcima	Unplaced
"A Better Man"	Matthew James	Unplaced
"Until Tomorrow"	Darline	Unplaced
"Miracle"	Karl William Lund	Unplaced
"Shine a Little Light"	Bianca	Unplaced
**"You're Not Alone"**	**Joe and Jake**	1st

2017
Friday, 27 January. Eventim Apollo, Hammersmith, London.
Hostess: Mel Giedroyc
With panellists: Bruno Tonioli, Sophie Ellis-Bextor and CeCe Sammy
Voting: Viewers voted by telephone and/or online for their favourite song. The panel of experts, which formed part of the eight-member jury panel, also voted during the show. No details of the scores or places were given.

Song title	Performer	Place
"I Wish I Loved You More"	Holly Brewer	Unplaced
"Light Up the World"	Danyl Johnson	Unplaced
**"Never Give Up on You"**	**Lucie Jones**	1st
"Freedom Hearts"	Olivia Garcia	Unplaced
"What Are We Made Of"	Nate Simpson	Unplaced
"I Don't Wanna Fight"	Salena Mastroianni	Unplaced

2018
Wednesday, 7 February. Brighton Dome, Brighton.
Hosts: Mel Giedroyc and Måns Zelmerlöw
With panellists: Rylan, Rochelle Humes and Tom Fletcher
Voting: Viewers voted by telephone and/or online for their favourite song, combined with the votes from the eight-member jury, to select the winner. The panel of experts did not vote this year and no details of the scores or places were given.

Song title	Performer	Place
"Crazy"	RAYA	Unplaced
"Astronaut"	Liam Tamne	Unplaced
"Legends"	Asanda Jezile	Unplaced
"You"	Jaz Ellington	Unplaced
**"Storm"**	**SuRie**	1st
"I Feel the Love"	Goldstone	Unplaced

2019
Friday, 8 February. Dock10, MediaCityUK, Salford, Greater Manchester.
Hosts: Mel Giedroyc and Måns Zelmerlöw
With panellists: Rylan, Marvin Humes and Mollie King
Voting: Three songs competed in three "song-offs", where each song was performed in two musically different styles by two different artists, with one artist from each pair (chosen by the expert panel) going through to a final public vote. Following this, viewers then voted by telephone and/or online for their favourite song to select the winner. No details of the scores or places were given.

Song title	Performer	Result	Place
"Sweet Lies"	Kerrie-Anne	Advanced	Unplaced
"Sweet Lies"	Anisa	Eliminated	N/A
"Freaks"	Jordan Clarke	Advanced	Unplaced
"Freaks"	MAID	Eliminated	N/A
"Bigger than Us"	Holly Tandy	Eliminated	N/A
**"Bigger than Us"**	**Michael Rice**	Advanced	1st

=== Internal selection (2020–present) ===
There was no televised national selection procedure for the UK Eurovision entry.

2020

On 27 February 2020, BBC announced that James Newman would represent the United Kingdom in the Eurovision Song Contest 2020 with the song, "My Last Breath". The Eurovision Song Contest 2020 was eventually cancelled.

2021

On 19 February 2021, BBC confirmed that Newman would represent the United Kingdom in the 2021 contest with the song "Embers". The BBC also announced the renewed collaboration between BBC Studios and record label BMG in finding the song. The song was released and published by BMG after being revealed in March 2021.

2022

On 10 March 2022, BBC revealed that Sam Ryder would represent the UK at the Eurovision Song Contest 2022 in Turin, Italy, with the song "Space Man".

2023

Mae Muller was announced as the chosen entrant with her song "I Wrote a Song" on 9 March 2023.

2024

On 16 December 2023, Olly Alexander was announced as the selected artist for the 2024 Eurovision Song Contest in Malmö. Alexander made the announcement during the final of the 21st series of Strictly Come Dancing. Alexander's song for the contest "Dizzy", co-written with Danny L Harle, was released on March 1, 2024.

2025

On 7 March 2025, during The Scott Mills Breakfast Show on BBC Radio 2, Remember Monday were officially confirmed as the British representatives with the song "What the Hell Just Happened?".

2026

On 17 February 2026, the BBC announced that Look Mum No Computer would represent the country. On 2 March 2026, it was announced on The Scott Mills Breakfast Show that the title of the competing song by Look Mum No Computer was "Eins, Zwei, Drei", and it would receive its first play on 6 March 2026 on the same show.

== List of multiple contestants ==
Excludes internally selected entrants with no multi-artist national selection participations, uncredited backing singers and musicians, but includes members of groups named as such.

Table key
1	Winner
2	Second place
3	Third place
X	Remaining places
◁	Last place
▽	Unplaced finalist
◇	Semi-finalist
☆	Internal selection

Artist	1st participation	2nd participation	3rd participation	4th participation
John Hanson	1957 ◇	1959 ▽		
Dennis Lotis	1957	1960 ▽		
Lita Roza	1957	1959	1960 ▽	
Bryan Johnson	1959 ◇	1960	1961 X	
Pearl Carr	1959	1960 ▽		
Teddy Johnson	1959	1960 ▽		
Marion Keene	1959	1960 ◇		
Ronnie Carroll	1960 ▽	1962	1963	
Anne Shelton	1961 X	1963 X		
Frank Ifield	1962	1976 ◁		
Lyn Paul	1972 (The New Seekers) ☆	1977 X		
Cheryl Baker	1976 (Co-Co)	1978 (Co-Co)	1980 (The Main Event) ◁	1981 (Bucks Fizz)
Terry Bradford	1976 (Co-Co)	1978 (Co-Co)	1980 (The Main Event) ◁	
Keith Hasler	1976 (Co-Co)	1978 (Co-Co)	1980 (The Main Event) ◁	
Polly Brown	1976 X	1976 (Sweet Dreams) X		
Hazell Dean	1976 X	1984 X		
Sunshine	1976 X	1978 X		
Tony Jackson	1976 (Sweet Dreams) X	1978 (Midnight)		
Beano	1977 X	1980 (Scramble) X		
Nichola Martin	1977 (Rags) X	1981 (Gem aka Paris) X		
Kim Clark	1979	1980		
Sally-Ann Triplett	1980 (Prima Donna)	1982 (Bardo)		
Lance Aston	1980 (Prima Donna)	1983 (Audio) X		
Jane Robbins	1980 (Prima Donna)	1989 (The Pearls) X		
Paul Curtis	1980 (Duke & The Aces) X	1982 X		
Tim Clark	1980 (Duke & The Aces) X	1983 (Audio) X	1984 (First Division)	
Annabel (Layton)	1981 (Unity) ◁	1985 X		
Bobby McVay	1982 (Lovin' Feeling) X	1983 (Sweet Dreams)		
Samantha Spencer Lane	1982 (Lovin' Feeling) X	1983 (Casablanca)		
Carla Donnelly	1983 (Casablanca)	1984 (First Division)		
Des Dyer	1983 (Casablanca)	1985 X		
Linda Hayes	1984 (Caprice) X	2000 (Six Chix)		
David Ian Lane	1984 (First Division)	1986 (Jump)		
Peter Beckett	1985 X	1986 (Jump)		
James Oliver	1985 X	1988 (Klass) ◁	1989 X	
Linda Carroll	1988 (Klass) ◁	1989 X		
Nicola Jackson	1988 (Two-Ché)	1999 (Sister Sway)		
Simon Spiro	1990 X	1995 X		
Sam Blue	1996 (Esseness) X	1997 ◁		
Gina G	1996	2005 ◁		
Alberta	1998	1999		
Catherine Porter (Note: Catherine Porter had two songs shortlisted for A Song for Europe 2000, both composed by herself and Tony Moore. Her composition "The Answer" was eliminated in the radio semi-final where it placed last (8th), however "Crazy" qualified in 1st place and thus progressed to the televised national final where it placed 3rd.)	2000 ◇	2000		
Antony Costa	2006	2011 (Blue) ☆		

== See also ==
- UK national selection for the Eurovision Song Contest
- UK Eurovision Song Contest entries discography
