= Marion Davis =

Marion Davis may refer to:

- Marion Keene, known as Marion Davis, British big band singer
- Marion Davis Berdecio, born Marion Davis, spy

== See also ==
- Marion Davies, American film actress
- Marion Davies (figure skater), British figure skater
