= George Hurd =

American composer

George Hurd is an American composer whose work focuses primarily on electroacoustic music combining classical instrumentation and electronics. He has also written a substantial amount of music for solo electronics and classical chamber ensemble. He is based in Berlin, Germany and heads The Hurd Ensemble, a chamber group dedicated to performing his pieces. A large portion of his work is concert music for The Hurd Ensemble and other groups/artists such as the Grammy-winning Third Coast Percussion, Elevate Ensemble, and violinist Carla Kihlstedt.

He has collaborated with numerous artists, such as German experimental electronic composer Hainbach, and American composer Danny Clay. He released Nightmare Light, a self-titled EP with composer Joel St. Julien. He is currently working on an upcoming project with guitartist/composer Markus Reuter, known for his work with the trio Stickmen.

He has launched a travel-based composition project called Echolocation based on his travels throughout Europe, North America, and New Zealand using location-specific sound-recordings and The Hurd Ensemble to create pieces about each place he visited. He premiered a solo electronic version of the suite at the Mutek festival in 2020.

== Electroacoustic Music ==
His most notable work includes the body of electro-acoustic music written for his group, The Hurd Ensemble, namely the pieces included on his 2016 Innova Recordings album, Navigation Without Numbers, which includes 11 pieces for combinations of violin, viola, cello, bass, piano, vibes, harp, and electronics, as well as a piece - also entitled Navigation Without Numbers - for solo violin and electronics written for and recorded by violinist/composer Carla Kihlstedt. In July 2016 The Hurd Ensemble performed at Kennedy Center in Washington D.C., a special request of Kennedy Center composer-in-residence Mason Bates.

In 2023 he released a piece for flutes, cellos, piano, and electronics entitled Silent Winter on the Berlin-based 7K! Records, and in 2024 released Nuremberg a self-performed track for tape-processed solo piano on UK-based Accidental Records.

Additionally, Hurd composed a piece for piano and electronics entitled Vivarium, for pianist Elyse Weakley. It premiered in March 2015 alongside pieces by Mason Bates, Aphex Twin and Anna Clyne. It was subsequently performed at the Kennedy Center for Performing Arts in Washington D.C. and the National Opera Center in New York.

== Electronic Music ==
Hurd has performed extensively as a solo electronic act, including sets at the famed Mutek Festival, Rhythmfest (the Chicago percussive arts festival curated by Grammy-winning Third Coast Percussion), Codame's Art + Tech Festival at San Francisco's Palace of Fine Arts, the CSMA Electronic Music Festival, and countless other performances across the United States.

== Music for Film ==
Hurd scored a significant portion of the feature-length documentary To the Edge of the Sky with celebrated film composer Mark Orton (who also mixed Navigation Without Numbers, Hurd's record with the Hurd Ensemble).

His most substantial film score is for the feature-length documentary Freeing Bernie Baran, directed by Daniel Alexander. The instrumentation for this score would be the inspiration for his choice in instruments for The Hurd Ensemble.

He also scored the shorts Jessica's Gift and An Ordinary Moment for filmmaker Joseph Voves. An Ordinary Moment won for Best Original Music at the 2006 Chicago 48-Hour Film Festival.

== Music for Podcasts ==
- Catastrophe Cafe (2025): Original music and audio editing
- Winds of Change (2020): contributed original music
- Waiting for Cops (2019): controbuted original music

== Music for Dance ==
He has written a number of pieces of music for dance, most notably with choreographer Loni Landon and LEVYdance on Meet Me Normal (2014) and the murmur of yearning (2014) for Kinetech Arts.

- Meet Me Normal - LEVYdance and choreographer Loni Landon (AMP 2014 - ODC Theater, San Francisco - November 9, 2014)
- the murmur of yearning - Kinetech Arts (2015)

== Awards and commissions ==
- Commission by Grammy-winning Third Coast Percussion, to write What Stories We Tell for percussion quartet and electronics.
- Commission for Undercover Music Series. Morning Bell by Radiohead arranged for violin, viola, cello, bass, bass clarinets, piano, steel pans, vibraphone, singer and electronics.
- Composer's Residency, 2011 - New Spectrum Foundation - New York NY: Awarded a composer's residency at the New Spectrum Foundation in New York, NY from Oct 2011 - Jan 2012. Composed Navigation Without Numbers, a single-movement piece for solo violin and electronics written for violinist/composer Carla Kihlstedt.
- Commission from Musiktheater Im Revier Gelsenkirchen, Germany, 2010. Two pieces for the Internetoper project: Fulcrum and Flux for violin, cello, bass clarinet, piano, vibraphone and electronics.
- Winner of Best Music: 48 Hour Film Competition - Chicago 2006

== Discography ==
- Nuremberg (Antechamber Compilation Vol. 3, Accidental Records, 2024)
- Silent Winter (Ambient Layers Vol. 2, 7K! Records, 2023)
- What Stories We Tell (Currents Vol. I, Third Coast Percussion Records, 2022)
- Chernobyl Remastered (Cloth Map, 2022)
- Navigation Without Numbers: Remixes (Innova Recordings, 2020)
- Chernobyl OST (Cloth Map, 2017)
- Navigation Without Numbers (Innova Recordings, 2016)
- Nightmare Light (Self-Released, 2016)
