= Julian Moser =

German cinematographer

Julian Moser (born 1987) is a German cinematographer, photographer, and film producer who specializes in documentaries and music videos. He lives in Berlin.

== Biography ==
Julian Moser grew up near Würzburg and lives in Berlin. He started his career as an assistant for the literary magazine Druckfrisch on ARD, worked with Bad Banks writer Oliver Kienle, CNN's short documentary platform Great Big Story, ZDF and Arte.

As director of photography he has collaborated with musicians such as Moritz von Oswald, Tangerine Dream, Nine Inch Nails member Alessandro Cortini, Hainbach, and singer Emel Mathlouthi.

In 2017 he and his brother Felix Moser founded Moserfilm. Their music videos and documentaries were awarded and selected to Ars Electronica Festival, Boddinale, Portland Unknown Film Festival, and the Backup Festival Weimar.

His documentary feature The One Who Runs Away Is The Ghost was selected to the International Competition at International Documentary Festival Amsterdam 2021. Before that, the project won the Grenzgänger fellowship from Robert Bosch Stiftung 2018 and Docs in Progress at Visions du Réel Film Festival 2020.
