= Hainbach (musician) =

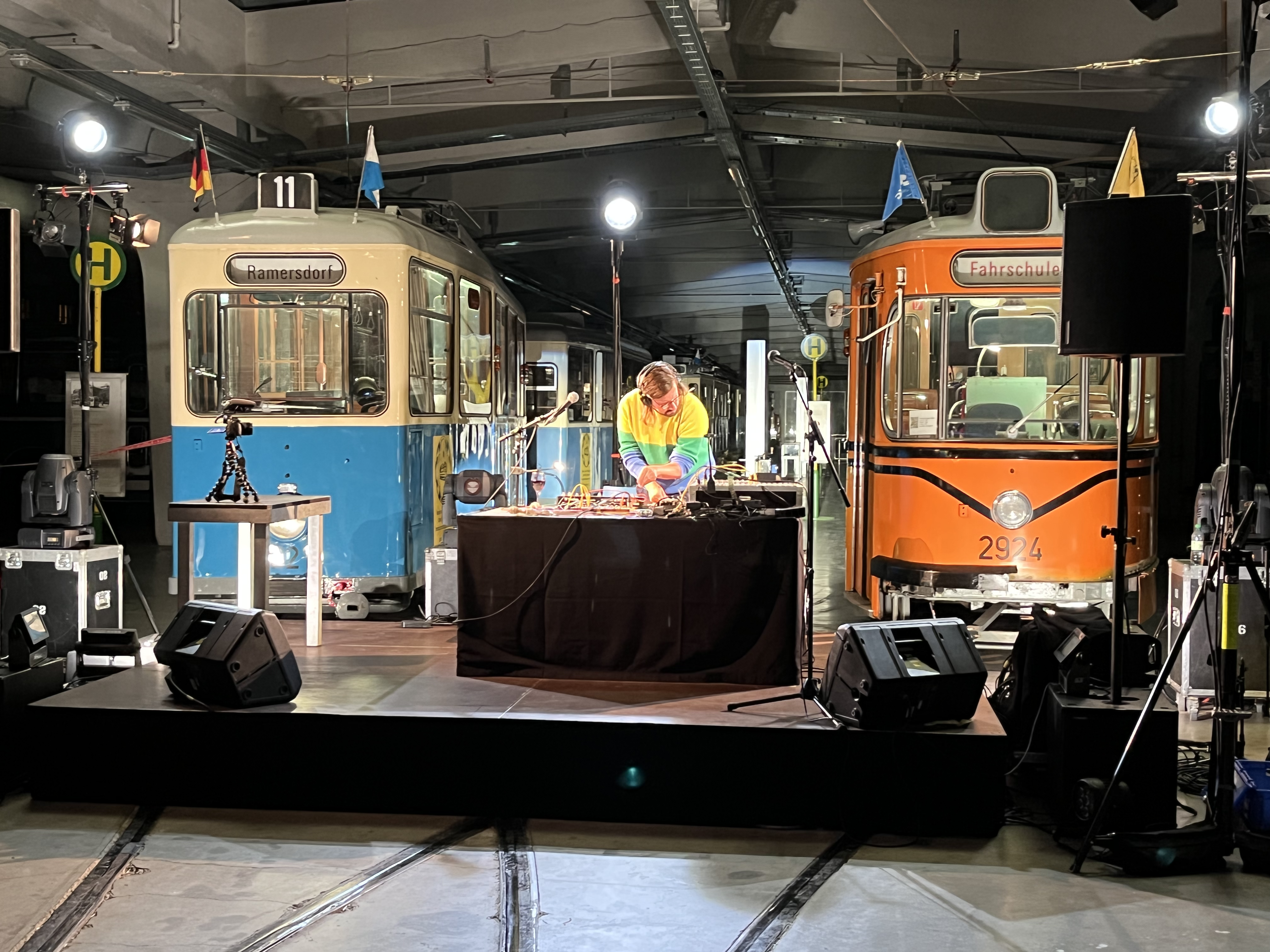
- Hainbach performing live at MVG Museum in Munich September 17th 2022

Background information
- Born: Stefan Paul Goetsch; 1978 (age 47–48); Freiburg im Breisgau, Germany
- Genres: Experimental electronic
- Occupations: Music composer; YouTuber
- Years active: 2010–present
- Labels: Opal; Lavender Sweep; Chase Bliss; Soil; Ultraviolet Light; Misc.; Springbreak; SA; Gohan; Marionette; Seil; Limited Interest
- Member of: Uncompressed
- Formerly of: The Dance Inc.
- Website: Official website

Stefan Paul Goetsch (born 1978), best known by the alias Hainbach, is a German YouTuber and experimental electronic music composer, based in Berlin. He is known for his YouTube channel launched in 2011. His channel displays his ambient recordings and experimental music techniques. Pitchfork described Hainbach's channel as "a treasure trove of clips with titles like 'How to Make Music With a Vintage Piano Tuner' and 'Playing Live With Nuclear Instruments and Unknown Synths'."

== Biography ==
Stefan Paul Goetsch was born in Freiburg im Breisgau, and grew up in Denzlingen at the edge of the Black Forest. He started playing piano at the age of six. As a teenager he was programming his own computer games and played bass in a school band. Goetsch studied in Hamburg and now lives in Berlin with his family. Together with Andre Frahm and Jan Elbeshausen, he played in the new wave style band The Dance Inc. until they split up in 2009. The band released all of their songs on the Hamburg based label Audiolith Records.

Under his alias Hainbach, he uses experimental music techniques with tape loops and nuclear test equipment. The British music magazine The Wire called his music "One hell of a trip".

Stefan Paul Goetsch started making music as Hainbach in 2010. Since then he has released albums on Opal Tapes, Lavender Sweep Records, Chase Bliss, Soil, Ultraviolet Light, Misc., Springbreak Tapes, SA Recordings, Gohan Tapes, Marionette, Seil Records and Alessandro Cortini's Limited Interest label. The music websites Bandcamp Daily and The Quietus praised his 2018 album The Evening Hopefuls and named Hainbach as one of "Ten Musicians Updating Electroacoustic Music for the 21st Century".

He named Béla Bartók, 1980s video game scores, Francis Bebey and Karlheinz Stockhausen as inspirations.

In May 2022, he joined with YouTubers Cuckoo and Sam Battle of Look Mum No Computer to form a musical supergroup called Uncompressed.

== Scoring work ==
Stefan Paul Goetsch worked on more than 70 theatre plays as a composer, lyricist and live musician. Amongst those are the Staatstheater Hannover, Schauspielhaus Hamburg, Theater Frankfurt, Theater Bonn and Deutsches Nationaltheater und Staatskapelle Weimar.

Hainbach wrote the music for Alexey Demidov's iOS game BrainConnect in 2016.

In 2017 he composed the score to the short-documentary Bruderkrieg (English title: War of Brothers) by Felix Moser and Julian Moser. The two brothers have collaborated with Hainbach on several music videos including the visual album to Light Splitting, which premiered on Fact Magazine and was selected to Ars Electronica Festival in 2020. Hainbach scored the 2021 feature documentary Billions of Windows about the life of Stephen Wiltshire, directed by Sergey Stefanovich. He wrote the soundtrack for the 2021 feature documentary The One Who Runs Away Is the Ghost, directed by Qinyuan Lei. This is the second soundtrack collaboration with Moserfilm.

In April 2021, Hainbach created sounds for AVAR, an augmented reality app by the Estonian artist Taavi Varm, in collaboration with the Goethe Institut in Tallinn.

== Live performances ==
Hainbach performed at venues like Kantine am Berghain in Berlin, Uebel & Gefährlich in Hamburg, Blå in Oslo. Together with visual artist Nani Gutiérrez alias Orca, they have played festivals such as Die Digitale Düsseldorf and Up to Date Festival in Białystok. His live performance concept Schlaufenzeit premiered at the 2021 Impuls Festival in Halle. It is based around German 1950s test equipment and a Hohner Electronium tube synthesizer.

== Sound installations ==
The sound installation Landfill Totems is a playable set of sound sculptures put together from obsolete medical and nuclear test equipment. It premiered at PDNT Gallery Berlin in November 2019 and was later shown at Patch Point in Berlin-Kreuzberg. The installation sound was also released as a full album and an accompanying sound library, with contributions by the composers KMRU and Eric D. Clark. In October 2021 Hainbach's installation Destruction Loops was presented at the Impuls Festival in Halle. The festival had been defamed and attacked by the AfD, CDU politicians and other right-wing groups for years. In a room-filling sound installation, collages of the worst comments, attacks and excerpts from the official AfD election program were slowly destroyed on self-destructing audio tape loops. The performance lasted 48 hours.

== Virtual instruments and audio plug-ins ==
Hainbach created several virtual instruments and audio plug-ins. Fundamental, his app in collaboration with SonicLab, is a sound synthesis plugin, based on the workflow of electronic studios of the past.

In 2020, Hainbach teamed up with plugin creators AudioThing to release Wires, a Soviet wire recorder used by the East German military turned into a plugin. Things – Motor is a morphing rotor effect inspired by The Crystal Palace from the BBC Radiophonic Workshop. The original sound by Brian Hodgson and Delia Derbyshire can be heard on the soundtrack to the Doctor Who episode "The Krotons". Landfill Totems, a virtual instrument in collaboration with Spitfire Audio, was made of high-end medical, telecommunication and scientific research equipment. Moon Echo recreates the effect of Earth–Moon–Earth communication or "moonbounce".

== Discography ==
=== Albums ===
- As Sparks Fly Upward (2012)
- The Heat (2014)
- Ashes (2015)
- Shrines (2016)
- No Need for Rain (2017)
- Cello Pattern (2017)
- Violin Forms (2017)
- Alive Evil (2018)
- The Evening Hopefuls (2018)
- Codex (2018)
- Songs for Coco (2018)
- Ambient Piano Works (2018)
- Senses (2018)
- Old Suns (2019)
- Gestures (2019)
- Assertion (2020)
- Light Splitting (2020)
- Schwebungssummer (2021)
- Landfill Totems (2021)
- Home Stories (2021)

=== Soundtrack albums ===
- Bruderkrieg (2017)
- Billions of Windows (2021)
- The One Who Runs Away Is the Ghost (tba)

=== Extended plays ===
- A Ritual (2014)
- Rhein (2016)
- Only the Rain Never Tires (2017)
- Dear Earth (2018)
- Impulsgenerator (2019)
- The Earth's Own Sighs (2020)
- Gaze Up at the Harvest Moon (2020)

=== Collaborations and remixes ===
- Acosta, EP (2017, with Kilchhofer)
- Bad Stream – "Transition", single (Hainbach rework)
- Hainbach / Todd Barton, EP (2019, with Todd Barton)
- Borrowed Water, album (2019, with My Panda Shall Fly)
- Hainbach / Morfbeats, album (2020, with Morfbeats)
- George Hurd & Hurd Ensemble - "Tethering Blind" / "All Falling Apart", single (2020, Hainbach Remix)
- "Jaybird", single (2020, with Bad Stream)
- "Wouter van Veldhoven – Wanderlied", single (Hainbach Rework) (2021)
