= United Kingdom in the Eurovision Song Contest 2026 =

- Eurovision Song Contest 2026
- Participating broadcaster: British Broadcasting Corporation (BBC)
- Country: United Kingdom
- Selection process: Internal selection
- Announcement date: Artist: 17 February 2026; Song: 6 March 2026

Competing entry
- Song: "Eins, Zwei, Drei"
- Artist: Look Mum No Computer
- Songwriters: Sam Battle; Thomas Stengaard; Lasse Midtsian Nymann; Julie Aagaard

Placement
- Final result: 25th, 1 point

Participation chronology

The United Kingdom was represented at the Eurovision Song Contest 2026 with the song "Eins, Zwei, Drei", written by Sam Bartle, Thomas Stengaard, Lasse Midtsian Nymann, and Julie Aagaard, and performed by Bartle under his stage name Look Mum No Computer. The British participating broadcaster, the British Broadcasting Corporation (BBC), internally selected its entry for the contest.

As a member of the "Big Four", the United Kingdom automatically qualified to compete in the final of the Eurovision Song Contest. Performing in position 14, the United Kingdom placed last out of the 25 performing countries with one point, marking the country's worst result since 2021.

== Background ==
Prior to the 2026 contest, the British Broadcasting Corporation (BBC) has participated in the Eurovision Song Contest representing the United Kingdom sixty-seven times since its first entry in 1957. Thus far, it has won the contest five times: in 1967 with the song "Puppet on a String" performed by Sandie Shaw, in 1969 with the song "Boom Bang-a-Bang" performed by Lulu, in 1976 with "Save Your Kisses for Me" performed by Brotherhood of Man, in 1981 with the song "Making Your Mind Up" performed by Bucks Fizz and in 1997 with the song "Love Shine a Light" performed by Katrina and the Waves. After its last win, it has failed to be consistently successful, only reaching the top ten four times: in 1998, 2002, 2009, and 2022; and ending last five times: in 2003 (the first time in the country's history in the contest), 2008, 2010, 2019, and 2021. In 2025, "What the Hell Just Happened?" by Remember Monday finished in 19th place. The United Kingdom is the country that has hosted the contest the most times, with nine in total (in 1960, 1963, 1968, 1972, 1974, 1977, 1982, 1998, and 2023).

As part of its duties as participating broadcaster, the BBC organises the selection of its entry in the Eurovision Song Contest and broadcasts the event in the country. The broadcaster has used various methods to select its entry: From 1957 to 2010, it organised a national final which featured a competition among several artists and songs to choose its entry for the contest. Between 2011 and 2015, the BBC opted to internally select its entry. For its 2016 entry, the broadcaster announced that a national final would be organised again. The same process was used in 2017 and 2018, and changes were brought in for 2019. From 2020, the BBC opted to return to an internal selection.

== Before Eurovision ==
=== Internal selection ===
The BBC internally selected its entry for the 2026 contest. On 30 October 2025, it was announced that Andrew Cartmell and David May would lead the search to find an act to represent the country in 2026. On 17 February 2026, the BBC announced that Look Mum No Computer would represent the country. On 2 March 2026, it was announced on The Scott Mills Breakfast Show that the title of the competing song by Look Mum No Computer was "Eins, Zwei, Drei", and it would receive its first play on 6 March 2026 on the same show.

== At Eurovision ==
The Eurovision Song Contest 2026 took place at the Wiener Stadthalle in Vienna, Austria, and consisted of two semi-finals held on the respective dates of 12 and 14 May and the final on 16 May 2026. All nations with the exceptions of the host country and the "Big Four" (France, Germany, Italy, and the United Kingdom) were required to qualify from one of two semi-finals in order to compete in the final; the top ten countries from each semi-final progressed to the final. As a member of the "Big Four", the United Kingdom automatically qualified to compete in the final on 16 May 2026, but was also required to broadcast and vote in one of the two semi-finals. This was decided via a draw held during the semi-final allocation draw on 12 January 2026, when it was announced that the United Kingdom would be voting in the second semi-final. Despite being an automatic qualifier for the final, the British entry was also performed during the semi-final.

=== Voting ===
==== Points awarded to the United Kingdom ====
The United Kingdom received one point from the Ukrainian jury in the final.

==== Points awarded by the United Kingdom ====
Points awarded by the United Kingdom (Semi-final 2)
| Score | Televote | Jury |
|---|---|---|
| 12 points | Bulgaria | Norway |
| 10 points | Romania | Denmark |
| 8 points | Cyprus | Czech Republic |
| 7 points | Australia | Australia |
| 6 points | Norway | Ukraine |
| 5 points | Latvia | Bulgaria |
| 4 points | Ukraine | Romania |
| 3 points | Albania | Latvia |
| 2 points | Malta | Armenia |
| 1 point | Luxembourg | Malta |

Points awarded by the United Kingdom (Final)
| Score | Televote | Jury |
|---|---|---|
| 12 points | Bulgaria | France |
| 10 points | Israel | Bulgaria |
| 8 points | Romania | Czech Republic |
| 7 points | Australia | Ukraine |
| 6 points | Moldova | Denmark |
| 5 points | Poland | Poland |
| 4 points | Greece | Norway |
| 3 points | Cyprus | Australia |
| 2 points | Ukraine | Finland |
| 1 point | Finland | Malta |

==== Detailed voting results ====
Each participating broadcaster assembles a seven-member jury panel consisting of music industry professionals who are citizens of the country they represent and two of which have to be between 18 and 25 years old. Each jury, and individual jury member, is required to meet a strict set of criteria regarding professional background, as well as diversity in gender and age. No member of a national jury was permitted to be related in any way to any of the competing acts in such a way that they cannot vote impartially and independently. The individual rankings of each jury member as well as the nation's televoting results were released shortly after the grand final.

The following members comprised the British jury:

- Harry Ryan Hornsby
- Joseph David Duddell
- Nathan Othniel Powell
- Anuoluwapo Iyanu Omideyi
- Eva Christina Petersen
- Riya Na Kalhan
- Tilly Summer Lockey

Detailed voting results from United Kingdom (Semi-final 2)
| R/O | Country | Jury | | | | | | | | | Televote | |
| R/O | Country | Juror A | Juror B | Juror C | Juror D | Juror E | Juror F | Juror G | Rank | Points | Rank | Points |
|---|---|---|---|---|---|---|---|---|---|---|---|---|
| 01 | Bulgaria | 11 | 1 | 6 | 8 | 8 | 4 | 3 | 6 | 5 | 1 | 12 |
| 02 | Azerbaijan | 4 | 8 | 14 | 14 | 15 | 15 | 15 | 13 | | 15 | |
| 03 | Romania | 15 | 7 | 7 | 12 | 3 | 9 | 4 | 7 | 4 | 2 | 10 |
| 04 | Luxembourg | 14 | 15 | 11 | 15 | 9 | 11 | 13 | 15 | | 10 | 1 |
| 05 | Czechia | 1 | 4 | 9 | 1 | 1 | 12 | 6 | 3 | 8 | 13 | |
| 06 | Armenia | 10 | 5 | 13 | 10 | 7 | 6 | 9 | 9 | 2 | 14 | |
| 07 | Switzerland | 5 | 13 | 10 | 11 | 11 | 10 | 10 | 12 | | 12 | |
| 08 | Cyprus | 9 | 6 | 12 | 9 | 14 | 14 | 14 | 14 | | 3 | 8 |
| 09 | Latvia | 3 | 12 | 4 | 5 | 10 | 13 | 11 | 8 | 3 | 6 | 5 |
| 10 | Denmark | 12 | 3 | 1 | 3 | 6 | 5 | 1 | 2 | 10 | 11 | |
| 11 | Australia | 2 | 11 | 2 | 4 | 4 | 3 | 7 | 4 | 7 | 4 | 7 |
| 12 | Ukraine | 6 | 9 | 3 | 2 | 5 | 7 | 5 | 5 | 6 | 7 | 4 |
| 13 | Albania | 8 | 10 | 15 | 7 | 12 | 8 | 8 | 11 | | 8 | 3 |
| 14 | Malta | 13 | 14 | 8 | 13 | 13 | 1 | 12 | 10 | 1 | 9 | 2 |
| 15 | Norway | 7 | 2 | 5 | 6 | 2 | 2 | 2 | 1 | 12 | 5 | 6 |

Detailed voting results from United Kingdom (Final)
| R/O | Country | Jury | | | | | | | | | Televote | |
| R/O | Country | Juror A | Juror B | Juror C | Juror D | Juror E | Juror F | Juror G | Rank | Points | Rank | Points |
|---|---|---|---|---|---|---|---|---|---|---|---|---|
| 01 | Denmark | 2 | 2 | 8 | 12 | 16 | 1 | 15 | 5 | 6 | 19 | |
| 02 | Germany | 18 | 24 | 18 | 23 | 14 | 24 | 23 | 24 | | 22 | |
| 03 | Israel | 23 | 23 | 19 | 13 | 9 | 10 | 4 | 12 | | 2 | 10 |
| 04 | Belgium | 9 | 22 | 15 | 22 | 10 | 23 | 21 | 19 | | 23 | |
| 05 | Albania | 20 | 13 | 22 | 16 | 13 | 3 | 14 | 14 | | 12 | |
| 06 | Greece | 19 | 14 | 21 | 15 | 15 | 19 | 16 | 21 | | 7 | 4 |
| 07 | Ukraine | 3 | 11 | 3 | 5 | 5 | 4 | 10 | 4 | 7 | 9 | 2 |
| 08 | Australia | 10 | 12 | 9 | 6 | 4 | 5 | 6 | 8 | 3 | 4 | 7 |
| 09 | Serbia | 21 | 19 | 24 | 18 | 23 | 20 | 11 | 23 | | 20 | |
| 10 | Malta | 11 | 20 | 16 | 20 | 11 | 14 | 2 | 10 | 1 | 16 | |
| 11 | Czechia | 4 | 5 | 6 | 2 | 3 | 2 | 8 | 3 | 8 | 21 | |
| 12 | Bulgaria | 1 | 1 | 4 | 3 | 12 | 7 | 3 | 2 | 10 | 1 | 12 |
| 13 | Croatia | 12 | 10 | 10 | 7 | 21 | 9 | 18 | 13 | | 18 | |
| 14 | United Kingdom | | | | | | | | | | | |
| 15 | France | 5 | 4 | 1 | 4 | 1 | 6 | 1 | 1 | 12 | 17 | |
| 16 | Moldova | 13 | 9 | 20 | 10 | 19 | 13 | 24 | 17 | | 5 | 6 |
| 17 | Finland | 14 | 15 | 11 | 1 | 17 | 16 | 20 | 9 | 2 | 10 | 1 |
| 18 | Poland | 6 | 7 | 2 | 14 | 2 | 8 | 9 | 6 | 5 | 6 | 5 |
| 19 | Lithuania | 15 | 17 | 5 | 19 | 22 | 22 | 19 | 16 | | 11 | |
| 20 | Sweden | 22 | 18 | 14 | 21 | 18 | 21 | 13 | 22 | | 15 | |
| 21 | Cyprus | 7 | 8 | 13 | 17 | 7 | 12 | 12 | 11 | | 8 | 3 |
| 22 | Italy | 16 | 16 | 23 | 24 | 20 | 17 | 7 | 20 | | 13 | |
| 23 | Norway | 8 | 3 | 7 | 9 | 6 | 11 | 5 | 7 | 4 | 14 | |
| 24 | Romania | 24 | 6 | 12 | 8 | 24 | 18 | 17 | 15 | | 3 | 8 |
| 25 | Austria | 17 | 21 | 17 | 11 | 8 | 15 | 22 | 18 | | 24 | |
