= Look Mum No Computer =

English musician and YouTuber

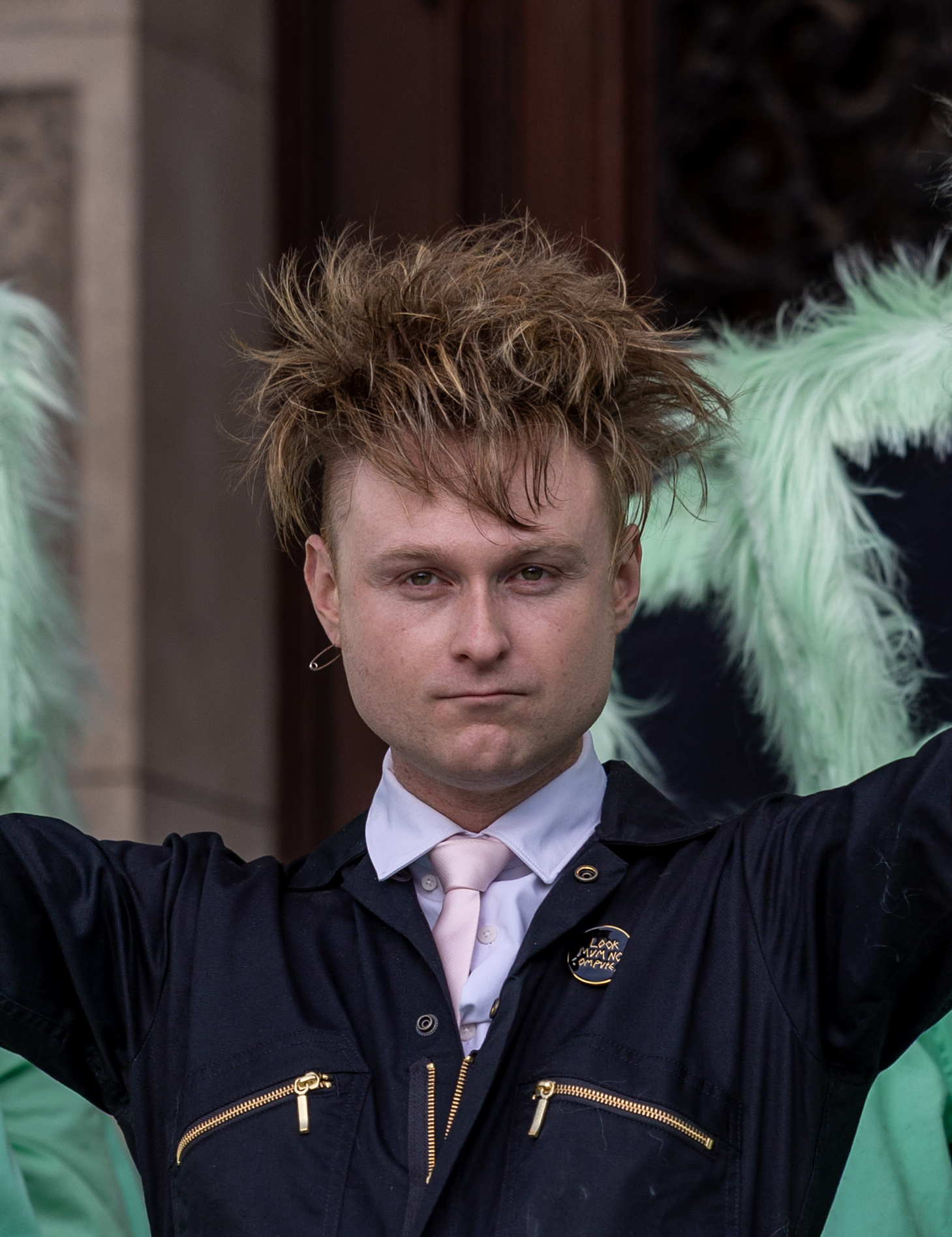
- Battle in 2026

Background information
- Born: Sam James Bartle; 3 February 1989 (age 37); Grantham, Lincolnshire, England
- Genres: Indie; alternative; electronic
- Years active: 2016–present
- Formerly of: Zibra
- Website: lookmumnocomputer.com

Sam James Bartle (born 3 February 1989), known by the stage names Sam Battle and Look Mum No Computer, is an English musician, YouTuber, electronics enthusiast, and composer. He posts videos about making pro audio equipment and synthesisers, as well as original music.

Bartle builds unusual and eccentric electronic musical devices made from vintage technology, such devices as a Furby organ, a synthesiser fused with a classic Raleigh Chopper bicycle, and a Game Boy Triple Oscillator synthesiser. Battle runs This Museum Is (Not) Obsolete, a museum in Ramsgate, Kent, which showcases vintage analogue devices repurposed for humorous uses. He represented the United Kingdom in the Eurovision Song Contest 2026 with the song "Eins, Zwei, Drei" and finished in last place with 1 point.

== Early life and education ==
Sam James Bartle was born on 3 February 1989 in Grantham, Lincolnshire, to parents Jane and Alan Bartle. He grew up in Yaxley, near Peterborough, and has a younger sister, Jodie, a professional footballer who also appeared as one of the "Kosmo" furry characters that appear in the music video for his Eurovision song "Eins, Zwei, Drei". Battle spent much of his childhood indoors experimenting with building projects, such as rockets and robots inspired by the television show Robot Wars. From an early age, Battle showed a strong curiosity for mechanics, frequently dismantling toys, household appliances like irons and toasters, and pedal cars to explore their inner workings. His grandparents were trustees of a lighthouse museum and when he was younger he enjoyed visiting the museum after hours.

When he was 16 he attempted to build an electronic guitar pedal and while still in secondary school he also attempted to make a synthesiser as well as attempting to fuse an acoustic guitar with a piano.

Around 2011, Battle went to university to study chemistry, but switched to a music technology course in the same year. He left in the middle of the course to join a band in London, where he stayed for three years. The band signed a record deal and recorded an album that was not released, and Battle learnt electronics during this time, and started creating his own electronic musical instruments again. Battle taught himself how to build the electronic musical instruments he plays.

Prior to beginning the indie-rock band ZIBRA, Battle worked in a number of jobs including fixing synths, fixing bicycles at Halfords and at one point he was a chef. Battle has further commented that when he first began performing music "I started off playing guitar mainly, and then through doing electronics and stuff I began making money by fixing synthesisers and through that we ended up using the synths, liking it and then eventually recording it. Also because my computer wasn’t very good I used the synths instead of using plug-ins, which is not what a lot of artists do. I kind of liked having that different approach of slicing and dicing things up because the computer was too latent to record. When we ended up with the sound we got we were quite happy".

== Career ==
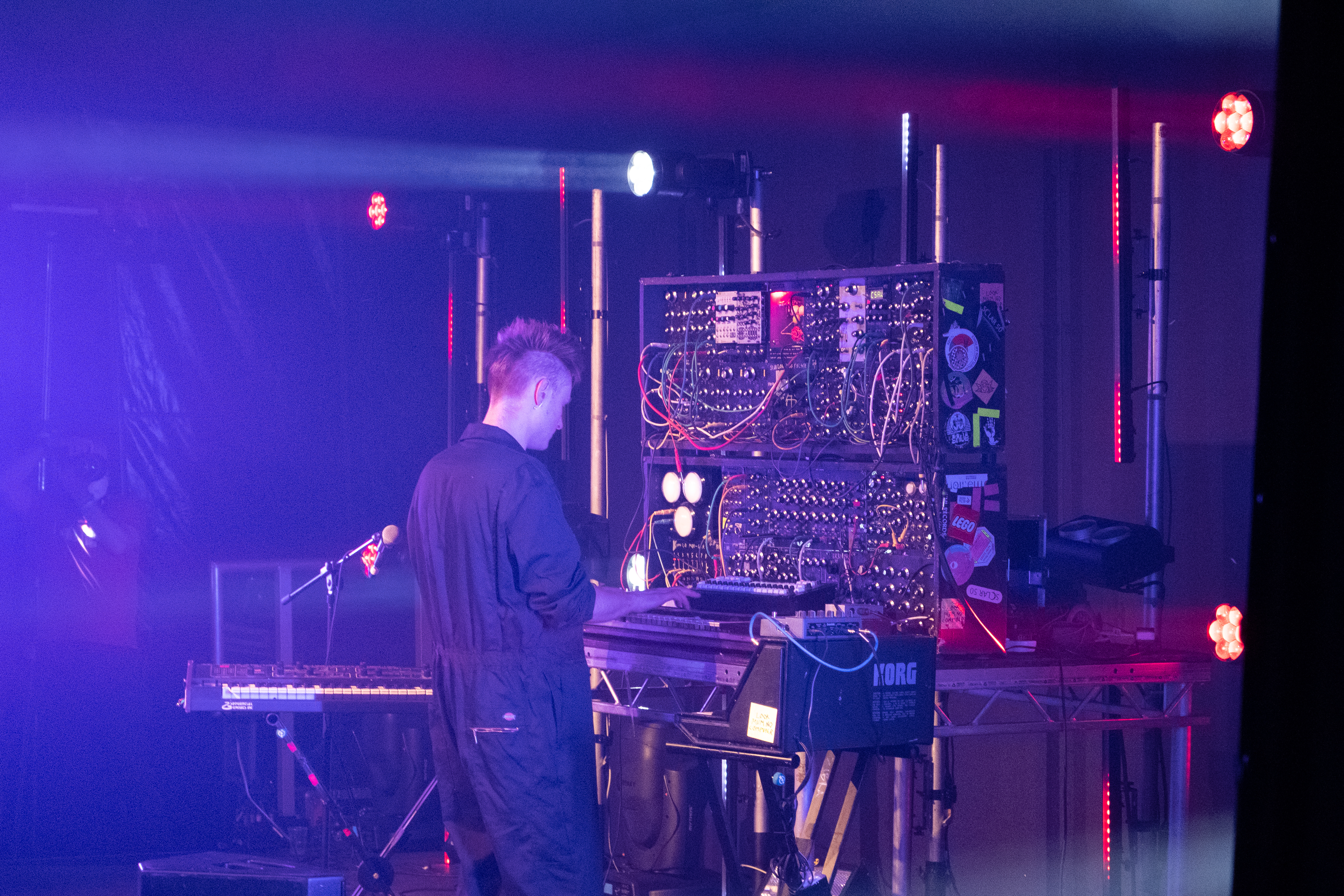
Look Mum No Computer performing with his "Kosmo" modular synthesiser at the Electromagnetic Field festival at Eastnor Castle Deer Park, Herefordshire, UK in 2022.

In 2013, Battle launched his YouTube channel, adopting the name Sam Battle, and began posting content for Zibra, a band that he had created with three friends. Battle was the lead vocalist and they performed at the Glastonbury Festival in 2015 as the final act on the BBC Introducing stage, as well as at the Field Day festival in London and they also performed as a support act on tour with Years & Years.

Initially music was the sole focus of his career; over time, it began to change to making videos for YouTube.

Zibra disbanded in 2016 and since then the YouTube channel has posted content related to Battle's solo music project. His first music gear related video was posted in 2016. Besides advertising income from YouTube, Battle has also been funding his electronic inventions (such as an organ made of flame throwers) with fan donations, on the subscription platform Patreon.

In 2011 he first came up with the concept for a Furby synthesiser he calls the "Furby organ" and it was completed in 2018 using 44 Furbies. In relation to the Furby organ Battle has commented that it is like "a Furby... that is able to gutturally sing as well as make its own circuit bent sounds... ...so this in essence is a truly polyphonic Furby formant synthesiser, it's kind of like a Polymoog but instead of Moog stuff, it's a Furby".

In 2022, Battle began restoring a 1914 church organ, as an exhibit in This Museum Is (Not) Obsolete, the process of which has been documented on his YouTube channel. Battle also produces and sells modular synthesiser components, such as the #1222 Performance VCO.

He released his first single, "Groundhog Day", in 2019 and later that year, he toured Germany, Switzerland and the UK. In May 2022, he joined with Cuckoo and Hainbach to form a musical supergroup called Uncompressed who performed together for the first time at Barcelona's Sónar festival in June 2019.

Battle has co-produced several compositions for screening, such as "Satellite Moments (Light Up the Sky)" (with Charlie Fink) for the film adaptation of A Street Cat Named Bob, as well as "Glitter and Gold" (with Barns Courtney) for Netflix's series Safe.

As well as music he present a travel docu-series series called Junk Rock TV where he travelled around Europe making musical instruments and performing alongside Hainbach, Pedro Javier Gonzalez, Lydia Kavina, and Fedde ten Berge.

In March 2025, he announced a video game called Look Mum No Computer, developed in collaboration with the German indie studio The Bitfather and publisher Headup Games. The game was released on Steam on 24 July 2025, and for consoles on 22 January 2026. In 2025 the game was nominated for the German Developer Award for Best Audio Design.

In February 2026, it was announced that Battle had been selected as the artist to represent the United Kingdom at Eurovision Song Contest 2026. His song, "Eins, Zwei, Drei", was released on 6 March and solely uses his "Kosmo" modular synthesiser. As of May 2026, his YouTube channel has over 91 million views.

== Museum ==
Battle runs a permanent exhibition in Ramsgate, Kent, housing a collection of vintage electronics, synthesisers, and experimental musical instruments. Named "This Museum Is (Not) Obsolete", it opened in August 2021 and features items from his personal builds alongside donated historical pieces, emphasising hands-on interaction with obsolete technology. It attracts visitors interested in tinkering with early electronic devices, such as modified tape delays and modular oscillators.

== Kosmo ==
Battle typically uses modular synthesisers in his compositions. He created Kosmo, a format for DIY-focused modular synthesizers. They feature 20-centimetre-long (7.9 in) panels and are an alternative to Eurorack that is designed specifically for DIY construction and live performance. The format is designed to be cost-effective, allowing the use of stripboard circuits and 3D-printed panels, with many designs open-sourced by the community.

== Personal life ==
Battle's first child, a son called Max, was born in April 2026.

== Discography ==
=== As Look Mum No Computer ===
==== Singles ====
- "Groundhog Day" – 2019
- "Modern Gas" – 2019
- "Shock Horror" – 2020
- "Desperado Vespa" – 2020
- "Daydreamer" – 2020
- "Stand and Deliver" – 2020
- "Youth8500" – 2021
- "Stupid Me" – 2021
- "Ride" – 2021
- "Mind Over Matter" – 2021
- "We'll Find a Way" – 2022
- "Time Is Not a Healer It's a Fuel for Resentment" – 2022
- "Handbook on How to Stay Alive" – 2023
- "Night or Day" – 2023
- "T.I.M" – 2023
- "Too Many Mistakes" – 2024
- "No Hope Eternal" – 2025
- "Eins, Zwei, Drei" – 2026

===== feat. Hainbach =====
- "Bordsteinkante" – 2024
- "Rotopops" – 2024 (EP)
- "Ghosts" – 2024

==== Albums and EPs ====
- "Human Procrastination" – 2019 (EP)
- "These Songs Are Obsolete" – 2020
- "Look Mum No Bootleg PT. I" – 2022
- "Look Mum No Bootleg PT. II" – 2022
- "Kosmo Plays Vivaldi" – 2023 (EP)
- "Kosmo Comes for Christmas" – 2023
- "Pipe Dreams" – 2024 (EP)
- "PortaKosmo Vol 1 at the Length" – 2024 (EP)
- "Double Barelled Decadence" – 2024
- "The VCS4 Collection" – 2025
- "Portakosmo 2.0" – 2025
- "Godwin Band in a Box" – 2025
- "Hungry Vultures" – 2025

Awards and achievements
Preceded by Remember Monday with "What the Hell Just Happened?"	United Kingdom in the Eurovision Song Contest; 2026	Succeeded by TBD
