= Brian Baines =

British newsreader and announcer

- Born: Herbert Brian Baines; 23 May 1931; Bradford, Yorkshire, England
- Died: 30 June 2006 (aged 75); Bradford, West Riding of Yorkshire, England
- Occupations: Newsreader, character actor

Herbert Brian Baines (23 May 1931 – 30 June 2006) was an English television newsreader, continuity announcer and character actor.

Born in Bradford, West Riding of Yorkshire, he attended Grange Grammar School before trying to make his living as an actor. After struggling to find success, he returned to school at Bretton Hall College to become a teacher. On the weekends, however, he worked freelance jobs for the BBC in Manchester, becoming full-time in 1970 when the position was made permanent.

As well as regular newsreading duties on the early evening Look North programme, Baines was also one of the main announcers for BBC North television during the 1970s and early 1980s when the BBC's English regions utilised local continuity during peak time.

He continued to provide continuity for regional programming and read short Look North bulletins until April 1988.

He also appeared as a character actor in supporting roles for several TV dramas filmed in the north of England.

Baines died in a Bradford hospice in 2006, at the age of 75.

After he died, colleagues revealed that he frequently read the late night TV news and weather out of vision, sitting motionless so that his motorcycling leathers would not creak, as he was dressed ready for the journey home.
