= List of Cliff Richard television appearances =

This is a list of UK television series and specials starring the singer Cliff Richard broadcast on BBC Television.

== BBC TV series and specials ==
=== The Cliff Richard Show ===
No. overall	No. in series	Title	Directed by	Written by	Original release date
1	1	"The Cliff Richard Show"	Neville Wortman	Allan Scott	28 April 1963 at 7:25pm on BBCtv
Special guests: The Shadows, Millicent Martin, Daly & Wayne and Sid James with Harry Rabinowitz and his Orchestra.
2	-	"Show Of The week"	Mel Cornish	Unknown	5 April 1966 at 9:00pm on BBC2
Produced by Stewart Morris. Guests: The Shadows and Norrie Paramour and his Orchestra.
3	-	"Cliff Richard at the Talk Of The Town"	John Street	Unknown	28 June 1968 at 9:05pm on BBC2
Produced by Stewart Morris. Guests: The Shadows and Norrie Paramour and his Orchestra.
4	2	"The Cliff Richard Show"	Michael Hurll	Eric Davidson	17 May 1969 at 7:30pm on BBC1
Special guests: Cilla Black, Una Stubbs, Hank B. Marvin and Sheila White. Vocal backing: The Breakaways with Norrie Paramour and his Orchestra.

=== It's Cliff Richard: Series 1 ===
Produced by Michael Hurll. Broadcast Saturdays on BBC1 at 6:15 pm. Regular series guests: Una Stubbs and Hank B. Marvin with The Breakaways (vocal backing) and Norrie Paramour and his orchestra (musical backing).

No. overall	No. in series	Title	Directed by	Written by	Original release date
4	1	"Episode 1"	Michael Hurll	Eric Davidson	3 January 1970
Guest: Cheryl Kennedy.
5	2	"Episode 2"	Michael Hurll	Eric Davidson	10 January 1970
Guest: Daliah Lavi.
6	3	"Episode 3"	Michael Hurll	Eric Davidson	17 January 1970
Guest: Judith Durham.
7	4	"Episode 4"	Michael Hurll	Eric Davidson	24 January 1970
Guest: Mary Hopkin performing song 1 of 6 in A Song for Europe 1970.
8	5	"Episode 5"	Michael Hurll	Eric Davidson	31 January 1970
Guests: Cheryl Kennedy and Mary Hopkin performing song 2 of 6 in A Song for Europe 1970.
9	6	"Episode 6"	Michael Hurll	Eric Davidson	7 February 1970
Guests: John Rowles and Mary Hopkin performing song 3 of 6 in A Song for Europe 1970.
10	7	"Episode 7"	Michael Hurll	Eric Davidson	14 February 1970
Guests:Daliah Lavi and Mary Hopkin singing song 4 of 6 in A Song for Europe 1970.
11	8	"Episode 8"	Michael Hurll	Eric Davidson	21 February 1970
Guests: Cheryl Kennedy and The Settlers, with Mary Hopkin performing song 5 of 6 in A Song for Europe 1970.
12	9	"Episode 9"	Michael Hurll	Eric Davidson	28 February 1970
Guests: Sheila White and Mary Hopkin singing song 6 of 6 in A Song for Europe 1970.
13	10	"A Song for Europe 1970"	Michael Hurll	Eric Davidson	7 March 1970
Special edition: A Song for Europe 1970. Mary Hopkin sings all six Songs for Europe.
14	11	"Episode 11"	Michael Hurll	Eric Davidson	14 March 1970
Result of A Song for Europe 1970.
15	12	"Episode 12"	Michael Hurll	Eric Davidson	21 March 1970
No additional guest information.
16	13	"Episode 13"	Michael Hurll	Eric Davidson	28 March 1970
Guest: Cilla Black.

=== Sing a New Song ===
One Series. Produced by Raymond Short. Broadcast Sundays on BBC1 at 6:00 pm. Series guests: The Settlers.

No. overall	No. in series	Title	Directed by	Original release date
1	1	"Episode 1"	Philip S. Gilbert	7 June 1970
Guests: Singers from Manchester led by Michael Baughen.
2	2	"Episode 2"	Philip S. Gilbert	14 June 1970
Guests: Judith Durham Sydney Carter and The Spinners.
3	3	"Episode 3"	Philip S. Gilbert	4 October 1970
Guests: The MGS Christian Music Group and The Cheadle Hulme School Choir.
4	4	"Episode 4"	Philip S. Gilbert	1 November 1970
Guests: Roy Castle.
5	5	"Episode 5"	Philip S. Gilbert	6 December 1970
Guests: Solomon King & The Kingsmen and The Burnley High School.

=== Specials ===
No. overall	No. in series	Title	Directed by	Written by	Original release date
17	3	"The Cliff Richard Show"	Michael Hurll	Eric Davidson	31 August 1970 at 8:00pm on BBC1
Bank Holiday Special. Guests: Una Stubbs, Hank Marvin and Aretha Franklin.
18	-	"Cliff In Scandinavia"	Michael Hurll	Eric Davidson	1 October 1970 at 8:15pm on BBC1
Special filmed in Sweden, Norway and Finland. Guests: Una Stubbs, Hank Marvin, Cia Löwgren, Anne-Lise Gjostol, Pirjo Viitanen and The Christians.

=== It's Cliff Richard: Series 2 ===
Produced by Michael Hurll. Broadcast Saturdays on BBC1 at 6:15 pm (except where noted). Series guests: The Breakaways (vocal backing) and Norrie Parmour & His Orchestra (musical backing)

No. overall	No. in series	Title	Directed by	Written by	Original release date
19	4	"The Cliff Richard Show"	Michael Hurll	Eric Davidson	24 December 1970
Christmas Eve Special. Guests: Una Stubbs, Hank Marvin, Olivia Newton-John and Marvin, Welch & Farrar.
20	1	"Episode 1"	Michael Hurll	Eric Davidson	2 January 1971
Guests: Julie Felix with Una Stubbs and Hank Marvin.
21	2	"Episode 2"	Michael Hurll	Eric Davidson	9 January 1971
Guests: Marvin, Welch & Farrar, Una Stubbs and Clodagh Rodgers singing A Song for Europe 1971 song 1 of 6.
22	3	"Episode 3"	Michael Hurll	Eric Davidson	16 January 1971
Guests: The New Seekers, Una Stubbs, Hank Marvin and Clodagh Rodgers singing A Song for Europe 1971 song 2 of 6.
23	4	"Episode 4"	Brian Whitehouse	Eric Davidson	23 January 1971
Guests: Elton John, Sweet Rain and Clodagh Rodgers singing A Song for Europe 1971 song 3 of 6.
24	5	"Episode 5"	Michael Hurll	Eric Davidson	30 January 1971
Guests: Labi Siffre, Una Stubbs, Hank Marvin and Clodagh Rodgers singing A Song for Europe 1971 song 4 of 6.
25	6	"Episode 6"	Michael Hurll	Eric Davidson	6 February 1971
Guests: Olivia Newton-John, Una Stubbs and Hank Marvin, Bruce Welch, John Farrar and Clodagh Rodgers singing A Song for Europe 1971 song 5 of 6.
26	7	"Episode 7"	Brian Whitehouse	Eric Davidson	13 February 1971
Guests: Roger Whittaker, Una Stubbs, Hank Marvin and Clodagh Rodgers singing A Song for Europe 1971 song 6 of 6.
27	8	"A Song for Europe 1971"	Michael Hurll	Eric Davidson	20 February 1971
A Song for Europe 1971. Clodagh Rodgers performed all six of the potential Eurovision entries.
28	9	"Episode 9"	Michael Hurll	Eric Davidson	27 February 1971
Guests: Petula Clark, Una Stubbs, Hank Marvin and Clodagh Rodgers singing the winning UK entry for Eurovision 1971.
29	10	"Episode 10"	Brian Whitehouse	Eric Davidson	6 March 1971
Guests: Olivia Newton-John and Marvin, Welch & Farrar.
30	11	"Episode 11"	Michael Hurll	Eric Davidson	13 March 1971
Guests: Labi Siffre, Marvin, Welch & Farrar and Una Stubbs.
31	12	"Episode 12"	Brian Whitehouse	Eric Davidson	20 March 1971
Guests: Olivia Newton-John, Una Stubbs and Marvin, Welch & Farrar.
32	13	"Episode 13"	Brian Whitehouse	Eric Davidson	27 March 1971
Guests: Clodagh Rogers, Una Stubbs and Hank Marvin.

=== Bank holiday special ===
No. overall	No. in series	Title	Directed by	Written by	Original release date
33	-	"Getaway with Cliff"	Michael Hurll	Eric Davidson	30 August 1971
Bank holiday special filmed on location in England and France. Guests: Hank Marvin, Olivia Newton-John, Séverine, Marvin, Welch & Farrar, Robert Parvin, Milton Reid, Marty Swift, Johnnie Wade, Zena Clifton, John Styles and Norrie Paramour and his Orchestra.

=== It's Cliff Richard: Series 3 ===
Produced by Michael Hurll. Broadcast Saturdays on BBC1 at 6:15 pm (except where noted). Series guests: The Pamela Devis Dancers, The Flirtations and Norrie Paramour & His Orchestra.

No. overall	No. in series	Title	Directed by	Written by	Original release date
34	1	"Episode 1"	Michael Hurll	Eric Davidson	24 December 1971
Guests: Olivia Newton-John, Labi Siffre, The New Seekers and Dandy Nichols.
35	2	"Episode 2"	Brian Whitehouse	Eric Davidson	1 January 1972
Guests: Olivia Newton-John, Dandy Nichols and The New Seekers in A Song for Europe 1972 singing song 1 of 6.
36	3	"Episode 3"	Brian Whitehouse	Eric Davidson	8 January 1972
Guests: Olivia Newton-John, Dandy Nichols and The New Seekers in A Song for Europe 1972 singing song 2 of 6.
37	4	"Episode 4"	Brian Whitehouse	Eric Davidson	15 January 1972
Guests: Olivia Newton-John, Dandy Nichols and The New Seekers in A Song for Europe 1972 singing song 3 of 6.
38	5	"Episode 5"	Michael Hurll	Eric Davidson	22 January 1972
Guests: The New Seekers in A Song for Europe 1972 singing song 4 of 6.
39	6	"Episode 6"	Brian Whitehouse	Eric Davidson	29 January 1972
Guests: Olivia Newton-John, Una Stubbs, Dandy Nichols and The New Seekers in A Song for Europe 1972 singing song 5 of 6.
40	7	"Episode 7"	Brian Whitehouse	Eric Davidson	5 February 1972
Guests: Una Stubbs, Olivia Newton-John and The New Seekers in A Song for Europe 1972 singing song 6 of 6.
41	8	"A Song for Europe 1972"	Brian Whitehouse	Eric Davidson	12 February 1972
A Song for Europe 1972. The New Seekers singing all six potential UK Eurovision entries.
42	9	"Episode 9"	Michael Hurll	Eric Davidson	19 February 1972
Guests: Cilla Black, Una Stubbs, Marty Swift and The New Seekers singing the winning Song for Europe.
43	10	"Episode 10"	Brian Whitehouse	Eric Davidson	26 February 1972
Guests: Séverine, Una Stubbs, Olivia Newton-John and Marty Swift.
44	11	"Episode 11"	Brian Whitehouse	Eric Davidson	4 March 1972
Guests: Labi Siffre, Una Stubbs, Marty Swift and Olivia Newton-John.
45	12	"Episode 12"	Michael Hurll	Eric Davidson	11 March 1972
Guests: Marvin, Welch & Farrar, Una Stubbs, Olivia Newton-John and Marty Swift.
46	13	"Episode 13"	Michael Hurll	Eric Davidson	18 March 1972
Guests: Petula Clark, The New Seekers, Una Stubbs, Marty Swift and Olivia Newton-John.

For eight weeks, Cliff Richard was the resident guest on the BBC1 TV series Cilla from January 13 - March 3, 1973, starring in A Song for Europe 1973.

=== It's Cliff Richard: Series 4 ===
Produced by Brian Whitehouse. Executive Producer: Michael Hurll. Broadcast Saturdays on BBC1. Series guests: Segment choreographed by Nigel Lythgoe, The Nolan Sisters and Alyn Ainsworth's orchestra.

No. overall	No. in series	Title	Directed by	Written by	Original release date
47	1	"Episode 1"	Brian Whitehouse	Peter Vincent	31 August 1974 at 8:15pm
Guests: Lyn Paul, Roy Kinnear and Pearly Gates.
48	2	"Episode 2"	Brian Whitehouse	Peter Vincent	7 September 1974 at 8:40pm
Guests: Dora Bryan, Labi Siffre and Pearly Gates.
49	3	"Episode 3"	Brian Whitehouse	Peter Vincent	14 September 1974 at 6:35pm
Guests: Aimi MacDonald, Ireen Sheer, Pearly Gates and Joe Baker.
50	4	"Episode 4"	Brian Whitehouse	Peter Vincent	21 September 1974 at 8:15pm
Guests: The Three Degrees and Pearly Gates.
51	5	"Episode 5"	Brian Whitehouse	Peter Vincent	28 September 1974 at 8:15pm
Guests: Julian Orchard Pearly Gates and Olivia Newton-John.

=== It's Cliff and Friends: Series 1 ===
Produced by Phil Bishop. Executive Producer: Michael Hurll. Broadcast Saturdays on BBC1. Musical director: Ronnie Hazlehurst.

No. overall	No. in series	Title	Directed by	Original release date
52	1	"Episode 1"	Phil Bishop	6 September 1975 at 6:10pm
Showcase for new talent.
53	2	"Episode 2"	Phil Bishop	13 September 1975 at 6:10pm
Showcase for new talent.
54	3	"Episode 3"	Phil Bishop	27 December 1975 at 5:15pm
Showcase for new talent.
55	4	"Episode 4"	Phil Bishop	3 January 1976 at 6:20pm
Showcase for new talent.
56	5	"Episode 5"	Phil Bishop	10 January 1976 at 6:10pm
Showcase for new talent.
57	6	"Episode 6"	Phil Bishop	17 January 1976 at 6:10pm
Showcase for new talent.
58	7	"Episode 7"	Phil Bishop	24 January 1976 at 6:20pm
Showcase for new talent.
59	8	"Episode 8"	Phil Bishop	31 January 1976 at 6:25pm
Showcase for new talent.
60	9	"Episode 9"	Phil Bishop	7 February 1976 at 5:55pm
Showcase for new talent.
61	10	"Episode 10"	Phil Bishop	14 February 1976 at 6:20pm
Showcase for new talent.

=== Televised concerts ===
No. overall	No. in series	Title	Directed by	Original release date
62	-	"In Concert: Cliff Richard"	Johnnie Stewart	July 24, 1976
Musical director: Barrie Guard.
63	-	"Cliff Richard & The Shadows: Thank You Very Much"	Garth Thomas	27 January 1980
Reunion concert with guests Elton John, Olivia Newton-John, Tim Rice and Adam Faith.
64	1	"Cliff In London"	Brian Whitehouse	2 November 1980
Highlights of live concert recorded at the Apollo Victoria.
65	2	"Cliff In London"	Brian Whitehouse	20 March 1981
Further highlights of live concert recorded at Apollo Victoria.
66	-	"Cliff Richard"	Stewart Morris	4 July 1983
Recording of concert featuring London Philharmonic Orchestra at the Royal Albert Hall.

=== Cliff! ===
One series. Produced by Norman Stone. Broadcast Mondays on BBC2 at 8:10 pm.

No. overall	No. in series	Title	Directed by	Original release date
1	1	"Rock & Roll Juvenile"	Norman Stone	23 November 1981
Documentary history series. Guests: Phil Everly, Adam Faith, Marty Wilde and Jack Good.
2	2	"Why Should The Devil Have All The Good Music?"	Norman Stone	30 November 1981
Documentary biography series. Guests: Kenny Everett, Dave Lee Travis, Adam Faith, Olivia Newton-John, Mike Read, Network 3 and Pat Boone.
3	3	"Travelling Light"	Norman Stone	7 December 1981
Documentary biography series following Cliff on tour.
4	4	"My Kinda Life"	Norman Stone	14 December 1981
Documentary biography series with guests: Olivia Newton-John and The Shadows.

=== Christmas specials ===
No.	Title	Original release date
67	"Together With Cliff Richard"	22 December 1991
Christmas special.
68	"Christmas With Cliff"	24 December 1995
Sally Magnusson hosts Cliff in A Songs of Praise special.
69	"The Gospel According To Cliff"	28 December 1997
A Songs of Praise Christmas special, with the All Soul's Concert Orchestra, recorded at the Royal Concert Hall, Nottingham.
70	"Cliff At Christmas"	17 December 2022
Sir Cliff is joined by special guests for this festive TV show from Hackney Church in London.

=== Birthday concert ===
No.	Title	Directed by	Original release date
71	"Cliff Richard: The Countdown Concert"	Hamish Hamilton	15 October 2000
60th birthday concert recorded at Birmingham's National Indoor Arena on 31 December 1999. Special guests were Hank Marvin and Russell Watson.

=== Retrospective ===
No.	Title	Directed by	Original release date
72	"Sir Cliff Richard at the BBC"	Unknown	December 17, 2022
To mark his 80th birthday, the BBC celebrates with a look back through its archives at some of Sir Cliff's most memorable performances and biggest hits..
