= Eins, Zwei, Drei =

2026 single by Look Mum No Computer

Single by Look Mum No Computer
- Released: 6 March 2026
- Genre: Synth-pop
- Length: 3:11
- Label: Look Mum No Label
- Songwriters: Sam Battle; Thomas Stengaard; Lasse Midtsian Nymann; Julie Aagaard
- Producers: Sam Battle; Thomas Stengaard; Lasse Midtsian Nymann

Look Mum No Computer singles chronology
"Hungry Vultures" (2025)	"Eins, Zwei, Drei" (2026)	"Marvellous" (2026)

Music video
- "Eins, Zwei, Drei" on YouTube

Eurovision Song Contest 2026 entry
- Country: United Kingdom
- Artist: Look Mum No Computer
- Languages: English; German
- Composers: Sam Battle; Thomas Stengaard; Lasse Midtsian Nymann; Julie Aagaard
- Lyricists: Sam Battle; Thomas Stengaard; Lasse Midtsian Nymann; Julie Aagaard

Finals performance
- Final result: 25th
- Final points: 1

Entry chronology
- ◄ "What the Hell Just Happened?" (2025)

Official performance video
- "Eins, Zwei, Drei" (second semi-final) on YouTube "Eins, Zwei, Drei" (grand final) on YouTube

"Eins, Zwei, Drei" (lit. 'One, Two, Three') is a song by British electronic musician Sam Battle, known by his stage name Look Mum No Computer. The song represented the United Kingdom in the Eurovision Song Contest 2026 after it was successfully chosen from a shortlist of songs through an internal selection process at the BBC.

The song was first officially announced and played on 6 March 2026 on The Scott Mills Breakfast Show on BBC Radio 2, where Battle was interviewed about the song and his participation in the contest. The single was released to streaming platforms the same day, as well as the official music video being released on the Eurovision Song Contest's YouTube channel.

== Background and composition ==
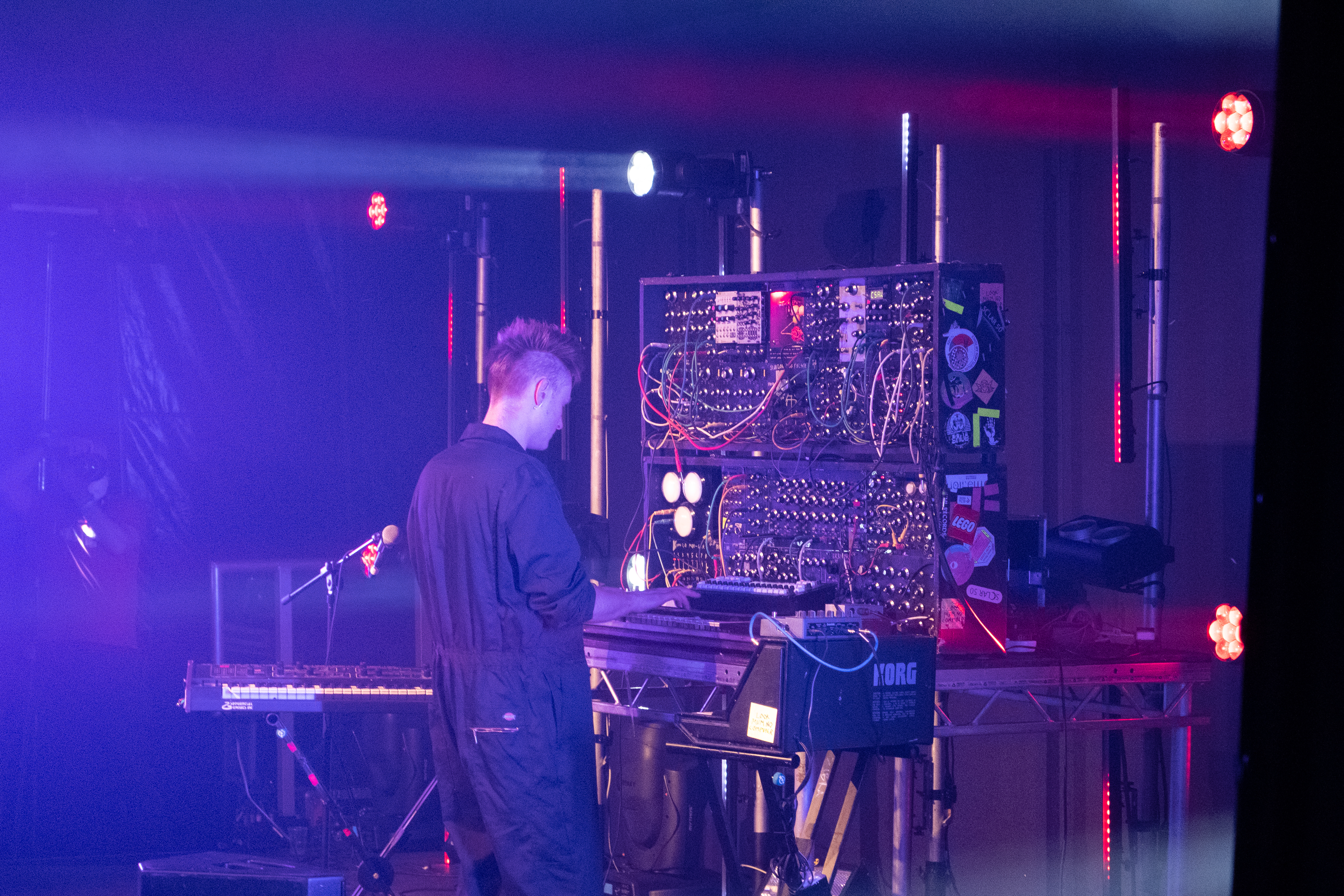
Look Mum No Computer performing with his Kosmo modular synthesizer, at the Electromagnetic Field festival at Eastnor Castle Deer Park, Herefordshire, UK in 2022. When asked "Will Kosmo be there?" at Eurovision, Battle responded that "I'm building a Kosmo for it... ...it's got multi-use... ...There's multi-purposes to this certain monolith of knobs and wires."

Halfway through 2025, Battle contacted the BBC in relation to Eurovision and asked "'Can we try and write a song for somebody or something?' not even expecting to do it for myself." The song that was written, "Eins, Zwei, Drei,", then ended up being on a shortlist of songs that were being considered for Eurovision for many months and then at the end of January 2026 the BBC contacted Battle and told him that his song had finally been chosen to go to Eurovision. Battle has further commented that "...I think um, writing this song actually caught them off guard cuz everything else was conventional. I think they all had, they had a bunch of projects they were working on already and I was very much, um, sort of shoved in and... like they said, "What have you done? This has completely changed things."

Alongside Battle the other songwriters are Thomas Stengaard, Lasse Midtsian Nymann and Julie Aagaard with Nymann having previously contributed to writing the "The Code" which was the winning song at the Eurovision Song Contest 2024 and Stengaard having contributed to writing "Only Teardrops" which was the winning song at the Eurovision Song Contest 2013.

Battle is also known for creating experimental electronic music using self-built instruments and vintage synthesizers.

== Reception ==
"Eins, Zwei, Drei" received polarised reviews from music critics following its release. Several outlets highlighted the song's eccentric and unconventional style, with critics noting its heavy use of synthesizers, shouted vocals, and humorous lyrics. Writing for The Independent, Adam White described the track as an "objectively terrible melange of synthesizers and a very loud man", though he also remarked that it at least provoked a reaction compared with more "beige" recent UK entries. Writing for The Guardian, Stuart Heritage described the track as an eccentric and novelty-driven entry that relied more on spectacle than traditional songwriting, noting its quirky lyrics and theatrical presentation.

In NME, Tom Skinner characterised the track as an '80s-inspired synth-pop song with Britpop influences, featuring pulsing electronic instrumentation and lyrics about escaping the monotony of everyday work. Skinner also noted that the song's chorus counts "one, two, three" in German and incorporates humorous British cultural references. Other reviewers were more positive about its novelty and entertainment value. The Times described the song as deliberately silly and reminiscent of novelty synth-pop tracks from the 1970s and 1980s, arguing that while it lacked lyrical depth it embraced the playful and eccentric spirit often associated with Eurovision. Scott Mills from BBC Radio 2 compared "Eins, Zwei, Drei" to a few songs like "Now You're Gone" by Basshunter or "Parklife" by Blur.

== Music video ==
The music video was directed by Johnny Goddard of the directorial collective Youth Hymns and was produced by A Running Commentary. The video was shot at Pinewood studios. It starts off with Look Mum No Computer sitting at a desk inside an office with numerous cables hanging down from the desk and onto the floor. On the wall to the left of Look Mum No Computer are three wall clocks and below each of them are telephones which are labelled after the cities; Berlin, Germany, Ramsgate, UK (the location of his museum) and Vienna, Austria which is the host city of the Eurovision Song Contest 2026. The walls of the office then appear to slide in towards him shrinking the space around his desk and enclosing him in. The walls of the office then reverse direction disappearing out of view and reveal behind him the large Kosmo modular synthesizer, that Look Mum No computer uses in all of his live performances.

Two "Kosmo" furry characters with TV sets for heads begin playing on small keyboards and join Look Mum No Computer alongside the modular synth. Jodie Bartle (Battle's younger sister and Wrexham A.F.C. Women player) is one of these furry characters in the video. All three of them then perform the chorus for the song and the two subsequent choruses in the music video all occur in this setting.

The second verse shows Look Mum No Computer working on the engine of a Mini Cooper, as well as unfolding a wing made of an ironing board onto the side of the Mini Cooper. He is then shown putting a map onto the bonnet of the Mini Cooper and circles his finger around Europe which has already been circled red on the map. He then gets inside the Mini Cooper and begins driving it and the second and third choruses show clips of him driving in the car being interspersed with him performing at the modular synth with the furry characters.

The bridge begins with a pizza that has had plastic moving teeth and eyes inserted inside it to make a face and the same teeth and eyes appear in a portrait of Henry VIII thats hanging on a wall in the office scene at the beginning of the clip and they have also previously appeared in other music videos by Look Mum No Computer, as well as in videos on their YouTube channel. At the end of the video he is seen flying away in the winged Mini Cooper over a chalk cliff, Beachy Head in East Sussex, with a synthesizer, keyboard, large speakers and an old computer strapped to the roof.

== Eurovision Song Contest 2026 ==
=== At Eurovision ===
The Eurovision Song Contest 2026 took place at Wiener Stadthalle in Vienna, Austria, and consisted of two semi-finals, held on 12 and 14 May, and the final on 16 May 2026. As the United Kingdom is a member of the "Big Four", Look Mum No Computer automatically qualified for the grand final. Nevertheless, the song was performed in the second semi-final albeit in a non-competitive spot, after Ukraine's Leléka and before Albania's Alis.

The song performed 14th, after Croatia's Lelek and before France's Monroe. It finished in last place with only one point, which was given by the jury vote.

== Charts ==
Chart performance for "Eins, Zwei, Drei"
Chart (2026)	Peak position
UK Indie Breakers (OCC)	10
UK Singles Sales (OCC)	13
UK Video Streaming (OCC)	36
