= Marion Keene =

British singer

Marion Keene (born Marion Davison; c. 1933) was a British big band singer in the late 1940s and early 1950s with British bands such as the Jack Parnell Orchestra and Oscar Rabin Band. She also made solo recordings, and replaced Alma Cogan in the 1959 Eurovision Song Contest British heats, but was not selected to become the British entry in the final, held later the same year.

== Recordings ==
Parlophone
Marion Davis with Oscar Rabin Band

- F 2344, March 1949, "A Little Bird Told Me"
- F 2369, July 1949, "Put Your Shoes On, Lucy"
- F 2400, February 1950, "Jealous Heart" (with Marjorie Daw)
- F 2404, March 1950, "Why Not Now" (with Dennis Hale) / "Don't Cry Joe"
- F 2435, December 1950, "Have I Told You Lately That I Love You" (with Marjorie Daw)
- F 2455, April 1951 "Listenin' to the Green Grass Grow" (with Marjorie Daw)

Nixa
Marion Davis with Eric Winstone Orchestra

- NY 7742, "Turn Back the Hands of Time" (with The Stagecoachers) / "Easy Come, Easy Go" (with Franklyn Boyd)
- NY 7743, March 1952, "I Don't Care"

His Master's Voice

- His Master's Voice POP 203 / 7M 395, April 1956, "Fortune Teller" / "A Dangerous Age"
- His Master's Voice POP 375, July 1957, "In the Middle of an Island" / "It's Not For Me to Say" (with orchestra cond. by Frank Cordell)

RCA

- RCA LOP 1001 1958 Rose-Marie (with Julie Andrews), Cast Member - RCA LOP 1001 (RD-27143 in England)
