= Cento Prize =

Prize for Italian Children's literature

The Children's Literature Prize "Fondazione Cassa di Risparmio di Cento" is an international competition aimed at authors of children's books (elementary and middle school) in Italian, original or translated.

== Origins ==
The Prize Cento was established in 1979 on the initiative of the Cassa di Risparmio di Cento and the Faculty of Education at the University of Ferrara. Initially the winner was determined by a panel of experts chaired by Gianni Rodari; the current method of selection was adopted in 1981.

The award is currently sponsored and organized by the Fondazione Cassa di Risparmio di Cento, with the support of the Region of Emilia-Romagna, the Province of Ferrara, the City of Cento, of the University of Ferrara and Bologna.

== Method of selection ==
The competition includes a first phase of selection among all entries of two sets of finalists by a Selection Committee consisting of: Guido Clericetti (cartoonist and scriptwriter), Fulvia Sisti (journalist), Giovanni Genovesi (University of Ferrara), Mario Schiavato (writer), Franco Frabboni (University of Bologna), Tiziana Ferrario (journalist), Paolo Valentini (journalist) and Folco Quilici (documentary filmmaker). To determine the final ranking and then the winners, a second phase involves two juries, one made up of students in the last three grades of elementary school, the other of students in the first three years of secondary school.

The top three authors in the two sections, are awarded respectively € 5,000, € 2,000 and € 1,000.

== Curiosity ==
Among the best known writers to have won the Prize Cento are Roberto Piumini (1979 and 1995), Bianca Pitzorno (1988), Daniel Pennac (1993), Susanna Tamaro (1995), and J. K. Rowling (1998).

== Hall of Fame ==
| Year | Winning | Year | Winning | Year | Winning |
|---|---|---|---|---|---|
| 1979 | Roberto Piumini | 1996 | Silvana Gandolfi, Guido Quarzo and Anna Vivarelli | 2013 | Elisa Castiglioni Giudici, Furio Scarpelli and Giacomo Scarpelli |
| 1980 | Marcello Venturi | 1997 | Ian Whybrow, Elizabeth Honey | 2014 | |
| 1981 | Marina Gemelli | 1998 | Angela Nanetti, J. K. Rowling | 2015 | |
| 1982 | Giovanni Arpino | 1999 | Maria Vago, Fiona May and Paola Zannoner | 2016 | |
| 1983 | Pino Nucci | 2000 | Domenica Luciani, Louis Sachar | 2017 | |
| 1984 | Renata Schiavo Campo | 2001 | Paul Shipton, Silvio Conte and Mariella Ottino | | |
| 1985 | Pier Mario Fasanotti | 2002 | Anna Vivarelli, Francesca d'Adamo | | |
| 1986 | Beatrice Solinas Donghi | 2003 | Anna Lavatelli, Uri Orlev | | |
| 1987 | Christine Nostlinger | 2004 | Sheila Och, Eoin Colfer | | |
| 1988 | Bianca Pitzorno | 2005 | Luigi Garlando, Michael Morpurgo | | |
| 1989 | Mario Lodi | 2006 | Roberta Grazzani, Angela Ragusa | | |
| 1990 | William Steig | 2007 | Sebastiano Ruiz Mignone, Jordan Sonnenblick | | |
| 1991 | Roberta Grazzani, Michel Lucet | 2008 | Kate DiCamillo, Pina Varriale | | |
| 1992 | Pinin Carpi, Sam Llewellyn | 2009 | Aquilino, Finn Zetterholm | | |
| 1993 | Ole Lund Kirkegaard, Daniel Pennac | 2010 | Angela Nanetti, Gianpietro Scalia | | |
| 1994 | Friedl Neuhauser, Barbara Novak and Alexander Rinesch, Silvana Gandolfi | 2011 | not assigned | | |
| 1995 | Susanna Tamaro and Roberto Piumini | 2012 | Guido Sgardoli | | |
