= Oriana Civile =

- Born: 19 November 1980 (age 45); Messina
- Origin: Capo d'Orlando
- Genres: Folk music, world music, blues
- Occupation: singer
- Instrument: guitar
- Years active: 1995–present
- Website: orianacivile.it

Oriana Civile (Italian pronunciation: [oˈrjaːna tʃiˈviːle]) (born in Messina, Sicily, 19 November 1980) is an Italian singer, performer, and songwriter. She is a scholar of Sicilian traditional music and an exponent of reviving the musical repertory of Sicilian oral tradition. Her performances cover many music genres: from the blues to jazz, from bossa nova to flamenco, from Argentine tango to comedy rock, from reviving folk music to exploring world music.

== Biography ==
Oriana Civile has been singing and performing since she was a young girl and, while studying at the science high school of Capo d'Orlando, she frequented local piano bars and was a curtain raiser for the cabaret that had various artists, including Salvo Ficarra, Renzino Barbera, Francesco Scimemi, and Enrico Guarnieri, with an already wide and varied repertory and the accompaniment of Umberto Tonarelli on acoustic guitar.

From 1995 to 1998 Oriana Civile was the voice of the Studio '90 cover band playing Italian light music, founded and directed by the pianist Franco Caliò.

From 2002 to 2005 she was the voice of the 500 Blues Mobile, a blues, rhythm and blues, and jazz band, with whom she also performed at the wedding feast of the Prince of Persia at the Royal Palace of Ficuzza (Province of Palermo).

From 2003 to 2007 she was the female voice of Be-Folk, a comedy band playing original music and lyrics (by Ciccio Piras).

From 2000 to 2012 she lived in Palermo, where she attended the faculties of Psychology and Music, uniting both fields in a diploma of specialization in Music Therapy. In 2004, she attended the theoretical/practical Laboratory of Ethnomusicology at the University of Palermo, led by Professor Girolamo Garofalo and based on the study of traditional oral music and singing. Discovering the hidden world of primitive societies, listening to music of oral tradition, and studying ethnomusicology documents collected by researchers in the field going back to 1800 made her understand that the most widely-known idea of Sicilian folk music is completely distorted. She dedicated herself to studying this almost unknown tremendous cultural heritage, reviving some classic examples.

In 2006 she entered to take part in the Palermo Workshop Cultural Association, with which she made two editions of the Horizontal Laboratory.

In 2007 and 2011 she took part in the O'scià festival, organized by Claudio Baglioni in Lampedusa, with the O'scià Maquè group that accompanied the singer-songwriter Antoine Michel.

In Maletto (Province of Catania) she participated in WOZ 04, an integrated design laboratory that carries out field research on ethnomusicology.

Together with Gera Bertolone, Egle Mazzamuto, Mariangela Vacanti, Mario Includine, Massimo Laguardia, Antonio Vasto, and Antonio Putzu she founded a group in tribute to Rosa Balistreri, Pirati a Palermo, which also performed at the Greek Theater of Segesta for the 2007 Calatafimi–Segesta Festival.

She was hired to record the songs to be used in Coop's DoReMiFaGnam section of its blog, with music by Enzo Rao and lyrics by Roberto Piumini, Ennio Cavalli, Mela Cecchi, Anna Sarfatti, Bruno Tognolini, Stefano Bordiglioni, and Giusi Quarenghi

In 2007 she began her experience in the recording studio making the album Abballalaluna by Mario Incudine. There followed several other record album collaborations, including: Singin' and Playin' the Blues by the blues man Andrea Notti; Yesss!!! by Antoine Michel; I Bambini di Ieri (Yesterday's Children) by Vincenzo Pomar and Maurizio Curcio acoustic quartet; C’era una Volta la Luna a Lampedusa (Once Upon a Time the Moon on Lampedusa) by Antoine Michel and O'scià Maquè.

In the show MadrePalermo by Salvo Piparo, she was the personification of the Moon who sang solo the woes of a forgotten Palermo.

In 2008 she attended Pierre Vaiana's musical internship "Funduq: Héritage, Recherche et Création" that took place in Palermo and Tunis, led by Pierre Vaiana, Salvatore Bonfede, Carlo Rizzo, and Fawzi Chekili, with coordination by Professor Girolamo Garofalo. From her Tunisian experience was born the disk "Funduq al-Mughannîn (l'auberge des chanteurs)," which was presented in 2009 in Belgium and in 2010 at the Garibaldi Theater of Enna by the group Funduq al-Mughannîn.

In the same year she participated as a vocal soloist in the project GangiBells, conceived by the Austrian Jürgen Weishäupl and developed by Maurizio Curcio.

From 2005 to 2010 she was the female voice in the Gruppo Terra (Earth Group) that accompanied the singer-songwriter Mario Incudine on tour.

In 2009 Civile entrusted Maurizio Curcio with her knowledge of the musical repertoire of Sicilian oral tradition, and from this collaboration was born Arie di Sicilia, a disk and project of international scope that earned her the invitation to represent Sicily with two concerts at the 9th Voix de Femmes International Festival in Belgium in November 2009. Within the same show Civile conducted an internship called "Women's musical repertory in the Sicilian tradition."

From 2013 she taught singing in kindergarten and elementary school. In 2013 and 2014 at the Kids' British School of Palermo and in the following years at the Cresta elementary school in Naso, Province of Messina.

At the age of 34 she decided to learn to accompany herself with the guitar and wrote Canto di una Vita Qualunque (Song of Anybody's Life), a singing theatrical production based on songs of the traditional Sicilian repertoire connected with the cycle of life: from birth to death, from the lullaby to the funereal lament. Produced for the first time in May 2015, with the support of the versatile musician Ciccio Piras, Song of Anybody's Life continues to achieve much critical and public acclaim. The show's tunes are collected on the album Canto di una Vita Qualunque: Le Canzoni released in August 2016; the disk was selected for the City of Loano National Prize for traditional Italian music. Oriana Civile is artistic director of the Naso Art Fest, an event centered on Sicilian artistic and cultural identity and on the promotion of the historical center of Naso, an important village in the Province of Messina, her native land.

She contributed to the birth of the AGLAIA Ethnomusicology Laboratory, a permanent research group and philological revival of music and songs of the Sicilian oral tradition composed by young artists and scholars, including Ciccio Piras, Gera Bertolone, and Giuseppe Giordano.

In 2016 Civile opened the concert of Noa and Gil Dor at the 23rd Capo d'Orlando in Blues Festival. She also presented her "Song of Anyone's Life" at the RAI Auditorium of Palermo and at the Beniamino Joppolo Theater of Patti, Sicily. She received the Miramare Prize for musicians from the Capo d'Orlando Academy of Music. She presided over the jury at the 22nd Canoro di Lascari Festival. She participated in making the soundtrack for the documentary Sorge il Sole: Una Storia Vera (The Sun Rises: A True Story) directed by Pietro Di Maria. In 2017 Civile was awarded the Maria Messina Literary Prize and the Women's World Prize for music.

== Projects ==
Oriana Civile presented:

- Canto di Una Vita Qualunque, a singing theater show based on her musical numbers drawn from the tradition Sicilian repertoire connected with the cycle of life (from birth to death, from lullaby to funereal lament)
- E Nascìu la Luci Eterna (And the Eternal Light Was Born), journey into the Nativity story, from the Annunciation to the Adoration, centered on songs of the Sicilian Christmas tradition
- Il Serio e il Faceto (The Serious and the Funny), a show exploring the contrasting humors of the Sicilian people
- Oriana Civile Canta la Sicilia, a concert-lecture on music of the Sicilian oral tradition, its function and contextualization
- A project dedicated to South American music together with the guitarist Nino Milia and flautist Daniela Giamo
- Un Matrimonio Infelice (An Unhappy Marriage) by Rosa Balistreri
- Together with Beatrice Damiano and Salvatore Barone, the theatrical show Di Mafia Si Muore Sempre Tre Volte (From the Mafia You Always Die Three Times), written and directed by Marina Romeo
- Testalonga e il Castello degli Intrighi (Testalonga and the Castle of Intrigues) by La Stretta di Longi Naturalistic Association.

== Discography ==
=== Soloist ===
- 2022: STORII - tra il serio e il faceto (STORIES - between the serious and the facetious); Suoni Indelebili
- 2016: Canto di una Vita Qualunque (Song of Anybody's Life); self-produced
- 2013: Mammissima (COOP application for smartphone); music by Enzo Rao; lyrics by: Roberto Piumini, Ennio Cavalli, Mela Cecchi, Anna Sarfatti, Bruno Tognolini, Stefano Bordiglioni, and Giusi Quarenghi
- 2009: Arie di Sicilia (Airs of Sicily) by Oriana Civile and Maurizio Curcio; On Air Records

=== Collaborations ===
- 2017: D'Acqua e Di Rosi (Of Water and of Roses) by Mario Incudine; produced by Finisterre
- 2011: C'era una Volta la Luna a Lampedusa (Once Upon a Time the Moon on Lampedusa) by Antoine Michele and O'scià Maquè
- 2008: Funduq al-Mughannîn = L'Auberge des Chanteurs; Az Productions
- 2008: I Bambini di Ieri (Yesterday's Children) by Vincenzo Pomar and Maurizio Curcio acoustic quartet; produced by Palermo Workshop
- 2007: Yesss!!! by Antoine Michel; The Shark Records & Co.
- 2007: Singin' and Playin' the Blues by Andrea Notti; produced by Custom Records
- 2007: Abballalaluna by Mario Incudine; Teatro del Sole

=== Compilations ===
- 2008: Glocal Sound & Ambient Vision vol. 1; curated by FolkaLab collective; produced by Formedonda & ZL-Zone al Limite

=== Films and soundtracks ===
- 2016: Soundtrack for the documentary Sorge il Sole: Una Storia Vera (The Sun Rises: A True Story), directed by Pietro Di Maria
- 2014: Soundtrack for the book trailer Trinacrime: Storia Narrata di un Pentito di Mafia by Alessandro Vizzino, Edizioni Imprimatur
- 2012: Soundtrack for the film Ogni Santo Giorno in Occasione by the 388° Festino di Santa Rosalia, directed by Ruggero Di Maggio, produced by Mon Amour Films
- 2012: "La canzone di Stella", Soundtrack for the film Ore Diciotto in Punto (Six PM on the Dot), composta da Francesco Di Fiore, directed by Pippo Gigliorosso
- 2012: Supporting actress in the film Il Tarlo, produced by Lanzafame and Clemente, Associazione Making; directed by Marco Lanzafame
- 2012: Soundtrack for the "Wedding Palermo" commercial; lyrics: William Shakespeare, music: Maurizio Curcio, produced by: Pubblimedia, Francesco Andolina Publications, directed by Patrizia Passalacqua
- 2012: Η Σικελία (Sikelia), a documentary on Mediterranean music in Sicily, produced and broadcast by the ERT (Greek state TV); directed by Panos Karkanevatos
- 2011: Sicilia Svelata: Garibaldi, Fratello d'Italia by Jean-Paul Barreaud, directed by Gabriele Gismondi
  - Sicilia svelata: Il Mistero del Bellumvider by Jean-Paul Barreaud, directed by Gabriele Gismondi
  - Sicily Unveiled meets CE.S.I.E. by Jean-Paul Barreaud, directed by Gabriele Gismondi
- 2009: Supporting actress in the film Sulle Orme dei Suoni by the S.A.C. Cultural Association, as a performer of the traditional song style called "a la Santaluciota," directed by Michele Piccione

== Prizes ==
- Premio Antimafia Salvatore Carnevale 2017
- Premio Letterario Maria Messina 2017
- Premio Mondo Donna 2017
- Premio Armonie al Miramare 2016
- Premio Enzo Barbarino 2010
