= Heike Brandt =

German writer and translator

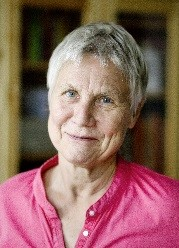
Heike Brandt

Heike Brandt (born 1947) is a German writer and translator of books for children who has translated over 70 books from English to German.

== Life ==
Heike Brandt was born in Jever and grew up in Berlin. She lives in Berlin-Kreuzberg.

Aside from translation, her first book was a biography of the feminist and writer Hedwig Dohm. After Brandt had translated several children's books by Elizabeth Honey, the pair directly collaborated to write To the boy in Berlin (2007).

== Works ==
=== Translations ===
- Lasst den Kreis geschlossen: Roman by Mildred D. Taylor. Translated from the American Let the Circle Be Unbroken. Weinheim: Beltz & Gelberg, 1987.
- (tr.) Andis Krieg by Billi Rosen. 1990.
- (tr.) Überlebt: als Kind in deutschen Konzentrationslagen [Survived: As a child in a German concentration camp] by Agnes Sassoon. Translated from the English Agnes: how my spirit survived. 1992.
- (tr.) Liebe Tracey, liebe Mandy [Dear Tracey, love Mandy] by John Marsden. 1996.
- (tr.) Salamander im Netz by Elizabeth Honey. 2003.
- (tr.) Monsterwochen [Monster weeks] by Ron Koertge. Translated from the English Stoner and Spaz. Hamburg: Carlsen, 2004.

=== Other ===
- Die Menschenrechte haben kein Geschlecht: die Lebensgeschichte der Hedwig Dohm [Human rights have no sex: the life story of Hedwig Dohm], Weinheim: Beltz & Gelberg, 1989.
- Katzensprünge: Roman [Cat leaps: a novel], 1995
- Wie ein Vogel im Käfig: Roman [Like a bird in a cage: a novel]. Weinheim: Beltz & Gelberg, 2003
- (with Elizabeth Honey) To the boy in Berlin, Crows Nest, New South Wales: Allen & Unwin, 2007
