= Vittorio Stagni =

Italian actor and voice actor

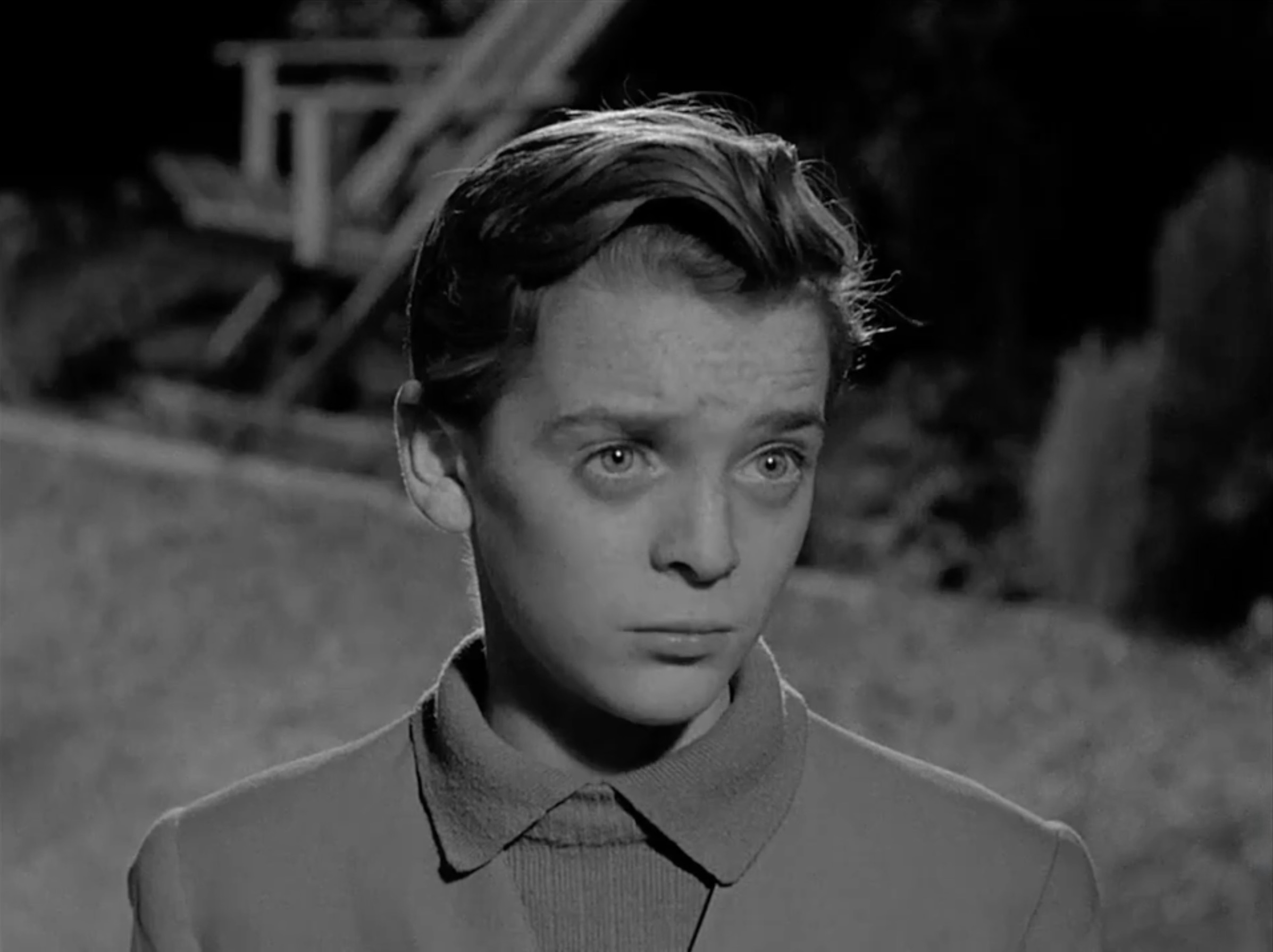
- Stagni in Fugitive in Trieste (1951)
- Born: 17 December 1937 (age 88); Milan, Italy
- Occupations: Actor; voice actor; dubbing director; musician
- Years active: 1948–present
- Children: Ilaria Stagni

Vittorio Stagni (born 17 December 1937) is an Italian actor and voice actor.

== Biography ==
Born in Milan to an actor and theatre administrator, Stagni began his acting career at a very young age. He studied hard to become an actor, mime and circus performer, coached by such figures as Pëtr Šarov, Lee Strasberg, Jacques Lecoq, Giancarlo Cobelli and the Circo Orfei. When he was 7 years old, Stagni acted in a play directed by Luchino Visconti, while one of his first roles as a voice actor was in Dumbo, in which he provided the Italian-dubbed voice of Skinny. At 12, he sang Ave Maria at Linda Christian and Tyrone Power's marriage. In the 1950s he also began to act on screen and in radio plays. Through the years, Stagni's performances onstage were directed by Aldo Trionfo, Franco Enriquez, Orazio Costa, Vittorio Gassman, Gigi Proietti, Giancarlo Sbragia, and Giorgio Albertazzi.

As a voice actor, Stagni performed in a few Italian animated films and dubbed many Disney characters in Italian, such as Mickey Mouse in the 1970s, Br'er Rabbit in the 2nd redubbing of Song of the South, and Donald Duck in the 1988 animated movie Who Framed Roger Rabbit. He is also Rick Moranis' official Italian voice and has dubbed Alvaro Vitali and Wallace Shawn in many of their roles, also providing the voices of Warwick Davis' Filius Flitwick in the Italian version of the Harry Potter film franchise and multiple characters, including Mr. Crocker, in the animated series Fairly OddParents, of which he also directed the dubbing process. Stagni even dubbed two actresses, Anne Ramsey and Linda Hunt, in Italian.

He is also a musician, having written and performed soundtracks for plays, films, TV shows and documentaries.

=== Personal life ===
Stagni was previously married to voice actress Lorenza Biella. They have a daughter, actress and voice actress Ilaria Stagni.

== Filmography ==
=== Cinema ===
- Fugitive in Trieste (1951)
- Good Folk's Sunday (1953)
- Commissariato di notturna (1974)
- Il nano e la strega (a.k.a. King Dick, 1975) – voice
- Hit Squad (1976)
- La compagna di banco (1977)
- Antonio Gramsci: The Days of Prison (1977)
- Evelina e i suoi figli (1990)
- The House of Chicken (2001)
- L'apetta Giulia e la signora Vita (2003) – voice
- Bentornato Pinocchio (2008) – voice
- Acid Space (2015) – voice

=== Television ===
- La trincea – TV miniseries (1961)
- Il caso Maurizius – TV miniseries (1961)
- Il cappello nero – TV series, episode 1.5 (1967)
- Caravaggio – TV miniseries, third episode (1967)
- Il Circolo Pickwick – TV series, 3 episodes (1968)
- Addio giovinezza! – TV film (1968)
- La pietra di Luna – TV miniseries (1972)
- Anna Kuliscioff – TV miniseries, 2 episodes (1982)
- Una donna per amico – TV series, fifth episode (1998)

== Dubbing roles ==
=== Animation ===
- Young Flower in Bambi (first Italian dub)
- Skinny in Dumbo (first Italian dub)
- Waldo in Mr. Magoo
- Dormouse in Alice in Wonderland
- Coil Man in The Impossibles
- Some of Jaq's lines in Cinderella (1967 Italian redub)
- Klunk in Dastardly and Muttley in Their Flying Machines
- Various characters in Festival of Family Classics, South Park (first Italian dub), Scaredy Squirrel
- Mickey Mouse in Fantasia (1973 Italian dub)
- Templeton in Charlotte's Web
- Br'er Rabbit in Song of the South (1973 Italian redub)
- Fiver in Watership Down
- Autocat in Motormouse and Autocat (1980s Italian redub)
- Black Heart in Care Bears Movie II: A New Generation
- Donald Duck and Smart Ass in Who Framed Roger Rabbit
- Critterina in Happily Ever After
- Hunch in Rock-a-Doodle
- T.R. Chula in An American Tail: Fievel Goes West
- Sir Chamberlain in The Swan Princess, The Swan Princess: Escape from Castle Mountain
- I.R. Baboon in Cow & Chicken, I Am Weasel
- Narrator in What a Cartoon!
- Rocko in The Pebble and the Penguin
- Pook in Gargoyles
- Axe in Beauty and the Beast: The Enchanted Christmas
- Jack Jeebs in Men in Black
- Denzel Crocker (season 1-episode 10.5), Dr. Bender (first voice), The Bronze Kneecap, Cupid and other characters in Fairly OddParents
- Little Boy in Spriggan
- Jaken in Inuyasha (season 1 and The Final Act)
- Clyde Donovan in South Park: Bigger, Longer & Uncut
- Steve in Scooby-Doo and the Alien Invaders
- Onus in Treasure Planet
- Bill in Finding Nemo
- Lucky Jack in Home on the Range
- Kif Kroker (seasons 1–7) and Gorgac in Futurama
- Monty in Stuart Little 3: Call of the Wild
- Chief in The Fox and the Hound 2
- the Porcupine in Bambi II
- Gohei in Sword of the Stranger
- Professor Kipple in Planet 51
- Rambos in Tekkaman
- Elfi Whammie in The Life and Times of Juniper Lee
- Marvin Finklehimer in The Amazing World of Gumball
- Mr. Hedgehog in The Animals of Farthing Wood
- Dr. Clamp in Galactik Football
- Luke in Lonesome Dove
- Charlie in Bananas in Pyjamas
- Hassim in Final Fantasy: Legend of the Crystals
- Bogel in The 13 Ghosts of Scooby-Doo
- Paw Rugg in Atom Ant
- Hiroshi Kochatani in GTO – Great Teacher Onizuka
- Galilei in Shin Getter Robo vs Neo Getter Robo
- Mitsuo Aritake in Zaion: I Wish You Were Here
- Herbert (episode 14.17-season 18), Seamus (episode 15.14-season 18) and librarian in Family Guy

=== Live-action ===
- Armido in Serafino
- Alvaro Vitali (1970s)
- Chan Chu Kai in The Gang That Sold America
- Bob in City of the Living Dead
- Cato Fong in The Return of the Pink Panther, The Pink Panther Strikes Again
- Billy Kwan in The Year of Living Dangerously
- Mama Fratelli in The Goonies
- Momma in Throw Momma from the Train
- Horace in Wimzie's House
- Jack Jeebs in Men in Black, Men in Black II
- Monty in Stuart Little, Stuart Little 2
- Filius Flitwick in Harry Potter and the Philosopher's Stone, Harry Potter and the Goblet of Fire, Harry Potter and the Order of the Phoenix, Harry Potter and the Half-Blood Prince, Harry Potter and the Deathly Hallows – Part 2
- Wiley in Grown Ups, Grown Ups 2
- Denzel Crocker in A Fairly Odd Movie: Grow Up, Timmy Turner!, A Fairly Odd Christmas

== Discography ==
=== Soundtracks ===
- Aretino's Stories of the Three Lustful Daughters (1972, co-written with Elio Maestosi); a single, performed by Germana Dominici, was also released: La ballata dell'Aretino (Two Nuns, 1972)
- Le mille e una notte... e un'altra ancora! (1972, co-written with Elio Maestosi)

=== Albums ===
- Giochi musicali (1974, Panda Records)
- Renato Rascel's Nel mio piccolo (RCA Italiana, 1975): Stagni and Franco Cremonini perform L'amore è progressista
- Il meraviglioso circo del mare, with Elvio Monti (Two Nuns, 1976)
- M... come Musica (Titian Records, 1980)

=== Singles ===
- Germana Dominici – La ballata dell'Aretino (Two Nuns, 1972): co-author
- Enrico Lazzareschi – Corri cavallo / Sotto il canapé (King Universal, 1972): co-author

=== Featuring in compilations ===
- Vroommm – Funk Cinematique (Plastic Records, 1999): Blues Elena
- Max Gazzè – Una musica può fare remixes (VCI Recordings, 1999): vocals in Feel the Beat Version
