= Bianca Pitzorno =

Italian writer and politician

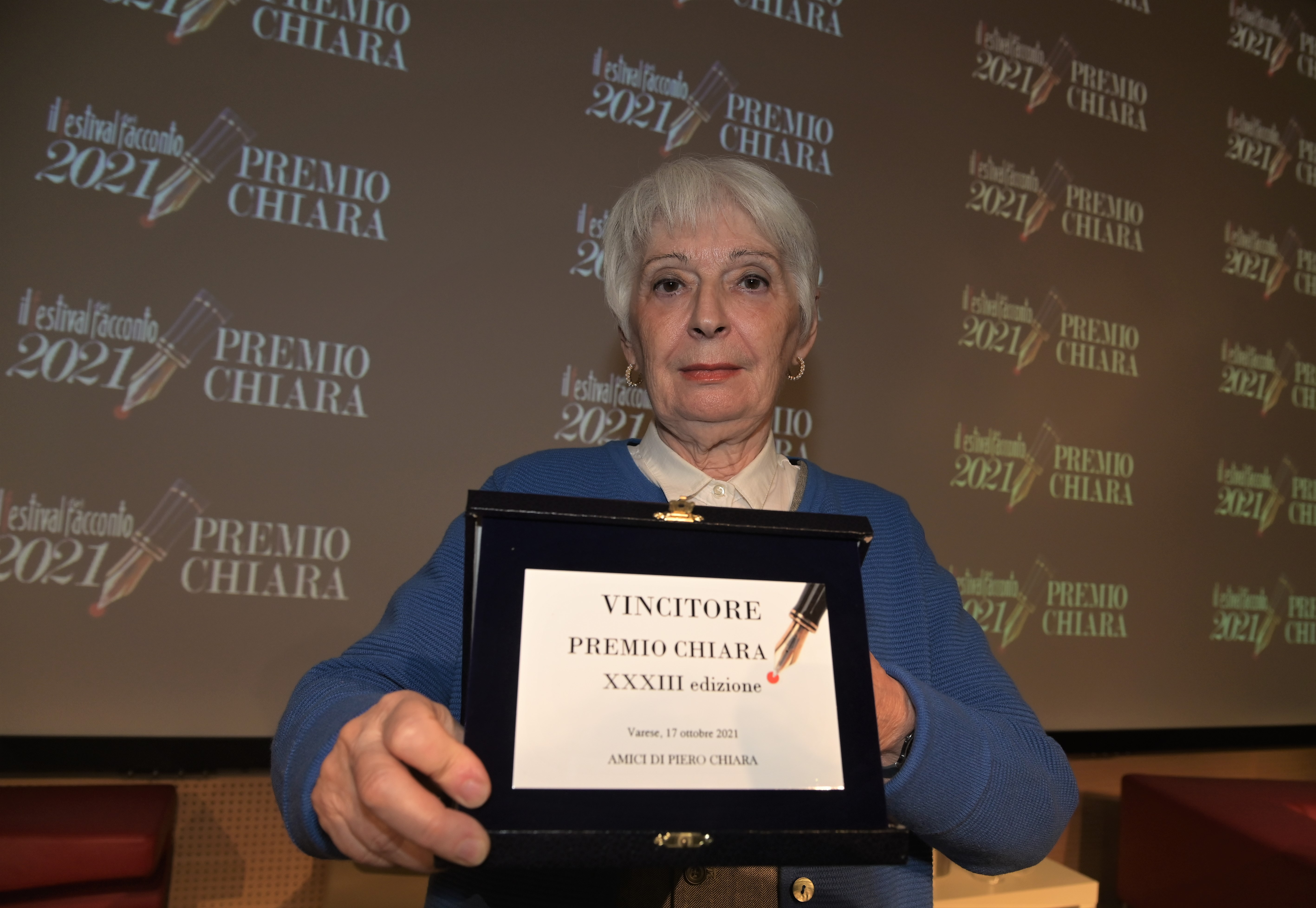
Bianca Pitzorno

Bianca Pitzorno (Italian pronunciation: [ˈbjaŋka pitˈtsorno]; born 12 August 1942) is an Italian writer best known for her books for children and young adults. She is considered one of Italy's most important authors in that field.

She was born in Sassari. She studied archaeology and classical literature and then began a career producing programs for television. She began writing books for girls when she was 28. She also writes plays, screenplays and lyrics for songs. Pitzorno lives and works in Milan.

During the 1970s, she was head of children's programming for RAI television. Later, she worked on the children's television series L'albero azzurro ("The blue tree").

Her books have been translated into many languages including French, German, Spanish, Greek, Polish, Hungarian, Korean and Japanese. Her children's stories blend contemporary reality with elements of magic.

She has translated into Italian works by authors such as J. R. R. Tolkien, Sylvia Plath, David Grossman, Tove Jansson and Soledad Cruz Guerra.

In April 2026 her novel La sonnambula, published by Bompiani, was selected among the twelve books in competition for the Strega Prize.

Pitzorno is a UNICEF Goodwill ambassador. She helped establish a library project in Cuba which makes literature in Italian and literature translated from Italian available to Cuban children. She also helps provide Cuban literature translated into Italian to youth in Italy.

== Awards ==
- Premio Andersen dell’Infanzia
- Premio Castello di Sanguinetto
- Cento Prize
- finalist for the Hans Christian Andersen Award

== Selected works ==
- Clorofilla dal cielo blu ("Chlorophyll from a blue sky") (1974), also adapted for film
- La bambola dell'alchimista ("The alchemist's doll") (1988)
- Ascolta il mio cuore ("Listen to my heart") (1991)
- La voce segreta ("The secret voice") (1998)
- Una scuola per Lavinia ("A school for Lavinia") (2005)

== Works translated into English ==
- The House in the Tree, Bloomsbury USA, 2017
- The littlest witch, Catnip Publishing, London 2018
- Lavinia and the magic ring, Catnip Publishing, London 2018
- The Seamstress of Sardinia, Text Publishing Company, Melbourne 2023.
