= Elizabeth Honey =

Australian writer (born 1947)

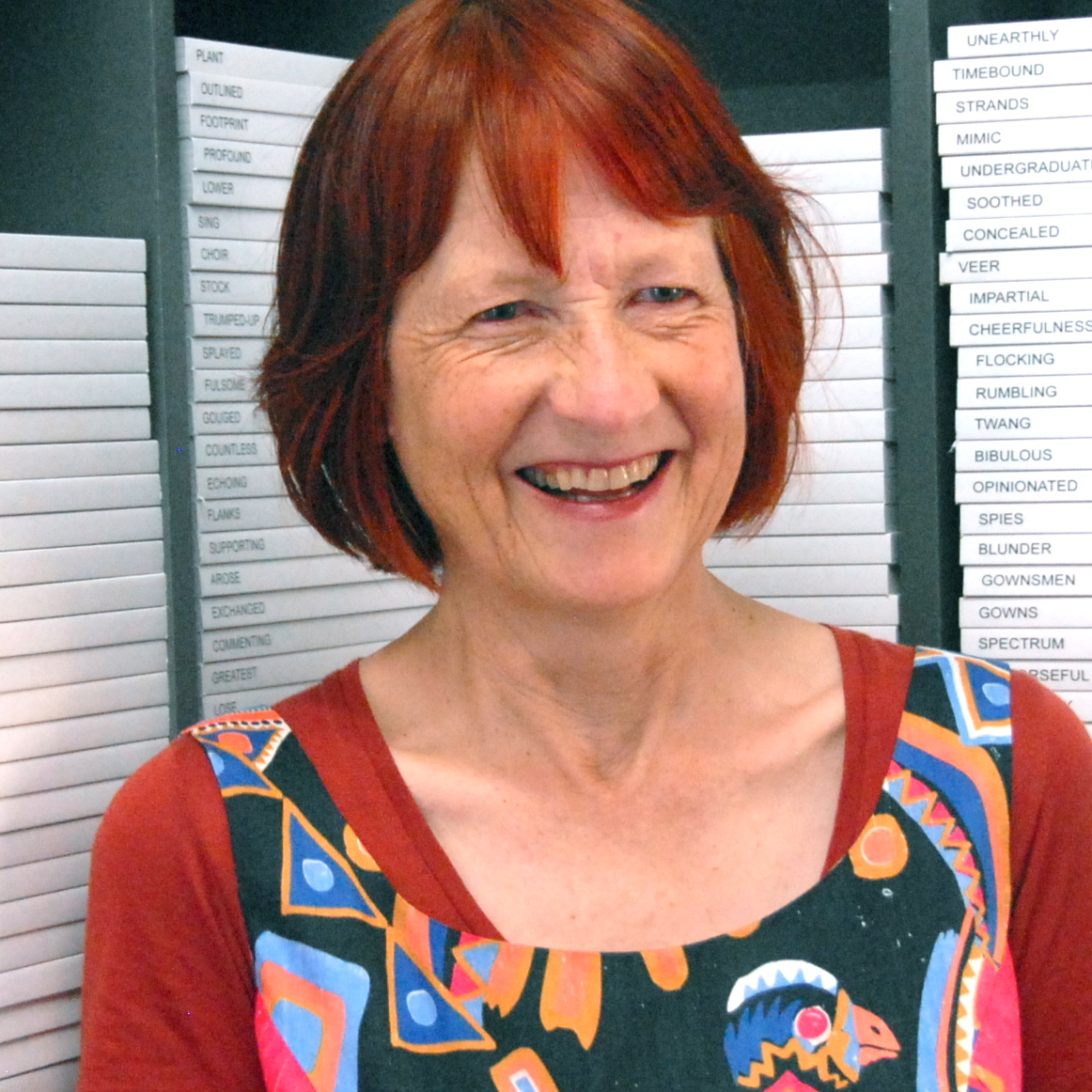
- Honey in 2013
- Born: 7 February 1947 (age 79); Wonthaggi, Victoria, Australia
- Occupations: Writer, illustrator, poet
- Writing career
- Genres: Children's literature, children's poetry, children's theatre
- Website: elizabethhoney.com

Elizabeth Madden Honey (Note: Her first name in German-language publications is usually given as "Elisabeth" (e.g. Amazon)) (born 7 February 1947) is an Australian children's author, illustrator and poet, best known for her picture books and middle-grade novels. Her books have been published internationally. She lives in Richmond, Melbourne.

In 1997, she won the Children's Book of the Year Award: Picture Book for Not a Nibble. She also received the Prize Cento and the Young Australians Best Book Award (YABBA) for 45 & 47 Stella Street and everything that Happened. In 2001, she was the recipient of the Australian Wilderness Society Environment Award for Children's Literature.

== Life and career ==
Honey was born in the coal mining town of Wonthaggi in Gippsland, Victoria. She grew up on a dairy farm, the third in a family of four. A sickly child, she became an avid reader. After the family moved to a farm near Geelong she attended high school at Morongo Girls' College.

In Melbourne, Honey studied art at Swinburne Technical College, where she was in the second intake at Australia’s first film school.

‘The predominate traits shared by the students were artistic talent, youth and high spirits, and boundless confidence and optimism. It was the ‘Swinging Sixties’ after all and art students were in the vanguard of taste, fashion and ideas…’

The mix of characters and talents at Swinburne had a profound influence on Honey, and the unstructured nature of the course which gave students the licence to experiment. They absorbed films from around the world at the Melbourne Film Festival and staged the student revues ‘Braindrops’ and ‘68mm’.

‘They eat, sleep and drink the revue, with an intensity that is almost alarming.’

Laurie Pendlebury, Head of Swinburne Art School

Honey worked briefly at the ABC Channel 2, then in film, The Naked Bunyip and The Adventures of Barry McKenzie, advertising at W J Haysom then George Patterson, followed by extensive travel. Honey began work as a freelance illustrator, her commissions including drawings for newspapers, The Age and The Sydney Morning Herald, and stamps for Australia Post. From 1976 to 1986 she published a calendar of illustrations, but found children's book illustration the most rewarding work. In 1988, Princess Beatrice and the Rotten Robber was published, her first book as both author and illustrator. Publisher, Rosalind Price at Allen and Unwin encouraged her work and ‘she has since become an iconic voice in Australian children's literature, going on to write and illustrate a breadth of award-winning children's novels, poetry collections, as well as picture books for children of all ages. She is known for writing that is "characteristically humorous and inventive, and features outspoken characters”.

Honey draws on family life, evident in her first poetry book Honey Sandwich.

Looking for my sandals.

Looking for my hat.

I spend all my life

doing that.

In 1995 her first novel 45 + 47 Stella Street and everything that happened was published. It was translated into many languages and became the first in a series, the most recent From Stella Street to Amsterdam, was published in 2020, twenty five years after the first book.

== Works ==
=== Picture books ===
- Princess Beatrice and the Rotten Robber (1988)
- The Cherry Dress (1993)
- Not a Nibble! (1996)
- The Moon in the Man (2003)
- I'm Still Awake, Still! (2008)
- That's not a Daffodil! (2011)
- Ten Blue Wrens: And What a Lot of Wattle! (2011)
- Hop Up! Wriggle Over! (2015)

=== Poetry ===
- Honey Sandwich (1993)
- Mongrel Doggerel (1998)
- The Moon in the Man (2003)

=== Novels ===
- Don't Pat the Wombat!, illustrated by Gig Clarke (1996)
- What Do You Think, Feezal? (1997)
- Remote Man (2000)

==== Stella Street series ====
- 45 + 47 Stella Street and Everything that Happened (1995)
- Fiddle-back (1998)
- The Ballad of Cauldron Bay (2004)
- To the Boy in Berlin with Heike Brandt (2007)
- From Stella Street to Amsterdam (2020)

=== Activity books ===
- The Book of Little Books (1994)

=== Collaborations ===
- Energy for Kids with Gilbert Tippett (1986)
- Trees for Kids with Ian Edwards (1998)
- To the Boy in Berlin with Heike Brandt (2007)
- Our Island with the children of Gununa, Mornington Island, and Alison Lester (2014)
- I'm Still Awake, Still! with composer Sue Johnson (2008)

== Works as illustrator ==
- S.C.A.B., by Manny Clarke (1975)
- The Twenty-Seventh Annual African Hippopotamus Race, by Morris Lurie (1977)
- Puzzles Galore!, by Meryl Brown Tobin (1978)
- Snakes Alive!, by Maureen Stewart (1978)
- So What's New?, by Bettina Bird (1978)
- Gone Children, by Phyllis Harry (1978)
- Gino and Dan, by Carolyn Marrone (1979)
- Us Three Kids, by Bettina Bird (1979)
- Call It Quits, by Bettina Bird (1979)
- Fame and Misfortune, by John Jones (1979)
- Feel, Value, Act, by Laurie Brady (1979)
- Growing things: Nature Study Ideas for the Primary School, by Brian McKinlay (1979)
- Mexican Beans, by L. M. Napier (1980)
- All Change at the Station, by Susan Burke (1980)
- Barney, Boofer, and the Cricket Bat, by Judith Worthy (1980)
- More Puzzles Galore!, by Meryl Brown Tobin (1980)
- Themes through the Year, by Cathy Hope (1981)
- The Tucker Book, by Jessie Apted (1981)
- Salt River Times, by William Mayne (1982)
- Flora's Treasures, by Ted Greenwood (1982)
- Brave with Ben, by Christobel Mattingley (1982)
- History Alive: Introducing Children to History around Them, by Brian McKinlay (1983)
- Melissa's Ghost, by Michael Dugan (poet) (1986)
- Boiler at Breakfast Creek, by Roger Vaughan Carr (1986)
- The Prize, by Helen Higgs (1986)
- I Don't Want to Know: Towards a Healthy Adolescence, by Ted Greenwood (1986)
- Outdoors for Kids, by Brian McKinlay (1987)
- Oh No! Not Again, by Linda Allen (1989)
- Dream Time: New Stories by Sixteen Award-Winning Authors, edited by Toss Gascoigne, Jo Goodman and Margot Terrell (1991)
- No Gun for Asmir, by Christobel Mattingley (1993)
- Asmir in Vienna, by Christobel Mattingley (1995)

== Theatre ==
Mr Bleak and the Etryop premiered at the Melbourne Comedy Festival (2007). It told the story of confused Mr Bleak, who in his drive for productivity, discovers poetry after the intervention of exuberant schoolchildren. The play toured Victoria in 2008.

A musical theatre production of I'm Still Awake, Still!, inspired by the songs by Honey and Sue Johnson, directed by Jessica Wilson, premiered at the Melbourne Arts Centre in 2011, and toured the US and Australia in 2014. The Age review noted "..the clever blend of comedy and song, which celebrates in the zaniest possible way the playfulness of children, while giving them a rather sophisticated glimpse into the world of music."

A theatrical adaptation of That's not a Daffodil, adapted from the book by Honey with Görkem Acaroglu premiered in Melbourne in 2015, before going on to tour Victoria in 2017. It tells the story of a young boy who is given a daffodil bulb by the old Turkish gardener next door.

== Awards and honours ==
1994

- Children's Book of the Year Award: Younger Readers, Honour Book for Honey Sandwich

1996

- Children's Book of the Year Award: Younger Readers, Honour Book for 45 & 47 Stella Street and everything that happened
- Adelaide Festival Awards for Literature, National Children's Literature Award shortlist for 45 & 47 Stella Street and everything that happened

1997

- Children's Book of the Year Award: Picture Book for Not a Nibble
- Prize Cento for Children's Literature (Italy) for 45 & 47 Stella Street and everything that happened
- Young Australians Best Book Awards (YABBA) Victoria: Children's Choice Award – Fiction for Older Readers for 45 & 47 Stella Street and everything that happened
- Children's Book of the Year Award: Younger Readers, Honour Book for Don't Pat The Wombat!
- Children Reading Outstanding Writers (CROW) South Australia: Children's Choice Award – years 3–5 for Don't Pat The Wombat!

1998

- COOL Award, Fiction for Older Readers shortlist for 45 & 47 Stella Street and everything that happened
- COOL Award, Fiction for Older Readers shortlist for Don't Pat The Wombat!

1999

- Kids Own Australian Literature Awards (KOALA) New South Wales: Children's Choice Award finalist for Not a Nibble and 45 & 47 Stella Street and everything that happened
- New South Wales Premier's Literary Awards shortlist for What do you think, Feezal?

2000

- Kids Own Australian Literature Awards (KOALA) New South Wales: Children's Choice Award finalist for Not a Nibble
- Young Australians Best Book Awards (YABBA) Victoria: Children's Choice Awards shortlist for Honey Sandwich
- Kids Own Australian Literature Awards (KOALA) New South Wales: Children's Choice Award finalist for 45 & 47 Stella Street and everything that happened
- West Australian Young Readers' Book Award (WAYRBA), shortlist for Fiddle-back
- Kids Own Australian Literature Awards (KOALA) New South Wales: Children's Choice Award shortlist for Don't Pat The Wombat!
- Adelaide Festival Awards for Literature, National Children's Literature Award shortlist for What do you think, Feezal?

2001

- The Wilderness Society (Australia) Environment Award for Children's Literature for Remote Man
- Young Australians Best Book Awards (YABBA) Victoria: Children's Choice Awards shortlist for Don't Pat The Wombat!
- West Australian Young Readers' Book Award (WAYRBA), shortlist for What do you think, Feezal?

2002

- West Australian Young Readers' Book Award (WAYRBA), shortlist for Remote Man

2003

- Children's Book of the Year Award: Early Childhood, Notable Book for The Moon in the Man
- APRA Music Awards of 2003: Most Performed Jazz Work, Nominated with Susan Johnson and Coco's Lunch for "All the Wild Wonders", a poem adapted to song from The Moon in the Man
- Deutscher Jugendliteraturpreis (German Youth Literature Prize): Kinderbuch (Children's book) section shortlist for Remote Man, German title: Salamander im Netz
- Selection to the New York Public Library Books for the Teen Age List for Remote Man

2005

- Children's Book of the Year Award: Younger Readers, Notable Book for The Ballad of Cauldron Bay
- Australian Psychological Society: Children's Peace Literature Award, shortlist for The Ballad of Cauldron Bay

2008

- Australian Publishers Design Awards: Best Designed Book for Young Adults for To the Boy in Berlin with Heike Brandt
- Selection to The White Ravens Catalog of the International Youth Library in Munich, for To the Boy in Berlin with Heike Brandt

2009

- Speech Pathology Australia Book of the Year Award: Young Children's shortlist for I'm still awake, still!
- West Australian Young Readers' Book Award (WAYRBA), shortlist for To the Boy in Berlin with Heike Brandt

2012

- Children's Book of the Year Award: Early Childhood, Honour Book for That's not a daffodil!
- Children's Book of the Year Award: Early Childhood, Notable Book for Ten Blue Wrens and what a lot of wattle!
- Prime Minister's Literary Awards: Children's Fiction, shortlist for Ten Blue Wrens and what a lot of wattle!
- Speech Pathology Australia Book of the Year Award: Young Children's shortlist for Ten Blue Wrens and what a lot of wattle!
- Queensland Premier's Literary Awards: Best Children's Book, shortlist for Ten Blue Wrens and what a lot of wattle!
