= Aquilino =

Aquilino is a surname and given name. Notable people with the name include:

== Given name ==
- Aquilino Bonfanti (1943–2016), Italian football midfielder
- Aquilino Boyd (1921–2004), Panamanian politician and diplomat
- Aquilino Coppini (died 1629), Italian musician and lyricist
- Aquilino López (born 1975), American baseball player
- Aquilino Pimentel (disambiguation), Filipino politicians
- Aquilino Ribeiro (1885–1963), Portuguese writer and diplomat
- Aquilino Villalba (born 1983), Paraguayan football striker

== Surname ==
- Carly Aquilino (born 1990), American stand-up comedian, actress, television host and television personality
- John C. Aquilino, United States Navy admiral
- Nicolas Aquilino (born 1953), Filipino boxer
- Thomas J. Aquilino (born 1939), Judge for the United States Court of International Trade
