= Totò Sapore e la magica storia della pizza =

- Italian soundtrack cover
- Directed by: Maurizio Forestieri
- Written by: Umberto Marino
- Screenplay by: Umberto Marino; Paolo Cananzi
- Starring: Marco Vivio; Pietra Montecorvino; Mario Merola; Lello Arena; Saba Anglana; Francesco Paolantoni
- Edited by: Michele Buri
- Music by: Edoardo Bennato; Eugenio Bennato
- Distributed by: Medusa Film; Lanterna Magica
- Release date: 19 December 2003 (Italy)
- Running time: 80 minutes
- Country: Italy
- Languages: Italian; Neapolitan

Totò Sapore e la magica storia della pizza (English: Totò Sapore and the Magical Story of Pizza) is a 2003 Italian animated film, with some dialogues made in Neapolitan, directed by Maurizio Forestieri and distributed by Medusa Film and Lanterna Magica. The film is loosely based on the novel Il cuoco prigioniero (The Prisoner Cook) by Roberto Piumini and Edoardo Porcaro.

== Plot ==
In 18th-century Naples, Antonio Salvatore "Totò" Sapore, an unemployed minstrel, always manages to cheer up the hungry with his songs about good food. He seems to be the one reason for the typically happy and euphoric Neapolitan temperament, which upsets Vesuvia, a lava witch who lives inside Mount Vesuvius. The evil witch decides to provide the poor minstrel with everything he wants and suddenly takes it away from him, thus extinguishing the very last sparkle of joy in the city.

To reach her devious goal, Vesuvia sends her clumsy, wannabe-actor servant Vincenzone to Naples, where he dresses up as an American lawyer and gives Totò a fake inheritance consisting of nothing more than four old pots. Then he scares the horse of a beautiful French girl, Confiance, so it runs in the wrong direction, thus allowing the encounter between the pretty girl and Totò who instantly falls in love with her. The couple also saves a masked hungry man called Pulcinella, who risked his life just to reach a nest of eggs on a cliff. After that the girl is called by a man's voice and goes away in a rush, while Totò and Pulcinella stick together and start cooking random stuff, only to find out that the inherited pots are alive and magical. In fact, they can turn anything into a delicious meal.

Totò decides to use this magical gift to help the needy, but Vesuvia sees to it that he is hired at Court. There he meets Mestolon, a nasty French cook who also happens to be Confiance's stepfather. Mestolon is very jealous of Totò, so he teams up with Vincenzone and boycotts a feast for the French royal family, which ends in a declaration of war against the Kingdom of Naples. Pulcinella suggests that if the King and Queen of France have declared war for a revolting luncheon, a nice meal will end the conflict. After defeating Vesuvia, Vesuvius becomes nothing more than a huge, innocuous oven. So Totò, Pulcinella, Confiance, and the pots convince the people of Naples to enter Vesuvius and invent a new meal with the few ingredients they still have. So pizza is prepared for the very first time. After eating the first pizza in history, the king of France decides to end the war.

In the end, Totò and Confiance get married, as do Fefè (the Prince of Naples) and Scorfanette (the Princess of France).

== Cast ==
- Marco Vivio as Totò Sapore
- Pietra Montecorvino as Vesuvia
- Mario Merola as Vincenzone
- Lello Arena as Pulcinella
- Saba Anglana as Confiance
- Francesco Paolantoni as the talking pots
- Rosalia Porcaro as the Queen of Naples
- Tino Cervi as the King of Naples
- Fabrizio De Flaviis as Fefè, the Prince of Naples
- Antonio Conte as the butler
- Paolo Serra as Jacques Mestolon, the cook
- Giovanni Calò as the King of France
- Angela De Matteo as the Queen of France
- Ilaria Stagni as Scorfanette, the Princess of France

== Box office ==
The film grossed about 550.000 euros.
