= John Jenkins (poet) =

John Jenkins (born 1949) is an Australian poet, non-fiction author and editor. He is the author, co-author, editor or co-editor of many books, mostly poetry and non-fiction.

== Early life and education ==
Jenkins was born in Melbourne in 1949, and grew up in the suburb of Elwood, the younger of two children. He attended Burwood Technical School and Box Hill High School.

He studied business subjects at Swinburne University of Technology.

== Career ==
Jenkins worked in educational publishing in the 1970s, then widely in commercial journalism until 2000. He has since worked as a book editor, and taught at Box Hill Institute of TAFE, University of Melbourne (School of Creative Arts) and La Trobe University.

His first book of poems, Zone of the White Wolf and Other Landscapes was published in 1974; he co-edited (with Michael Dugan) the collection of innovative short fiction, The Outback Reader (1975) while his first non-fiction title, 22 Australian Contemporary Composers, appeared in 1988. He has also collaborated with poet Ken Bolton on a number of books of poetry. In the 70s and 80s and 90s he variously carried out co-, associate- or advisory-editorial roles with the Australian journals Etymspheres, Helix, Aspect, Art and Literature, and Overland, and in the early 1980s began the small publisher, Brunswick Hills Press.

He has travelled widely, and has lived and worked in Sydney, Japan, and the UK, as well as Melbourne. His travel writing has appeared in inflight magazines, Signature Magazine (Australia) and Australian Gourmet Traveller, and he edited Travelers' Tales of Old Cuba: from Treasure Island to Mafia Den (2002).<ref">Jenkins, John (20 July 2008). "Travelers' Tales of Old Cuba". Ocean Books. Archived from the original on 1 March 2017.</ref>

His articles and reviews have appeared in Photofile, Agenda, Artstreams, The Age Monthly Review, Australian Book Review, The Australian, Overland, Southerly and other newspapers and periodicals.

His installation, The Arthur Tantrum Letters, was held at Central Street Gallery, Sydney, in 1970.

He has also collaborated widely with other artists and poets, including on various gallery installations and theatrical events. His papers are at special collections, Academy Library, University of NSW at ADFA.

In the 1980s he took part in stage shows at La Mama Theatre, Grant Street Theatre, and other venues in collaboration with musicians, and with dancers from Melbourne's Modern Dance Ensemble.

In the 1990s he took part in a multi-media installation at Adelaide's Experimental Art Foundation.

In 2010, he collaborated with other writers at Jolt Arts.

== Recognition and awards ==
Jenkins' work has featured on ABC Radio National's Airplay and Poetica series.

His 2008 collection, Growing Up With Mr Menzies was described by Jill Bamforth as "a complex, layered and original work" in the Cordite Poetry Review.

He has won or been a finalist in a number of literary awards, including:

- 2004: James Joyce Foundation Suspended Sentence Award
- 2003: Artsrush Poetry Prize
- 2004: Shortlisted, FAW Christina Stead Award
- 2006: Commended, Newcastle Poetry Prize
- 2005: Melbourne Poets Union Poetry Competition

== Bibliography ==
=== Poetry ===
- Zone of the White Wolf and Other Landscapes (Contempa, 1974) ISBN 0-86941-005-9
- Blind Spot (Makar, 1977) ISBN 0-909354-13-8
- The Inland Sea (Brunswick Hills Press, 1984) ISBN 0-9590929-0-0
- Chromatic Cargoes (Post Neo Publication, 1986)
- Airborne Dogs, With Ken Bolton (Brunswick Hills, 1988) ISBN 0-9590929-3-5
- The Ferrara Poems, With Ken Bolton (Experimental Art Foundation, 1989) ISBN 0-949836-21-4
- The Wild White Sea (Little Esther Books, 1990) ISBN 0-7316-8359-5
- Days Like Air (Modern Writing Press, 1992) ISBN 0-646-12774-8
- The Gutman Variations, With Ken Bolton (Little Esther Books, 1993) ISBN 0-646-12830-2
- The Wallah Group, With Ken Bolton (Little Esther Books, 2001) ISBN 0-9586261-6-2
- A Break in the Weather, verse novel (Modern Writing Press, 2002) ISBN 0-9581874-0-1
- Nutters Without Fetters, With Ken Bolton (PressPress, 2002) ISBN 0-9580367-0-5
- Dark River (Five Islands Press, 2003) ISBN 1-74128-021-4
- Gwendolyn Windswept, verse novel, With Ken Bolton (serialised in Otis Rush magazine)
- Poems of Relative Unlikelihood, With Ken Bolton (Little Esther Books, 2005) ISBN 0-9586261-7-0
- Growing Up With Mr Menzies (John Leonard Press, 2008) ISBN 978-0-9805269-1-2
- Poems Far and Wide (Puncher & Wattmann, 2019) ISBN 978-1-925780-12-3

=== Short fiction ===
- The Arthur Tantrum Letters, With Robert Harris, written under pseudonyms O. Der and M. Slipteal (Stitch and Time Books, 1975)

=== Non-fiction ===
- 22 Contemporary Australian Composers (NMA Publications, 1988) ISBN 0-7316-2263-4
- Arias, Recent Australian Music Theatre, With Rainer Linz (Red House Editions, 1997) ISBN 0-646-30403-8
- Travelers' tales of Old Cuba: from Treasure Island to Mafia Den, as editor (Ocean Press, 2002 & 2010) ISBN 978-0-9804292-1-3

=== Anthologies ===
- Dreamrobe Embroideries and Asparagus for Dinner, co-editor with Walter Billeter (The Paper Castle, 1974)
- Cheeries & Quartermasters, co-editor with David Miller (The Paper Castle, 1975)
- The Outback Reader, co-editor with Michael Dugan (Outback Press, 1975) ISBN 0-86888-003-5
- Soft Lounges, the 2nd Fringe Anthology, co-editor with Antonia Bruns (Fringe Network/Champion Books, 1984) ISBN 0-9592402-1-7
- Eclogues, Newcastle Poetry Prize Anthology 2007, co-editor with Martin Harrison and Jan Owen (Hunter Writers' Centre, 2007) ISBN 0-9758354-4-0
