= Ken Bolton =

Australian poet

Ken Bolton (born 1949) is an Australian poet, editor, art critic, and publisher.

== Early life and education ==
Bolton was born in Sydney in 1949. He studied fine arts at the University of Sydney, where he also tutored.

== Career ==
In the late 1970s Bolton edited the poetry magazine Magic Sam, and began the small press Sea Cruise Books with Anna Couani. Bolton's first book of poems, Four Poems, was published in 1977.

In 1982 he moved to Adelaide to work at the Experimental Art Foundation.

He edited the now defunct literary magazine Otis Rush and collaborated with Melbourne writer and poet John Jenkins on several books of poetry, verse novellas, and other works. His Selected Poems was published by Penguin in 1992.

In 2005 Wakefield Press published his monograph on the contemporary sculptor Michelle Nikou. His collection (At The Flash & At The Baci, 2006) was described by Heather Taylor-Johnson as "prov[ing] to us that Ken Bolton is a prime example of a poet breaking new ground in Australian poetry."

== Recognition and awards ==
Bolton's 2019 book Salute was shortlisted for the 2022 John Bray Poetry Award.

== Bibliography ==
=== Poetry ===
Collections and chapbooks

- Four Poems. Sydney: Sea Cruise Books. 1977. (Note: Limited edition of 300 copies.)
- Blonde & French. (Island, 1978) ISBN 0-909771-18-9
- Talking to You: Poems 1978-1981. (Rigmarole, 1983) ISBN 0-909229-25-2
- Blazing Shoes. (Open Dammit, 1984) ISBN 0-9591159-0-0
- Airborne dogs, With John Jenkins. (Brunswick Hills, 1988) ISBN 0-9590929-3-5
- The Ferrara Poems, With John Jenkins. (Experimental Art Foundation, 1989) ISBN 0-949836-21-4
- Two poems. (Experimental Art Foundation, 1990) ISBN 0-949836-26-5
- Selected Poems. (Penguin, 1992) ISBN 0-14-058688-1
- Untimely Meditations & Other Poems. (Wakefield Press, Adelaide, 1997) ISBN 1-86254-432-8
- At The Flash & At The Baci. (Wakefield Press, Adelaide, 2006) ISBN 1-86254-692-4
- The Circus. (Wakefield Press, Adelaide, 2006)
- A Whistled Bit of Bop. (Vagabond Press, Sydney, 2010) ISBN 978-0-98051-135-2
- Sly Mongoose. (Puncher & Wattmann, Sydney, 2011) ISBN 978-1-921450-30-3
- Selected Poems, 1975—2010. (Shearsman Press, Bristol, UK, 2012) ISBN 978-1-84861-209-9
- Threefer. (Puncher & Wattmann, Sydney, 2013) ISBN 978-1-9221-8646-1
- London journal London poem or "Pendant"(Vagabond Press, Sydney, 2015) ISBN 978-1-92218-161-9
- Lonnie's Lament. (Wakefield Press, Adelaide, 2017) ISBN 978-1-74305-472-7
- Species of Spaces. (Shearsman Press, Bristol, UK, 2017) ISBN 978-1-84861-576-2
- Starting at Basheer's. (Vagabond Press, Sydney, 2018) ISBN 978-1-92218-188-6
- Salute. (Puncher & Wattmann, Sydney, 2019) ISBN 978-1-92578-040-6

=== Non fiction ===
- Michelle Nikou. (Wakefield, 2005) ISBN 1-86254-676-2
- Art Writing: Art in Adelaide in the 1990s and 2000s. (CACSA, 2009) ISBN 978-1-875751-34-1
