= Roberto Piumini =

Italian writer (born 1947)

Roberto Piumini (born 14 March 1947) is an Italian writer, known particularly for his children's stories.

Born in the town of Edolo in Lombardy, Piumini graduated with a degree in pedagogy from the Università Cattolica in Milan. His first book, Il giovane che entrava nel palazzo, won the first edition of the Cento Prize for children's books, chaired by author Gianni Rodari. During his long and prolific career he has written stories and poetry for readers of all ages and has been awarded numerous prizes. He is regarded as one of Italy's "most beloved children's authors".

== Selected works ==
- Il giovane che entrava nel palazzo (1978)
- Il cuoco prigioniero (1985), on which was based the animated film Totò Sapore e la magica storia della pizza
- Il carro a sei ruote (1986)
- Lo stralisco (1987)
- Motu-Iti. L'isola dei gabbiani (1989)
- Denis del pane (1992)
- Mattia e il nonno(1993)
- Caratteristiche del bosco sacro (2000)
- Il diavolo al mulino (2001)
- La nuova Commedia di Dante (2004)
- L'amatore (2011)
- L'amorosa figura (2013)
- Tre fratelli Piumini (2013)
- I silenziosi strumenti d'amore (2014)
- Shakespeare in versi (2017)
- Alzati, Martin (2018)
- La rosa di Brod (2019)
- La barba del Manzoni (2020)
- Kintaro. Il ragazzo d'oro (2021)

His lyrics have been set to music by Enzo Rao for songs performed by Oriana Civile

=== Works in translation ===
English translations of stories told or retold by Roberto Piumini include:

- The Tortoise and the Hare, illustrated by Barbara Nascimbeni (2011)
- The Selfish Giant, illustrated by Nicoletta Costa (2011)
- Glowrushes, translated by Leah Janeczko (2022)

His stories have been translated into numerous other languages including French, German, Dutch, and Polish. His poem Is There Something in the Air?, a "playful antivirus made of words", has been translated into over 40 languages.

== Awards ==
- 1979 - Cento Prize for Il giovane che entrava nel palazzo
- 1983 - Premio Andersen Baia delle favole
- 1984 - Premio Le Palme d'oro for Storie dell'orizzonte
- 1991 - Premio letterario Piero Chiara
- 1994 - Vlag en Wimpel award for the Dutch translation of Mattia e il nonno
- 1995 - Vlag en Wimpel award for the Dutch translation of Lo stralisco
- 1995 - Premio Dessì for La rosa di Brod
- 1995 - Premio Cento for Denis del pane
- 1998 - Rattenfänger-Literaturpreis Hameln for the German translation of Motu-Iti: l'isola dei gabbiani
- 2012 - Premio Settembrini for L'amatore, (2011)
- 2014 - Premio Graziosi Terra lifetime achievement award, in particular for Mattia e il nonno
- 2020 - Premio Andersen - Trofeo Baia delle Favole for Nel regno di Bistoria
- 2020 - Premio Rodari lifetime achievement award
