= Rosetta Calavetta =

Italian voice actress (1914–1993)

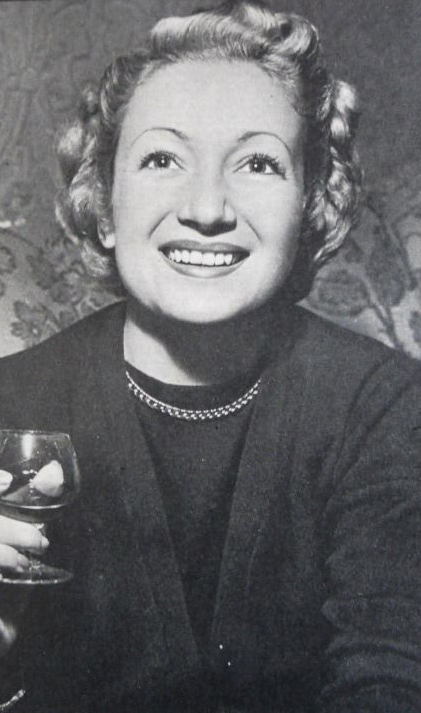
- Calavetta in 1953
- Born: 27 August 1914; Palermo, Sicily, Kingdom of Italy
- Died: 3 February 1993 (aged 78); Rome, Lazio, Italy
- Resting place: Campo Verano, Rome
- Occupations: Actress; voice actress
- Years active: 1930–1993

Rosetta Calavetta (27 August 1914 – 3 February 1993) was an Italian actress and voice actress.

== Career ==
Born in Palermo, Calavetta made her breakthrough role as a teenager in the 1930 film Before the Jury in which she had a small role. She performed on screen several times from then until 1940. She also did her share of acting for the EIAR from 1937 to 1938.

Calavetta also possessed a popular reputation as a voice dubber. She was the official Italian voice of Lana Turner, Marilyn Monroe and Doris Day. Other actresses she dubbed included Lois Maxwell, Eleanor Parker, Susan Hayward, Dorothy Lamour, Ava Gardner, Veronica Lake, Kim Novak, Deanna Durbin, Glynis Johns, Jean Arthur, Shirley MacLaine, Angela Lansbury, Janet Leigh, June Allyson, Lucille Ball, Zsa Zsa Gábor and Ann Sheridan. She also dubbed Italian actresses which include Gina Lollobrigida, Antonella Lualdi, María Mercader, Silvana Pampanini and Milly Vitale.

In Calavetta's Italian dubbed animated roles, she provided the speaking voice of Snow White in Snow White and the Seven Dwarfs as well as Cruella de Vil in One Hundred and One Dalmatians, Darling in Lady and the Tramp and Kanga in Winnie the Pooh and the Honey Tree and Winnie the Pooh and the Blustery Day.

== Filmography ==
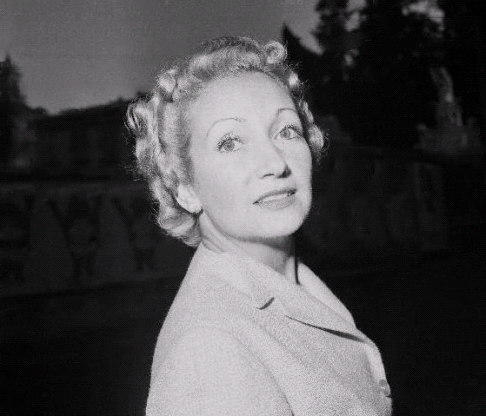
Calavetta in the 1950s

=== Cinema ===
- Before the Jury (1930)
- The Blue Fleet (1932)
- The Ambassador (1936)
- Marionette (1939)
- Vento di milioni (1940)

== Dubbing roles ==
=== Animation ===
- Snow White in Snow White and the Seven Dwarfs
- Cruella de Vil in One Hundred and One Dalmatians
- Darling in Lady and the Tramp
- Drizella in Cinderella
- Marionette in Pinocchio
- Kanga in Winnie the Pooh and the Honey Tree, Winnie the Pooh and the Blustery Day
- Merlina in Il nano e la strega

=== Live action ===
- Rosemary Howard in Bachelor in Paradise
- Milady, Countess de Winter in The Three Musketeers
- Maggie Colby in The Lady Takes a Flyer
- Shelia Cabot in Portrait in Black
- Beatrix Emery in Dr. Jekyll and Mr. Hyde
- Elsa Keller in The Sea Chase
- Melanie Flood in Who's Got the Action?
- Cora Smith in The Postman Always Rings Twice
- Bunny Smith in Week-End at the Waldorf
- Peggy Evans in Slightly Dangerous
- Sugar "Kane" Kowalczyk in Some Like It Hot
- Pola Debevoise in How to Marry a Millionaire
- Peggy in Clash by Night
- Chérie in Bus Stop
- Rose Loomis in Niagara
- Roslyn Tabor in The Misfits
- Kay Weston in River of No Return
- Elsie Marina in The Prince and the Showgirl
- Amanda Dell in Let's Make Love
- Grunion's Client in Love Happy
- Nanette Carter in Tea for Two
- Laurie Tuttle in Young at Heart
- Melinda Howard in Lullaby of Broadway
- Jan Morrow in Pillow Talk
- Beverly Boyer in The Thrill of It All
- Jo Jordan in Young Man with a Horn
- Cathy Timberlake in That Touch of Mink
- Calamity Jane in Calamity Jane
- Carol Templeton in Lover Come Back
- Jane Osgood in It Happened to Jane
- Winifred Banks in Mary Poppins
- Marion Crane in Psycho
- Miss Moneypenny in Dr. No, From Russia with Love, Thunderball, You Only Live Twice, On Her Majesty's Secret Service
- Clarissa Saunders in Mr. Smith Goes to Washington
- Baroness Bomburst in Chitty Chitty Bang Bang
- Ilonka Tolnay in Spring Parade
