= Michael Dugan (poet) =

Australian poet

Michael Dugan (1947 – 16 March 2006) was an Australian poet, children's writer, and editor.

In 1968, he first published his own small poetry magazine, Crosscurrents, from the Melbourne suburb of Canterbury. He created the King Hippo Poetry Band who performed folk-rock versions of well-known poems. With Phillip Edmonds and Robert Kenny, he was involved in the development of Contempa Publications.

In the 1970s, he worked as a consultant to the publisher Jacaranda Press, and was the editor of The Australian Library News Furthermore, Dugan co-founded and edited Bookmark. In the 1980s, he was a consultant and an editor for the Australian Institute of Multicultural Affairs. He worked as poetry editor of Overland magazine for many years. He served as vice-president of the Victorian Fellowship of Australian Writers. He has also written plays and scripts for radio.

Along with his works in children's literature, Dugan has an extensive background in Australian History. He has written numerous historical textbooks, published by Macmillan Education Australia and others.

== His works ==
- Missing People (1970)
- The Drunken Tram : Six young Melbourne poets (1972)
- Clouds (1975)
- The Outback Reader (1975), with John Jenkins
- Nonsense Places (1976)
- Dragon's Breath (1978)
- Dingo Boy (1980)
- Melissa's Ghost (1986), illustrated by Elizabeth Honey
- The Maltese Connection (1988)
- The Highjacked Bathtub (1988)
- The Wombat's Party (1990)
- To a Trainee Accountant (2002)
- Childmemory
- Vietnam War (2000)
- Aboriginal Australia (1998)
- Bushrangers (1978)
- Boer War (2000)
- Korean War (2000)
- Children In Wartime (1997)
- World War II (2000)
- World War I (2000)
