= Il nano e la strega =

- US theatrical release poster.
- Zizi Panpan (France, Switzerland); King Dick (UK, US)
- Directed by: Gibba
- Written by: Giorgio Terzi; Giovanni Magheri; Claudio Monti; Oreste Lionello; Enrico Bomba
- Produced by: Jenny Gérard; Michel Gast; Claudio Monti
- Starring: Roger Carel; Paule Emanuele; Georges Aminel; Gabriel Cattand; Rosetta Calavetta; Germana Dominici; Vittorio Stagni; Carlo Romano; Arturo Dominici; Ferdinando Gazzolo
- Cinematography: Claudio De Angeli
- Edited by: Massimo Antonelli
- Music by: Coriolano Gori
- Production companies: Monti Film (Roma, Italy); S.N.D. (Paris, France)
- Distributed by: Europa filmsa locarno. (France, Switzerland); Alpha D.C. (Italy). Eagle Films LTD in 1979 (UK)
- Release dates: 6 March 1975 (France); 31 July 1975 (Italy)
- Running time: 79 minutes (Italian version) 67 minutes (English Verison)
- Countries: Italy; France
- Languages: French; Italian; English

Il nano e la strega (Translation: The dwarf and the witch, French title: Zizi PanPan, English title: King Dick) is a 1975 Italian-French adult animated film directed by Gibba (although credited to Gioacchino Libratti) and was a co-production between Monti Film (Rome) and S.N.D. (Paris).

== Plot ==
A tyrannical King, Charles the Impotent, has taken over the Kingdom. During Charles's terrible reign, Master Limpcock is having a difficult sex life with his wife, Erotica. Erotica suggests a potion to Limpcock to cure his erectile dysfunction. She is soon left alone,and invites a young servant man to have sex with her. The two are being watched through the keyhole by Little Dick (the "King Dick" of the title), a young servant dwarf, who has been instructed by Limpcock to send a message to Nymphomania, a sexually-inadequate witch, who concocts a spell that will hopefully make herself beautiful again.

Nymphomania's Crystal Ball comes to terms of helping her to regain her beauty, only if she receives sixty-nine orgasms during sexual intercourse. She decides to test this out on Little Dick when he arrives, and is accompanied by Aphrodisiac, a wisecracking talking red frog (initially used as one of Nymphomania's ingredients), who helps her to keep track of the number of orgasms she receives each time she has sex. Once Little Dick is knocked out, Nymphomania transforms into a beautiful woman, but returns to her original form, as she has not received enough orgasms to fully break the spell.

She goes to see Master Limpcock, and makes a deal that she can help cure his impotence, but only on one condition: that she keeps Little Dick all for herself. Limpcock agrees, and the well-endowed dwarf, attempting to escape from Nymphomania's clutches and from the equally desperate Erotica, successfully escapes, but runs into trouble with some coachmen. He soon finds a job as a stablehand at the town's circus, cleaning an elephant, who frequently flatulates and defecates on people. Little Dick soon starts to miss Nymphomania, as he would rather be with her than be at the circus.

Meanwhile, after a few failed attempts, Aphrodisiac manages to get the Crystal Ball to signal again by consuming some fireflies, and he helps Nymphomania and Little Dick to reunite, whilst also curing the King's impotence. She also casts acrobatic spells on Little Dick, which causes him to grow erections that reach extreme lengths. This amazes the circus crowd, and an obese female circus participant, Miss Lulu Lashers, a tightrope walker, runs after the little dwarf so she can have sex with him. To prevent this from happening, Nymphomania races to rescue Little Dick, followed by Aphrodisiac with the Crystal Ball.

She reunites with Little Dick, and successfully has more sexual intercourse with him. Like last time, she turns into a beautiful woman for a short period of time, unbeknownst by Little Dick, due to being unconscious from the exhaustion of having rough sex with her. The crowd, appalled by Nymphomania's ugliness, boo away the witch, before Lulu soon causes the whole circus to collapse. Nymphomania then tries to catch Little Dick, who had just started to escape from the circus, for more sex. They arrive at a cemetery, and Little Dick falls into a large tomb.

He then has a nightmare about him being led to a grand hall where an orgy session has been held, with Limpcock and Erotica being among the people attending. He later arrives at an olympics stadium where a race has been held. He unintentionally races, finishes first, and is rewarded. The prize-giver is later revealed to be Nymphomania, who leads the dwarf to the dungeon to have more intercourse. He starts having nasty thoughts about being surrounded by multiple Nymphomanias, and then encounters a snake charmer, who extends Little Dick's penis, which gets run over by a gladiator cart.

Little Dick then wakes up, and once again finds himself having more sexual intercourse with Nymphomania before escaping from her again. He then finds himself in a forest where he encounters the legendary Robin Hood and his Merry Men, who rescue him from a wild boar, which they eat during a camping evening. During that evening, Robin Hood tells him about Charles the Impotent, who instructed Fartface, a villainous witch, to murder Robin Hood's brother-in-law King Richard (Big Dick) and his son on Friday the 13th to end the Royal Line, so that Charles can become King of England.

Robin Hood decides to start a revolution against the tyrannical King, but he does not have a bell to sound the alarm, so he insists that Little Dick steals one from the church, The Holy Passion. Little Dick disguises as a little girl to confess sins, and is led to a school of nuns. Aphrodisiac hears all of this, and informs Nymphomania, who soon spots the dwarf, and sneaks into the church cellar through a dungeon and into a workshop where two Blacksmiths invented a special chastity belt, which they decide to test on Nymphomania when she immediately arrives. Nymphomania spots Little Dick being treated by the Mother Superior (head of the nuns), who – now aware of the dwarf's disguise – stiffens Little Dick's penis using a formula. Nymphomania successfully breaks off the chastity belt when she and Little Dick continue to have sex.

Nymphomania, Aphrodisiac and Little Dick escape, and they ring the bells of the church, much to the delight of Robin Hood and the Merry Men, who celebrate with a feast, and decide to hold the Revolution till the following day. Little Dick escapes Nymphomania. He joins the celebration, gets drunk, and has more intercourse with her once she catches up.

The day of the revolution against Charles arrives, and Robin Hood becomes startled when he hears that Charles has declared a law against fornication. The famous outlaw forms a mob. Meanwhile, after escaping (this time, unintentionally) yet again from Nymphomania, he crashes into Master Limpcock's castle. Limpcock, much obliged to see Little Dick, congratulates the young dwarf for helping to cure his impotence, and reveals the note he had to send to Nymphomania earlier. He explains that now Little Dick has reached twenty years old, he is an eligible heir to the throne, and that Nymphomania is the daughter of FartFace, who was cursed by an evil wizard.

Robin Hood and the Merry Men defeat Charles, and discover that Little Dick is part of the Royal Line through the birthmark on his left buttock, which was exposed when he and Nymphomania were having sex in a nearby stable.

Nymphomania eventually reaches her sixty-ninth orgasm, she transforms into her beautiful form again, this time without changing back, and Little Dick becomes a handsome prince. The two lovers get married, but on their wedding night, they learn that Prince Dick has now been given the same erectile dysfunction predicament as Master Limpcock. Nymphomania's Crystal Ball rectifies this, but explains that they must sacrifice their beauty, and return to their original forms. They agree, and being much more accepting of each other's appearances, have a much more positive sex life. They live happily ever after and have many well-endowed children.

== Production ==
The project emerged in the early 1970s, directly inspired by the international success of Ralph Bakshi's Fritz the Cat, the first animated feature to receive an X rating in the United States. Hoping to capitalize on this trend, Italian producer Claudio Monti financed a feature-length adult cartoon that could compete in the new market for erotic animation. The film's production began in 1973 under severe financial constraints. Monti secured a French co-producer and pushed the team to present a segment at Cannes, but the animation was completed hastily and underfunded. Gibba later recalled that the crew worked "in extreme economy and without real compensation", and that Monti went so far as to pawn his wife's jewelry to keep the production alive. Narratively, the film combined elements from an earlier unproduced project by Gibba (Eroicomicon, 1971) with bawdy parody. The plot follows Pipolo, a dwarf who is secretly a prince under enchantment, and Merlina, a witch who is likewise a cursed princess. The curse can only be broken if they copulate one hundred times, leading to a series of erotic misadventures across varied settings (the circus, Ancient Rome, a convent, and a forest). Much of the humor relied on crude gags and sexual innuendo, drawing from Italy's popular pornographic comics of the era Before its release, the film faced significant censorship hurdles. In December 1974, Italy's censorship board denied approval, labeling it "contrary to public decency." After an appeal, distributors were required to cut over forty meters of footage, including explicit sexual sequences, before it was granted release with an adults-only rating in February 1975. Even after censorship approval, the film was temporarily seized in March by prosecutors in Latina, delaying distribution for several weeks Internationally, the film was released under different titles: Zizi Pan Pan in France, King Dick in the United States, and Zizi der Größte in Germany.

Promotional materials imitated those of Fritz the Cat, marketing the film as "the first Italian porn cartoon" and highlighting its irreverence. However, both the film's critical and commercial reception were poor. Critics derided the film as crude and technically subpar, and Gibba himself later disowned it, calling it an "unclassifiable product, badly drawn in haste and for little pay". The film's failure had lasting effects. Planned follow-up projects in the erotic animation genre, such as Faust Temptation, were abandoned, and Il nano e la strega became a cautionary example of Italy's missed opportunity to establish a sustainable tradition of adult animated features. Gibba, who had accepted the project reluctantly, returned to commercial work and occasional animation commissions, distancing himself from the Adult Animation experiment.

== Voice cast ==
Character	Original	English
Merlina (witch)	Rosetta Calavetta	Unknown
Merlina (woman)	Germana Dominici	Unknown
Pipolo	Vittorio Stagni	Unknown
Magozio	Carlo Romano	Unknown
The Notary	Arturo Dominici	Unknown
Notary's Wife	Vittoria Febbi	Unknown
Master of the Circus	Gianfranco Bellini	Unknown
Exhibitionist Chubby	Lydia Simoneschi	Unknown
Mother Superior	Maria Saccenti	Unknown
Brother of the Chastity Belt	Bruno Persa	Unknown
King's Advisor	Bruno Persa	Unknown
Old Lady Fainting	Franca Dominici	Unknown
Narrator	Nando Gazzolo	Unknown

French dub: Roger Carel Georges Aminel Gabriel Cattand Paule Emanuele

== Release ==
Although the film was originally made in Italian, the French-language version of the film was released in France first on March 6, 1975. The Italian-language version was then released in Italy on July 31st,1975. When the film went to the UK the BBFC Rejected it in 29th November 1977 using the UK Dub which was dubbed from a French print Under 67mins. On 19th December 1978 Barry Jacobs (who own Eagle films Ltd) took the film back to the To the BBFC And This Time they Did Several cuts and Passed it with a X Certificate under the running time of 66mins and Distributed by Eagle Films Ltd, in 8th March 1979 The Film Went to Cinemas, in 1981 Intervision Video released it As a Gatefold Carton using the Cinema Print Same with the 1986 AVR Home Entertainment. The director for the English Dub was Giorgio Terzi Who did the Witten the Original Italiain version. the Cast are unknown however on the 1977 Rejected 67mins print did have End credits but Some Versions of it the credits are in French. 2 other English versions, the second version was on the VHS Dirty Little Adult Cartoons, Vol. 2, In German with Dutch subtitles, the dubbing was done in-house, most of which is improvised and doesn't match the mouth movements as well as the first dub, the third version was a 1987 porn VHS called Sheena in Wonderland, which featured the same version as the Original English dub except with the female lead commenting on the film throughout, with scenes of the host having sex with other men throughout. The film recived very small amout of DVD releases in Australia, UK, Germany and Spain

The film was not received well when it came out in cinemas. It was a Box-office bomb lor_ (former editor of Motion Picture department of Variety Newspaper) called the film "Very Poor Film, Not Well-Done Animation” although, it did gain a Mid Cult following in the UK after being released on VHS.
