= Ilaria Stagni =

Italian voice actress (born 1967)

- Born: 4 October 1957 (age 68); Milan, Italy
- Occupations: Actress; voice actress; dialogue writer; dubbing director
- Years active: 1985–present
- Spouse: Anton Giulio Castagna (divorced)
- Children: Jacopo Castagna
- Parents: Vittorio Stagni (father); Lorenza Biella (mother)

Ilaria Stagni (born 10 November 1967) is an Italian actress and voice actress.

== Biography ==
Ilaria Stagni is born in Milan on 10 November 1967 and the daughter of actors Vittorio Stagni and Lorenza Biella (born on 1945), Stagni began her career in the 1980s. She has acted in theatre, cinema, and television. Stagni is typically known for her dubbing of male children, being the official Italian voice for Bart Simpson in The Simpsons from 1991 until 2012 (when she was replaced by Gaia Bolognesi) and among the most popular characters she dubbed are Macaulay Culkin as Kevin McCallister in Home Alone and Barret Oliver as Bastian Balthazar Bux in The Neverending Story. In her animated roles, Stagni voiced Jessie in the Toy Story franchise, the title character in Pocahontas, Terk in Tarzan and Jerry in Tom and Jerry: The Movie.

Among the actresses Stagni has dubbed there are Jennifer Lopez, Winona Ryder, Eva Longoria, Charlize Theron, Lauren Graham, Mira Sorvino, Jessica Biel, Samantha Morton and more.

=== Personal life ===
Stagni is the ex-wife of the late dubbing director Anton Giulio Castagna. They have one son, Jacopo, who is a voice actor.

== Filmography ==
- Physical Jerks (1997)
- Una donna per amico – TV series, 1 episode (1998)
- The House of Chicken (2001)
- Johan Padan a la descoverta de le Americhe (2001) - voice
- Stiamo bene insieme – TV series, 8 episodes (2002)
- Lo zio d'America – TV series (2002)
- Totò Sapore e la magica storia della pizza (2003) - voice
- Attenti a quei tre – TV miniseries (2004)
- Il naso – short film (2006)
- La zampata - TV show (2023)

== Dubbing roles ==
=== Animation ===
- Bart Simpson and Simon Woosterfield in The Simpsons (seasons 1-22), Bart Simpson in The Simpsons Movie, Family Guy
- Pocahontas in Pocahontas, Pocahontas II: Journey to a New World, Ralph Breaks the Internet
- Jessie in Toy Story 2, Toy Story 3, Toy Story 4, Toy Story of Terror!, Hawaiian Vacation, Small Fry, Partysaurus Rex
- Terk in Tarzan, Tarzan II, Tarzan & Jane, The Legend of Tarzan
- Penny Proud in The Proud Family, The Proud Family Movie, The Proud Family: Louder and Prouder
- Slappy Squirrel in Animaniacs, Wakko's Wish
- Chiriko and Soi in Fushigi Yûgi
- Max and Ruby in Max & Ruby
- Bertie and Nerdluck Bupkus in Space Jam
- Mihail and Julia in Lupin the 3rd Part III
- Azteca in Antz
- Jerry in Tom and Jerry: The Movie
- Honker Muddlefoot in Darkwing Duck
- Chel in The Road to El Dorado
- Baby Bear in Shrek
- Birdbrain Mary in Treasure Planet
- Bridget in An American Tail
- Julian Clifton in Postman Pat
- Bubbles and Misty in Ice Age: Collision Course
- Babs in Chicken Run
- Gazelle in Zootopia
- Jack-Jack Parr in Incredibles 2
- Daniela Paguro in Luca
- Michelle in ChalkZone

=== Live action ===
- Various roles in 7th Heaven, The Bold and the Beautiful
- Kevin McCallister in Home Alone, Home Alone 2: Lost in New York
- Mary Sue and Chucky Lee Torkelson in The Torkelsons
- Holly and Audrey Penney in Ellen (TV series)
- Jamie Powell and Guendolyn Pierce in Charles in Charge
- Basketball player in Space Jam
- Mary Fiore in The Wedding Planner
- Paulina in Shall We Dance?
- Charlie Cantilini in Monster-in-Law
- Jean Gilkyson in An Unfinished Life
- Maya Vargas in Second Act
- Ramona Vega in Hustlers
- Gabrielle Solis in Desperate Housewives
- Jill Marin in The Sentinel
- Consuelo Cantrow in The Heartbreak Kid
- Kate Spencer in Over Her Dead Body
- Celeste Martin in The Baytown Outlaws
- Eva Longoria in In a World...
- Grace in Dog Days
- Bastian Balthazar Bux in The Neverending Story
- Elena Márquez in Dora and the Lost City of Gold
- Sue in Bad Santa
- Claire Fletcher in The Pacifier
- Joan Baxter in Evan Almighty
- Luann Mitchler in A Merry Friggin' Christmas
- Jill Young in Mighty Joe Young
- Laura Kensington in The Curse of the Jade Scorpion
- Jill Price-Grey in Weeds
- Nola Rice in Match Point
- Sondra Pransky in Scoop
- Kay Lake in The Black Dahlia
- Cristina in Vicky Cristina Barcelona
- The Female in Under the Skin
- Molly in Chef
- Lucy Miller in Lucy
- DeeAnna Moran in Hail, Caesar!
- Corky in Night on Earth
- Nola in Celebrity
- Charlotte Fielding in Autumn in New York
- Nicola Anders in Simone
- Siri Taylor in The Darwin Awards
- Gillian De Raisx in Sex and Death 101
- Nyota Uhura in Star Trek, Star Trek Into Darkness, Star Trek Beyond
- Peter Pan in Finding Neverland
- Vada Sultenfuss in My Girl
- Carolina in Once Upon a Time in Mexico
- Frida Kahlo in Frida
- Francesca Giggles in Spy Kids 3-D: Game Over
- Elena Sánchez in Savages
- Salma Hayek in Muppets Most Wanted
- Moaning Myrtle in Harry Potter and the Chamber of Secrets
- Moaning Myrtle in Harry Potter and the Goblet of Fire
- Leslie / Linda Ash in Mighty Aphrodite
- Ruth Wheldon in Reservation Road
- Amy Benic in At First Sight
- Romy White in Romy and Michele's High School Reunion
- Wendy Porter in Like Dandelion Dust
- Connie James in The Hurt Locker
- Éowyn in The Lord of the Rings: The Two Towers, The Lord of the Rings: The Return of the King
- Penny Pacino in Confessions of a Dangerous Mind
- Billie Offer in Lucky You
- Rosie Goode in Everybody's Fine
- Ingrid Cortez in Spy Kids, Spy Kids 2: The Island of Lost Dreams
- Larita Whittaker in Easy Virtue
- Sophie von Teschen in The Illusionist
- Catherine in Nightwatch
- Katherine "Kissin' Kate" Barlow in Holes
- Alice Ayres in Closer
- Inés Bilbatúa / Alicia in Goya's Ghosts
- Molly Mahoney in Mr. Magorium's Wonder Emporium
- Sabrina in City of Ghosts
- Briseis in Troy
- Helen Harris in Bridesmaids

=== Video games ===
- Bart Simpson in The Simpsons Game
