= Agnes Sassoon =

British journalist

- Born: Agnes Lichtschein; 1933; Vylok, Czechoslovakia
- Died: 11 January 2020 (aged 86–87); London, United Kingdom
- Occupations: Author, journalist, Holocaust survivor
- Known for: Holocaust survivor and educator
- Notable work: How My Spirit Survived

Agnes Sassoon (née Lichtschein; 1933 – 11 January 2020) was a Czechoslovak-born British author, journalist, and Holocaust survivor. Born in Czechoslovakia, she survived internment in Nazi concentration camps as a child during World War II. After the war, she became an advocate for Holocaust education and wrote about her experiences.

== Early life ==
Agnes Lichtschein was born in 1933 in Vylok, Czechoslovakia (now Ukraine). Her father, Simon Lichtschein (1895–1969), was a teacher, and her mother, Sarika (1903–1980), was a homemaker. She had an older brother, Oskar.

Sassoon recalled attending a German nursery school in Pressburg (Bratislava) where, around the age of five and a half, she witnessed Adolf Hitler's visit near the Statue of Masaryk in 1938. She remembered being dressed in a traditional dirndl, and of hearing shouts of "Jude" (Jew), which she later understood meant the removal of Jewish children from the schools.

After leaving the German nursery school, she attended a Jewish-German school in Bratislava where she learned German, Czech, and Hungarian. Due to increasing antisemitism and her father's inability to find stable teaching work, the family faced economic hardship. Sassoon was sent to live with her maternal grandparents in a village to ensure she had enough to eat.

In 1939, the family moved to Budapest, Hungary. Sassoon's father helped Jewish and Gentile refugees. They lived in a designated "yellow star house" with restricted movement. Sassoon remembered her mother sewing the yellow star onto her coat. Despite the risks, her father assisted people.

== Holocaust ==
In October 1944, at the age of 11, Sassoon was arrested during a raid on her Jewish school in Budapest by members of the Arrow Cross Party, Hungary's Nazi-aligned faction. She was deported to the Dachau concentration camp. She received assistance from an experienced inmate. Later, she was transferred to Bergen-Belsen, where she remained until the camp's liberation in April 1945. She was shot by a guard while marching to Bergen-Belsen in 1945 but was rescued by German and French POWs. She was taken to Bergen-Belsen for treatment and interned there.

== Post-war life, career and advocacy ==
After the war, Sassoon was rescued from a pile of corpses. She was taken in by the mayor of Hanover until her parents found her. She then moved between Budapest, Prague, and Bratislava. Her brother was shot in the Danube by Arrow Cross members. Later, she worked for an underground Zionist organisation supporting the emigration of European Jews to Israel.

In 1950, Sassoon emigrated to Israel. She later married Charles Sassoon, a member of the prominent Sassoon family. She had two sons, Robert and Saul, and worked as a journalist. In 1958, she moved to London with her husband.

Sassoon became a fashion journalist and organized fashion shows and charity events in London. However, she also dedicated much of her life to Holocaust education and remembrance. She wrote a memoir about her experiences titled Agnes: How My Spirit Survived.

Throughout her life, Sassoon visited schools in Germany, Britain, and Israel to share her story and educate young people about the Holocaust. In May 2015, she was one of 133 survivors who participated in commemorations marking the 70th anniversary of the liberation of the Dachau concentration camp. Agnes Sassoon died in London on 11 January 2020 at the age of 86.
