= Anna Sarfatti =

Italian writer of children's books (born 1950)

Anna Sarfatti (born 1950) is an Italian writer of children's books.

== Biography ==
Sarfatti was born in Florence. She has taught in nursery and primary school for many years. Some of her books have been written in order to help children become conscious of their rights and duties as citizens. The one which has become the most popular in schools is La Costituzione raccontata ai bambini.

Also Fulmine un cane coraggioso, a tale of a dog and his owner during the Resistance in Italy, and L'albero della memoria, the story of a Jewish child and his family during the Fascist regime in Italy (1938–1945), have found a large audience among teachers and school children. Both were written with the historian Michele Sarfatti.

Anna Sarfatti has been in contact with the "Anna Meyer" Children's Hospital in Florence, collaborating in their project to make children feel happier in hospital and not being frightened of their health problems (see the book Guai a chi mi chiama passerotto! I diritti dei bambini in ospedale).

Two short stories for adults have been published in Decameron 2013, published by Felici 2013.

== Selected works ==
- Capitombolo sulla terra, Giunti, 1998 and 2007
- Pecorino Profumino, Giunti 2001 (award Bitritto 2002)
- Ri – trattini, Giunti 2003
- Il galletto Maciste, Giunti 2004 (award Verghereto 2005)
- Guai a chi mi chiama passerotto! I diritti dei bambini in ospedale, Fatatrac 2004 (award Salute Apuane 2005–2006)
- Il Rubagiocattoli, Giunti 2005 and 2013
- Una trappola per Maciste, Giunti 2006
- La Costituzione raccontata ai bambini, Milan: Mondadori 2006 (award Colette Rosselli 2009)
- Il farfallo innamorato, Giunti 2007
- 9 titoli nella collana La Calamitica terza E, EDT Giralangolo, (scritta con Barbara Pumhösel)
- 9 titoli nella collana Oscar dove sei?, EDT Giralangolo
- Viva la squola alè alè, Giunti 2008
- Quante tante donne, Mondadori 2008
- Sei Stato tu? La Costituzione attraverso le domande dei bambini (with coauthor Gherardo Colombo), Salani 2009
- Chiama il diritto, risponde il dovere, Mondadori 2009
- Ziri sulla luna, Giunti Progetti Educativi 2009
- La scuola va a rotoli, Mondadori 2011
- Fulmine, un cane coraggioso. La Resistenza raccontata ai bambini, Mondadori 2011 (with coauthor Michele Sarfatti)
- Educare alla legalità. Suggerimenti pratici e non-per genitori e insegnanti, Salani 2011 (with coauthor Gherardo Colombo)
- I bambini non vogliono il pizzo. La scuola "Giovanni Falcone and Paolo Borsellino", Mondadori 2012
- L'albero della memoria. La Shoah raccontata ai bambini, Mondadori 2013 (with coauthor Michele Sarfatti)
- Cuore mio e La rete in Decameron 2013, Felici Editore 2013
- L’isola delle regole, Mondadori 2014
- Il pianeta nel piatto. Il diritto all’alimentazione raccontato ai bambini (with coauthor Paolo Sarfatti), Mondadori 2015
- Che differenza c’è tra un libro e un bambino?, Nord-Sud 2015
- Tutti a scuola, Giunti 2015
- Diversi in versi, Giunti 2015
- Come stai, fiume?, Giunti 2015
- Guai a chi mi chiama passerotto!, Giunti 2015
- Sempre le regole!, Giunti 2016
- Se vuoi la pace, Giunti 2016
- A braccia aperte. Storie di bambini migranti, Mondadori 2016 (AA.VV.)
- Il regno degli errori, Mondadori 2016
- Sono Stato io! Una Costituzione pensata dai bambini, Salani 2016 (with coauthors Gherardo Colombo and Licia Di Blasi)

== Translations ==
Anna Sarfatti has also concentrated her work on Theodor Seuss Geisel, known as Dr. Seuss, translating into Italian 10 of his books, published by Giunti Editore:

- C'è un mostrino nel taschino! (There's a Wocket in My Pocket)
- L'uovo di Ortone (Horton Hatches the Egg)
- Ortone e i piccoli Chi (Horton Hears a Who!)
- Prosciutto e uova verdi (Green Eggs and Ham)
- Gli Snicci e altre storie (The Sneetches and Other Stories)
- La battaglia del burro (The Butter Battle Book)
- Il gatto e il cappello matto (The Cat in the Hat)
- Il ritorno del gatto col cappello (The Cat in the Hat Comes Back)
- Il paese di Solla Sulla (I Had Trouble in Getting to Solla Sollew)
- Il Lorax (The Lorax)
- Oh quante cose vedrai! (Oh, the places you'll go!)

Other translations:

- I gatti di Copenhagen (The Cats of Copenhagen) by James Joyce, Giunti 2012
- Re Valdo e il Drago (King Jack and the Dragon) by Peter Bently e Helen Oxenbury, Il Castoro 2015
