= Angela Nanetti =

Italian writer (born 1942)

Angela Nanetti is an Italian writer. She was awarded the Baltvilks International Prize in Children’s Literature and Book Art, for the book My Grandfather was a Cherry Tree in 2019. The book was made into an animated short film by directors Olga Poliektova and Tatiana Poliektova in 2015.
