= Maria Messina =

Italian writer (1887-1944)

- Born: 14 March 1887; Alimena, Palermo, Sicily, Italy
- Died: 19 January 1944 (aged 56); Pistoia, Tuscany, Italy
- Writing career
- Years active: 1909–1928
- Subject: Sicilian women

Maria Messina (14 March 1887 – 19 January 1944) was an Italian writer.

== Biography ==
Maria was born in Alimena, in the province of Palermo, the daughter of school inspector Gaetano Messina and Gaetana Valenza Trajna, descendant of a baronial family of Prizzi. She grew up in Messina, where she spent an isolated childhood with her parents and brothers. During adolescence, she travelled a lot through the Centre and South of Italy because of her father's continual relocations, until in 1911 her family settled in Naples. Maria Messina was self-educated and was consequently encouraged by her older brother to begin a career as a writer.

When she was twenty-two, she began an intense correspondence with Giovanni Verga. Between 1909 and 1921, she published a series of short stories. Thanks to Verga's support, she also had a novella, Luciuzza, published in 1914 in a literary magazine, Nuova Antologia. Another one, La Mèrica, appeared in 1912 in La Donna and won the Gold Medal prize.

She carried on intense correspondence with various personalities of the time, for example, with the Florentine publisher Enrico Bemporad, with the Sicilian poet and critic Alessio Di Giovanni, and especially the Catanese writer Giovanni Verga. Altogether, Maria Messina produced various collections of novellas, five novels, and a selection of children's literature, which gave her notable prestige. Of a certain worth were her various contributions in magazines, and her article was included in a 1929 anthology, Studi verghiani, edited by Lina Perroni. In 1928, her last novel L'amore negato came out, while the multiple sclerosis that she had been diagnosed with at the age of twenty was developing complications. She died of this disease in Pistoia in 1944.

She lived for many years in Mistretta, a small town in the province of Messina, in the heart of the Nebrodi Mountains, where many of her stories are set. Her mortal remains, along with those of her mother, were transferred on April 24, 2009, to Mistretta, considered her second hometown. Maria Messina was made an "honorary citizen" of the ancient "capital" of the Nebrodi.

Her niece Annie Messina (1910–1996), daughter of Maria's brother Salvatore, was a writer too.

== Writing ==
Messina's writing concentrates above all on Sicilian culture and, as principal themes, the isolation and oppression of young Sicilian women. Moreover, her writing is focused on the domination and submission inherent in the emotional relationships between men and women. What is more, one of her best-known novels, La casa nel vicolo, marked a turning point in Messina's writing, toward the use of psychological conditions. In her narration, Messina depicted the oppression of women as inevitable and cyclic, and, because of this, some think that she was not a feminist. Nevertheless, the women she depicted were the representation of powerful declarations of an attitude of challenge.

== Reception ==
Maria Messina is among the important women writers in the history of Italian literature of the early 20th century. So she is counted in the research project The Women Authors of Italian Literature.

After her premature death, Maria Messina's name slowly and gradually started to be forgotten, and her books started going out of print. Only in 1980 she was rediscovered by Leonardo Sciascia, so that many of her works were republished by Sellerio from 1981 until 2009. Then in 2017 her works have returned to bookstores thanks to Salvatore Asaro, who had her novels Alla deriva, with a preface by the writer Elena Stancanelli, Le pause della vita, Primavera senza sole and Un fiore che non fiorì reprinted by the publisher Edizioni Croce.

From 1986, her works began to be translated into French, German, English and Spanish.

The Progetto Mistretta cultural association founded the Maria Messina Prize for literature in her honour, through its journal Il Centro Storico, in 2003.

== Works ==
=== Novellas ===
- Pettini fini e altre novelle, Palermo: Sandron, 1909; Palermo: Sellerio, 1996.
- Piccoli gorghi, Palermo: Sandron, 1911; Palermo: Sellerio, 1988.
- Le briciole del destino, Milan: Treves, 1918; Palermo: Sellerio, 1996.
- II guinzaglio, Milan: Treves, 1921; Palermo: Sellerio, 1996.
- Personcine, Milan: A. Vallardi, 1921; Palermo: Sellerio, 1998.
- Ragazze siciliane, Florence: Le Monnier, 1921; Palermo: Sellerio, 1997.
- Casa paterna (1944), Palermo: Sellerio, 1981 (with a note by Leonardo Sciascia).
- Gente che passa, Palermo: Sellerio, 1989.
- Dopo l'inverno, edited by Roswitha Schoell-Dombrowsky, Palermo: Sellerio, 1998.

=== Novels ===
- Alla deriva, Milan: Treves, 1920; preface by Elena Stancanelli, Rome: Edizioni Croce, 2017.
- Primavera senza sole, Naples: Giannini, 1920; Rome: Edizioni Croce, 2017, introduced and edited by Salvatore Asaro.
- La casa nel vicolo, Milan: Treves, 1921; Palermo: Sellerio, 1982.
- Un fiore che non fiorì, Milan: Treves, 1923; Rome: Edizioni Croce, 2017, prefaced and edited by Salvatore Ferlita, bio-bibliographic chronology by Salvatore Asaro.
- Le pause della vita, Milan: Treves, 1926; Rome: Edizioni Croce, 2017.
- L'amore negato, Milan: Ceschina, 1928; Palermo: Sellerio, 1993.

=== Literature for children ===
- I racconti di Cismè, Palermo: Sandron, 1912.
- Pirichitto, Palermo: Sandron, 1914.
- I figli dell'uomo sapiente, Ostiglia: La Scolastica, 1915; Milan: Mondadori, 1939.
- Cenerella, Florence: Bemporad, 1918.
- Il galletto rosso e blu e altre storielle, Palermo: Sandron, 1921.
- Il giardino dei Grigoli, Milan: Treves, 1922.
- I racconti dell'Avemmaria, Palermo: Sandron, 1922.
- Storia di buoni zoccoli e di cattive scarpe, Florence: Bemporad, 1926.

=== Other ===
- Un idillio letterario inedito verghiano: lettere inedite di Maria Messina a Giovanni Verga, edited by Giovanni Garra Agosta, introduction by Concetta Greco Lanza, Catania: Greco, 1979.
- "Coming Home", trans. Juliette Neil, in Virginia's Sisters: An Anthology of Women's Writing , London: Aurora Metro Books, 2023.

== English translations ==
- A House in the Shadows (La casa nel vicolo), translated by John Shepley, Marlboro, Vermont: The Marlboro Press, 1990.
- Behind Closed Doors: Her Father's House (Casa paterna) and Other Stories of Sicily, translated from the Italian and with an Introduction and Afterword by Elise Magistro, New York: The Feminist Press at the City University of New York, 2007.

== Bibliography ==
=== Further reading ===
- Bartolotta, Lucio (2006). Maria Messina (1887–1944) (in Italian). Mistretta: Il centro storico.
- Caracoglia, Vicenza (2015). Una Mansfield siciliana: Maria Messina (in Italian). Villanova di Guidonia, RM: Aletti.
- Di Giovanna, Maria (1989). La fuga impossibile: sulla narrativa di Maria Messina (in Italian). Napoli: Federico & Ardia.
- Giordano, Filippo (2016). Mistretta e Maria Messina: un legame secolare (in Italian). Tricase: Youcanprint.
- Pausini, Cristina (2001). Le briciole della letteratura: le novelle e i romanzi di Maria Messina (in Italian). Bologna: Clueb.
