= Germana Dominici =

Italian actress (1946–2024)

- Born: 1 December 1946; Palermo, Italy
- Died: 3 January 2024 (aged 77); Rome, Italy
- Occupations: Actress; Voice actor
- Years active: 1962 - 2012

Germana Dominici (1 December 1946 – 3 January 2024) was an Italian actress and voice actor.

== Biography ==
Born in Palermo on 1 December 1946, Dominici was the second child of actor Arturo Dominici. She began her career at the Cooperativa Doppiatori Cinematografici in the 1960s and joined the dubbing company Gruppo Trenta in 1982. As a voice actress, she dubbed over the likes of Bette Midler, Kim Novak, Laura Gemser, Vanessa Redgrave, Fernanda Montenegro, and Dalila Di Lazzaro. She retired in 2012.

Dominici was the wife of film director Enrico Bomba with whom she had a daughter, Federica. She was the aunt of voice actress Lilli Manzini and impersonator Francesca Manzini.

Germana Dominici died in Rome on 3 January 2024, at the age of 77.

== Filmography ==
=== Film ===
- Black Sunday (1960)
- The Seventh Grave (1965)
- Mondo pazzo... gente matta! (1966)
- Mi vedrai tornare (1966)
- Il nano e la strega (1975) - voice
- How to Seduce Your Teacher (1979)
- Il ragazzo del Pony Express (1986)
- Intervista (1987)
- Sentimental Maniacs (1994)

=== Television ===
- Nella vita di Sylvia Plath (1980)
