= Aquilino Pimentel =

Aquilino Pimentel may refer to:

- Aquilino Pimentel Jr. (1933–2019), also known as Nene Pimentel, former senator of the Philippines (1987–1992, 1998–2010)
- Aquilino Pimentel III (born 1964), also known as Koko Pimentel, senator of the Philippines (2011–present)
