= Park Ju-won =

Park Ju-won may refer to:

- Park Ju-won (footballer)
- Park Ju-won (politician)
