= Onward for Future 4.0 =

2019–2020 political party in South Korea

Onward for Future 4.0 미래를 향한 전진 4.0
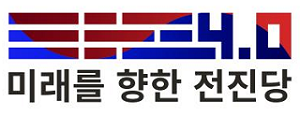
- Abbreviation: Onward
- Leader: Lee Un-ju
- Secretary-General: Park Ju-won
- Chair of the Policy Planning Committee: Song Keun-jon
- Founded: 1 December 2019
- Dissolved: 17 February 2020
- Split from: Bareunmirae Party
- Merged into: United Future Party
- Ideology: Conservatism (South Korean); South Korean nationalism Right-wing populism
- Political position: Right-wing
- Colours: White (customary); Blue; Red
- Slogan: Change the party and change the people so that the world can change! (정당을 바꾸고 사람을 바꿔야 세상이 바뀐다!)

Website
- http://www.xn--ok1b121boib.kr/

Onward for Future 4.0 (Korean: 미래를 향한 전진 4.0) was a South Korean political party.

== History ==
The Onward for Future 4.0 was founded by its president, Lee Un-ju, a former MP of the Bareunmirae Party who was dissatisfied with the leadership of Sohn Hak-kyu.

The party had a pre-inauguration ceremony on 1 December 2019, and announced its flag and logo on 23 December. They announced 44 members including leadership figures, such as Park Hwee-rak (Chief Deputy President), Song Geun-john (Deputy President), Park Ju-won (Secretary-General), Lee Jong-hyuk (General Chairman of the Organising Committee), and Kim Won-sung (Chairman of the Strategic Planning Committee). They also recruited 86 members — 14 for entrepreneurship, economy, labour and renovation, 7 for security and industrial security, 51 for youth startup, and 14 for youth student councils.

On 19 January 2020, the party was officially established. However, after a month, it was merged into the United Future Party.

== Ideology and policies ==
The party described themselves as centre-right, seeks youth politics. The name, "Onward", was inspired from the La République En Marche! of France.

=== 4.0 ===
The party added "4.0" into its name, which means:

- "1.0" - Establishment
  - On 15 August 1948, the former President of the Republic Syngman Rhee, and the other heroes and heroines, established this country, and defended freedom and democracy against communism.
- "2.0" - Industrialisation
  - From 1960s to 1980s, the country was industrialised by sending troops to South Vietnam, miners and nurses to West Germany, and construction workers to the Middle East.
- "3.0" - Democratisation
  - Although the country achieved a democratisation, there were several fakers and hypocrites who endangered the social value and brought a chaotic age.
- "4.0" - Future
  - In future, we should end this chaotic age and rebuild a free and fair society.
