= Right-wing populism =

Political ideology

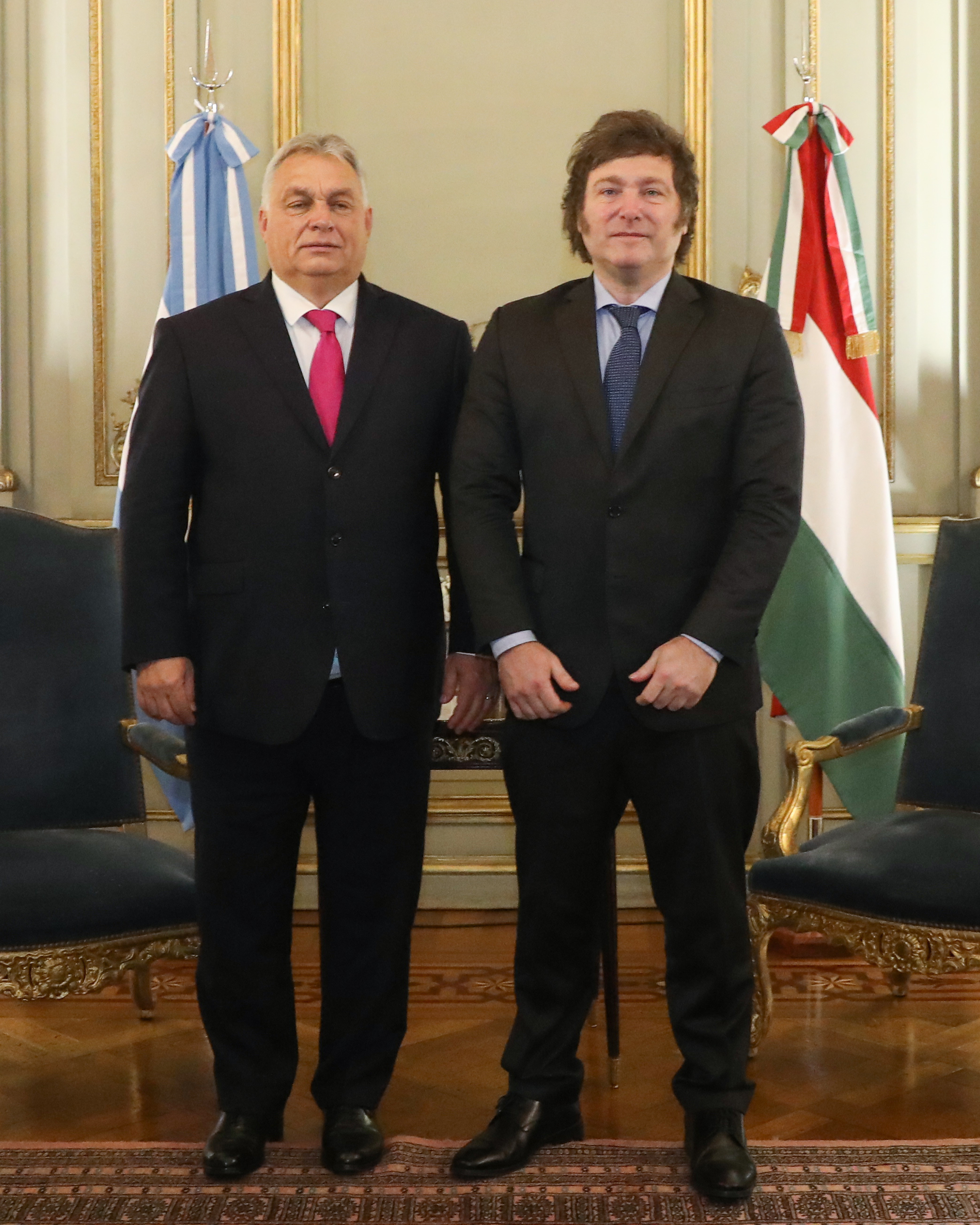
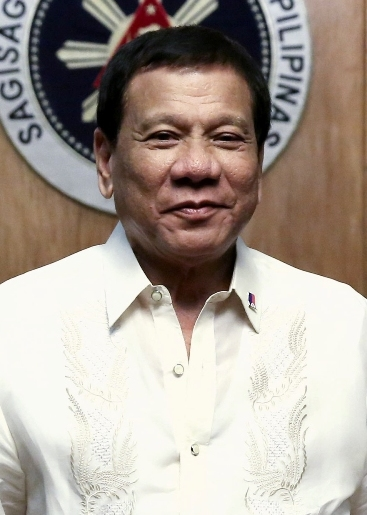
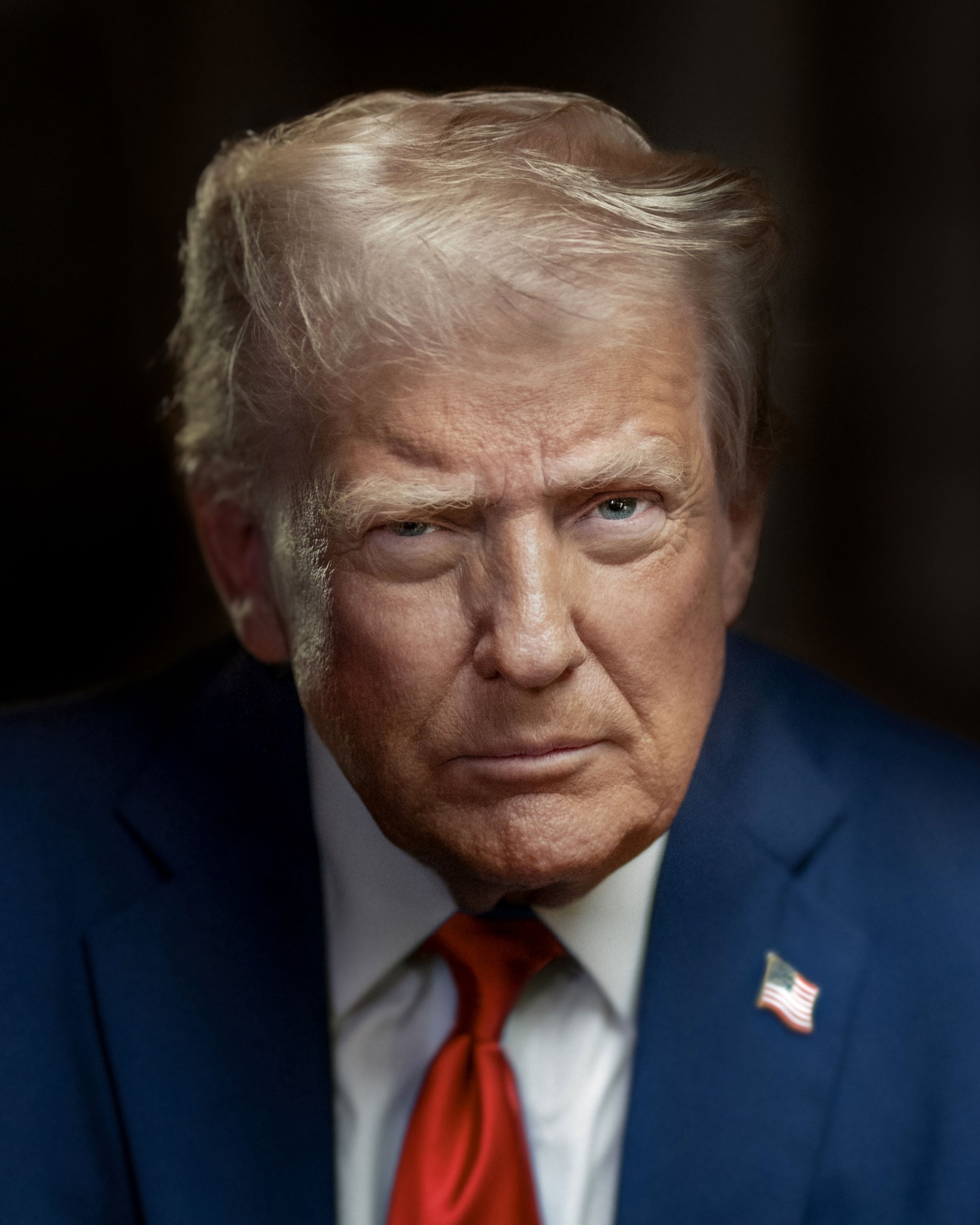
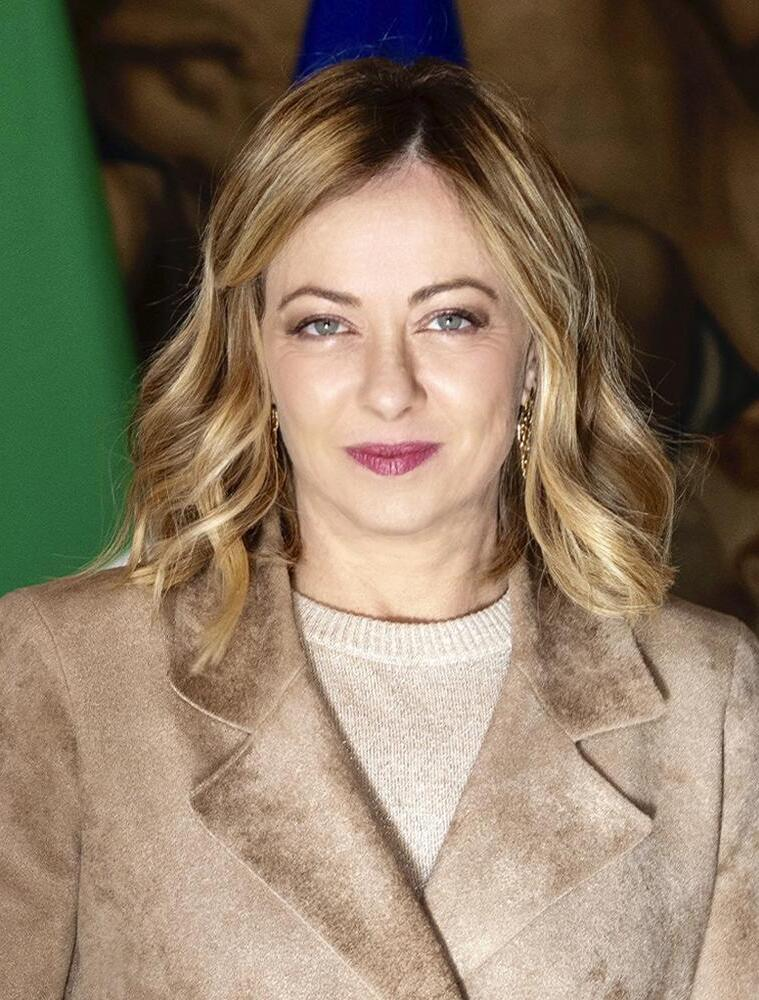
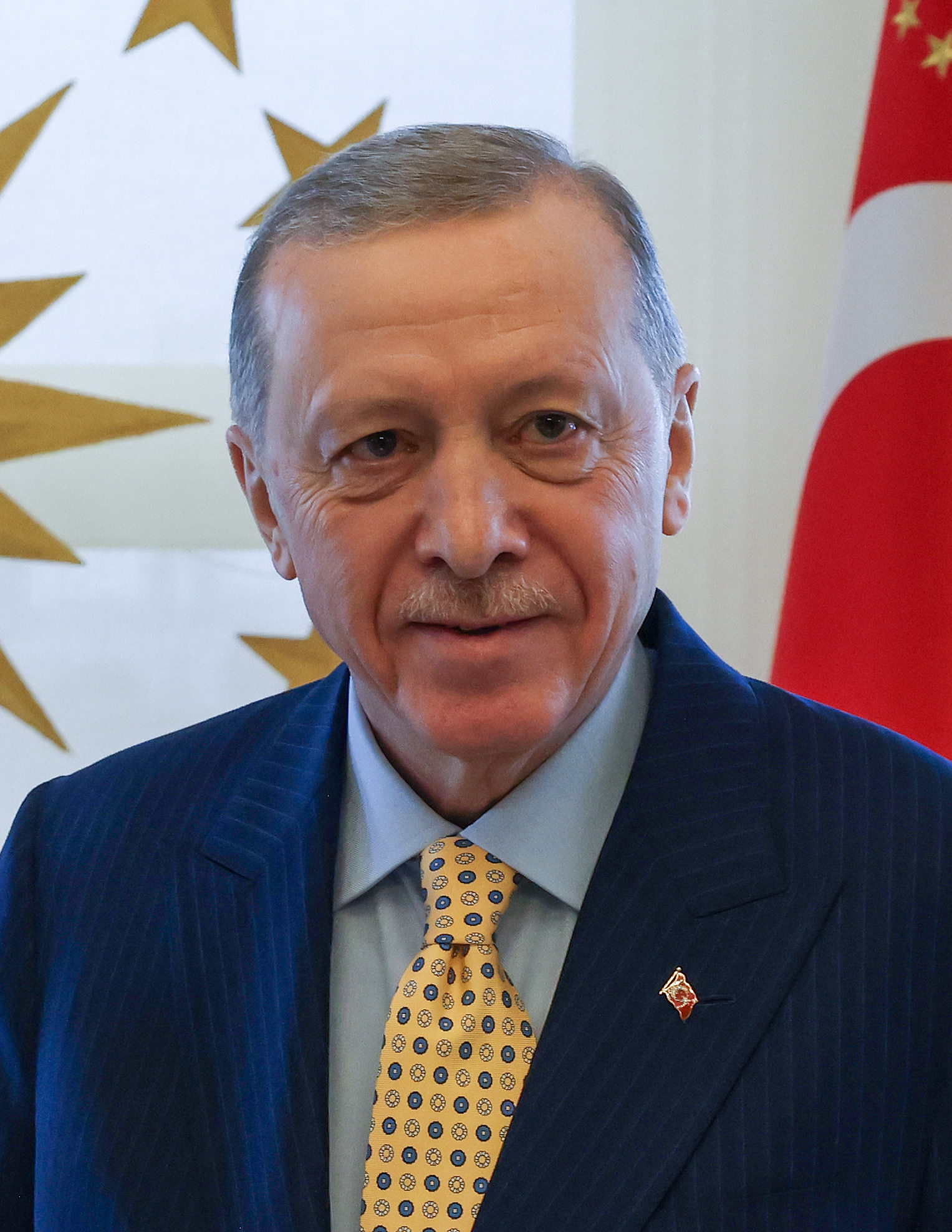
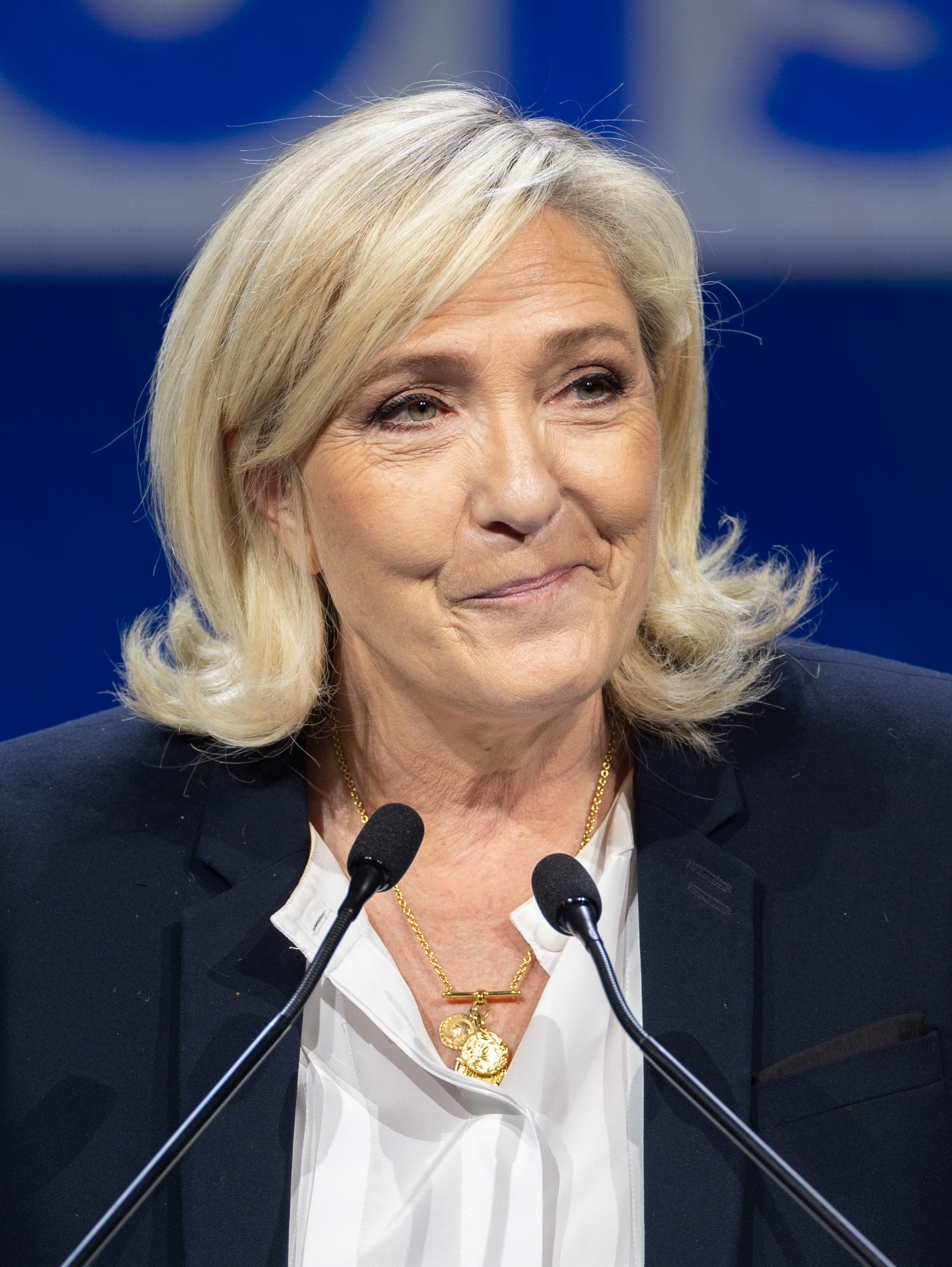
From left to right, top to bottom:
- Former Prime Minister of Hungary Viktor Orbán and President of Argentina Javier Milei
- Former President of the Philippines Rodrigo Duterte
- President of the United States Donald Trump
- Prime Minister of Italy Giorgia Meloni
- President of Turkey Recep Tayyip Erdoğan
- French politician and President of National Rally Marine Le Pen

Right-wing populism, also called right populism and national populism, is a political ideology that combines right-wing politics with populist rhetoric and themes. Its rhetoric employs anti-elitist sentiments, opposition to the Establishment, and speaking to or for the common people. Recurring themes of this political ideology include neo-nationalism, social conservatism, economic nationalism, and fiscal conservatism. Frequently, they aim to defend a national culture, identity, and economy against perceived attacks by outsiders.

Some right-wing populist parties and movements have associations with elements of authoritarianism, while some far-right populists draw comparisons to fascism. Right-wing populism in the Western world is sometimes associated with ideologies such as anti-environmentalism, anti-globalisation, nativism, and protectionism. In Europe, the term is often used to describe groups, politicians and political parties generally known for their opposition to immigration, and for Euroscepticism. Some right-wing populists may support expanding the welfare state, but only for those they deem fit to receive it; this concept has been referred to as "welfare chauvinism". Since the Great Recession, European right-wing populist movements began to grow in popularity, in large part due to increasing opposition to immigration from the Middle East and Africa, rising Euroscepticism and discontent with the economic policies of the European Union. Some forms of right-wing populism may also go into libertarian themes, with federalism, anti-central bank, pro-sound money and the non-aggression principle being key themes in the libertarian spectre of right-wing populism, with Ron Paul and some parts of the Tea Party movement being a notable example of this.

From the 1990s, right-wing populist parties became established in the legislatures of various democracies. Right-wing populism has remained the dominant political force in the Republican Party in the United States since the 2010s. Although extreme right-wing movements in the United States (where they are normally referred to as the "radical right") are usually characterised as separate entities, some writers consider them to be a part of a broader, right-wing populist phenomenon. Examples of politicians described as right-wing populists include Donald Trump (Note: See Trumpism, which is considered to be built upon right-wing populism.) and Marine Le Pen.

== Definition ==
Right-wing populism is an ideology that primarily espouses neo-nationalism, social conservatism and economic nationalism.

The political scientist Cas Mudde argues that what he calls the "populist radical right" starts with the idea of 'the nation'. He however rejects the use of nationalism as a core ideology of right-wing populism on the ground that there are also purely "civic" or "liberal" forms of nationalism, preferring instead the term nativism: a xenophobic form of nationalism asserting that "states should be inhabited exclusively by members of the native group ('the nation'), and that non-native elements (persons and ideas) are fundamentally threatening to the homogeneous nation-state". Mudde further argues that "while nativism could include racist arguments, it can also be non-racist (including and excluding on the basis of culture or even religion)", and that the term nativism does not reduce the parties to mere single-issue parties, such as the term anti-immigrant does. In the maximum definition, to nativism is added authoritarianism—an attitude, not necessarily anti-democratic or autocratic, to prefer "law and order" and the submission to authority (Note: Mudde: authoritarianism "is the belief in a strictly ordered society, in which infringements of authority are to be punished severely. In this interpretation, [it] includes law and order and "punitive conventional moralism". It does not necessarily mean an anti-democratic attitude, but neither does it preclude one. In addition, the authoritarian's submission to authority, established or not, is "not absolute, automatic, nor blind". In other words, while authoritarians will be more inclined to accept (established) authority than non-authoritarians, they can and will rebel under certain circumstances.")—and populism—a "thin-centered ideology" that considers society to be ultimately separated into two homogeneous and antagonistic groups, "the pure people" versus "the corrupt elite", and which argues that politics should be an expression of the "general will of the people", regardless of human rights or constitutional guarantees. (Note: "Maximal" right-wing populists here give a preference for the état légal—which gives primacy to the law as expressed by the general will via election or referendum; against the Rechtsstaat—which limits the power of the democratic state (the majority) to protect the rights of minorities.) Cas Mudde and Cristóbal Rovira Kaltwasser reiterated in 2017 that within European right-wing populism, there is a "marriage of convenience" of populism based on an "ethnic and chauvinistic definition of the people", authoritarianism, and nativism. This results in right-wing populism having a "xenophobic nature".

Roger Eatwell, emeritus Professor of Comparative Politics at the University of Bath, writes that, "whilst populism and fascism differ notably ideologically, in practice the latter has borrowed aspects of populist discourse and style, and populism can degenerate into leader-oriented authoritarian and exclusionary politics." According to left-wing media Vice, for populism to transition into fascism or proto-fascism it requires a "nihilistic culture and an intractable crisis".

[P]opulism is like fascism in being a response to liberal and socialist explanations of the political. And also like fascism, populism does not recognize a legitimate political place for an opposition that it regards as acting against the desires of the people and that it also accuses of being tyrannical, conspiratorial, and antidemocratic. ... The opponents are turned into public enemies, but only rhetorically. If populism moves from rhetorical enmity to practices of enemy identification and persecution, we could be talking about its transformation into fascism or another form of dictatorial repression. This has happened in the past ... and without question it could happen in the future. This morphing of populism back into fascism is always a possibility, but it is very uncommon, and when it does happen, and populism becomes fully antidemocratic, it is no longer populism.

Erik Berggren and Andres Neergard wrote in 2015 that, "[m]ost researchers agree [...] that xenophobia, anti-immigration sentiments, nativism, ethno-nationalism are, in different ways, central elements in the ideologies, politics, and practices of right-wing populism and Extreme Right Wing Parties." Similarly, the historian Rick Shenkman describes the ideology presented by right-wing populism as "a deadly mix of xenophobia, racism, and authoritarianism". Tamir Bar-On also concluded in 2018 that the literature generally places "nativism" or "ethnic nationalism" as the core concept of the ideology, which "implicitly posits a politically dominant group, while minorities are conceived as threats to the nation". It is "generally, but not necessarily racist"; in the case of the Dutch Party for Freedom for instance, "a religious [minority, i.e. Muslims] instead of an ethnic minority constitutes the main 'enemy'".

Scholars use terminology inconsistently, sometimes referring to right-wing populism as "radical right" or other terms such as new nationalism. Pippa Norris noted that "standard reference works use alternate typologies and diverse labels categorising parties as 'far' or 'extreme' right, 'New Right', 'anti-immigrant' or 'neo-fascist', 'anti-establishment', 'national populist', 'protest', 'ethnic', 'authoritarian', 'anti-government', 'anti-party', 'ultranationalist', 'right-libertarian' and so on". The term authoritarian populism can be used to describe right-wing populism, although it is also used to refer to left-wing political movements.

In regard to the authoritarian aspect of right-wing populism, the political psychologist Shawn W. Rosenberg asserts that its "intellectual roots and underlying logic" are best seen as "a contemporary expression of the fascist ideologies of the early 20th century".

Guided by its roots in ideological fascism ... and its affinity to the fascist governments of 1930s Germany and Italy, [right-wing populism] tends to delegate unusual power to its leadership, more specifically its key leader. This leader embodies the will of the people, renders it clear for everyone else and executes accordingly. Thus distinctions between the leadership, the people as a whole and individuals are blurred as their will is joined in a single purpose. (p.5) ... In this political cultural conception, individuals have a secondary and somewhat derivative status. They are rendered meaningful and valued insofar as they are part of the collective, the people and the nation. Individuals are thus constituted as a mass who share a single common significant categorical quality – they are nationals, members of the nation. ... In this conception, the individual and the nation are inextricably intertwined, the line between them blurred. As suggested by philosophers of fascism ... the state is realized in the people and the people are realized in the state. It is a symbiotic relation. Individuals are realized in their manifestation of the national characteristics and by their participation in the national mission. In so doing, individuals are at once defined and valued, recognized and glorified. (p. 12)

According to Rosenberg, right-wing populism accepts the primacy of "the people", but rejects liberal democracy's protection of the rights of minorities, and favors ethno-nationalism over the legal concept of the nation as a polity, with the people as its members; in general, it rejects the rule of law. All of these attributes, as well as its favoring of strong political leadership, suggest right-wing populism's fascist leanings. The historian Federico Finchelstein defines populism as a form of authoritarian democracy while fascism is an ultraviolent dictatorship.

== Motivations and methods ==
According to Roger Eatwell and Matthew Goodwin, "National populists prioritize the culture and interests of the nation, and promise to give voice to a people who feel that they have been neglected, even held in contempt, by distant and often corrupt elites." They are part of a "growing revolt against mainstream politics and liberal values. This challenge is in general not anti-democratic. Rather, national populists are opposed to certain aspects of liberal democracy as it has evolved in the West. [...] [Their] 'direct' conception of democracy differs from the 'liberal' one that has flourished across the West following the defeat of fascism and which has gradually become more elitist in character." Furthermore, national populists question what they call the "erosion of the nation-state", "hyper ethnic change" and the "capacity to rapidly absorb [high] rates of immigration", the "highly unequal societies" of the West's current economic settlement. They are suspicious of "cosmopolitan and globalizing agendas".

Populist parties use crises in their domestic governments to enhance anti-globalist reactions; these include refrainment towards trade and anti-immigration policies. The support for these ideologies commonly comes from people whose employment might have low occupational mobility. This makes them more likely to develop an anti-immigrant and anti-globalisation mentality that aligns with the ideals of the populist party.

Jean-Yves Camus and Nicolas Lebourg see "national populism" as an attempt to combine the socio-economical values of the left and political values of the right and the support for a referendary republic that would bypass traditional political divisions and institutions as they aim for the unity of the political (the demos), ethnic (the ethnos) and social (the working class) interpretations of the "people", national populists claim to defend the "average citizen" and "common sense", against the "betrayal of inevitably corrupt elites". As the Front National ideologue François Duprat put in the 1970s, inspired by the Latin American right of that time, right-populism aims to constitute a "national, social, and popular" ideology. If both left and right parties share populism itself, their premises are indeed different in that right-wing populists perceive society as in a state of decadence, from which "only the healthy common people can free the nation by forming one national class from the different social classes and casting aside the corrupt elites".

Methodologically, by co-opting concepts from the left—such as multiculturalism and ethnopluralism, which is espoused by the left as a means of preserving minority ethnic cultures within a pluralistic society—and then jettisoning their non-hierarchical essence, right-wing populists can, in the words of the sociologist Jens Rydgren, "mobilize on xenophobic and racist public opinions without being stigmatized as racists". The sociologist Hande Eslen-Ziya argues that right-wing populist movements rely on "troll science", namely "(distorted) scientific arguments moulded into populist discourse" that creates an alternative narrative. In addition to rhetorical methods, right-wing populist movements have also flourished by using tools of digital media, including websites and newsletters, social media groups and pages, as well as YouTube and messaging chat groups.

=== Cultural issues and immigration ===
While immigration is a common theme at the center of many national right-wing populist movements, the theme often crystallizes around cultural issues, such as religion, gender roles, and sexuality, as is the case with the transnational anti-gender theory movements. A body of scholarship has also found populist movements to employ or be based around conspiracy theories, rumors, and falsehoods. Some scholars argue that right-wing populism's association with conspiracy, rumor and falsehood may be more common in the digital era thanks to widely accessible means of content production and diffusion. These media and communication developments in the context of specific historical shifts in immigration and cultural politics have led to the association of right-wing populism with post-truth politics.

== History ==
=== Germany and France (1870–1900) ===
German and French right-wing populism can be traced back to the period 1870–1900 in the aftermath of the Franco-Prussian War, with the nascence of two different trends in Germany and France: the Völkisch movement and Boulangism. Völkischen represented a romantic nationalist, racialist and, from the 1900s, antisemitic tendency in German society, as they idealised a bio-mystical "original nation" that still could be found in their views in the rural regions, a form of "primitive democracy freely subjected to their natural elites". In France the anti-parliamentarian Ligue des Patriotes, led by Georges Ernest Boulanger, Paul Déroulède and Maurice Barrès, called for a "plebiscitary republic", with the president elected by universal suffrage, and the popular will expressed not through elected representatives (the "corrupted elites"), but rather via "legislative plebiscites", another name for referendums. It also evolved to antisemitism after the Dreyfus affair (1894).

=== Denmark and Norway (1970s) ===
Modern national populism—what Pierro Ignazi called "post-industrial parties"—emerged in the 1970s, in a dynamic sustained by voters' rejection of the welfare state and of the tax system, both deemed "confiscatory"; the rise of xenophobia against the backdrop of immigration which, because originating from outside Europe, was considered to be of a new kind; and finally, the end of the prosperity that had reigned since the post–Second World War era, symbolised by the oil crisis of 1973. Two precursor parties consequently appeared in the early 1970s: the Progress Party, the ancestor of the Danish People's Party, and Anders Lange's Party in Norway.

=== Netherlands and France (2001) ===
A new wave of right-wing populism arose after the September 11 attacks. "Neo-populists" are nationalist and Islamophobic politicians who aspire "to be the champions of freedoms for minorities (gays, Jews, women) against the Arab-Muslim masses"; a trend first embodied by the Dutch Pim Fortuyn List and later followed by Geert Wilders' Party for Freedom and Jean Marie and his daughter Marine Le Pen's National Rally. According to Jean-Yves Camus and Nicolas Lebourg, those parties are not a real syncretism of the left and right, as their ideology and voter base are interclassist. (Note: Neo-populists, contrary to the Marxist worldview, do not oppose the "working class" to the "bourgeoisie" and capitalists, but rather the "people" to the "elites" and immigrants.) Furthermore, neo-populist parties went from a critique of the welfare state to that of multiculturalism, and their priority demand remains the reduction of immigration.

=== Hungary (early 2000s) ===
In the early 2000s the Jobbik Party, formally known as the Movement for a Better Hungary, emerged and rapidly became the country's most successful far-right political party. Jobbik, which was founded in 2003, exploited antisemitic and anti-Roma feelings to rally support, as well as strong nationalist rhetoric and hostility to capitalism and liberalism. The party's successful use of internet channels to attract and mobilise young people resulted in tremendous popularity and influence.

Viktor Orbán's Fidesz Party is also a prominent factor in Hungarian right-wing populism. Under Orbán's leadership, Fidesz shifted from a centre-right party to a right-wing populist organisation centred on national sovereignty, anti-immigration policies, and conservative social values, frequently battling with the EU on a variety of topics. Orbán's administration had centralised authority, controlled media and altered legal frameworks to remain in power.

== By country ==
Piero Ignazi, an Italian political scientist, divided right-wing populist parties, which he called "extreme right parties", into two categories: he placed traditional right-wing parties that had developed out of the historical right and post-industrial parties that had developed independently. He placed the British National Party, the National Democratic Party of Germany, the German People's Union, and the former Dutch Centre Party in the first category, whose prototype would be the disbanded Italian Social Movement. In contrast, he placed the French National Front, the German Republicans, the Dutch Centre Democrats, the former Belgian Vlaams Blok (which would include certain aspects of traditional extreme-right parties), the Danish Progress Party, the Norwegian Progress Party and the Freedom Party of Austria in the second category.

Right-wing populist parties in the English-speaking world include the UK Independence Party, Reform UK, and the Australian One Nation. The US Republican Party, the Conservative Party of Canada, the British Conservative Party, the Liberal Party of Australia, and the New Zealand National Party include right-wing populist factions.

=== Africa ===
==== Nigeria ====
Rabiu Kwankwaso and his New Nigeria People's Party are generally populist and ultraconservative. Styling himself off of Aminu Kano, Kwankwaso has voiced support for the welfare state and building more universities, while also increasing the size of the Nigerian Armed Forces and Nigerian Police Force. Kwankwaso is seen as being strongly culturally conservative and a deeply pious Muslim, although he is no Islamist. Even with Kwankwaso's cultural conservatism, he has expressed support for women's rights in Nigeria.

==== South Africa ====
According to John Campbell from the Council on Foreign Relations, Freedom Front Plus is a white and coloured dominated political party that promotes Afrikaner nationalism. The current party manifesto, written by Pieter Groenewald, calls for an end to affirmative action and Black Economic Empowerment while supporting proportional representation. Freedom Front Plus has always promoted policies which are conservative in nature and support Afrikaans-speakers and Christians from the Dutch Reformed Church of South Africa.

==== Uganda ====
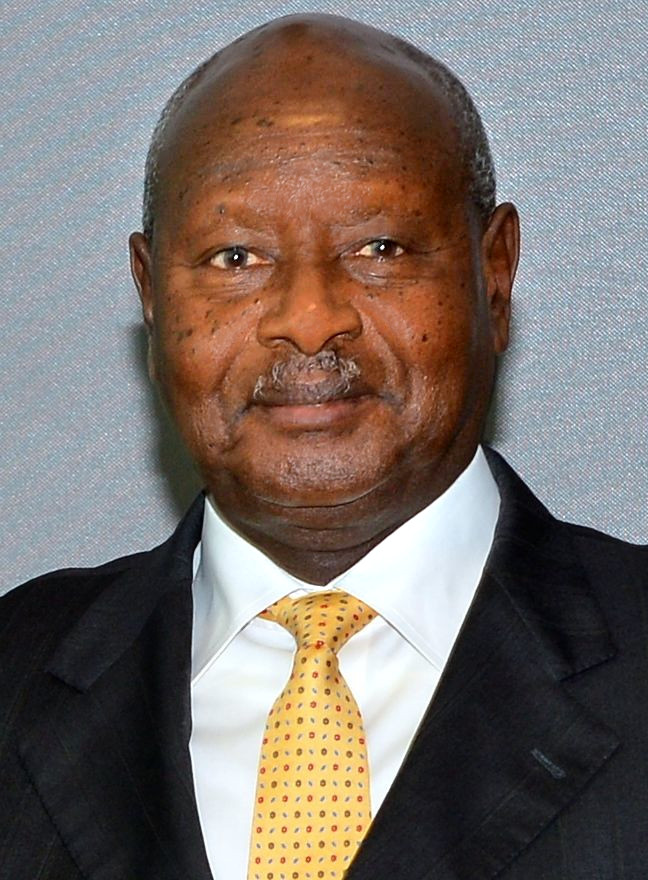
Yoweri Kaguta Museveni, the President of Uganda

President Yoweri Museveni and his party, the National Resistance Movement, are usually considered right-wing populist, anti-LGBT, and Ugandan nationalist. According to Corina Lacatus, "Museveni came to power in 1986 as a populist figure who adopted an authoritarian leadership style and converted over the years in an authoritarian leader. Over the years, he has continued to rely on a tried-and-tested populist discourse that granted him political success in the first place, to continue the advancement of his regime and to promote his election campaigns."

=== Americas ===
==== Argentina ====
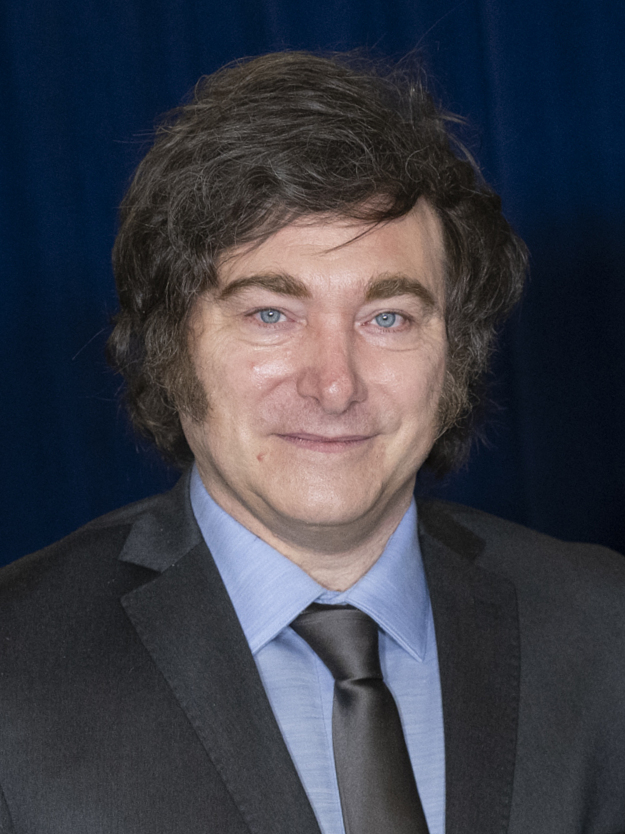
President of Argentina Javier Milei

Javier Milei, the incumbent president of Argentina, is known for his flamboyant personality, distinctive personal style, and strong media presence. Milei's views distinguish him in the Argentine political landscape and have garnered him significant public attention and polarising reactions. He has been described politically as a right-wing libertarian and right-wing populist who supports laissez-faire economics, aligning specifically with minarchist and anarcho-capitalist principles. Milei has proposed a comprehensive overhaul of the country's fiscal and structural policies. He supports freedom of choice on drug policy, firearms, prostitution, same-sex marriage, sexual preference and gender identity, while opposing abortion and euthanasia. In foreign policy he advocates closer relations with the United States, supporting Ukraine in response to the Russian invasion of the country. He is also distancing Argentina from geopolitical ties with China.

Milei has been variously described as far-right, far-right populist, right-wing libertarian, ultraconservative, and ultra-liberal. A philosophical anarcho-capitalist who is for practical purposes a minarchist, Milei advocates minimal government, focusing on justice and security, with a philosophy rooted in life, liberty, and property, and free-market principles. He criticises socialism and communism, advocating economic liberalisation and the restructuring of government ministries. He opposes the Central Bank of Argentina and current taxation policies.

Economically, Milei is influenced by the Austrian school of economics and admires the former president Carlos Menem's policies. He supports capitalism, viewing socialism as embodying envy and coercion. Milei proposes reducing government ministries and addressing economic challenges through spending cuts and fiscal reforms, criticising previous administrations for excessive spending. He has praised the economic policies of the former British prime minister Margaret Thatcher and called her "a great leader".

==== Brazil ====
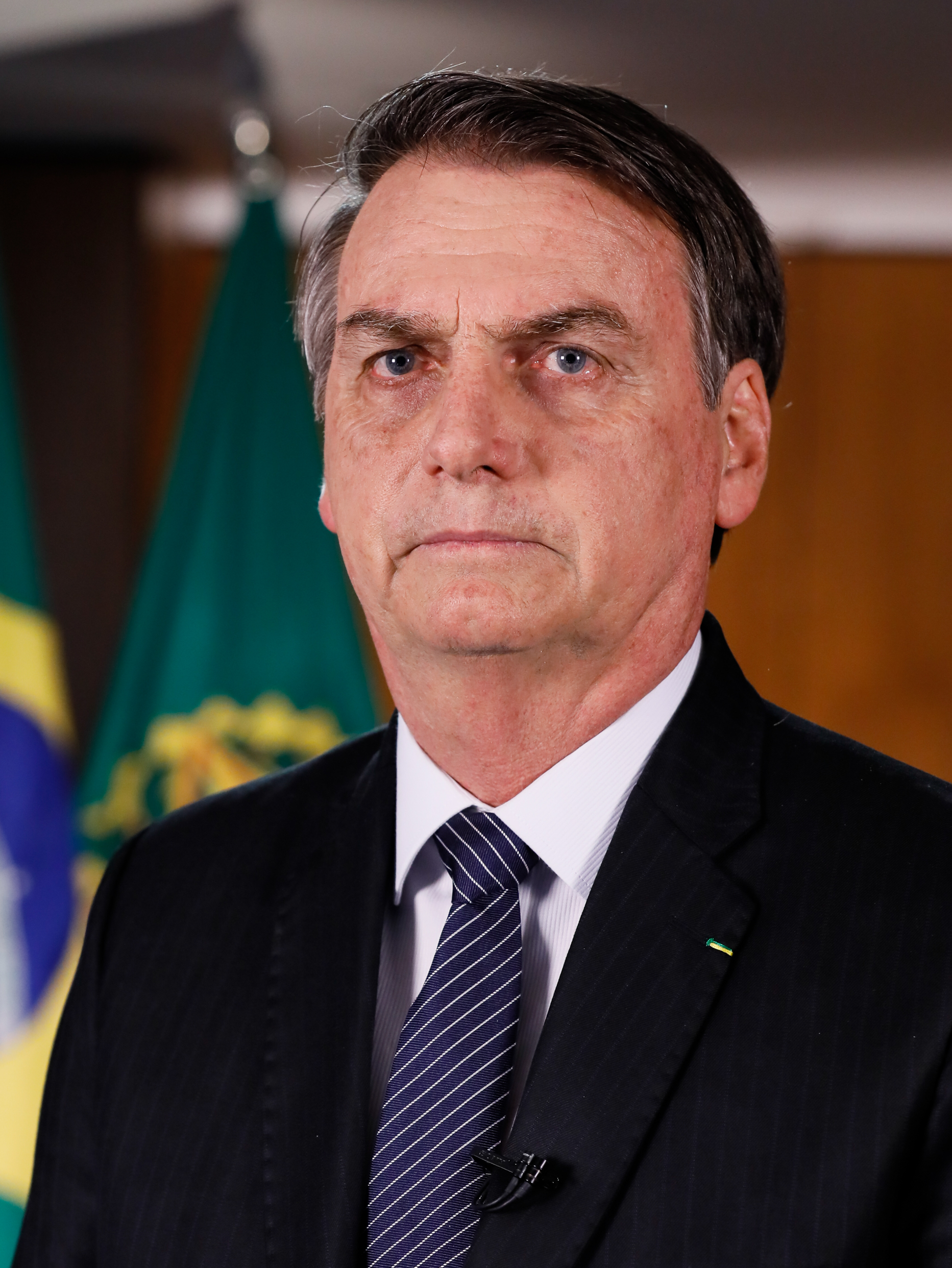
Jair Bolsonaro, Brazilian president from 2019 to 2023

In Brazil right-wing populism began to rise roughly around the time Dilma Rousseff won the 2014 presidential election. In the 2014 general election, Levy Fidelix, from the Brazilian Labour Renewal Party, presented himself with a conservative speech and, according to him, the only right-wing candidate. He spoke for traditional family values and opposed abortion, legalisation of cannabis, and same-sex marriage and proposed that homosexual individuals should be treated far away from the good citizens' and workers' families. In the first round of the general election, Fidelix received 446,878 votes, representing 0.43% of the popular vote. Fidelix ranked 7th out of 11 candidates. In the second round Fidelix supported Aécio Neves.

In addition, according to the political analyst of the Inter-Union Department of Parliamentary Advice, Antônio Augusto de Queiroz, the National Congress elected in 2014 may be considered the most conservative since the "re-democratisation" movement, noting an increase in the number of parliamentarians linked to more conservative segments, such as ruralists, the military, the police and the religious right. The subsequent economic crisis of 2015 and investigations of corruption scandals led to a right-wing movement that sought to rescue fiscally and socially conservative ideas in opposition to the left-wing policies of the Workers' Party. At the same time, right-libertarians, such as those that make up the Free Brazil Movement, emerged among many others. For Manheim (1952), within a single real generation, there may be several generations which he called "differentiated and antagonistic". For him, it is not the common birth date that marks a generation, although it matters, but rather the historical moment in which they live in common. In this case, the historical moment was the impeachment of Dilma Rousseff. They can be called the "post-Dilma generation".

The centrist interim president Michel Temer took office following the impeachment of President Dilma Rousseff. Temer held 3% approval ratings in October 2017, facing a corruption scandal after accusations of obstructing justice and racketeering against him. He managed to avoid trial thanks to the support of the right-wing parties in the National Congress of Brazil. On the other hand, President of the Senate Renan Calheiros, acknowledged as one of the key figures behind Rousseff's destitution and a member of the centrist Brazilian Democratic Movement, was removed from office after facing embezzlement charges.

In March 2016, after entering the Social Christian Party, the far-right congressman Jair Bolsonaro decided to run for President of the Republic. In 2017 he tried to become the presidential nominee of Patriota, but, eventually, Bolsonaro entered the Social Liberal Party and, supported by the Brazilian Labour Renewal Party, he won the 2018 presidential election, followed by the left-wing former Mayor of São Paulo Fernando Haddad of Luiz Inácio Lula da Silva's Workers' Party. Lula was banned from running after being convicted on criminal corruption charges and imprisoned. Bolsonaro has been accused of racist, xenophobic, misogynistic and homophobic rhetoric. His campaign was centred on opposition to crime, political corruption and queer identity, and support for tax cuts, militarism, Catholicity and evangelicalism.

==== Canada ====
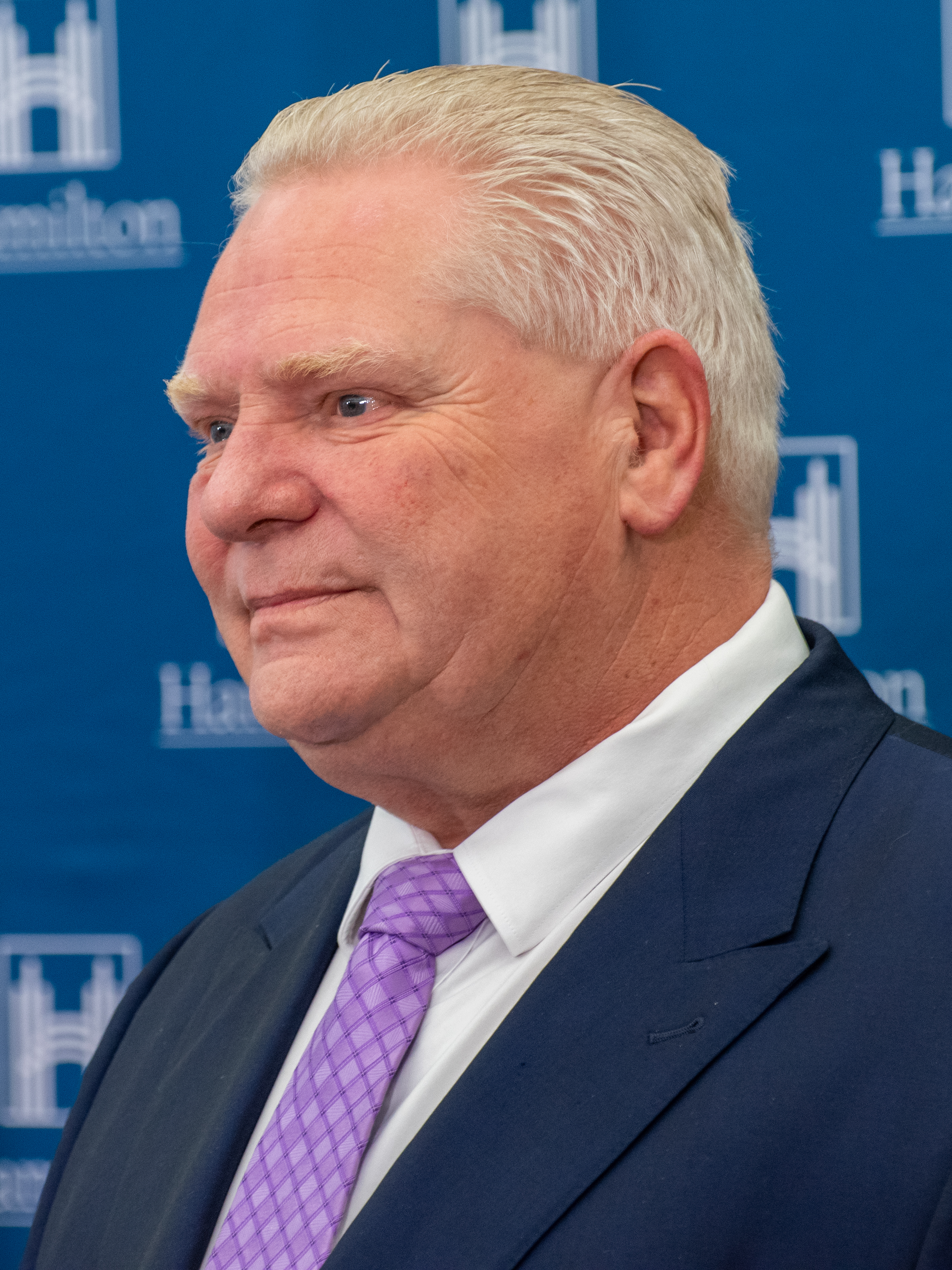
Doug Ford

In recent years, right-wing populist elements have existed within the Conservative Party of Canada and mainstream provincial parties and have been espoused by Ontario MP Kellie Leitch; the businessman Kevin O'Leary; Quebec Premier François Legault; the former Mayor of Toronto Rob Ford; and his brother, Ontario Premier Doug Ford. Doug Ford endorsed Donald Trump during the 2016 United States presidential election and publicly expressed support for him during his first presidency. He again supported Trump in the 2024 election, but later opposed him after that election and expressed regret for supporting him.

In August 2018 the Conservative MP Maxime Bernier left the party, and the following month he founded the People's Party of Canada, which has self-described as "smart populism" and been described as a "hard-right populist" party by Canadian journalists. Bernier lost his seat in the 2019 Canadian federal elections, and the People's Party scored just above 1% of the vote; however, in the 2021 election, it saw improved performance and climbed to nearly 5% of the popular vote.

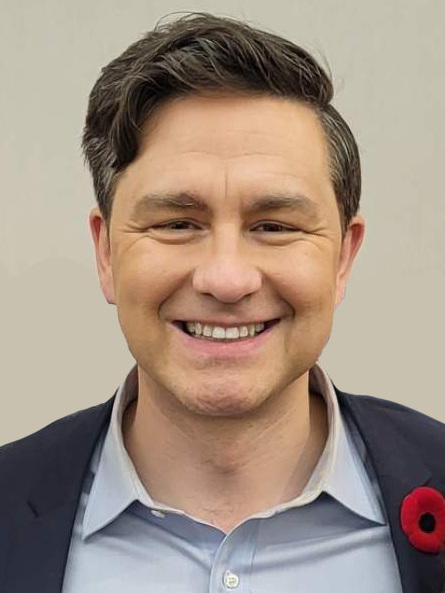
Pierre Poilievre

Pierre Poilievre, who has been described as populist by some journalists, won the 2022 Conservative Party of Canada leadership election and became the leader of both the Conservative Party and the Official Opposition. Some journalists have compared Poilievre to American Republican populists such as Donald Trump and Ted Cruz; however, many journalists have dismissed these comparisons due to Poilievre's pro-choice, pro-immigration and pro-same-sex marriage positions. Zack Beauchamp writing for Vox in 2024 described Poilievre as a "tame populist" and stated that he does not fit the far right because "on policy substance, he's actually considerably more moderate than Trump or European radicals" and "he's unwilling to attack immigrants and ethnic minorities in the way that others in the global far right do". Beauchamp further described "relatively neutered populism" as a strength of Canada's politics rather than a failure.

==== Chile ====
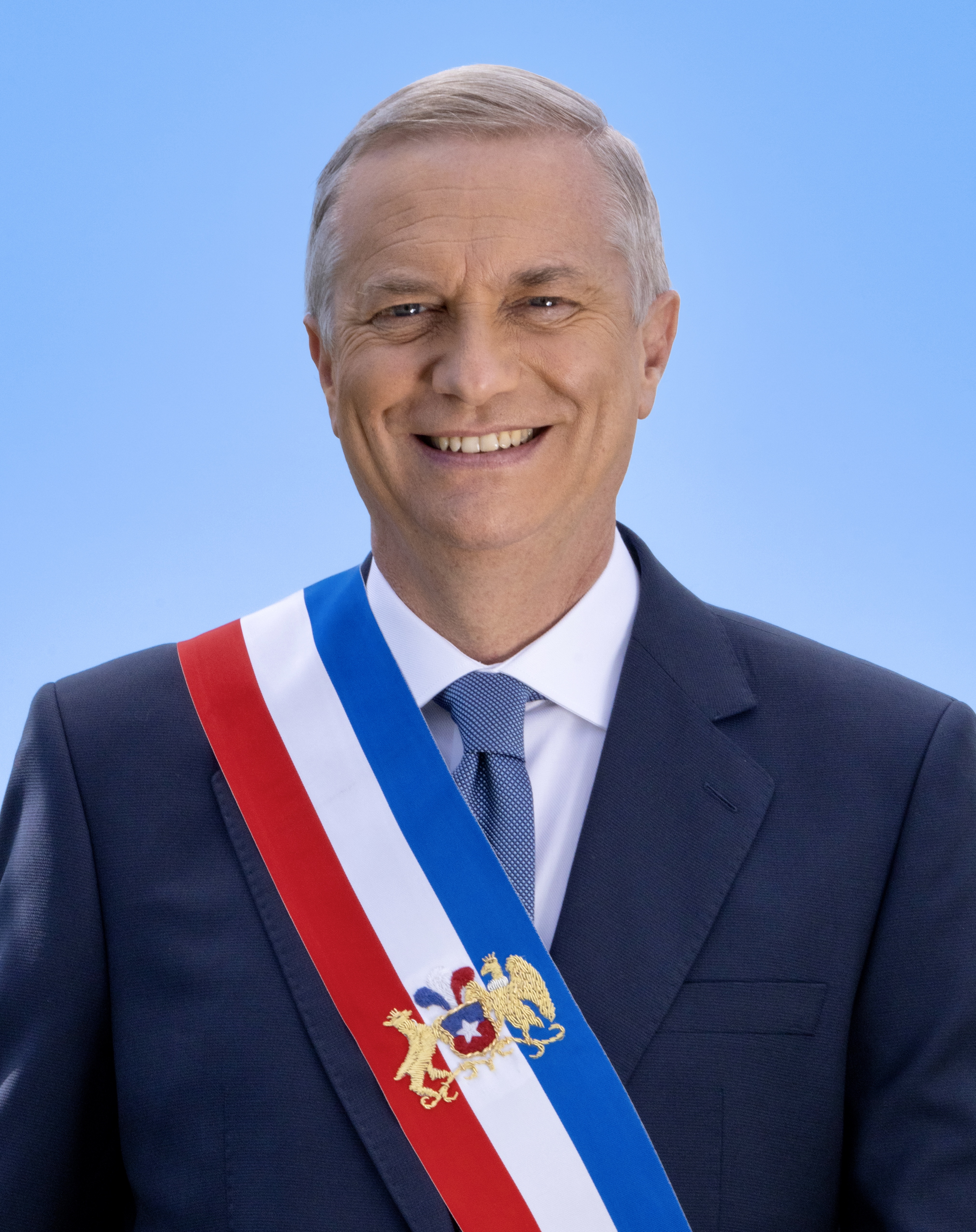
José Antonio Kast

José Antonio Kast, President of Chile since 2026 and his Chilean right-wing Republican Party have been labeled as right-wing populist. Johannes Kaiser, founder of the National Libertarian Party and its candidate in the 2025 presidential election, has also been described as a right-wing populist.

==== Costa Rica ====
In the 2018 political campaign, both the Evangelical Christian candidate Fabricio Alvarado Muñoz and the right-wing anti-establishment candidate Juan Diego Castro Fernández were described as examples of right-wing populists.

==== United States ====
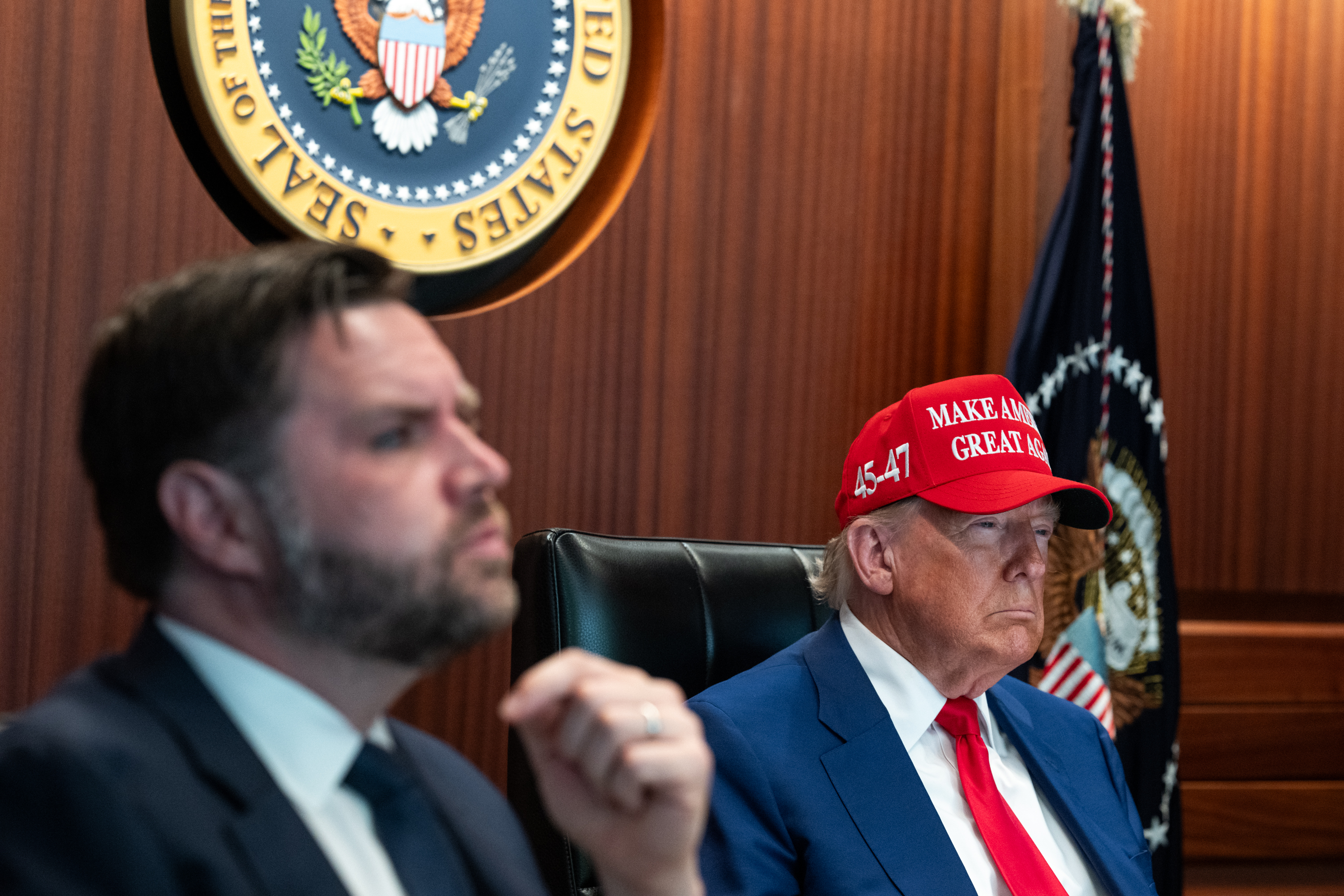
Donald Trump (pictured right) and JD Vance (pictured left).

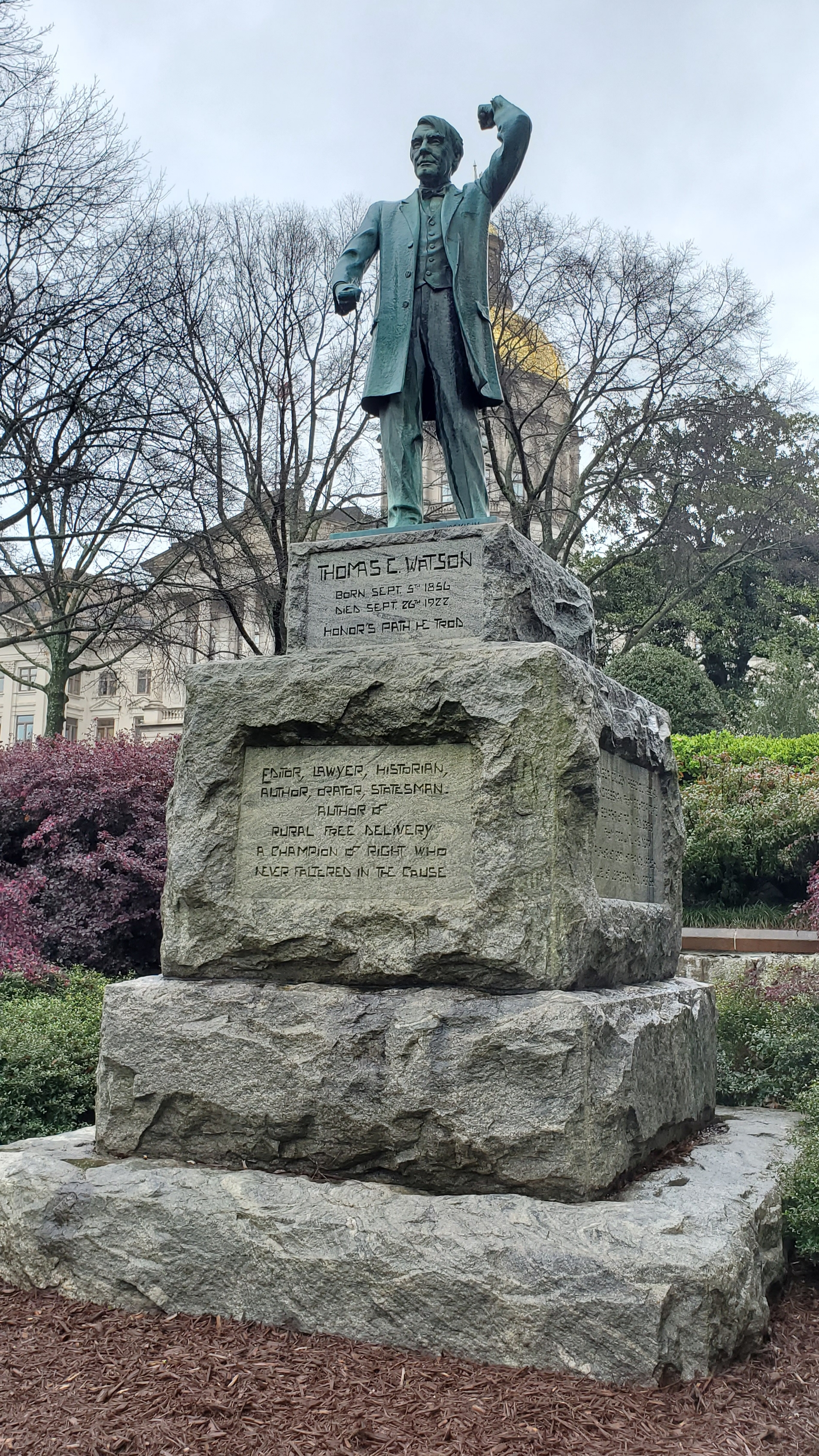
Thomas E. Watson statue in Atlanta, GA, USA. Watson began his political career as a left-wing economic populist before ultimately shifting to a right-wing nativist populism.

In the United States right-wing populism is frequently aligned with evangelical Christianity, segregationism, nationalism, nativism anti-intellectualism and antisemitism. The Republican Party, particularly supporters of Donald Trump, includes right-wing populist factions.

Moore (1996) argues that "populist opposition to the growing power of political, economic, and cultural elites" helped shape "conservative and right-wing movements" since the 1920s. Historical right-wing populist figures in both major parties in the United States have included Thomas E. Watson, Strom Thurmond, (Note: Thurmond was a segregationist from South Carolina and began as member of the Democratic Party, but in 1964 switched to becoming a member of the Republican Party until his death in 2003.) Joseph McCarthy, George Wallace and Pat Buchanan.

Several of the prominent members of the Populist Party of the 1890s and 1900s, while economically progressive, supported social aspects of right-wing populism. Watson, the vice-presidential nominee of the Populist Party in 1896 and presidential nominee in 1900, eventually embraced white supremacy and antisemitism. William Jennings Bryan, the 1896 Populist presidential nominee, was socially and theologically conservative, supporting creationism, Prohibition and other aspects of Christian fundamentalism. Bradley J. Longfield posits Bryan was a "theologically conservative Social Gospeler". An article by National Public Radio's Ron Elving likens the populism of Bryan to the later right-wing populism of Trump.

In 2010 Rasmussen and Schoen characterised the Tea Party movement as "a right-wing anti-systemic populist movement". They added, "Today our country [the United States] is in the midst of a...new populist revolt that has emerged overwhelmingly from the right – manifesting itself as the Tea Party movement." In 2010 David Barstow wrote in The New York Times, "The Tea Party movement has become a platform for conservative populist discontent." Some political figures closely associated with the Tea Party, such as the US senator Ted Cruz and the former US representative Ron Paul, have been described as appealing to right-wing populism. In the US House of Representatives the Freedom Caucus, associated with the Tea Party movement, has been described as right-wing populist.

Donald Trump's presidential campaigns in 2016, 2020, and 2024, noted for their anti-establishment, anti-immigration and protectionist rhetoric, have been characterised as right-wing populist. The ideology of Trump's former Chief Strategist Steve Bannon has also been described as such. Trump's policies and rhetoric have been frequently described as right-wing populist by academics and political commentators.

=== Asia-Pacific countries ===
==== Australia ====
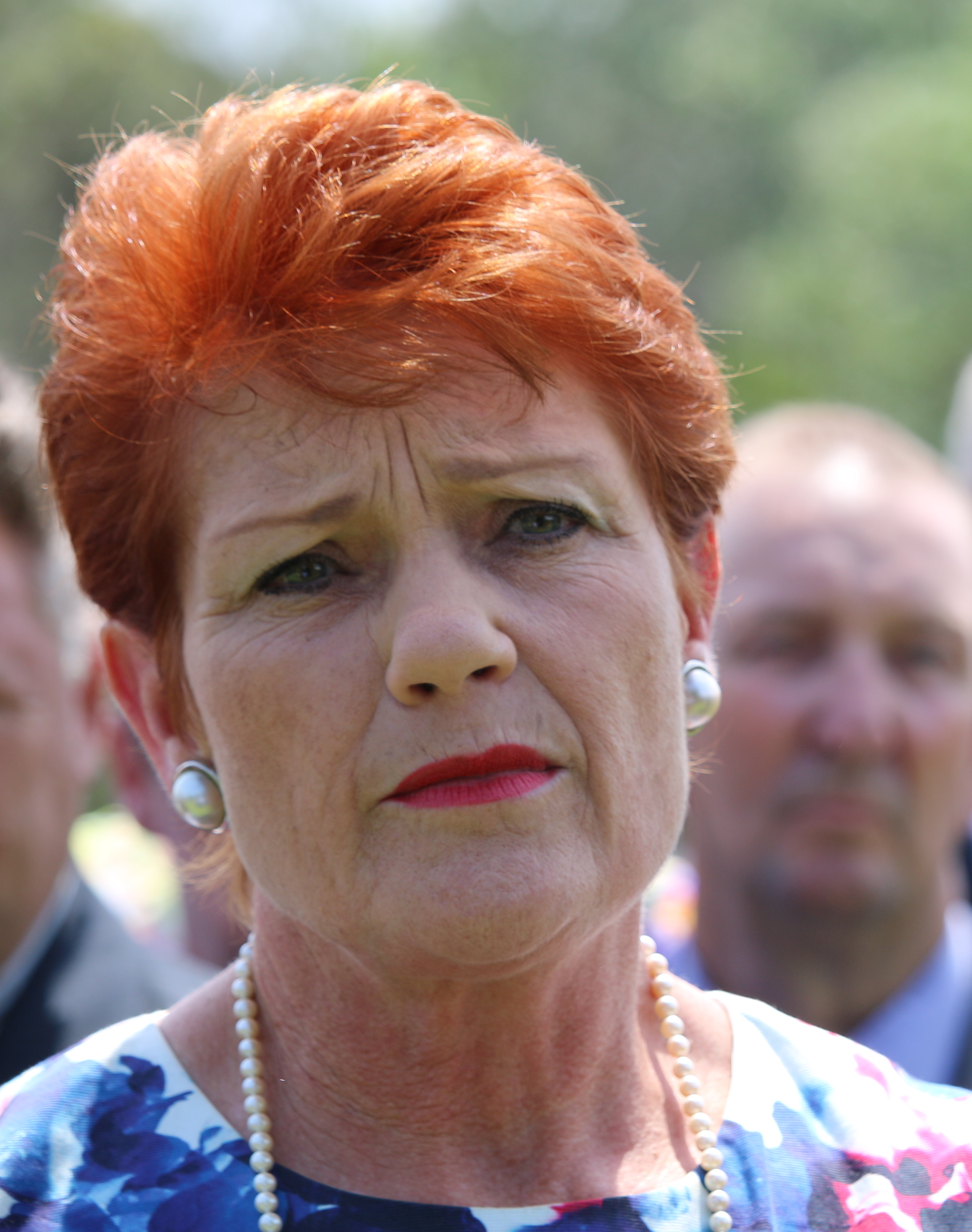
Pauline Hanson

Right-wing populism in Australia often utilises narratives on having a national identity based on settler colonialism with a deeply rooted thought on being the rightful occupants of the land and downplaying the presence and rights of Indigenous Population such as opposition to Indigenous land rights, and resistance to Indigenous recognition.

Right-wing populism has also been represented by Pauline Hanson's One Nation, led by Pauline Hanson, Senator for Queensland and typically preferences votes to the mainstream Liberal-National Coalition, and Katter's Australian Party, led by Queensland MP Bob Katter.

Furthermore, the main centre-right party the Coalition has certain members belonging to the right-wing populist faction known as National Right including the former opposition leader Peter Dutton.

==== China ====
Xi Jinping, CCP General Secretary since 2012

In the 2010s the wave of refugees caused by the Syrian civil war caused a wave of anti-immigration sentiment on the Chinese internet, and many narratives have been similar to those of the populist right have since been observed, such as anti-"western leftism", Islamophobia and anti-multiculturalism.

Since Xi Jinping became the CCP General Secretary in 2012, the Chinese Communist Party (CCP) has been characterized by scholars as adapting views and policies closely related to right-wing populism, particularly on socio-cultural issues as well as foreign policy.

==== Japan ====
In Japan, the Shinzo Abe and Sanae Takaichi administrations have been described as authoritarian populism or nationalistic populism.

Right-wing populist parties in Japan encompasses two distinct factions. One faction includes conservatives such as Nippon Ishin no Kai, who are either unaffiliated with or opposed to the Liberal Democratic Party's (LDP) 1955 System. The other faction resembles Western far-right populists and includes parties such as Japan First Party, Sanseitō, and the Conservative Party of Japan.

==== New Zealand ====
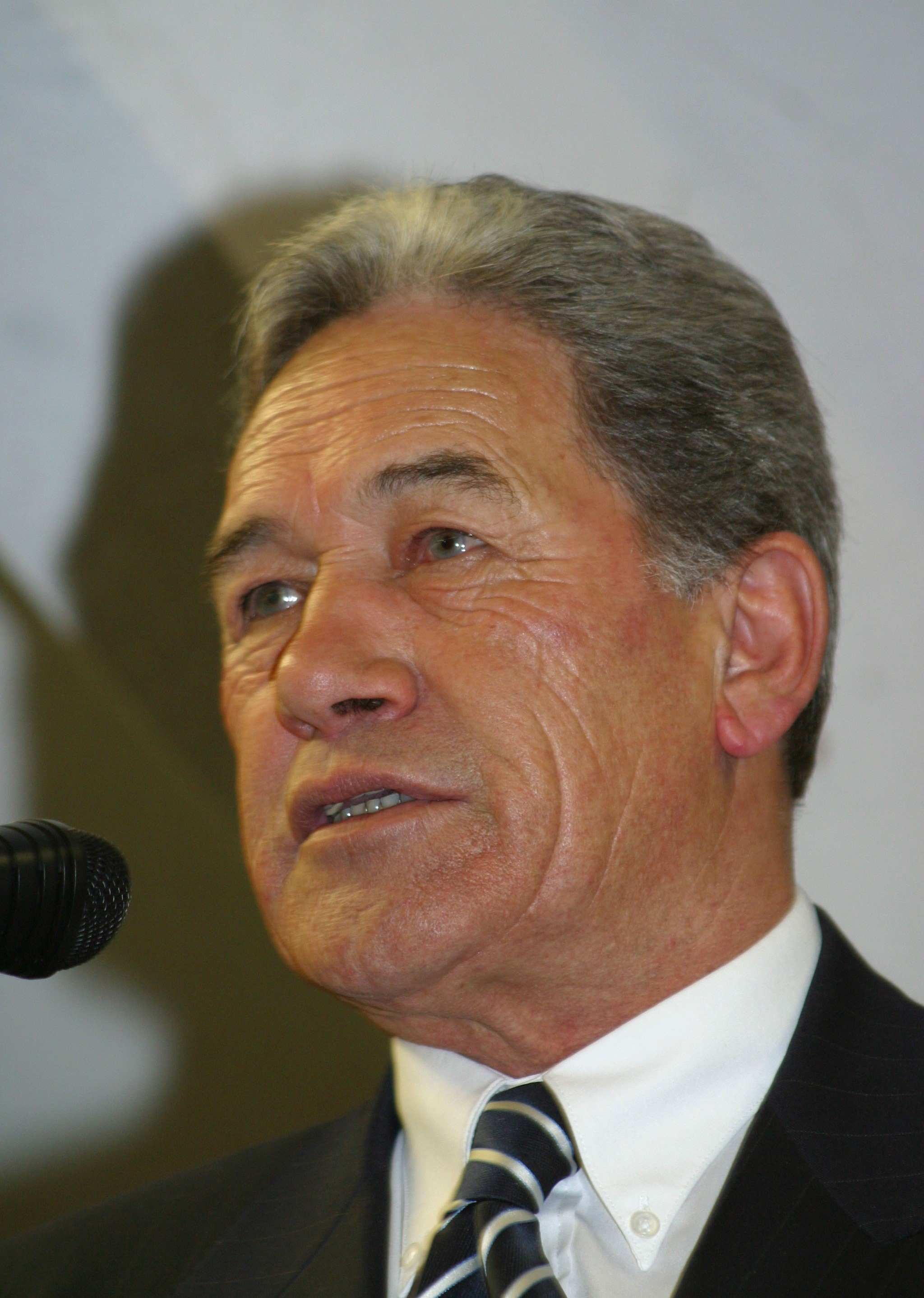
Winston Peters of the New Zealand First party

Right-wing populism is thought to have emerged in New Zealand with Robert Muldoon, the New Zealand National Party prime minister from 1975 to 1984. An economic nationalist and social conservative, Muldoon has been cited as having appealed to the masses through his animosity towards the media and leftists and his own abrasive and colourful public persona. He also often made rude or unusually frank comments about foreign leaders, including American president Jimmy Carter and Australian prime minister Malcolm Fraser, whom he ridiculed and even bullied.

The New Zealand First party, which has historically taken a nationalist standpoint, has been described as a populist party.

==== Pakistan ====
In Pakistan, Pakistan Tehreek Insaaf (PTI) has recently been described as centrist-populist while sharing some characteristics with right-wing populists. Its leader Imran Khan has attacked traditional politicians. The British journalist Ben Judah, in an interview, compared Khan with Donald Trump on his populist rhetoric.

==== Philippines ====
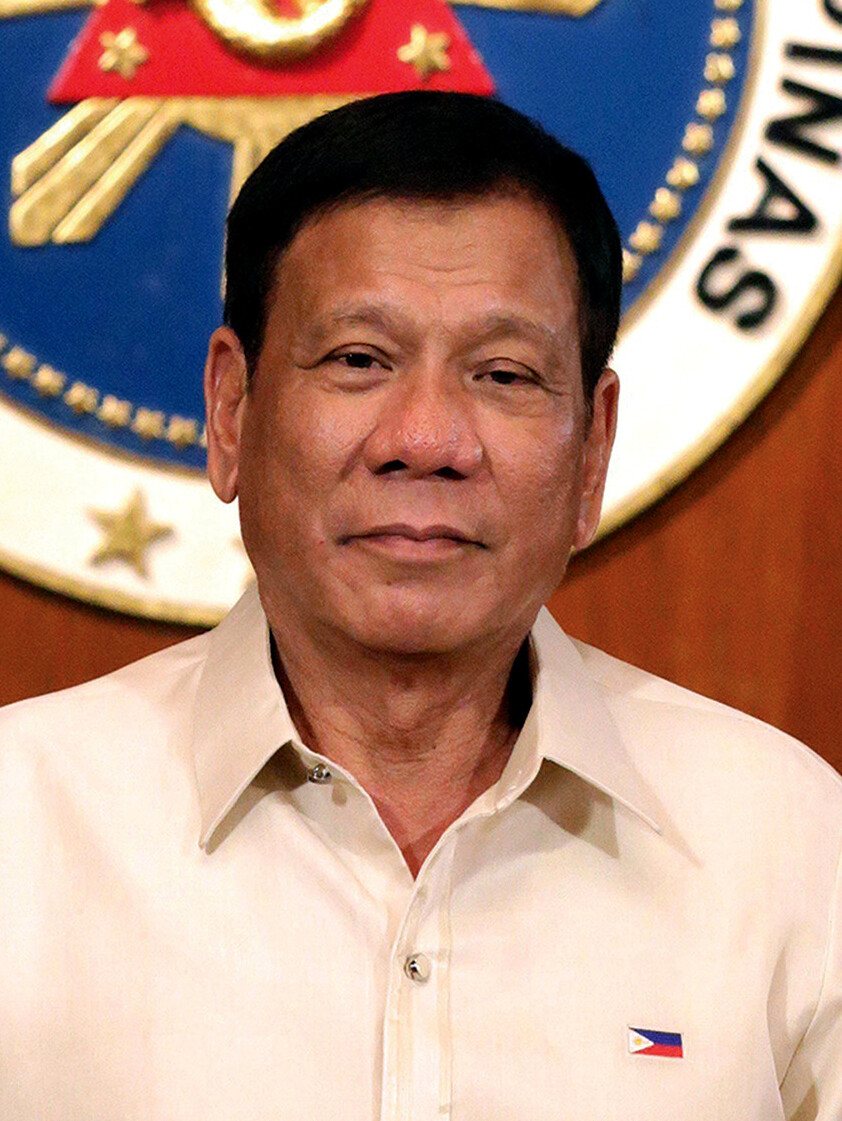
Rodrigo Duterte, Philippine president from 2016 to 2022

In the Philippines, Duterte have labeled as a right-wing populist and authoritarian by some in the mainstream news media.communist. He has been likened to other nationalist figures in the 2010s including Donald Trump and Jair Bolsonaro. The fallout between Duterte and the CPP has also been followed by the expansion of a historical and religiously informed cultural hostility toward left-wing politics in the Philippines, which had been previously reserved for the CPP but which has now spread to the social democratic, democratic socialist and national democratic organizations, such as the Makabayan bloc. Some national democrats and others who identify with the left have refuted Duterte's self-proclaimed socialist credentials given his inability to concretely and seriously tackle the economic aspects of liberalism.

==== Taiwan ====
Taiwan's right-wing populists tend to deny the independent identity of their country's 'Taiwan' and emphasise their identity as a 'Republic of China'. Taiwan's left-wing Taiwanese nationalists have strong pro-American tendencies, so Taiwan's major and minor conservatives are critical of this. In particular, Taiwan's right-wing populists demand that economic growth and right-wing Chinese nationalist issues should be more important than liberal democracy and that they should become closer to the People's Republic of China. Some of Taiwan's leading right-wing populists include Terry Gou, Han Kuo-yu and Chang Ya-chung.

=== European countries ===
In May 2019 Foreign Policy magazine described Ireland, Malta and Portugal as the only three European Union countries without far-right populist parties in their parliament. Portugal subsequently elected the Chega party to its parliament in October 2019. The French-speaking Belgian region of Wallonia is also described as a rare place in Europe without a significant right-wing populism presence, in part due to a media cordon sanitaire which prohibits far-right candidates from live media appearances.

In 2016 senior EU diplomats cited growing anxiety in Europe about Russian financial support for far-right and populist movements and told the Financial Times that the intelligence agencies of "several" countries had scrutinised possible links with Moscow. Also in 2016, the Czech Republic warned that Russia was trying to "divide and conquer" the EU by supporting right-wing populist politicians across the bloc. A 2019 study shows a significant correlation between the price of housing and voting for populist parties in Europe.

==== Belgium ====
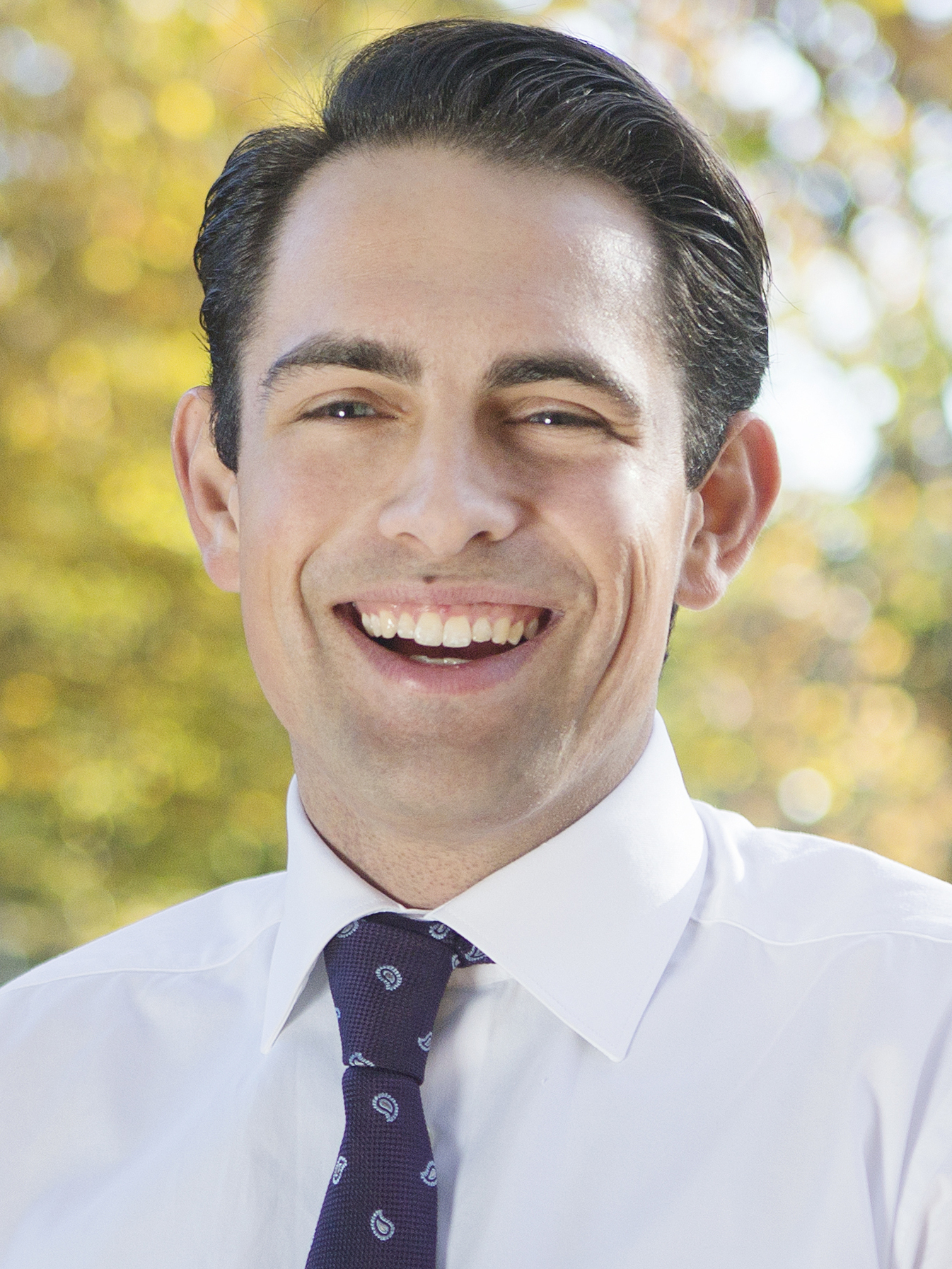
Tom Van Grieken, leader of Vlaams Belang

Vlaams Blok, established in 1978, operated on a platform of law and order, anti-immigration (with a particular focus on Islamic immigration) and secession of the Flanders region of the country. The secession was originally planned to end in the annexation of Flanders by the culturally and linguistically similar Netherlands until the plan was abandoned due to the multiculturalism in that country. In the elections to the Flemish Parliament in June 2004, the party received 24.2% of the vote, within less than 2% of being the largest party. However, in November of the same year, the party was ruled illegal under the country's anti-racism law for, among other things, advocating segregated schools for citizens and immigrants.

In less than a week, the party was re-established under the name Vlaams Belang, initially with a near-identical ideology before moderating parts of its statute. It advocates the adoption of the Flemish culture and language by immigrants who wish to stay in the country. It also calls for a zero-tolerance stance on illegal immigration and the reinstatement of border controls. Despite some accusations of antisemitism from Belgium's Jewish population, the party has demonstrated a staunch pro-Israel stance as part of its opposition to Islam. In Antwerp, sections of the city's significant Jewish population have begun to support the party. With 23 of 124 seats, Vlaams Belang leads the opposition in the Flemish Parliament. It also holds 11 out of the 150 seats in the Belgian Chamber of Representatives.

The Flemish nationalist and conservative liberal New Flemish Alliance party has been described as populist or containing right-wing populist elements by foreign media such as the German Die Zeit magazine. However, the party has rebutted the term and does not label itself as such.

In the French-speaking Wallonia, Mischaël Modrikamen, an associate of Steve Bannon, was chairman of the Parti Populaire (PP), which contested elections in Wallonia. Political analysts have generally observed that right-wing populist parties tend to perform better with the Flemish electorate over French-speaking Belgian voters, on the whole, owing to the Flemish vote moving to the right in recent decades and Flemish parties intertwining Flemish nationalism with other issues.

As of the 2019 federal, regional, and European elections, Vlaams Belang has surged from 248,843 votes in 2014 to 783,977 on 26 May 2019.

==== Denmark ====
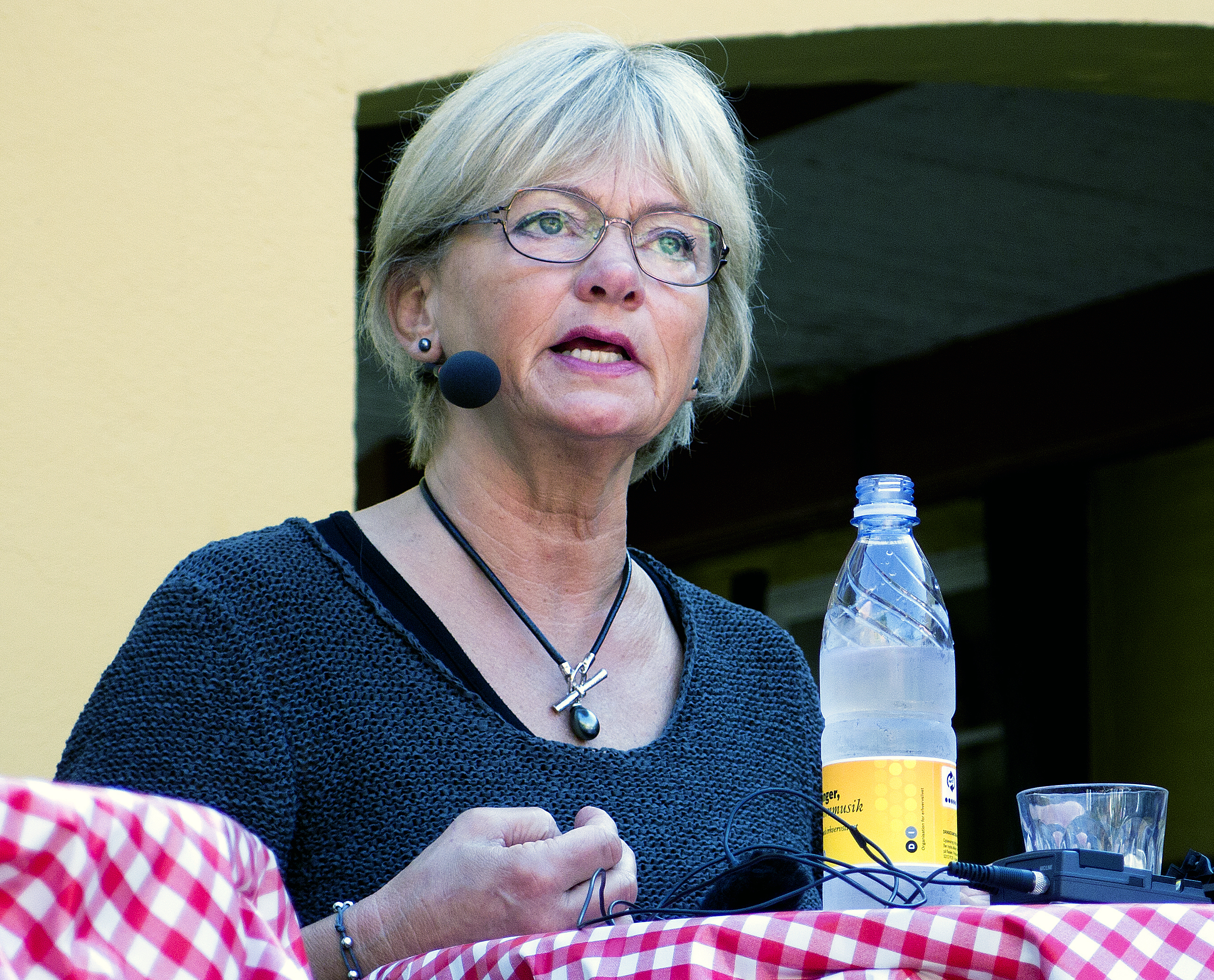
Pia Kjærsgaard, former leader of the Danish People's Party from 1995 to 2012. She held the post of Speaker of the Folketing from 2015 to 2019.

In the early 1970s the home of the strongest right-wing populist party in Europe was in Denmark, the Progress Party. In the 1973 election it received almost 16% of the vote. In the following years its support dwindled, but the Danish People's Party replaced it in the 1990s, becoming an important support party for the governing coalition in the 2000s. At the height of its popularity it won 21% of the vote (corresponding to 37 seats) in the 2015 Danish general election, becoming the second-largest party in the Folketing and serving once again as support party for two minority governments 2015–2019 before being reduced to 16 seats in the 2019 Danish general election and 5 seats (2.6% of the vote) in 2022. In 2015 the New Right party was founded, which gained six seats (3.7% of the vote) at the 2022 election. In 2022 the Denmark Democrats were founded as the most recent right-wing populist party in the Folketing, gaining 8% of the vote and 14 seats at the 2022 general election.

==== Finland ====
In Finland the most popular right wing to far-right party is the Finns Party. The most recent parliamentary election took place on 2 April 2023. After the 2023 election the Orpo Cabinet was formed by the National Coalition, Finns and Swedish People's Party as well as the Christian Democrats.

==== France ====
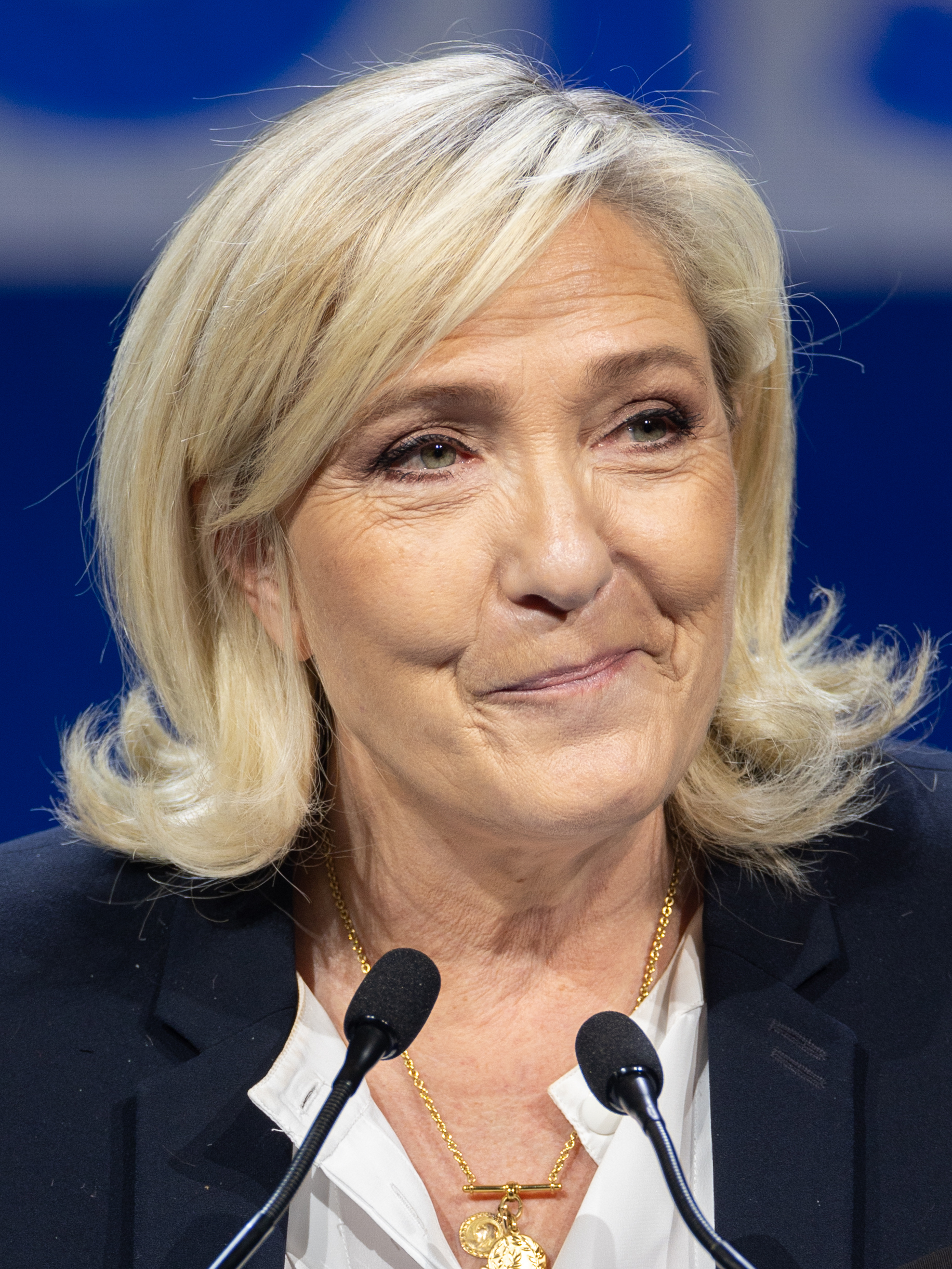
Marine Le Pen, leader of the National Rally and 2017 and 2022 presidential candidate

Gaullism is considered part of (right-wing) populism because it is based on charisma, popular mobilisation, French nationalism, and exceptionalism. Gaullism is deeply embedded in modern right-wing politics in France.

The National Front (NF)—renamed in 2018 as the "National Rally"—has been cited as the "prototypical populist radical right-wing party". The party was founded in 1972 by Jean-Marie Le Pen as the unification of several French nationalist movements of the time; he developed it into a well-organised party. After struggling for a decade, the party reached its first peak in 1984. By 2002 Le Pen received more votes than the socialist candidate in the first round of voting for the French presidency, becoming the first NF candidate to qualify for a presidential runoff election. After Le Pen's daughter, Marine Le Pen, took over as the head of the party in 2011, the National Front established itself as one of the main political parties in France. Marine Le Pen's policy of "de-demonising" or normalising the party resulted in Jean-Marie being first suspended and then ejected from the party in 2015. Marine Le Pen finished second in the 2017 election and lost in the second round of voting versus Emmanuel Macron, which was held on 7 May 2017. However, polls published in 2018 showed that a majority of the French population considered the party to be a threat to democracy.

Right-wing populism in France has also involved cultural issues such as the anti-gay marriage and anti-gender theory movements exemplified by La Manif pour tous.

==== Germany ====
Alternative for Germany is a political party, founded in 2013 and currently led by Alice Weidel and Tino Chrupalla, which has become Germany's largest right-wing populist party.

In 2005 a nationwide Pro Germany Citizens' Movement (pro Deutschland) was founded in Cologne. The Pro-movement appeared as a conglomerate of numerous small parties, voters' associations and societies, distinguishing themselves by campaigns against extremism and immigrants.

The AfD has grown in popularity, particularly in eastern Germany, where it has benefited from economic dissatisfaction and immigration fears. By the mid-2020s, opinion polls consistently placed the AfD as the second-strongest party nationally, with growing influence at both the federal and state level. The party's positions have become more radical over time, including calls for Germany to leave the EU and NATO and opposition to climate protection measures.

In 2024 the AfD won the state election in Thuringia and finished a close second in Saxony and Brandenburg.

The party's constitutional status has been a matter of ongoing legal dispute. In May 2025, Germany's domestic intelligence agency, the Federal Office for the Protection of the Constitution (BfV), classified the federal AfD as a "confirmed right-wing extremist" organization (gesichert rechtsextremistisch), the highest of three monitoring categories. The AfD challenged this classification in court, and in February 2026 the Cologne Administrative Court provisionally barred the agency from applying or publicly stating this classification pending a full trial; as of mid-2026, the case remains unresolved, and the federal party is formally treated as a "suspected case" (Verdachtsfall) in the interim. Separately, several state-level AfD branches — including in Saxony, Thuringia, Saxony-Anhalt, Brandenburg, and Lower Saxony — have been classified as confirmed right-wing extremist by their respective state authorities, with some classifications judicially upheld.

==== Greece ====
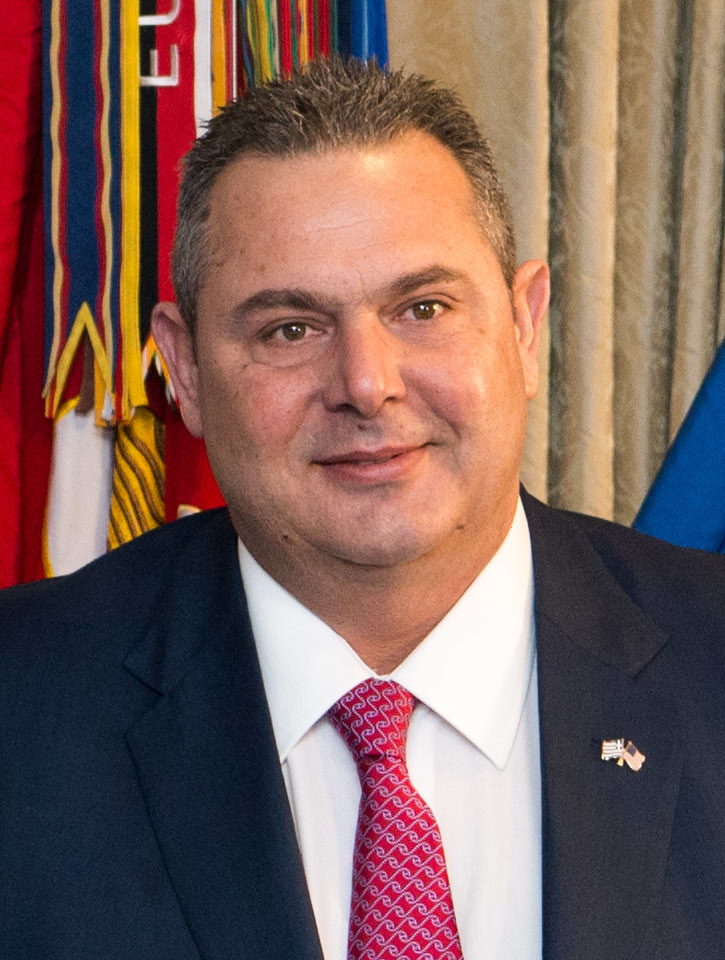
Panos Kammenos, leader of Independent Greeks and Greek Minister for National Defence

The most prominent right-wing populist party in Greece is the Independent Greeks (ANEL). Despite being smaller than the more extreme Golden Dawn party, after the January 2015 legislative elections, ANEL formed a governing coalition with the left-wing Coalition of the Radical Left (SYRIZA), thus making the party a governing party and giving it a place in the Cabinet of Alexis Tsipras.

The Neo-Nazi Golden Dawn has grown significantly in Greece during the economic downturn, gaining 7% of the vote and 18 out of 300 seats in the Hellenic Parliament. The party's ideology includes annexing territory in Albania and Turkey, including the Turkish cities of Istanbul and İzmir. Controversial measures by the party included a poor people's kitchen in Athens, which only supplied Greek citizens and was shut down by the police.

The Popular Orthodox Rally is not represented in the Greek legislature but supplied 2 of the country's 22 MEPS until 2014. It supports anti-globalisation, lower taxes for small businesses, and opposition to Turkish accession to the European Union and the Republic of Macedonia's use of the name Macedonia and immigration only for Europeans. Its participation in government has been one of the reasons why it became unpopular with its voters who turned to Golden Dawn in Greece's 2012 elections.

==== Italy ====
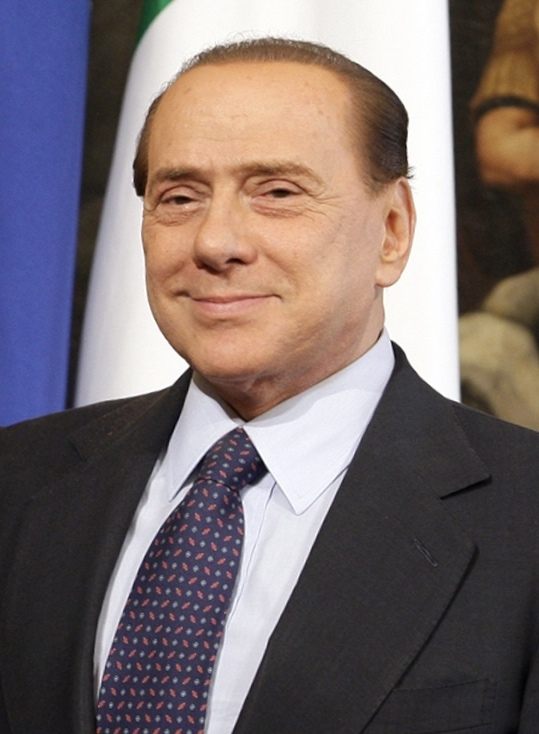
Silvio Berlusconi (1936–2023)

In Italy, Prime Minister Silvio Berlusconi served four separate terms between 1994 and 2011, and is considered the first prominent populist politician in modern Europe, fueling anti-immigrant sentiments, denying the results of the 2006 general election, and often making offensive comments towards the judiciary and political opponents, although his Forza Italia party is considered to be more moderate. Instead, the most prominent right-wing populist party in the last twenty years was the Lega, formerly Lega Nord (LN), whose leaders reject the right-wing label, although not the "populist" one.

The Lega is a federalist, regionalist and sometimes secessionist party, founded in 1991 as a federation of several regional parties of northern and central Italy, most of which had arisen and expanded during the 1980s. LN's program advocates the transformation of Italy into a federal state, fiscal federalism, and greater regional autonomy, especially for the northern regions. At times, the party has advocated for the secession of the north, which it calls Padania. The party generally takes an anti-southern Italian stance as members are known for opposing southern Italian emigration to northern Italian cities, stereotyping southern Italians as welfare abusers and detrimental to Italian society, and attributing Italy's economic troubles and the disparity of the north–south divide in the Italian economy to supposed inherent negative characteristics of the southern Italians, such as laziness, lack of education, or criminality. Certain LN members have been known to publicly deploy the offensive slur terrone, a common pejorative term for southern Italians evocative of negative southern Italian stereotypes.

With the rise of immigration into Italy since the late 1990s, LN has increasingly turned its attention to criticising mass immigration to Italy. The LN, which opposes illegal immigration, is critical of Islam, and proposes Italy's exit from the Eurozone, is considered a Eurosceptic movement and, as such, is a part of the Identity and Democracy (ID) group in the European Parliament. LN was or is part of the national government in 1994, 2001–2006, 2008–2011, and 2018–2019. Most recently, the party, including among its members the presidents of Lombardy and Veneto, won 17.4% of the vote in the 2018 general election, becoming the third-largest party in Italy (largest within the centre-right coalition). In the 2014 European election, under the leadership of Matteo Salvini, it took 6.2% of votes. Under Salvini, the party has, to some extent, embraced Italian nationalism and emphasised Euroscepticism, opposition to immigration, and other "populist" policies while allying with right-wing populist parties in Europe.

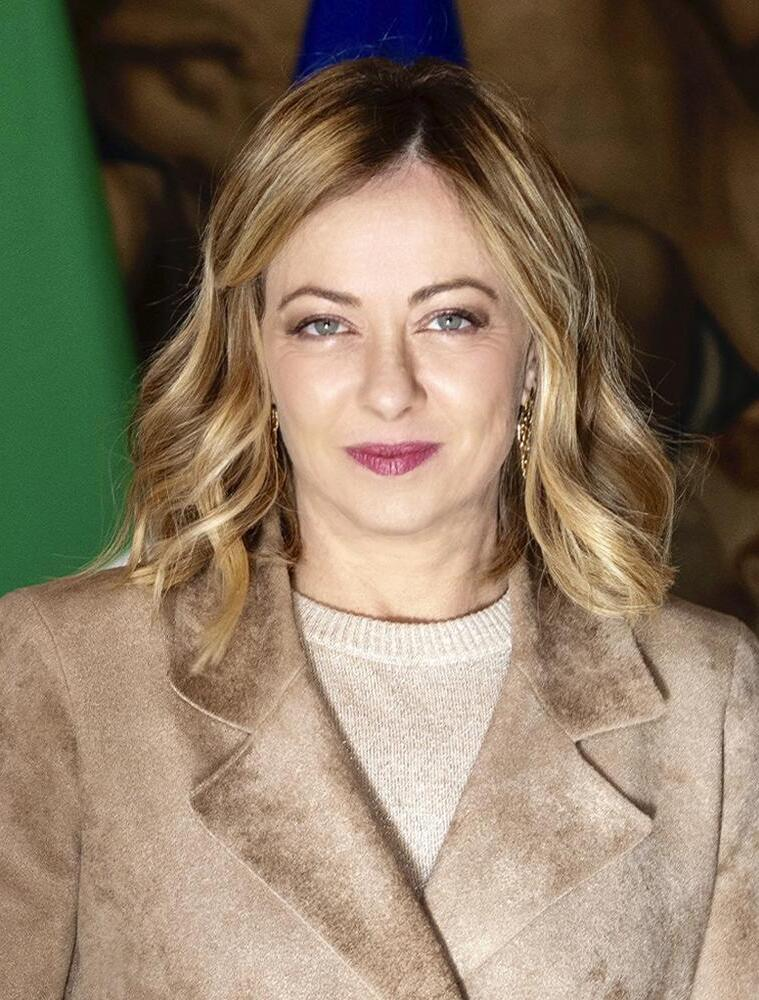
Giorgia Meloni, prime minister since 2022

Between the late 2010s and the early 2020s, another right-wing populist movement emerged within the centre-right coalition. The nationalist and national-conservative Brothers of Italy (FdI), led by Giorgia Meloni, gained 4.4% of votes in the 2018 election and, four years later, it became the most voted party in the 2022 general election, gaining 26% of votes. Meloni was appointed prime minister on 22 October, at the head of what it was considered as the most right-wing Italian government since 1945.

==== Netherlands ====
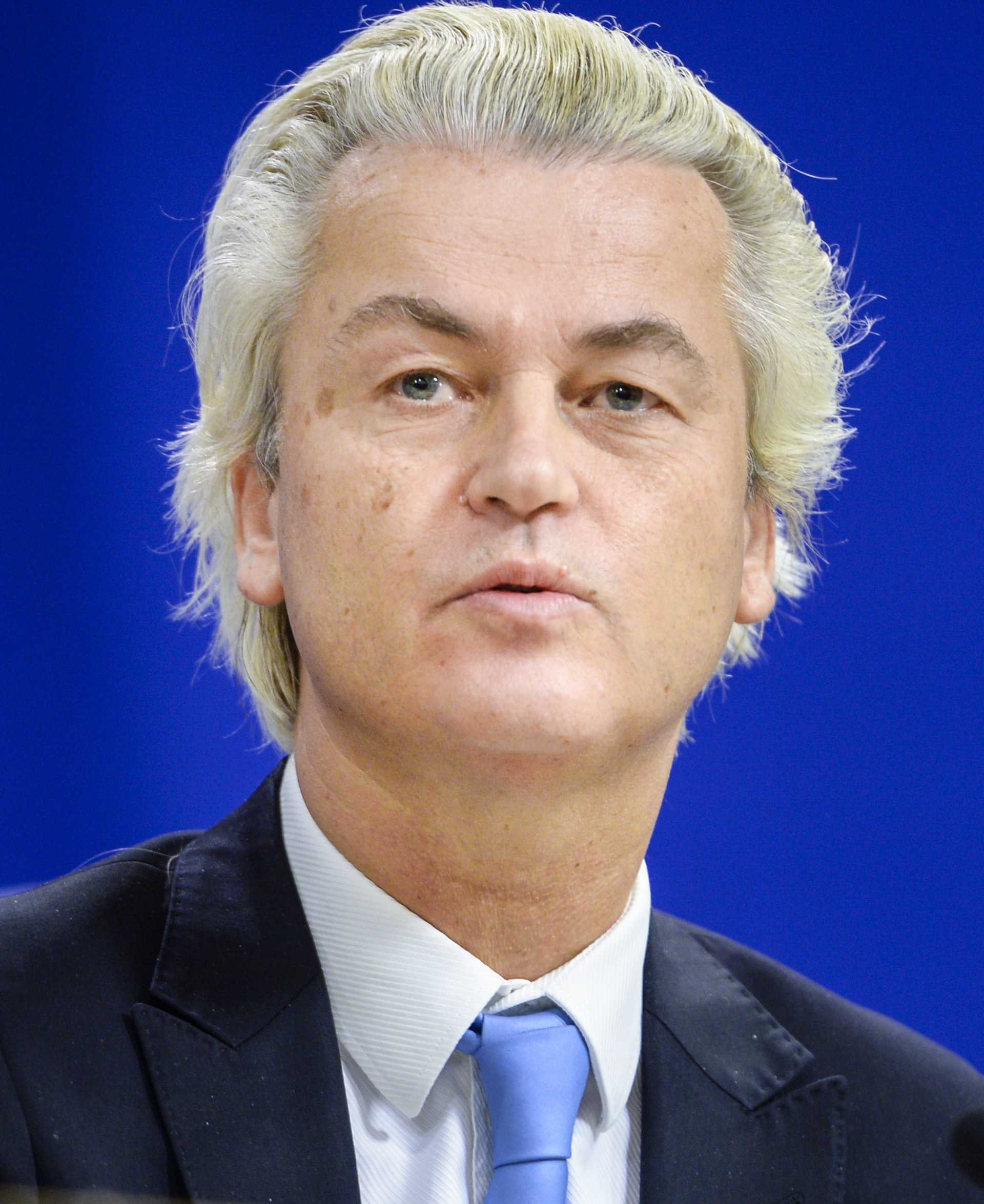
Geert Wilders, leader of the Party for Freedom

In the Netherlands, right-wing populism was represented in the 150-seat House of Representatives in 1982 when the Centre Party won a single seat. During the 1990s a splinter party, the Centre Democrats, was slightly more successful, although its significance was still marginal. Not before 2002 did a right-wing populist party break through in the Netherlands, when the Pim Fortuyn List (LPF) won 26 seats and subsequently formed a coalition with the Christian Democratic Appeal (CDA) and People's Party for Freedom and Democracy (VVD). Pim Fortuyn, who had strong views against immigration, particularly by Muslims, was assassinated in May 2002, two weeks before the election. Ideologically, the LPF differed somewhat from other European right-wing populist movements by holding more liberal stances on certain social issues such as abortion, gay rights, and euthanasia (Fortuyn himself was openly gay) while maintaining an uncompromising stance on immigration, law and order, and the EU. Fortuyn was also credited with shifting the Dutch political landscape by bringing the topics of multiculturalism, immigration, and the integration of immigrants into the political mainstream.

Since 2006 the Party for Freedom (PVV) has been represented in the House of Representatives and described as inheriting the mantle of the Pim Fortuyn List. Following the 2010 general election, it has been in a pact with the right-wing minority government of CDA and VVD after it won 24 seats in the House of Representatives. The party is Eurosceptic and plays a leading role in the changing stance of the Dutch government towards European integration as they came second in the 2009 European Parliament election, winning 4 out of 25 seats. The party's main program revolves around strong criticism of Islam, restrictions on migration from new European Union countries and Islamic countries, pushing for cultural assimilation of migrants into Dutch society, opposing the accession of Turkey to the European Union, advocating for the Netherlands to withdraw from the European Union and advocating for a return to the guilder and abandoning the euro.

From 2017 onwards, the Forum for Democracy (FvD) emerged as another right-wing populist force in the Netherlands. The FvD also advocates a stricter immigration policy and a referendum on Dutch membership of the EU.

The Farmer–Citizen Movement, described as a right-wing populist party, won the 2023 Dutch provincial elections, winning the popular vote and receiving the most seats in all twelve provinces.

==== Poland ====
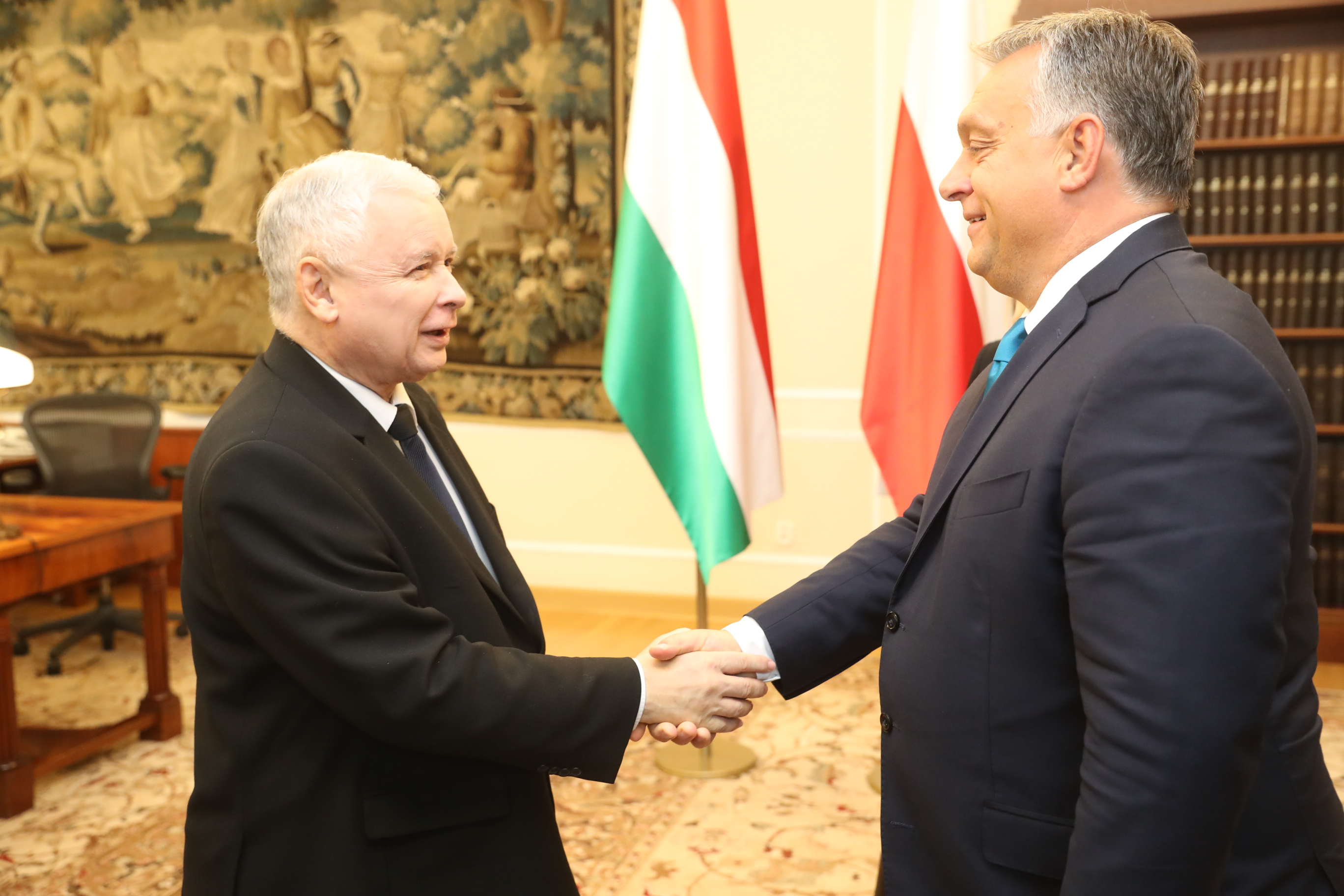
Poland's Law and Justice (PiS) leader Jarosław Kaczyński with Hungarian Prime Minister Viktor Orbán

The largest right-wing populist party in Poland is Law and Justice. It combines social conservatism and criticism of immigration with strong support for NATO and an interventionist economic policy.

The other right-wing populist parties in Poland are Confederation Liberty and Independence and the Confederation of the Polish Crown.

==== Portugal ====
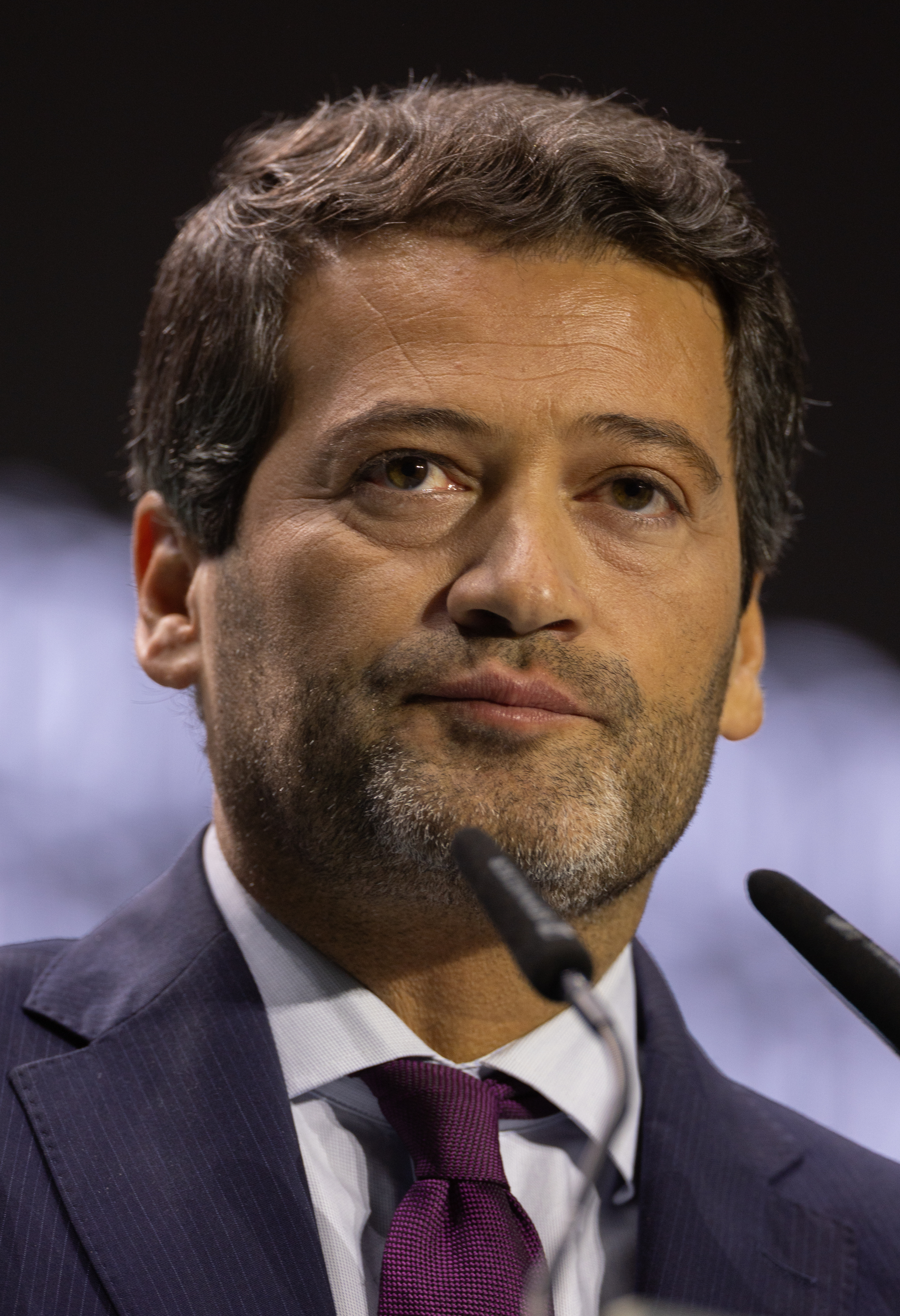
André Ventura, founder and president of Chega

The political party Chega ('Enough!') has risen to prominence in Portugal throughout the early 2020s. Led by André Ventura, the party has expressed anti-immigrant and Eurosceptic views. Chega surged in support during the 2024 Portuguese legislative election. In the 2025 Portuguese legislative election, Chega won more seats than the Socialist Party and became the main opposition, the first time since 1985 one of the two largest parties in Portugal were not the Social Democratic Party or Socialist Party.

Ventura has consistently regarded the rise of Chega as an end to the two-party system in Portugal.

==== Romania ====
The most prominent Romanian right-wing populist party, the Alliance for the Union of Romanians (AUR, in Romanian: Alianța pentru Unirea Românilor), was founded in 2019 by George Simion, an independent candidate for the 2019 Romanian European Parliament Election. Running on a conservative nationalist platform, which was also described as pro-Russian, and aiming for the unification of Moldova with Romania, the party became the fourth-largest political force in the country after the 2020 Romanian parliamentary election. Growing in popularity over the next four years, in the 2024 Romanian parliamentary election, the party became the second-largest political party in Romania and the leading party of the opposition.

The right-wing populist move of AUR prompted the founding of other nationalist parties, with diverse rates of success in the elections. The 2024 parliamentary elections oversaw the entering of the Parliament of Romania of two other right-wing to far-right parties, namely S.O.S. Romania (SOS, in Romanian: S.O.S. România) and the Party of Young People (POT, in Romanian: Partidul Oamenilor Tineri). Both parties split from AUR and are led by former AUR members: Diana Șoșoacă for SOS and Anamaria Gavrilă for POT. S.O.S. Romania has been often called to be "even worse" than AUR by activelly being Russophile, neo-Legionnaire and bearing a Hard Eurosceptic position, calling for the withdrawal of Romania from the European Union.

===== 2024 and 2025 Romanian presidential elections and aftermath =====
With Georgescu barred from candidating, both George Simion and Anamaria Gavrilă filled their candidacies on 14 March, announcing that, shall both candidacies be validated, one of them would withdraw in order to allow full support for one nationalist candidate. The one withdrawing was Anamaria Gavrilă, which publicly announced this on 19 March. In the elections taking place in May, George Simion won the first round by a wide margin, entering the second round with the Save Romania Union (USR, in Romanian: Uniunea Salvați România) endorsed the independent mayor of Bucharest, Nicușor Dan. Dan, who previously received less than two million votes, won by a narrow margin, being elected as President of Romania.

==== Spain ====
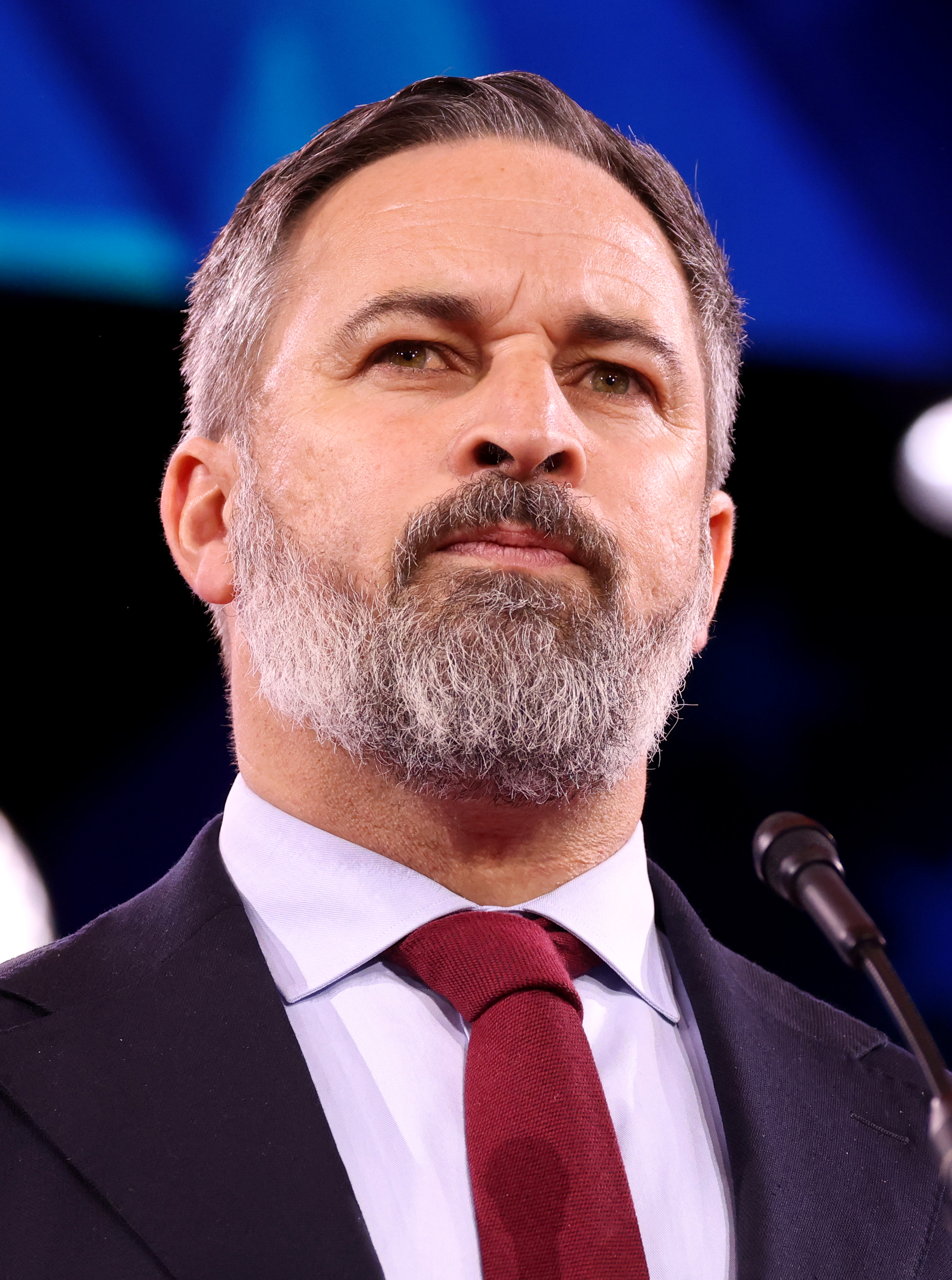
Santiago Abascal, leader of VOX party since 2014

In Spain, the appearance of right-wing populism began to gain strength after the December 2018 election for the Parliament of Andalusia, in which the right-wing populist party VOX managed to obtain 12 seats and agreed to support a coalition government of the parties of the right People's Party and Citizens, although the Socialist Party won the elections. VOX, which has been frequently described as far-right, both by the left parties and by Spanish or international press, promotes characteristic policies of the populist right, such as the expulsion of all illegal immigrants from the country—and of legal immigrants who commit crimes—a generalised criminal tightening, combined with traditional claims of right-wing conservatives, such as the centralisation of the state and the suppression of the Autonomous Communities, and has harshly criticised the laws against gender violence, approved by the socialist government of José Luis Rodríguez Zapatero, but later maintained by the PP executive of Mariano Rajoy, accusing the people and institutions that defend them of applying "gender totalitarianism".

The party official Javier Ortega Smith is being investigated for alleged hate speech after Spanish prosecutors admitted a complaint by an Islamic association in connection with a rally that talked about "the Islamist invasion".

After months of political uncertainty and protests against the party in Andalusia and other regions, in the 2019 Spanish general election, VOX managed to obtain 24 deputies in the Congress of Deputies, with 10.26% of the vote, falling short of expectations after an intense electoral campaign in which VOX gathered big crowds of people at their events. Although the People's Party and Citizens leaders, Pablo Casado and Albert Rivera, had admitted repeatedly during the campaign that they would again agree with VOX to reach the government, the sum of all their seats finally left them far from any possibility, giving the government to the social democrat Pedro Sánchez.

Madrilenian president Isabel Díaz Ayuso, despite being a member of the centre-right People's Party, has been sustained in government by VOX and adopted many policies championed by the party. She has embraced populist rhetoric, defended Spanish imperialism, dismissed climate change, and opposed COVID-19 lockdowns. She has been to compared to Donald Trump by several of her critics.

The 2024 European Parliament election in Spain saw the right-wing populist party Se Acabó La Fiesta (SALF) entering the European Parliament with 3 seats, obtaining over 800,000 votes.

==== Sweden ====
In Sweden, the first openly populist movement to be represented in the Riksdag (Swedish parliament), New Democracy was founded in 1994 by businessman Bert Karlsson and aristocrat Ian Wachtmeister. Although New Democracy promoted economic issues as its foremost concern, it also advocated restrictions on immigration and welfare chauvinism. The party saw a sharp rise in support in 1994 before declining soon after.

In 2010, the Sweden Democrats entered parliament for the first time. The Sweden Democrats originally had connections to white nationalism during its early days but later began expelling hardline members and moderated its platform to transform itself into a more mainstream movement. The party calls for more robust immigration and asylum policies, compulsory measures to assimilate immigrants into Swedish society, and stricter law and order policies. The Sweden Democrats are currently the second largest party in Sweden, with 20.5% of the popular vote in the 2022 Swedish general election, and the second most seats in the Swedish parliament with 72 seats.

==== Switzerland ====
In Switzerland, the right-wing populist Swiss People's Party (SVP) reached an all-time high in the 2015 elections. The party is mainly considered national conservative, but it has also variously been identified as "extreme right" and "radical right-wing populist", reflecting a spectrum of ideologies among its members. Its far-right wing includes members such as Ulrich Schlüer and Pascal Junod, who heads a New Right study group and has been linked to Holocaust denial and neo-Nazism.

In Switzerland, radical right populist parties held close to 10% of the popular vote in 1971, were reduced to below 2% by 1979, and grew to more than 10% in 1991. Since 1991, these parties (the Swiss Democrats and the Swiss Freedom Party) have been absorbed by the SVP. During the 1990s, the SVP grew from the fourth largest party to the largest and gained a second seat in the Swiss Federal Council in 2003 with the prominent politician and businessman Christoph Blocher. In 2015, the SVP received 29.4% of the vote, the highest vote ever recorded for a single party throughout Swiss parliamentary history.

==== United Kingdom ====
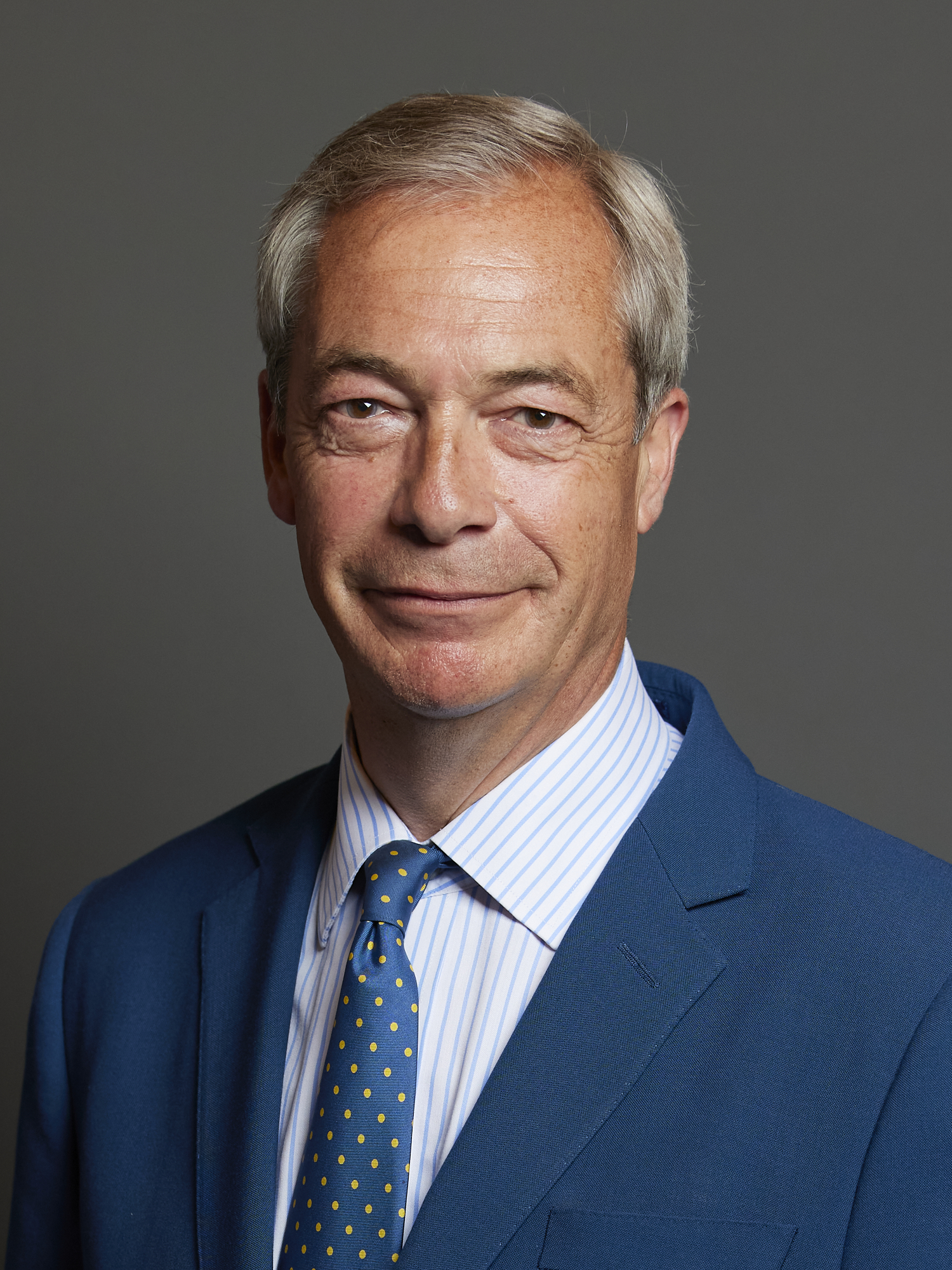
Nigel Farage, leader of Reform UK

The scholarly authors Breeze, Bale, Ashkenas and Aisch, and Clarke et al. characterised the UK Independence Party (UKIP), then led by Nigel Farage, as a right-wing populist party. UKIP campaigned for an exit from the European Union prior to the 2016 European membership referendum and a points-based immigration system similar to that used in Australia. In the 2019 general election, UKIP entered candidates in 44 of the 650 available seats, winning none of them, and achieving 0.1% of the popular vote. In 2013, the Conservative Party, which along with the Liberal Democrats governed from 2010 to 2015 as a coalition government, saw local party campaigners pledging support for UKIP over issues related to the European Union and gay marriage.

The role of UKIP in the UK underwent a rapid transformation post-Brexit, with Nigel Farage leading the initiative to establish the Brexit Party, which was subsequently rebranded as Reform UK. These entities have consistently been identified as extensions of UKIP, sharing common populist ideological elements. After winning 14% of the vote in the 2024 election, political scientist Tim Bale described Reform UK party leader Farage as the "British representative of the populist radical right in Europe", as one of the moderate far-right parties in Europe. Cas Mudde, an expert on populism and extremism, categorised the party as radical right due to the opposition towards "fundamental elements of liberal democracy". In British Politics, political scientist Peter Dorey attributed the electoral decline of the Conservative Party as being intensified by the rise of Reform UK, as a party on the "authoritarian populist Right". The party's most radical faction has since splintered into Restore Britain, With its leader Rupert Lowe becoming a rising star in british politics.

In the Conservative Party, Thatcherism had right-wing populist elements, including nationalism and social conservatism Although Margaret Thatcher has been characterised by some scholars as a right-wing populist politician in the UK, this has been disputed by other scholars due to its applicability in the context of the 1980s. Others contend that Thatcher's role was pivotal in steering the party's ideology towards a more populist direction. The phenomenon is commonly referred to as "Thatcherite populism". Other prominent right-wing populists in the party include past prime minister Boris Johnson and Jacob Rees-Mogg, the former Secretary of State for Business, Energy and Industrial Strategy.

Ingle and Swanson, et al. consider the Northern Ireland Democratic Unionist Party (DUP) to be a right-wing populist party.

== List of parties ==
=== Current parties or parties with right-wing populist factions ===
==== Represented in national legislatures ====
- Argentina – La Libertad Avanza
- Australia – Liberal–National Coalition (Factions including National Right), Pauline Hanson's One Nation, Katter's Australian Party, United Australia Party
- Austria – Freedom Party of Austria, Austrian People's Party (factions)
- Bangladesh – Bangladesh Jamaat-e-Islami
- Belgium – Vlaams Belang
- Brazil – Liberal Party (factions), Democratic Renewal Party
- Bulgaria – Revival,
- Canada – Conservative Party
- China - Chinese Communist Party (factions)
- Chile – Republican Party
- Costa Rica – National Restoration Party, New Republic Party, National Integration Party
- Croatia – Homeland Movement
- Cyprus – ELAM, Solidarity Movement
- Czech Republic – Freedom and Direct Democracy, Motorists for Themselves, ANO 2011
- Denmark – Danish People's Party, New Right, Denmark Democrats
- Estonia – Conservative People's Party of Estonia
- European Union – Patriots.eu, Europe of Sovereign Nations, European Conservatives and Reformists Party (factions)
- Finland – Finns Party
- France – National Rally, Debout la France, Reconquête
- Georgia – People's Power
- Germany – Alternative for Germany
- Greece – Greek Solution, New Democracy (factions), Spartans, Victory
- Hungary – Fidesz, Our Homeland Movement
- Iceland – Centre Party (Iceland)
- India – Bharatiya Janata Party, Shiv Sena
- Indonesia – Gerindra Party, Prosperous Justice Party
- Italy – Lega, Brothers of Italy, Five Star Movement (factions), Forza Italia (factions)
- Israel – Likud, Yamina, Religious Zionist Party, Otzma Yehudit
- Japan – Liberal Democratic Party, Nippon Ishin no Kai, Sanseitō, Conservative Party of Japan,Democratic Party for the People
- Latvia – Latvia First, National Alliance
- Liechtenstein – Democrats for Liechtenstein
- Luxembourg – Alternative Democratic Reform Party
- Malaysia – Perikatan Nasional,Barisan Nasional (factions)
- Netherlands – Party for Freedom, Forum for Democracy, JA21, Farmer-Citizen Movement,
- New Zealand – New Zealand First
- Norway – Progress Party
- Panama – Realizing Goals
- Paraguay – National Union of Ethical Citizens
- Peru – Popular Renewal
- Philippines – Kilusang Bagong Lipunan, Nacionalista Party, PDP–Laban
- Poland – Law and Justice, Confederation (New Hope, National Movement), Kukiz'15, Confederation of the Polish Crown
- Portugal – Chega
- Romania – Alliance for the Union of Romanians, S.O.S. Romania, Party of Young People
- Russia – United Russia (factions), Liberal Democratic Party of Russia, Rodina
- Serbia – United Serbia, Serbian People's Party
- Slovakia – Slovak National Party
- Slovenia – Slovenian Democratic Party, Resni.ca
- South Africa – Freedom Front Plus
- South Korea – People Power Party
- Spain – Vox
- Sweden – Sweden Democrats
- Switzerland – Swiss People's Party, Geneva Citizens' Movement, Ticino League
- Taiwan – Kuomintang (factions)
- Thailand – Bhumjaithai, United Thai Nation Party
- Turkey – Justice and Development Party, Nationalist Movement Party, New Welfare Party, Free Cause Party
- Ukraine – Svoboda
- United Kingdom – Reform UK, Democratic Unionist Party,
- United States – Republican Party (Majority including the Freedom Caucus)
- Uruguay – Open Cabildo

==== Not represented in national legislatures ====
- Albania – Red and Black Alliance, Albanian National Front Party
- Australia – Shooters, Fishers and Farmers Party, Australian Protectionist Party
- Austria – Alliance for the Future of Austria, Free Party Salzburg
- Bangladesh – Bangladesh Jamaat-e-Islami
- Belgium – Libertair, Direct, Democratisch, Chez Nous, VLOTT
- Botswana – Botswana Movement for Democracy
- Brazil – Alliance for Brazil, Brazilian Labour Renewal Party
- Bulgaria – Bulgaria Without Censorship, National Front for the Salvation of Bulgaria, IMRO – Bulgarian National Movement, Attack, Volya
- Canada – People's Party of Canada
- Chile – National Force
- Croatia – Croatian Party of Rights, Croatian Party of Rights Dr. Ante Starčević, Independents for Croatia
- Denmark – Progress Party, Hard Line
- Finland – Blue and White Front, Seven Star Movement, Blue Reform
- France – Alsace First
- Germany – The Homeland, Citizens' Movement Pro Chemnitz, German Social Union, The Republicans
- Greece – Golden Dawn, National Popular Consciousness, National Party - Hellenes, Popular Orthodox Rally, Independent Greeks
- Iceland – Icelandic National Front
- India – Maharashtra Navnirman Sena, Hindu Mahasabha
- Ireland – National Party, Irish Freedom Party
- Israel – Zehut
- Italy – Tricolour Flame, Die Freiheitlichen, Citizens' Union for South Tyrol, South Tyrolean Freedom
- Latvia – For a Humane Latvia, Platform 21
- Liechtenstein – The Independents
- Lithuania – National Alliance, Christian Union, Young Lithuania, Order and Justice
- Malta – Moviment Patrijotti Maltin
- Montenegro – Party of Serb Radicals, True Montenegro, Serb List
- Netherlands – Forza! Nederland
- New Zealand – New Conservative Party, Advance New Zealand, Vision NZ, New Zealand Public Party
- Poland – Congress of the New Right, Real Politics Union
- Portugal – National Renovator Party
- Romania – National Identity Bloc in Europe (Greater Romania Party, United Romania Party, Noua Dreaptă), New Generation Party, M10, Romanian Nationhood Party
- Serbia – Serbian Radical Party, Dveri, Hungarian Hope Movement, Enough is Enough, New Serbia, People's Freedom Movement, Leviathan Movement, Serbian Right, Love, Faith, Hope, Serbian Party Oathkeepers, Healthy Serbia, Dveri,
- Slovakia – Republic, We Are Family, People's Party Our Slovakia
- South Korea – New Pro-Park Party, Liberty Republican Party, Dawn of Liberty
- Spain – Se Acabó La Fiesta, Catalan Alliance
- Sweden – Alternative for Sweden
- Switzerland – Federal Democratic Union of Switzerland, Freedom Party of Switzerland, Swiss Democrats
- Taiwan – New Party
- Transnistria – Obnovlenie
- Turkey - Victory Party
- Ukraine – Congress of Ukrainian Nationalists
- United Kingdom – British National Party, For Britain, UK Independence Party
- United States – Constitution Party

=== Former or disbanded parties ===
- Austria – Team Stronach
- Belgium – National Front, Vlaams Blok, People's Party
- Canada – Union Nationale (Quebec), Ralliement national, Action démocratique du Québec, Reform Party of Canada, Canadian Alliance, Social Credit Party, British Columbia Social Credit Party
- Cyprus – New Horizons
- Croatia – Croatian Democratic Alliance of Slavonia and Baranja, Croatian Democratic Union (factions)
- Czech Republic – Public Affairs, Dawn - National Coalition
- Denmark – Progress Party
- Germany – Citizens' Movement Pro Cologne, German Freedom Party, German People's Union, Pro Germany Citizens' Movement, Pro NRW, German National People's Party
- European Union – Movement for a Europe of Liberties and Democracy
- Iceland – Citizens' Party
- India – Bharatiya Jana Sangh (succeeded by Bharatiya Janata Party)
- Italy – National Alliance
- Japan – Japan Restoration Party
- Netherlands – Centre Democrats, Pim Fortuyn List
- Portugal – Portugal Pro-Life ; Chega
- Serbia – Serbian Patriotic Alliance
- Korea – Democratic Republican Party, Liberty Korea Party, Onward for Future 4.0
- Spain – Platform for Catalonia
- Sweden – New Democracy
- Switzerland – Party of Farmers, Traders and Independents, Republican Movement
- Syria – Arab Liberation Movement
- Thailand – Thai Rak Thai Party
- United Kingdom – National Democrats, Veterans and People's Party

== See also ==
- Authoritarian nationalism
- Christian right
- Counter-Enlightenment
- Criticism of multiculturalism
- Dark Enlightenment
- Fascism
- Hindutva
- Islamism
- Left-wing nationalism
- Left-wing populism
- Morenazi
- National conservatism
- National liberalism
- Neopopulism
- Paternalistic conservatism
- Reactionary
- Revisionist Zionism
- Right-wing antiscience
- Right-wing authoritarianism
- Right-wing terrorism
- Traditionalism
- White backlash

== Bibliography ==
- Berlet, Chip and Matthew N. Lyons. 2000. Right-Wing Populism in America: Too Close for Comfort. New York: Guilford Press. ISBN 1-57230-568-1, ISBN 1-57230-562-2.
- Betz, Hans-Georg. Radical right-wing populism in Western Europe. New York: Palgrave Macmillan, 1994. ISBN 0-312-08390-4.
- Betz, Hans-Georg and Immerfall, Stefan. The New Politics of the Right: Neo-Populist Parties and Movements in Established Democracies. Houndsmill, Basingstoke, Hampshire, UK, Macmillan Press Ltd., 1998. ISBN 978-0-312-21338-1.
- Dolgert, Stefan (2016). "The Praise of Ressentiment: Or, How I Learned to Stop Worrying and Love Donald Trump". New Political Science. 38 (3): 354–370. doi:10.1080/07393148.2016.1189030. S2CID 147965459.
- Fielitz, Maik; Laloire, Laura Lotte (eds.) (2016). Trouble on the Far Right. Contemporary Right-Wing Strategies and Practices in Europe. Bielefeld: transcript. ISBN 978-3-8376-3720-5.
- Fritzsche, Peter. 1990. Rehearsals for Fascism: Populism and Political Mobilization in Weimar Germany. New York: Oxford University Press. ISBN 0-19-505780-5.
- Geden, Oliver (2006). Diskursstrategien im Rechtspopulismus: Freiheitliche Partei Österreichs und Schweizerische Volkspartei zwischen Opposition und Regierungsbeteiligung [Discourse Strategies in Right-Wing Populism: Freedom Party of Austria and Swiss People's Party between Opposition and Government Participation] (in German). Wiesbaden, Germany: VS Verlag. doi:10.1007/978-3-531-90430-6. ISBN 978-3-531-15127-4.
- Goodwin, Matthew; Milazzo, Caitlin (2015). UKIP: Inside the Campaign to Redraw the Map of British Politics. Oxford: Oxford University Press. ISBN 978-0-19-873611-0.
- Greven, Thomas (2016). The Rise of Right-wing Populism in Europe and the United States: A Comparative Perspective (PDF). Berlin: Friedrich-Ebert-Stiftung.
- Heywood, Andrew (2015). Essentials of UK Politics (3rd ed.). London: Palgrave Macmillan. ISBN 978-1-137-53074-5.
- Ignazi, Piero (2002). "The Extreme Right: Defining the Object and Assessing the Causes". In Schain, Martin; Zolberg, Aristide R.; Hossay, Patrick (eds.). Shadows over Europe: The Development and Impact of the Extreme Right in Western Europe. New York: Palgrave Macmillan. ISBN 978-0-312-29593-6.
- ——— (2006) [2003]. Extreme Right Parties in Western Europe. Comparative Politics. Oxford University Press. ISBN 978-0-19-929159-5.
- Kaplan, Jeffrey; Weinberg, Leonard (1998). The Emergence of a Euro-American Radical Right. New Brunswick, New Jersey: Rutgers University Press. ISBN 978-0-8135-2564-8.
- Norris, Pippa (2005). Radical Right: Voters and Parties in the Electoral Market. Cambridge, England: Cambridge University Press. ISBN 978-0-521-84914-2.
- Skenderovic, Damir (2009). The Radical Right in Switzerland: Continuity and Change, 1945–2000. New York: Berghahn Books. doi:10.2307/j.ctt9qcntn. ISBN 978-1-84545-580-4. JSTOR j.ctt9qcntn. S2CID 152401505.
