= Park Ju-won (politician) =

South Korean politician

- 박주원

Secretary-General of Onward for Future 4.0
- In office 23 December 2019 – 17 February 2020
- Preceded by: Office established
- Succeeded by: Office abolished

Mayor of Ansan
- In office 1 July 2006 – 30 June 2010
- Preceded by: Song Jin-sub
- Succeeded by: Kim Chul-min

Personal details
- Born: 6 October 1958 (age 67) Gochang County, North Jeolla Province, South Korea
- Party: United Future (2020-present)
- Other political affiliations: Liberty Korea Party Saenuri Party; Grand National Party; Democratic Party Democratic Party (1991–1995)
- Education: Korea University

Korean name
- Hangul: 박주원
- Hanja: 朴柱源
- RR: Bak Juwon
- MR: Pak Chuwŏn

Park Ju-won (Korean: 박주원; born 6 October 1958) is a South Korean politician who served as the 11th Mayor of Ansan. He also served as the Secretary-General of the short-lived Onward for Future 4.0.

== Early life and education ==
Park was born on October 6, 1958, in Gochang County, North Jeolla Province, South Korea. He graduated from Korea University with a degree in law.

== Political career ==
Park was elected Mayor of Ansan in 2006 with 51.23% of the popular vote, he ran under the Grand National Party. After his term as Mayor of Ansan ended in 2010, he was involved in a corruption scandal for alleged money laundering. He was sentenced to 6 years in prison and a fine of ₩130,000,000. This sentence was later overturned by the Supreme Court of Korea.

In 2019, he was appointed as Secretary-General of Onward for Future 4.0; he was the first and last Secretary-General for the short-lived party.
