= List of Swedish television ratings for 2007 =

This is a list of ratings for Swedish television in 2007. The share of the viewing for the five largest channels is listed, along with the five most watched programmes every week. Swedish television ratings are monitored by Nielsen Media Research for Mediamätning i Skandinavien using a panel of around 2600 individuals.

Week	Viewing shares					Top programmes
Week	SVT1	SVT2	TV3	TV4	Kanal5	Top programmes
1	21.7%	14.1%	10.1%	18.1%	7.5%	SVT1 - På spåret (1,800,000); SVT1 - Kommissarie Lynley (1,400,000); SVT1 - Wallenbergs (1,345,000); SVT1 - Kommissarie Lynley (1,315,000); SVT1 - Sportnytt (1,205,000)
2	20.8%	13.4%	9.4%	21.7%	8.5%	SVT1 - På spåret (2,390,000); TV4 - Let's Dance (2,180,000); SVT1 - Antikrundan (2,120,000); SVT1 - Kommissarie Lynley (1,445,000); SVT1 - Wallenbergs (1,390,000)
3	24.0%	12.4%	9.0%	19.8%	8.2%	SVT1 - På spåret (2,475,000); SVT1 - Svenska idrottsgalan 2007 (2,405,000); SVT1 - Playa del Sol (2,360,000); SVT1 - Antikrundan (2,115,000); TV4 - Let's Dance (1,915,000)
4	21.6%	14.4%	8.5%	20.3%	8.4%	SVT1 - På spåret (2,410,000); SVT1 - Antikrundan (2,000,000); TV4 - Let's Dance (1,815,000); SVT1 - Så ska det låta (1,790,000); SVT1 - Playa del Sol (1,740,000)
5	21.6%	14.3%	8.6%	20.8%	9.0%	SVT1 - Melodifestivalen 2007 (2,990,000); SVT1 - Saltön (2,385,000); SVT1 - Antikrundan (2,090,000); TV4 - Let's Dance (1,745,000); SVT1 - Så ska det låta (1,700,000)
6	21.8%	21.8%	7.6%	18.5%	7.5%	SVT1 - Melodifestivalen 2007 (3,210,000); SVT1 - Saltön (2,295,000); SVT1 - Antikrundan (1,880,000); SVT1 - Så ska det låta (1,855,000); SVT1 - Playa del Sol (1,560,000)
7	23.1%	17.3%	8.3%	19.2%	7.6%	SVT1 - Melodifestivalen 2007 (3,175,000); SVT1 - FIS Alpine World Ski Championships 2007 (2,230,000); SVT1 - Saltön (2,195,000); SVT1 - Så ska det låta (2,075,000); SVT2 - FIS Alpine World Ski Championships 2007 (2,030,000)
8	21.6%	14.6%	8.9%	21.2%	7.1%	SVT1 - Melodifestivalen 2007 (3,145,000); SVT1 - Saltön (2,330,000); SVT1 - Antikrundan (2,065,000); SVT1 - Så ska det låta (1,795,000); TV4 - Let's Dance (1,720,000)
9	23.1%	16.7%	7.4%	19.5%	7.3%	SVT1 - Melodifestivalen 2007 (3,040,000); TV4 - Let's Dance (1,900,000); SVT1 - Antikrundan (1,880,000); SVT1 - Så ska det låta (1,775,000); SVT1 - Vasaloppet (1,715,000)
10	21.8%	11.7%	8.2%	21.4%	7.5%	SVT1 - Melodifestivalen 2007 (3,975,000); SVT1 - Nöjesnytt (2,190,000); SVT1 - Antikrundan (1,810,000); SVT1 - Så ska det låta (1,725,000); TV4 - Let's Dance (1,775,000)
11	20.5%	12.9%	8.7%	21.1%	7.3%	SVT1 - Antikrundan (1,980,000); SVT1 - Så ska det låta (1,755,000); TV4 - Let's Dance (1,690,000); TV4 - Let's Dance (1,555,000); SVT1 - Masjävlar (1,495,000)
12	18.3%	13.1%	9.2%	22.8%	8.2%	TV4 - Let's Dance (1,775,000); SVT1 - Så ska det låta (1,660,000); TV4 - Let's Dance (1,630,000); SVT1 - Ordförande Persson (1,480,000); SVT1 - Ordförande Persson (1,285,000)
13	17.4%	11.6%	11.3%	23.5%	8.6%	TV4 - Let's Dance (2,130,000); TV4 - Let's Dance (1,855,000); TV4 - Hjälp! (1,490,000); SVT1 - Så ska det låta (1,430,000); SVT1 - Ordförande Persson (1,370,000)
14	16.8%	11.9%	9.1%	21.7%	9.5%	SVT1 - Så ska det låta (1,840,000); TV4 - Postkodmiljonären (1,220,000); TV4 - Äntligen hemma (1,005,000); SVT2 - I mördarens spår (975,000); TV4 - Anna Pihl (915,000)
15	16.0%	11.3%	10.2%	23.1%	10.6%	TV4 - Innan frosten (1,590,000); TV4 - Talang 2007 (1,535,000); SVT1 - Playa del Sol (1,315,000); SVT1 - Uppdrag granskning (1,135,000); TV4 - Parlamentet (1,115,000)
16	16.9%	12.9%	9.8%	22.7%	9.3%	TV4 - Talang 2007 (1,620,000); TV4 - Byfånen (1,595,000); TV4 - Postkodmiljonären (1,260,000); TV4 - Postkodmiljonären (1,235,000); TV4 - Parlamentet (950,000)
17	16.0%	12.0%	11.4%	22.5%	8.6%	TV4 - Bröderna (1,375,000); TV4 - Talang 2007 (1,315,000); TV4 - Postkodmiljonären (1,005,000); SVT1 - Hundkoll (995,000); TV4 - Postkodmiljonären (945,000)
18	14.9%	10.3%	12.6%	21.7%	8.2%	TV4 - Mörkret (1,495,000); TV4 - Talang 2007 (1,490,000); TV4 - Postkodmiljonären (1,075,000); TV4 - Postkodmiljonären (1,060,000); TV4 - Pokerfejs (1,055,000)
19	22.6%	10.1%	13.1%	20.0%	7.8%	SVT1 - Eurovision Song Contest 2007 (3,425,000); TV4 - Afrikanen (1,570,000); TV4 - Talang 2007 (1,480,000); TV4 - Postkodmiljonären (1,195,000); SVT1 - Stina! (1,145,000)
20	15.9%	11.1%	10.4%	22.0%	9.0%	TV4 - Talang 2007 (1,260,000); TV4 - Bonde söker fru (1,205,000); TV4 - Postkodmiljonären (1,155,000); TV4 - Postkodmiljonären (1,050,000); TV4 - Anna Pihl (975,000)
21	16.6%	11.6%	9.5%	22.1%	9.1%	TV4 - Talang 2007 (1,145,000); TV4 - Sommarkrysset (1,070,000); TV4 - Anna Pihl (950,000); TV4 - Postkodmiljonären (935,000); SVT1 - Hundkoll (905,000)
22	16.8%	11.3%	8.5%	21.2%	9.1%	TV4 - Talang 2007 (1,640,000); TV4 - Time Out (1,290,000); SVT1 - Sportspegeln (1,085,000); SVT1 - Doobidoo (955,000); TV4 - Postkodmiljonären (955,000)
23	15.2%	10.1%	11.2%	22.2%	9.1%	TV3 - UEFA Euro 2008 Qualifying (1,555,000); SVT1 - Sveriges nationaldag (770,000); SVT1 - Hundkoll (755,000); SVT2 - Sportnytt (730,000); SVT2 - Sveriges nationaldag (695,000)
24	16.6%	11.2%	8.6%	20.6%	8.8%	SVT1 - Sommartorpet (1,025,000); SVT1 - Doobidoo (985,000); SVT1 - Hundkoll (945,000); SVT1 - Revy-SM 2006 (925,000); SVT1 - Packat och klart (860,000)
25	19.3%	10.3%	8.0%	20.7%	7.4%	SVT1 - Sommartorpet (1,150,000); SVT1 - Packat och klart (945,000); SVT1 - Revy-SM 2006 (870,000); SVT1 - Landgång (840,000); TV4 - Hemvärn och påssjuka (795,000)
26	20.5%	10.8%	8.7%	17.9%	7.8%	SVT1 - Allsång på Skansen (2,265,000); SVT1 - Morden i Midsomer (2,005,000); SVT1 - Sommartorpet (1,090,000); SVT1 - Packat och klart (975,000); TV4 - Hemlighuset (970,000)
27	18.7%	11.4%	8.5%	20.9%	7.6%	SVT1 - Allsång på Skansen (2,120,000); SVT1 - Morden i Midsomer (1,995,000); SVT1 - Sommartorpet (1,210,000); TV4 - Beck – Hämndens pris (1,160,000); SVT1 - Packat och klart (955,000)
28	21.5%	8.5%	9.3%	19.4%	7.0%	SVT1 - Allsång på Skansen (2,190,000); SVT1 - Grattis Victoria! (1,545,000); SVT1 - IAAF Grand Prix (1,150,000); SVT1 - Sommartorpet (1,135,000); SVT1 - Packat och klart (1,085,000)
29	19.7%	9.2%	8.9%	19.9%	7.0%	SVT1 - Allsång på Skansen (1,850,000); SVT1 - Morden i Midsomer (1,750,000); SVT1 - Sommartorpet (880,000); TV4 - Miss Marple (865,000); TV4 - Beck – Kartellen (855,000)
30	19.4%	10.0%	8.4%	20.4%	7.5%	SVT1 - Allsång på Skansen (2,065,000); SVT1 - Morden i Midsomer (1,820,000); SVT1 - Sommartorpet (1,170,000); TV4 - Beck – Enslingen (1,005,000); TV4 - Bröllop & Jäkelskap (860,000)
31	19.5%	9.2%	8.2%	20.2%	7.7%	SVT1 - Allsång på Skansen (1,835,000); SVT1 - Morden i Midsomer (1,750,000); TV4 - Beck – Okänd avsändare (1,125,000); SVT1 - Sommartorpet (885,000); TV4 - Barnaskrik & Jäkelskap (885,000)
32	20.0%	9.8%	8.7%	19.8%	8.6%	SVT1 - Allsång på Skansen (1,765,000); TV4 - Beck – Annonsmannen (1,130,000); SVT1 - Athletics (1,120,000); SVT1 - DN Galan (1,075,000); SVT1 - Sportspegeln (1,040,000)
33	17.7%	9.4%	9.0%	19.3%	8.8%	SVT1 - Morden i Midsomer (1,720,000); SVT1 - Sommartorpet (1,095,000); TV4 - Beck – Pojken i glaskulan (1,005,000); SVT1 - Sportspegeln (935,000); TV4 - Sommarkrysset med Lotto (905,000)
34	19.8%	15.1%	9.2%	18.2%	8.2%	SVT1 - Morden i Midsomer (1,765,000); SVT1 - World Championships in Athletics (1,265,000); SVT2 - World Championships in Athletics (1,115,000); TV4 - Beck – Sista vittnet (1,105,000); SVT1 - World Championships in Athletics (1,055,000)
35	18.3%	20.0%	7.8%	18.5%	6.7%	SVT1 - Morden i Midsomer (1,835,000); SVT1 - World Championships in Athletics (1,385,000); TV4 - Eurovision Dance Contest (1,360,000); SVT2 - World Championships in Athletics (1,180,000); TV4 - Mord i sinnet (1,060,000)
36	17.1%	13.2%	10.4%	22.0%	6.9%	SVT1 - Doobidoo (1,505,000); TV3 - UEFA Euro 2008 qualifying (1,500,000); TV4 - Idol 2007 (1,395,000); TV4 - House M.D. (1,020,000); TV4 - Söderkåkar (985,000)
37	16.8%	12.5%	9.3%	24.6%	6.9%	SVT1 - Svensson, Svensson (1,930,000); SVT1 - Doobidoo (1,680,000); SVT1 - Babben & Co (1,600,000); TV4 - Idol 2007 (1,420,000); TV4 - Idol 2007 (1,285,000); TV4 - Idol 2007 (1,285,000)
38	16.7%	12.2%	9.3%	23.6%	8.0%	SVT1 - Svensson, Svensson (1,790,000); SVT1 - Babben & Co (1,480,000); SVT1 - Doobidoo (1,475,000); TV4 - Idol 2007 (1,390,000); TV4 - Idol 2007 (1,370,000)
39	18.2%	11.2%	8.5%	23.6%	7.8%	SVT1 - Svensson, Svensson (1,785,000); SVT1 - Babben & Co (1,630,000); SVT1 - Doobidoo (1,590,000); TV4 - Idol 2007 (1,200,000); TV4 - Idol 2007 (1,190,000)
40	17.8%	11.6%	9.7%	21.8%	8.5%	SVT1 - Svensson, Svensson (1,360,000); TV4 - Idol 2007 (1,360,000); SVT1 - Doobidoo (1,355,000); TV4 - Bonde söker fru (1,330,000); SVT1 - Babben & Co (1,300,000)
41	17.6%	11.2%	10.4%	22.5%	8.6%	SVT1 - Doobidoo (1,460,000); TV4 - Idol 2007 (1,410,000); TV4 - Bonde söker fru (1,370,000); TV4 - Postkodmiljonären (1,170,000); SVT1 - Tillsammans för världens barn (1,115,000)
42	17.0%	11.0%	11.1%	21.2%	9.1%	SVT1 - Doobidoo (1,635,000); SVT1 - Babben & Co (1,570,000); SVT1 - Svensson, Svensson (1,550,000); TV4 - Bonde söker fru (1,280,000); TV4 - Idol 2007 (1,240,000)
43	17.7%	12.4%	10.0%	21.1%	8.7%	SVT1 - Doobidoo (1,790,000); SVT1 - Svensson, Svensson (1,530,000); SVT1 - Babben & Co (1,480,000); TV4 - Bonde söker fru (1,315,000); TV4 - Idol 2007 (1,235,000)
44	17.1%	11.1%	9.9%	22.4%	8.2%	SVT1 - Doobidoo (1,690,000); SVT1 - Isprinsessan (1,665,000); SVT1 - Svensson, Svensson (1,490,000); TV4 - Bonde söker fru (1,475,000); TV4 - Idol 2007 (1,430,000)
45	17.7%	12.3%	10.0%	22.4%	8.1%	SVT1 - Doobidoo (1,790,000); TV4 - Bonde söker fru (1,490,000); SVT1 - Isprinsessan (1,485,000); SVT1 - Svensson, Svensson (1,470,000); SVT1 - Babben & Co (1,425,000)
46	17.3%	11.2%	9.5%	22.5%	9.2%	SVT1 - Doobidoo (1,875,000); SVT1 - Svensson, Svensson (1,645,000); SVT1 - Predikanten (1,565,000); SVT1 - Babben & Co (1,535,000); TV4 - Bonde söker fru (1,495,000)
47	16.1%	12.4%	11.3%	22.4%	8.5%	SVT1 - Doobidoo (1,850,000); TV3 - UEFA Euro 2008 Qualifying (1,675,000); TV4 - Idol 2007 (1,430,000); SVT1 - Predikanten (1,370,000); TV4 - Bonde söker fru (1,295,000)
48	17.6%	11.9%	8.7%	22.9%	8.6%	SVT1 - På spåret (2,150,000); SVT1 - Svensson, Svensson (1,625,000); SVT1 - Babben & Co (1,565,000); TV4 - Bonde söker fru (1,490,000); TV4 - Van Veeteren - Fallet G (1,430,000)
49	18.3%	13.9%	9.1%	20.6%	8.9%	SVT1 - På spåret (2,060,000); TV4 - Idol 2007 (1,930,000); SVT1 - Svensson, Svensson (1,570,000); SVT1 - Babben & Co (1,535,000); TV4 - Fredag Hela Veckan (1,400,000)
50	17.7%	13.6%	8.5%	23.9%	8.0%	SVT1 - På spåret (2,260,000); TV4 - Bonde söker fru (1,580,000); SVT1 - Svensson, Svensson (1,525,000); TV4 - Bonde söker fru (1,405,000); SVT1 - Babben & Co (1,335,000); TV4 - Nobelbanketten (1,335,000)
51	19.0%	11.3%	8.6%	22.3%	8.0%	SVT1 - På spåret (2,410,000); TV4 - Bonde söker fru (1,735,000); SVT1 - Svensson, Svensson (1,725,000); SVT1 - Babben & Co (1,700,000); TV4 - Bingolotto (1,310,000)
52	25.4%	10.9%	8.6%	17.8%	7.3%	SVT1 - Kalle Anka och hans vänner önskar God Jul (3,490,000); SVT1 - På spåret (2,215,000); SVT1 - Pyramiden (1,740,000); SVT1 - Stjärnorna på slottet (1,495,000); SVT1 - Kan du vissla Johanna? (1,425,000)
