= List of Swedish television ratings for 2006 =

This is a list of ratings for Swedish television in 2006. The share of the viewing for the five largest channels is listed, along with the five most watched programmes every week. Swedish television ratings are monitored by Nielsen Media Research for Mediamätning i Skandinavien using a panel of around 2600 individuals.

Week	Viewing shares					Top programmes
Week	SVT1	SVT2	TV3	TV4	Kanal5	Top programmes
1	28.1%	14.3%	9.0%	17.8%	9.0%	SVT1 - På spåret (1,985,000); SVT1 - Hemvärnets glada dagar (1,955,000); SVT1 - Kommissare Lynley (1,845,000); SVT1 - Stjärnorna på slottet (1,715,000); SVT1 - Stjärnorna på slottet (1,710,000)
2	22.7%	15.9%	8.7%	20.2%	9.5%	SVT1 - På spåret (2,595,000); SVT1 - Nisse Hults historiska snedsteg (1,645,000); SVT1 - Stjärnorna på slottet (1,565,000); SVT1 - Stjärnorna på slottet (1,560,000); TV4 - Let's Dance (1,555,000)
3	26.5%	15.1%	8.6%	18.8%	8.7%	SVT1 - På spåret (2,525,000); SVT1 - Svenska idrottsgalan 2006 (2,370,000); TV4 - Let's Dance (1,900,000); SVT1 - Mat/Tina (1,505,000); SVT1 - Nisse Hults historiska snedsteg (1,285,000)
4	21.2%	15.9%	9.9%	21.0%	9.7%	SVT1 - På spåret (2,380,000); SVT1 - Antikrundan (1,980,000); TV4 - Let's Dance (1,925,000); SVT1 - Djursjukhuset (1,425,000); SVT1 - Postkodmiljonären (1,295,000)
5	23.8%	16.2%	8.9%	20.6%	9.7%	SVT1 - På spåret (2,450,000); TV4 - Let's Dance (1,860,000); SVT1 - Antikrundan (1,830,000); SVT1 - Djursjukhuset (1,550,000); SVT1 - Guldbaggen 2006 (1,395,000)
6	25.4%	18.6%	8.4%	18.1%	8.9%	SVT1 - På spåret (2,510,000); SVT1 - 2006 Winter Olympics Opening Ceremony (2,100,000); SVT1 - Antikrundan (1,885,000); SVT1 - Djursjukhuset (1,515,000); TV4 - Let's Dance (1,460,000)
7	29.8%	28.6%	6.4%	13.8%	6.1%	SVT1 - Melodifestivalen 2006 (3,045,000); SVT1 - 2006 Winter Olympics Men's ice hockey Sweden-United States (2,470,000); SVT2 - 2006 Winter Olympics Men's ice hockey Sweden-United States (2,295,000); SVT2 - 2006 Winter Olympics Studio (2,080,000); SVT1 - 2006 Winter Olympics Women's ice hockey Sweden-United States (2,015,000)
8	27.2%	33.3%	5.8%	12.9%	5.7%	SVT2 - 2006 Winter Olympics Men's ice hockey Sweden-Finland (3,520,000); SVT2 - 2006 Winter Olympics Men's ice hockey Sweden-Finland (3,310,000); SVT2 - 2006 Winter Olympics Studio (3,210,000); SVT2 - 2006 Winter Olympics Studio (3,035,000); SVT2 - 2006 Winter Olympics Studio (2,885,000)
9	24.3%	17.3%	9.7%	19.7%	8.8%	SVT1 - Melodifestivalen 2006 (3,110,000); SVT2 - Vasaloppet (2,140,000); SVT1 - Så ska det låta (2,050,000); SVT1 - Antikrundan (1,975,000); SVT1 - Vasaloppet (1,800,000)
10	24.4%	14.5%	8.5%	21.0%	8.5%	SVT1 - Melodifestivalen 2006 (3,645,000); SVT1 - Tv-huset (2,140,000); TV4 - Let's Dance (1,970,000); SVT1 - Antikrundan (1,830,000); SVT1 - Stopptid (1,640,000)
11	26.0%	15.3%	8.8%	19.4%	8.3%	SVT1 - Melodifestivalen 2006 (4,240,000); SVT1 - Så ska det låta (1,995,000); SVT1 - Antikrundan (1,835,000); SVT1 - Melodifestivalen 2006 Dagen efter (1,605,000); SVT1 - Sportnytt (1,400,000)
12	22.4%	13.3%	9.2%	21.4%	9.3%	SVT1 - Så ska det låta (2,085,000); SVT1 - Antikrundan (1,930,000); SVT1 - Högsta domstolen (1,400,000); TV4 - Äntligen hemma (1,305,000); TV4 - Postkodmiljonären (1,245,000)
13	21.7%	12.4%	9.4%	23.9%	9.3%	SVT1 - Så ska det låta (2,035,000); SVT1 - Antikrundan (1,735,000); SVT1 - Möbelhandlarens dotter (1,495,000); SVT1 - Högsta domstolen (1,400,000); TV4 - Postkodmiljonären (1,350,000)
14	20.0%	12.5%	10.6%	23.7%	9.3%	SVT1 - Så ska det låta (2,190,000); TV4 - Postkodmiljonären (1,410,000); SVT1 - Möbelhandlarens dotter (1,330,000); TV4 - Deal or No Deal (1,320,000); SVT1 - Högsta domstolen (1,240,000)
15	18.5%	12.9%	9.8%	25.5%	10.2%	SVT1 - Så ska det låta (1,910,000); TV4 - Swedish Ice hockey Championship (1,395,000); TV4 - Swedish Ice hockey Championship (1,230,000); SVT1 - Möbelhandlarens dotter (1,150,000); TV4 - Swedish Ice hockey Championship (1,140,000)
16	19.1%	13.0%	10.1%	24.6%	10.5%	SVT1 - Så ska det låta (2,030,000); TV4 - Swedish Ice hockey Championship (1,255,000); TV4 - Parlamentet (1,225,000); SVT1 - Möbelhandlarens dotter (1,125,000); TV4 - Postkodmiljonären (1,105,000)
17	20.3%	14.6%	9.4%	22.1%	10.6%	SVT1 - Så ska det låta (1,990,000); TV4 - Postkodmiljonären (1,150,000); TV4 - Deal or No Deal (1,150,000); SVT1 - Möbelhandlarens dotter (1,140,000); SVT1 - Plus (1,125,000)
18	19.8%	13.1%	10.9%	23.2%	10.4%	SVT1 - Så ska det låta (1,765,000); TV4 - Äntligen hemma (1,075,000); SVT1 - Josefsson (975,000); SVT1 - Ice hockey Euro Tour (940,000); SVT1 - Möbelhandlarens dotter (935,000)
19	19.8%	11.7%	13.1%	21.9%	10.4%	SVT1 - Så ska det låta (1,640,000); TV4 - Postkodmiljonären (1,115,000); TV4 - Deal or No Deal (1,095,000); SVT1 - Möbelhandlarens dotter (1,060,000); TV4 - Postkodmiljonären (960,000); TV4 - Bad Company (960,000)
20	28.0%	11.1%	13.2%	18.0%	8.2%	SVT1 - Eurovision Song Contest 2006 (3,285,000); SVT1 - Eurovision Song Contest 2006 Semi Final (2,645,000); SVT1 - Så ska det låta (1,895,000); TV3 - 2006 World Ice Hockey Championships Sweden-Czech Republic (1,815,000); SVT1 - Josefsson (1,225,000)
21	17.1%	13.0%	11.3%	22.2%	10.6%	TV4 - Deal or No Deal (1,220,000); SVT1 - Krönikan (1,090,000); SVT1 - Plus (1,080,000); TV4 - Postkodmiljonären (1,050,000); SVT1 - Josefsson (1,035,000)
22	17.9%	11.7%	10.7%	24.4%	9.5%	TV4 - Matchen (1,590,000); SVT1 - Vi hade i alla fall tur med vädret (1,130,000); TV3 - Football (1,085,000); SVT1 - Krøniken (1,070,000); TV4 - Postkodmiljonären (945,000)
23	19.2%	15.8%	9.2%	22.7%	9.8%	SVT2 - FIFA World Cup Sweden-Trinidad and Tobago (2,390,000); SVT2 - FIFA World Cup Studio (2,020,000); SVT1 - FIFA World Cup Sweden-Trinidad and Tobago (1,715,000); SVT2 - Nationaldagen (1,145,000); SVT2 - Sportnytt (1,030,000); TV4 - FIFA World Cup Poland-Ecuador (1,030,000)
24	19.0%	16.2%	8.3%	28.2%	8.8%	TV4 - FIFA World Cup Sweden-Paraguay (2,950,000); TV4 - FIFA World Cup Brazil-Croatia (1,470,000); SVT1 - FIFA World Cup Germany-Poland (1,385,000); SVT2 - FIFA World Cup England-Trinidad and Tobago (1,360,000); SVT2 - FIFA World Cup Italy-Ghana (1,340,000)
25	23.1%	13.0%	8.0%	26.5%	8.5%	SVT1 - FIFA World Cup Sweden-England (3,285,000); SVT1 - FIFA World Cup Studio (2,850,000); TV4 - FIFA World Cup Sweden-Germany (2,685,000); SVT2 - FIFA World Cup England-Ecuador (1,455,000); SVT1 - FIFA World Cup The Netherland-Argentina (1,440,000)
26	20.1%	14.0%	8.6%	25.5%	8.7%	SVT1 - Allsång på Skansen (2,180,000); SVT2 - FIFA World Cup Germany-Argentina (1,650,000); SVT1 - FIFA World Cup Germany-Argentina (1,550,000); TV4 - FIFA World Cup Spain-France (1,495,000); SVT2 - FIFA World Cup The Brazil-France (1, 000)
27	19.1%	11.2%	8.8%	27.2%	9.7%	TV4 - FIFA World Cup Italy-France (2,930,000); TV4 - FIFA World Cup Italy-France (2,685,000); TV4 - FIFA World Cup Italy-France (2,535,000); TV4 - FIFA World Cup Italy-France (2,015,000); SVT1 - FIFA World Cup Portugal-France (1,900,000)
28	21.1%	10.2%	9.9%	23.0%	9.1%	SVT1 - Allsång på Skansen (1,830,000); SVT1 - Morden i Midsomer (1,605,000); SVT1 - Grattis Victoria! (1,225,000); SVT1 - Otroligt antikt (855,000); TV4 - Miss Marple (850,000)
29	20.3%	11.7%	9.6%	21.7%	9.2%	SVT1 - Allsång på Skansen (2,015,000); SVT1 - Morden i Midsomer (1,500,000); TV4 - Miss Marple (870,000); SVT1 - Otroligt antikt (815,000); SVT1 - Sportnytt (750,000)
30	19.8%	10.1%	11.8%	21.1%	9.6%	SVT1 - Allsång på Skansen (1,285,000); SVT1 - DN Galan (910,000); SVT1 - Sportspegeln (800,000); SVT1 - Otroligt antikt (790,000); TV4 - Miss Marple (760,000)
31	22.8%	10.7%	10.1%	22.2%	8.7%	SVT1 - Allsång på Skansen (1,990,000); SVT1 - Morden i Midsomer (1,715,000); SVT1 - 2006 European Championships in Athletics Opening (1,170,000); TV4 - Miss Marple (985,000); SVT1 - Otroligt antikt (960,000)
32	30.5%	20.9%	8.0%	15.2%	6.4%	SVT1 - 2006 European Championships in Athletics (2,050,000); SVT2 - 2006 European Championships in Athletics (2,045,000); SVT2 - 2006 European Championships in Athletics (1,905,000); SVT2 - 2006 European Championships in Athletics (1,850,000); SVT1 - 2006 European Championships in Athletics (1,795,000)
33	17.9%	10.2%	10.9%	23.4%	9.2%	SVT1 - Morden i Midsomer (1,755,000); TV4 - Beck – Mannen utan ansikte (1,145,000); TV4 - Miss Marple (1,110,000); TV4 - Otroligt antikt (1,080,000); SVT1 - Foktoppen (995,000); TV4 - Golden League (995,000)
34	19.7%	14.2%	9.7%	21.2%	9.6%	SVT1 - Morden i Midsomer (1,630,000); SVT1 - Finnkampen (1,075,000); TV4 - Beck – Kartellen (1,065,000); SVT1 - Utfrågningen (1,010,000); TV4 - Miss Marple (1,000,000)
35	18.7%	11.7%	10.3%	25.3%	9.5%	SVT1 - Morden i Midsomer (1,730,000); TV4 - Idol 2006 (1,380,000); SVT1 - Utfrågningen (1,195,000); TV4 - Beck – Enslingen (1,165,000); TV4 - Idol 2006 (1,155,000)
36	17.7%	11.8%	10.9%	24.8%	9.5%	SVT1 - Morden i Midsomer (1,620,000); TV4 - Idol 2006 (1,390,000); TV4 - Idol 2006 (1,315,000); TV4 - Idol 2006 (1,305,000); TV4 - Idol 2006 (1,200,000)
37	23.6%	10.9%	9.3%	23.8%	9.4%	SVT1 - Election coverage (2,355,000); SVT1 - Morden i Midsomer (1,625,000); TV4 - Idol 2006 (1,450,000); SVT1 - Slutdebatten (1,275,000); SVT1 - Tinas kök (1,270,000)
38	19.2%	12.9%	8.9%	24.9%	9.6%	SVT1 - Doobidoo (1,460,000); SVT1 - Hem till byn (1,435,000); SVT1 - Mäklarna (1,360,000); TV4 - Idol 2006 (1,245,000); TV4 - Beck – Annonsmannen (1,220,000)
39	20.0%	12.1%	9.9%	24.5%	8.7%	SVT1 - Doobidoo (1,425,000); TV4 - Beck – Pojken i glaskulan (1,310,000); SVT1 - Hem till byn (1,285,000); SVT1 - Mäklarna (1,280,000); TV4 - Postkosmiljonären (1,260,000)
40	17.5%	12.8%	10.5%	26.3%	8.5%	TV4 - Bonde söker fru (1,480,000); TV4 - Hey Baberiba (1,360,000); TV4 - Idol 2006 (1,355,000); SVT1 - Hem till byn (1,345,000); TV4 - Beck – Sista vittnet (1,345,000)
41	19.1%	12.6%	10.2%	24.4%	9.0%	SVT1 - Hem till byn (1,365,000); TV4 - Idol 2006 (1,335,000); TV4 - Bonde söker fru (1,315,000); TV4 - Hey Baberiba (1,280,000); SVT1 - Mäklarna (1,235,000)
42	20.4%	12.4%	9.0%	24.7%	8.4%	SVT1 - Välkommen på 50-årsfest! (1,965,000); TV4 - Bonde söker fru (1,520,000); SVT1 - Doobidoo (1,480,000); TV4 - Hey Baberiba (1,395,000); SVT1 - Hem till byn (1,385,000); TV4 - Postkodmiljonären (1,385,000)
43	19.7%	13.5%	8.9%	25.6%	8.3%	SVT1 - På spåret (1,995,000); SVT1 - Doobidoo (1,700,000); TV4 - Bonde söker fru (1,560,000); TV4 - Idol 2006 (1,490,000); SVT1 - Hem till byn (1,475,000)
44	20.5%	12.6%	9.0%	24.0%	8.7%	SVT1 - Doobidoo (1,820,000); TV4 - Bonde söker fru (1,780,000); SVT1 - På spåret (1,715,000); TV4 - Postkodmiljonären (1,450,000); SVT1 - Tinas kök (1,320,000)
45	19.3%	14.6%	9.6%	23.4%	8.7%	SVT1 - På spåret (1,875,000); SVT1 - Doobidoo (1,780,000); TV4 - Bonde söker fru (1,500,000); TV4 - Postkodmiljonären (1,405,000); TV4 - Postkodmiljonären (1,225,000)
46	19.8%	12.8%	9.6%	24.6%	8.4%	SVT1 - På spåret (1,915,000); SVT1 - Doobidoo (1,740,000); TV4 - Bonde söker fru (1,580,000); TV4 - Postkodmiljonären (1,420,000); TV4 - Postkodmiljonären (1,370,000)
47	17.7%	12.6%	10.0%	25.0%	8.9%	SVT1 - Doobidoo (1,640,000); TV4 - Bonde söker fru (1,580,000); TV4 - Idol 2006 (1,490,000); TV4 - Postkodmiljonären (1,385,000); TV4 - Hey Baberiba (1,315,000)
48	19.7%	13.2%	9.3%	25.3%	7.9%	SVT1 - På spåret (2,120,000); TV4 - Idol 2006 (2,000,000); TV4 - Idol 2006 (1,620,000); TV4 - Bonde söker fru (1,620,000); TV4 - Bonde söker fru (1,570,000)
49	20.1%	14.6%	9.7%	21.5%	9.0%	SVT1 - På spåret (2,200,000); SVT1 - Doobidoo (2,015,000); TV4 - Bonde söker fru (1,660,000); TV4 - Postkodmiljonären (1,340,000); SVT2 - Nobel Prize Banquet (1,335,000)
50	19.7%	13.8%	9.9%	22.4%	8.1%	SVT1 - Doobidoo (1,820,000); SVT1 - På spåret (1,740,000); TV4 - Bonde söker fru (1,605,000); SVT1 - Sportnytt (1,230,000); SVT1 - Mäklarna (1,180,000)
51	24.6%	13.3%	8.7%	23.6%	7.5%	SVT1 - Kalle Anka och hans vänner önskar God Jul (3,610,000); SVT1 - Doobidoo (2,245,000); TV4 - Bonde söker fru (1,690,000); SVT1 - På spåret (1,650,000); SVT1 - Rapport Space Extra (1,550,000)
52	22.8%	12.6%	8.5%	21.1%	8.0%	SVT1 - På spåret (1,920,000); SVT1 - Året med kungafamiljen (1,675,000); TV4 - Bonde söker fru - The Wedding (1,625,000); SVT1 - Kommissarie Lynley (1,610,000); SVT1 - Snapphanar (1,595,000)
