= Eugen Marcus =

German silversmith

Eugen Marcus was a German silversmith. He designed tea and coffee sets, jewelry boxes, wine coolers, and silverware. His work has been auctioned by Bonhams, Christie's, Dorotheum, and Sotheby's.
