= Göteborgs Auktionsverk =

Swedish auction house

- Industry: Auction
- Founded: 1681
- Headquarters: Värmlandsgatan 2, S-413 28 Gothenburg, Sweden
- Website: www.goteborgsauktionsverk.se

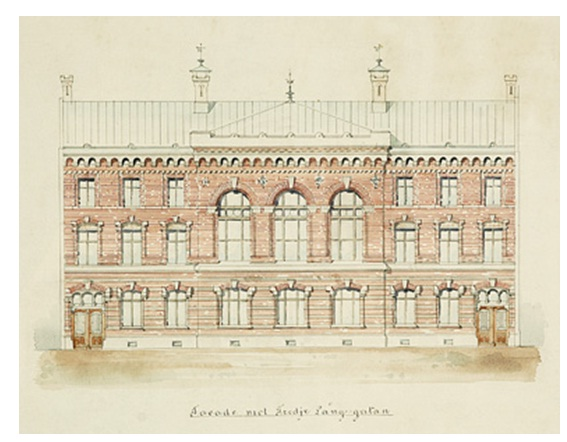
Göteborgs Auktionsverk

Göteborgs Auktionsverk is an auction house founded in 1681, when the magistrate in Gothenburg sought permission from the government to conduct the auction business. It is the world's second-oldest auction house still in operation after the Stockholm Auction House founded in 1674. The auctions relate antiques, art, modern design, and crafts.

== History ==
Until 1733 the auctions were held in the town hall at Gustav Adolf Square. After this, the Göteborgs Auktionsverk moved to:

- Smedjebacken 7,
- in 1892 to Länsisatamankatu 15,
- Tredje Långgatan 7-9, where the auctions were until January 2014.

Tredje Långgatan 7-9 is one of the oldest buildings in the world dedicated to the auction business. The building was designed by city architect Carl Fahlström and built in 1890-92. From a cultural and historical perspective, the house is interesting because it is unique in its kind. Gothenburg City ran the auction work, until 1999.

Göteborgs Auktionsverk since January 2014 is in new building on Värmlandsgatan 2 in Gothenburg.

== Today ==
Gothenburg's Auction House is privately owned and is part of Provobisgruppen. It holds daily online auctions and Quality Auctions in autumn and spring.

== See also ==
- List of oldest fine art auction houses
- List of oldest companies
