= Josephson =

Josephson is a patronymic surname meaning "son of Joseph". Notable people with the surname include:

- Andy Josephson (born 1964), American lawyer and politician
- Brian David Josephson (born 1940), Welsh physicist
- Duane Josephson (1942–1997), American baseball player
- Erland Josephson (1923–2012), Swedish actor and author
- Erik Josephson (1864–1929), Swedish architect
- Ernst Josephson (1851–1906), Swedish painter
- Ian Josephson, Canadian judge
- Julien Josephson (1881–1959), American motion picture screenwriter
- Karen Josephson (born 1964), American swimmer
- Les Josephson (1942–2020), American football player
- Mark Josephson (1943–2017), American cardiac electrophysiologist
- Matthew Josephson (1899–1978), American journalist and author
- Samantha Josephson (died 2019), American murder victim
- Sarah Josephson (born 1964), American swimmer
- Timothy Josephson, American politician
- Mark Josephson (entrepreneur) (born 1972), American entrepreneur and Executive coach

== See also ==
- Josephson effect, used in quantum-mechanical circuits, with related terms:
  - Josephson energy
  - Josephson penetration depth
  - Josephson vortex
  - Pi Josephson junction
- Josefsson
- Hans Josephsohn (1920–2012), Swiss sculptor
