= Lisa Keller (politician) =

American politician

Member-elect of the Alaska House of Representatives from the 13th district
- Assuming office January 2027
- Succeeding: Andy Josephson

Personal details
- Party: Democratic

Lisa Keller is an American politician. A member of the Democratic Party, she is the member-elect for the 13th district of the Alaska House of Representatives.
