= Andy Josephson =

American politician (born 1964)

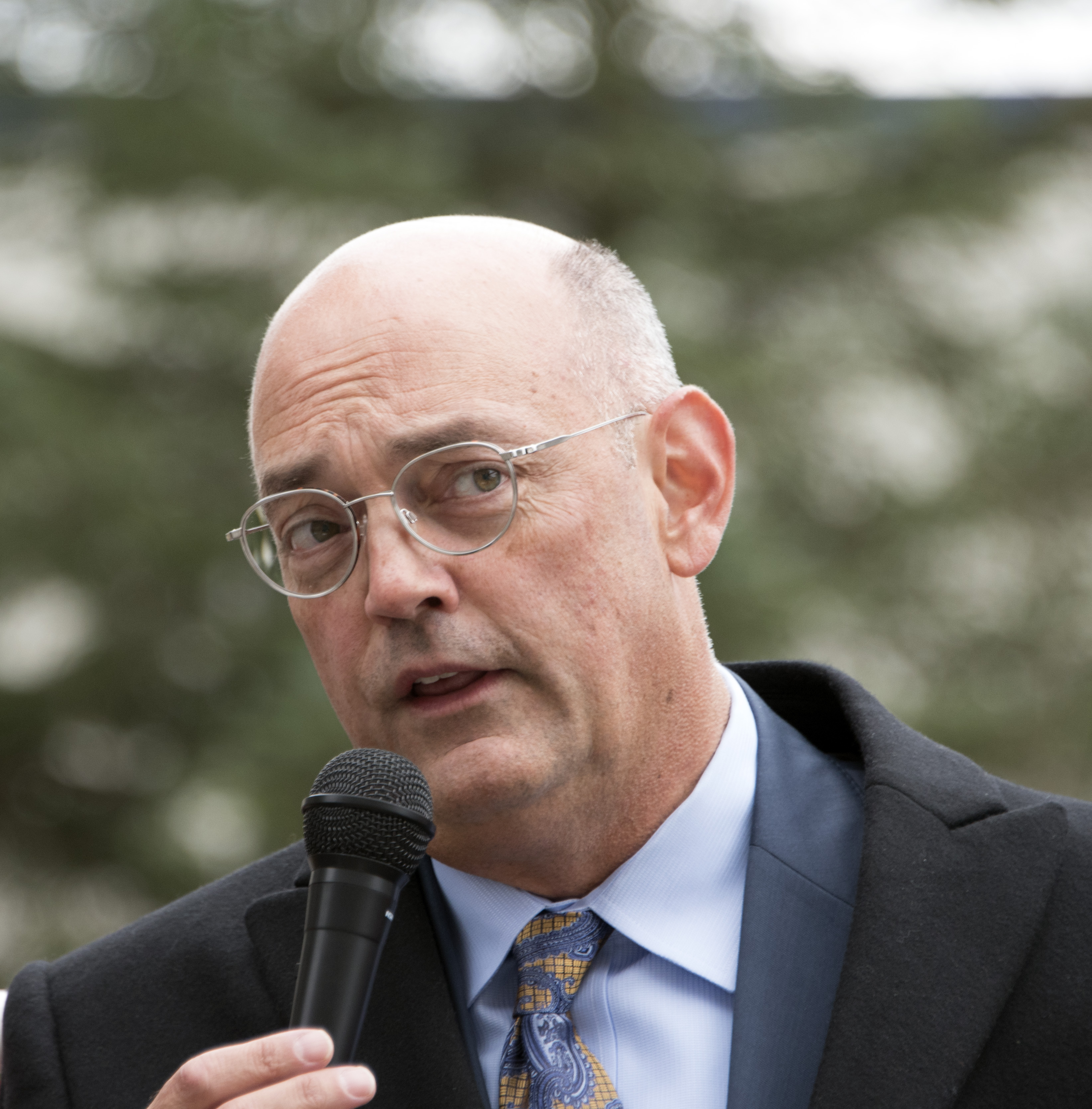
- Andy Josephson speaking in front of the Alaska State Capitol in January 2020

Member of the Alaska House of Representatives
- Incumbent
- Assumed office January 15, 2013
- Preceded by: Mark Neuman
- Succeeded by: Lisa Keller (elect)
- Constituency: 15th district (2013–2023); 13th district (2023–present)

Personal details
- Born: Andrew Lewis Josephson; July 15, 1964 (age 62) Anchorage, Alaska, U.S.
- Party: Democratic
- Spouse: Donna
- Education: Whitman College; University of Alaska, Anchorage; Pennsylvania State; University, Carlisle
- Website: House website

Andrew Lewis Josephson (born July 15, 1964) is a member of the Alaska House of Representatives. He is a member of the Democratic Party.

== Personal life and education ==
Josephson graduated from Whitman College in 1986 with a bachelor's degree in history. He also earned a master's degree in teaching from the University of Alaska Anchorage in 1992 and a JD from Penn State in 1997. He has spent almost his entire life in Alaska, mostly in Anchorage. Josephson's excellent tennis game keeps him ranked high in the Alaska House Tennis Caucus.

== Career ==
Josephson served as an intern for Senator Ted Stevens. He also worked as a legislative aide and a teacher. He worked as an assistant district attorney in Kotzebue, Alaska from 1999 to 2001, before going into private practice. Josephson was elected to the Alaska House of Representatives in 2012.

== Electoral history ==
=== 2024 ===
==== Primary ====
2024 Nonpartisan primary
Party	Candidate	Votes	%
Democratic	Andy Josephson (incumbent)	990	56.0
Republican	Heather Gottshall	777	44.0
Total votes		1,767	100.0

==== General ====
2024 Alaska House of Representatives election, District 13
Party	Candidate	Votes	%
Democratic	Andy Josephson (incumbent)	3,743	53.3
Republican	Heather Gottshall	3,266	46.5
Write-in		15	0.2
Total votes		7,024	100.0
Democratic hold			
