= Jonas von Essen =

Memory sports player

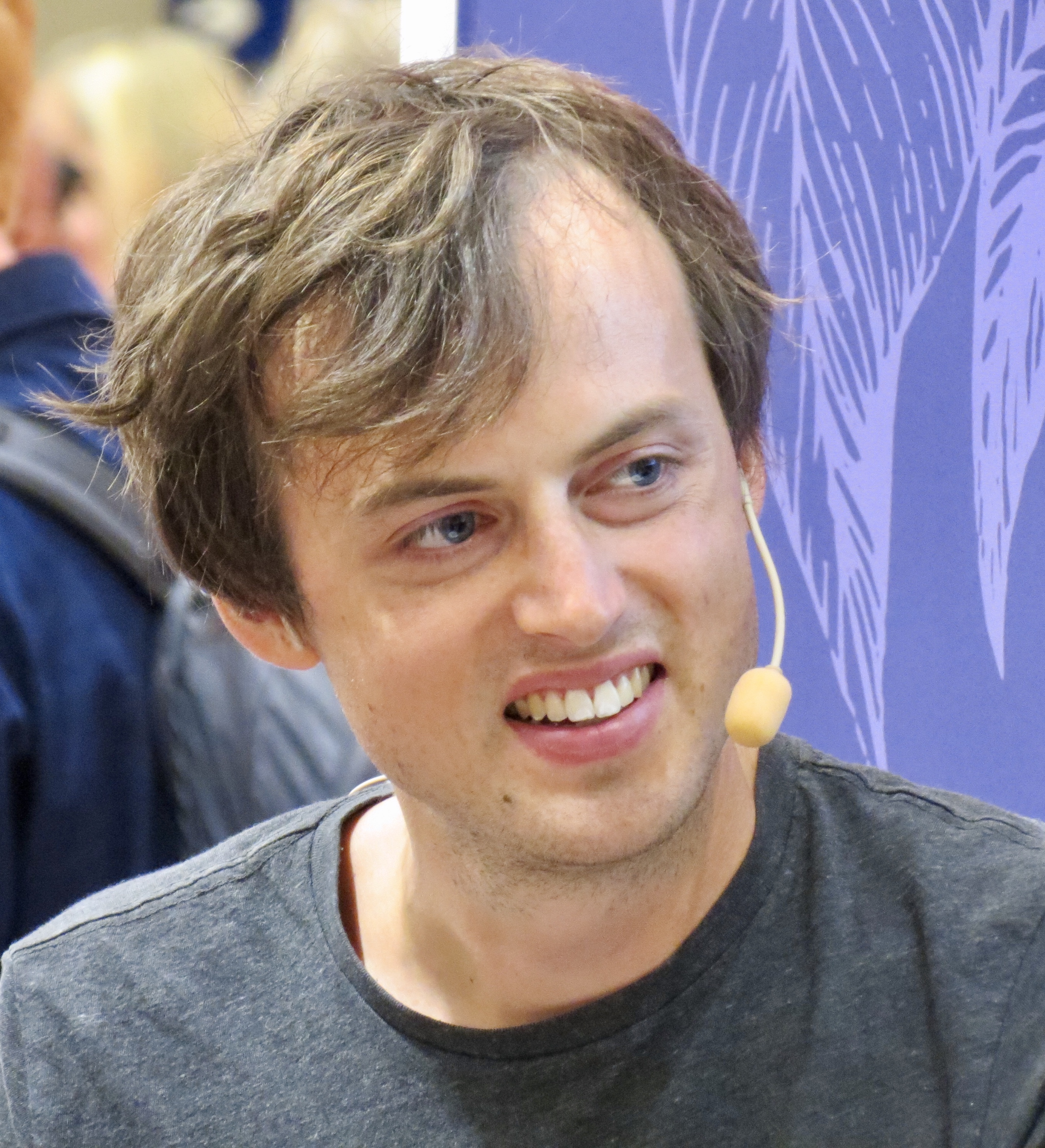
- von Essen in 2019
- Born: Sven Christer Jonas von Essen; 24 April 1991 (age 35); Skövde, Sweden
- Family: von Essen

Baron Sven Christer Jonas von Essen (born 24 April 1991) is a Swedish two-time world memory champion. He was a memory sports player from 2012 to 2015. In April 2019 he co-founded memoryOS, an ed-tech startup developing memory improvement software.

== Biography ==
He came in third behind eternal runner-up Simon "Charles Barkley of Memory" Reinhard) in the 21st World Memory Championships in December 2012. He won the 22nd World Memory Championships in December 2013, and the 24th World Memory Championships in December 2014.

On 12 March 2016, he recalled correctly 13,208 digits of memorized pi in 4 hours and 40 minutes according to the Pi World Ranking List. This was a Swedish record until 2019, when it was beaten by Henrik Lilliestråle.

In the spring of 2018, he participated in TV4's Talang. In his audition, he memorized the first names of all 500 people in the audience, which led to David Batra giving him his golden buzzer and thus sending him on directly to the final.

On 7 March 2020, he recalled 24,063 digits of pi, setting a new personal, Swedish, and European record. His aim was to recall the first 100,000 digits but he made a mistake on the 24,064th. Three days later he became the first person to pass the "Olympus Mons of Memory Tests", being tested on samples from the first 100,000 digits. A random sequence of nine digits were read out and Jonas recalled the nine digits preceding and following these. This was repeated 50 times in a row without error to complete the challenge.

In the winter of 2023, he participated in TV4's Postkodmiljonären. He answered the final question correctly and won 1,000,000 kronor in the show.

He is a member of the Swedish noble Essen family and is thus a baron.

== See also ==
- Extreme Memory Tournament
- The Brain (game show)
