= Uppsala Auktionskammare =

Swedish auction house

- Industry: Auction
- Founded: 1731
- Headquarters: Sweden
- Key people: Magnus Bexhed
- Website: www.uppsalaauktion.se/en/

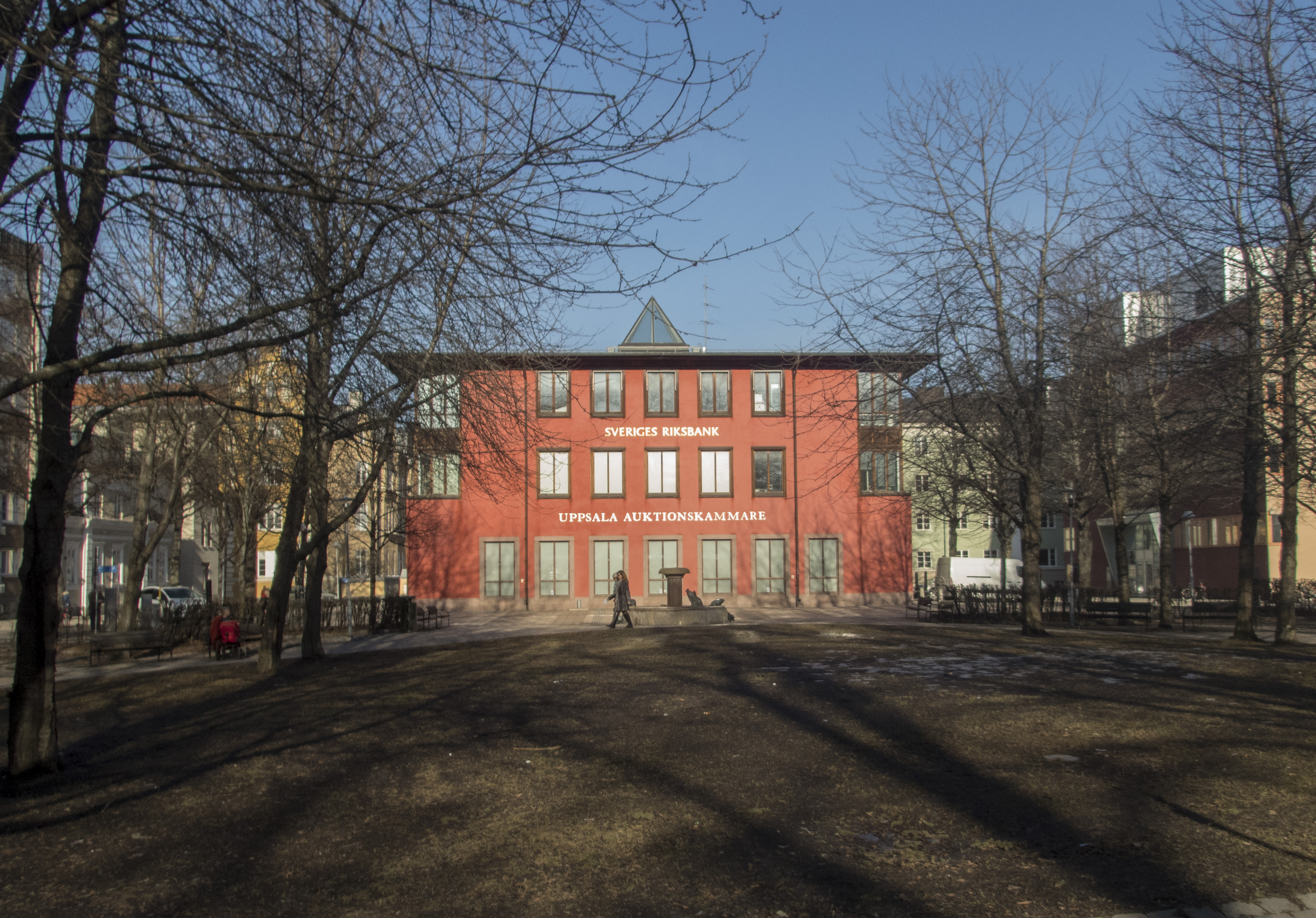
Uppsala auktionskammare

Uppsala Auktionskammare was founded in 1731 and is the third oldest auction house in the world after Stockholms Auktionsverk and before Sotheby's. It is also the third largest auction house in Sweden and organizes international quality auctions with Dutch & Flemish Old Masters, Russian, and Chinese art.

In 1996, it was taken over by Knut Knutson and former employees.

In 2009, it acquired the Crafoord auctions in Lund. The company has offices in Stockholm, Gothenburg, and Uppsala.

Magnus Bexhed has been the president since 2011.

== See also ==
- List of oldest fine art auction houses
