= List of oldest fine art auction houses =

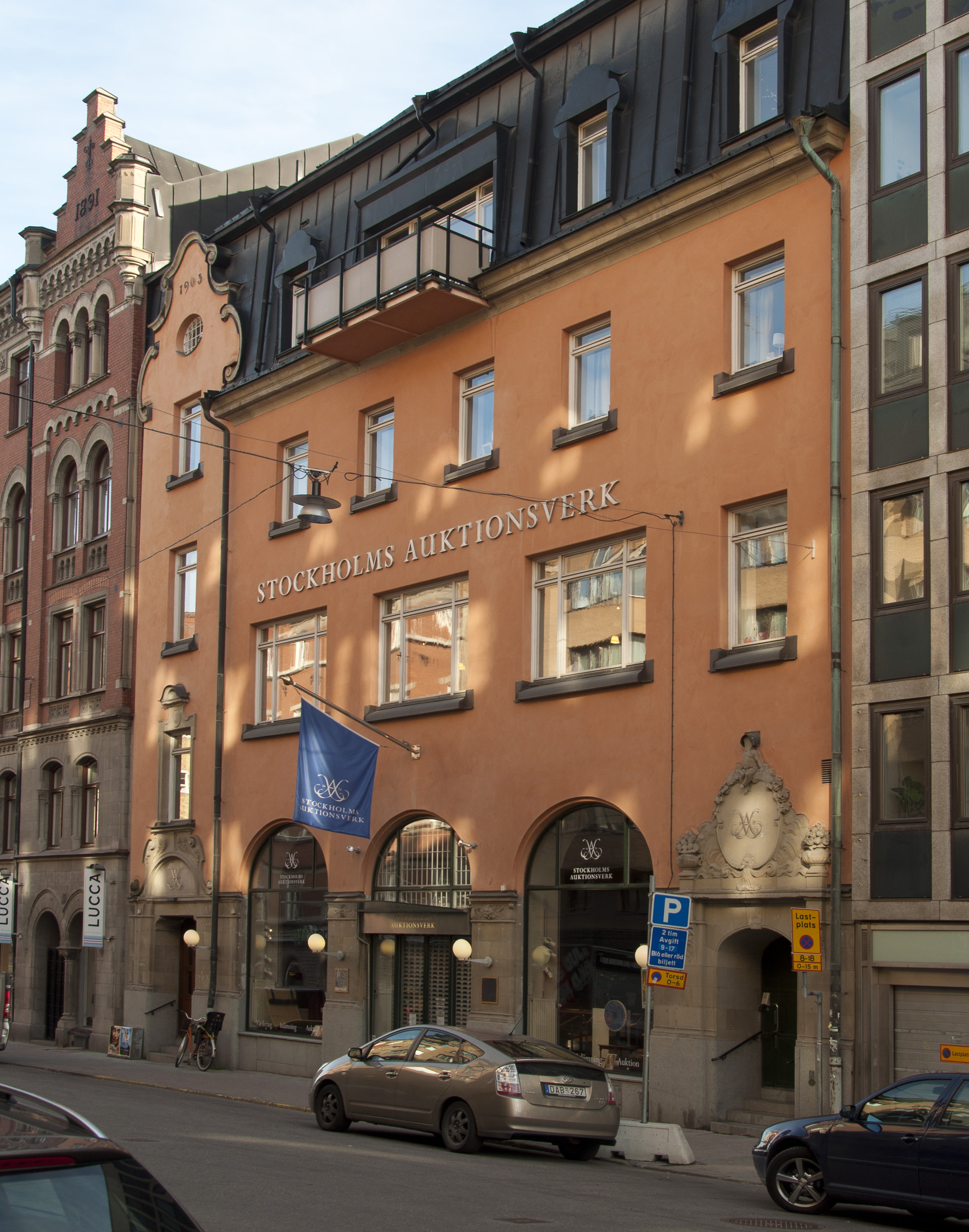
Stockholms Auktionsverk, the oldest continuously operating fine art auction house.

This list includes auction houses that are principally engaged in the sale of fine art, antiques, decorative arts, private collections or related categories, that remain in operation.

They must operate as an identifiable auction business rather than solely as an occasional sales venue, local authority, dealer or online marketplace. The founding date does not necessarily indicate the year in which the firm first began auctioning fine art. Some auction houses may have begun initially selling other categories such as books, livestock or chattel.

== Definition ==
The term “fine art auction house” is used here in a broad sense to include firms that regularly auction paintings, sculpture, furniture, works on paper and other established collecting categories.

The list is not intended to rank auction houses by size or present-day market share.

== Historical background ==
=== The Dutch Republic and the Baltic ===
Public art auctions experienced a renewed flurry of activity in the Dutch Republic during the 1640s. Guild regulations were consequently adapted to police the secondary art market. Traditionally, guilds dictated who could produce and sell artwork, with paintings typically sold through artists' workshops, licensed dealers or guild-approved retailers. Public auctions, however, created an additional channel for the circulation of works. As the market became increasingly saturated, guilds sought to regulate auctions more closely, in some cases organising sales themselves in order to supervise the trade and derive revenue from it. The increasing formalisation of auctions as permanent commercial institutions, rather than temporary sale venues, "created the necessary conditions for an organised export of newly produced artworks" to markets beyond the Dutch Republic. Existing Baltic trade networks, together with growing demand among the Swedish aristocracy for Dutch and Flemish paintings, contributed to the expansion of the northern European art market. Within this broader commercial context, Stockholms Auktionsverk was established in 1674 by royal charter, providing an institutional framework for the public sale of art and other movable property.

=== Early Developments in England ===
Compared with the Low Countries and Nordic nations, the development of England's fine art auction market trailed behind. As noted by Neil De Marchi and Hans J. Van Miegroet "No art market existed in London prior to the last fifteen years of the seventeenth century". At this time, the scarce number of fine art auctions that were executed predominantly took place in small coffee houses. As the auction market remained in its formative stages, commercial practices were only loosely regulated. Early legislation, introduced in 1777, sought to address this by prohibiting the practice of 'puffing', in which an auctioneer might take bids from fictitious bidders in order to inflate the final hammer price. De Marchi and Van Miegroet argue that public auctions became particularly popular in mid-eighteenth-century England because they provided an opportunity for relatively inexperienced buyers, who had not been exposed to the more established art trade in the Dutch Republic and Scandinavia, to observe how others bid and precisely what they chose to bid on in order to develop their own understanding. The growing popularity of fine art auctions was further stimulated by England's economic expansion during the late seventeenth century, driven in part by investment in joint-stock companies, the growth of share trading and sustained low interest rates. Consequently, the London "duopoly" of Christie's and Sotheby's, together with Bonhams and Phillips, have been characterised by their "interrelated" Georgian history, with all four firms founded within the space of fifty years. Other English auction houses, situated outside of London, such as Dreweatts, followed a pattern identified by Peter Ash, in which chattel and livestock were initially prioritised, before incorporating the sale of freehold property as the domestic property market developed. These firms would subsequently specialise in the sale of fine art.

== Founded before 1700 ==
Founded	Auction house	Headquarters	Description	Sources
1674	Stockholms Auktionsverk	Stockholm, Sweden	Swedish fine art and antiques auction house; the world's oldest surviving auction house.	
1681	Göteborgs Auktionsverk	Gothenburg, Sweden	Swedish auction house specialising in fine art, antiques, design and decorative arts; the world's second-oldest surviving auction house.	
1692	Ader-Nordmann	Paris, France	French auction house specialising in fine art, books and manuscripts.	

== 1700–1799 ==
Founded	Auction house	Headquarters	Description	Sources
1707	Dorotheum	Vienna, Austria	Austrian auction house specialising in fine art, antiques and jewellery.	
1731	Uppsala Auktionskammare	Uppsala, Sweden	Swedish fine art, antiques and design auction house.	
1744	Sotheby's	New York City, United States	International fine art auction house founded in London.	
1759	Dreweatts	Newbury and London, England	British fine art auction house specialising in single-owner collections and country house sales.	
1766	Christie's	London, England	International fine art auction house.	
1782	Sworders	Stansted Mountfitchet, England	British fine art and antiques auction house.	
1783	Whyte's	Dublin, Ireland	Irish fine art and antiques auction house.	
1788	Mallams	Abingdon and Cheltenham, England	British fine art and antiques auction house.	
1793	Bonhams	London, England	International fine art and antiques auction house.	
1796	Phillips	London and New York City	International auction house specialising in modern and contemporary art.	
1798	Lempertz	Cologne, Germany	German fine art and antiques auction house.	

== List of oldest defunct auction houses ==
The principal list excludes defunct firms and companies that have adopted the name of an earlier auction house without demonstrating direct continuity. The following auction houses were historically significant fine art auctioneers but are no longer in operation or do not survive as independent businesses. They are therefore excluded from the main list of oldest continuously operating fine art auction houses.

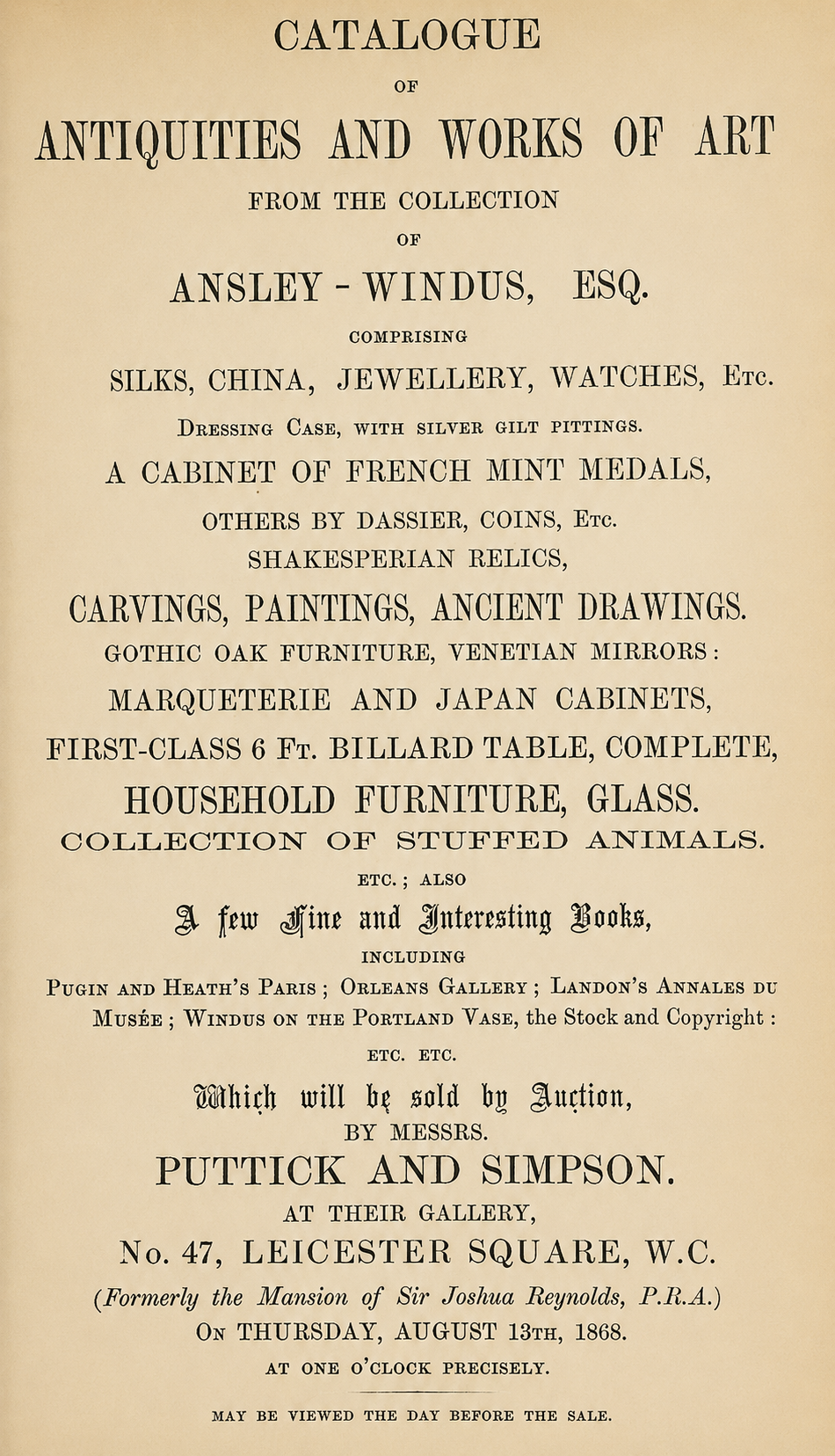
Catalogue for a Puttick & Simpson auction in 1868. Founded in 1794, Puttick & Simpson was a British fine art auction house that is now defunct.

See also: Category: Defunct auction houses

Founded	Auction house	Headquarters	Status	Description	Sources
1794	Puttick & Simpson	London, England	Defunct	British auction house specialising in fine art, books, manuscripts, natural history and antiquities.	
1831	Stevens' Auction Rooms	London, England	Closed	British auction house specialising in natural history, ethnographic material and works of art.	
1833	Foster's, formerly Edward Foster & Son	London, England	Defunct	British fine art auction house based in Pall Mall.	
1869	Rudolph Lepke's Kunst-Auctions-Haus	Berlin, Germany	Defunct	German fine art auction house specialising in Old Masters, decorative arts and antiquities.	
