= Mark Josephson (entrepreneur) =

Entrepreneur and executive coach

- Education: Skidmore College
- Occupations: Entrepreneur & Executive coach.
- Known for: former CEO of Bitly
- Website: markjosephson.net

Mark Josephson is an American entrepreneur and executive coach. He is a former CEO of Bitly.

== Early life and education ==
Born and raised in Rhode Island, Josephson graduated from Skidmore College in 1994.

== Career ==
Josephson began his career at Cone Communications in 1994 as an intern, becoming an account manager at the firm. In 1999, he worked in many roles with About.com, ending as the General Manager and EVP before it was sold to Primedia in 2000.

In 2003, Josephson become the president & CMO of Seevast. In 2008, he served as the CEO of Outside.in, until the platform was sold to AOL in 2011. In 2011, he served as a SVP of Patch Labs and SVP of Revenue and Marketing for Patch and AOL Local.

In 2013, Josephson became the CEO of Bitly. The business grew until it was sold to Spectrum Equity in 2017. In 2020, he co-founded Castiron, a software-as-a-service (SaaS) platform and consumer marketplace, and was the CEO until it was sold to The Good Soil Movement in 2024.

Since 2020, Josephson has been an executive coach, dedicated to helping startup CEOs and leadership teams.

== Personal life ==
Josephson resides in Sag Harbor, New York. He is married to Megan. They have three sons.
