= Så ska det låta =

Swedish game show

- Starring: Peter Harryson (1997–2005); Peter Settman (2006–2013); Kalle Moraeus (2014–2017); Sarah Dawn Finer (2018–2020)
- Country of origin: Sweden
- Original language: Swedish

Production
- Production location: Stockholm
- Running time: 60 minutes

Original release
- Network: SVT2
- Release: January 17, 1997 – 2000
- Network: SVT1
- Release: 2002 – January 30, 2020

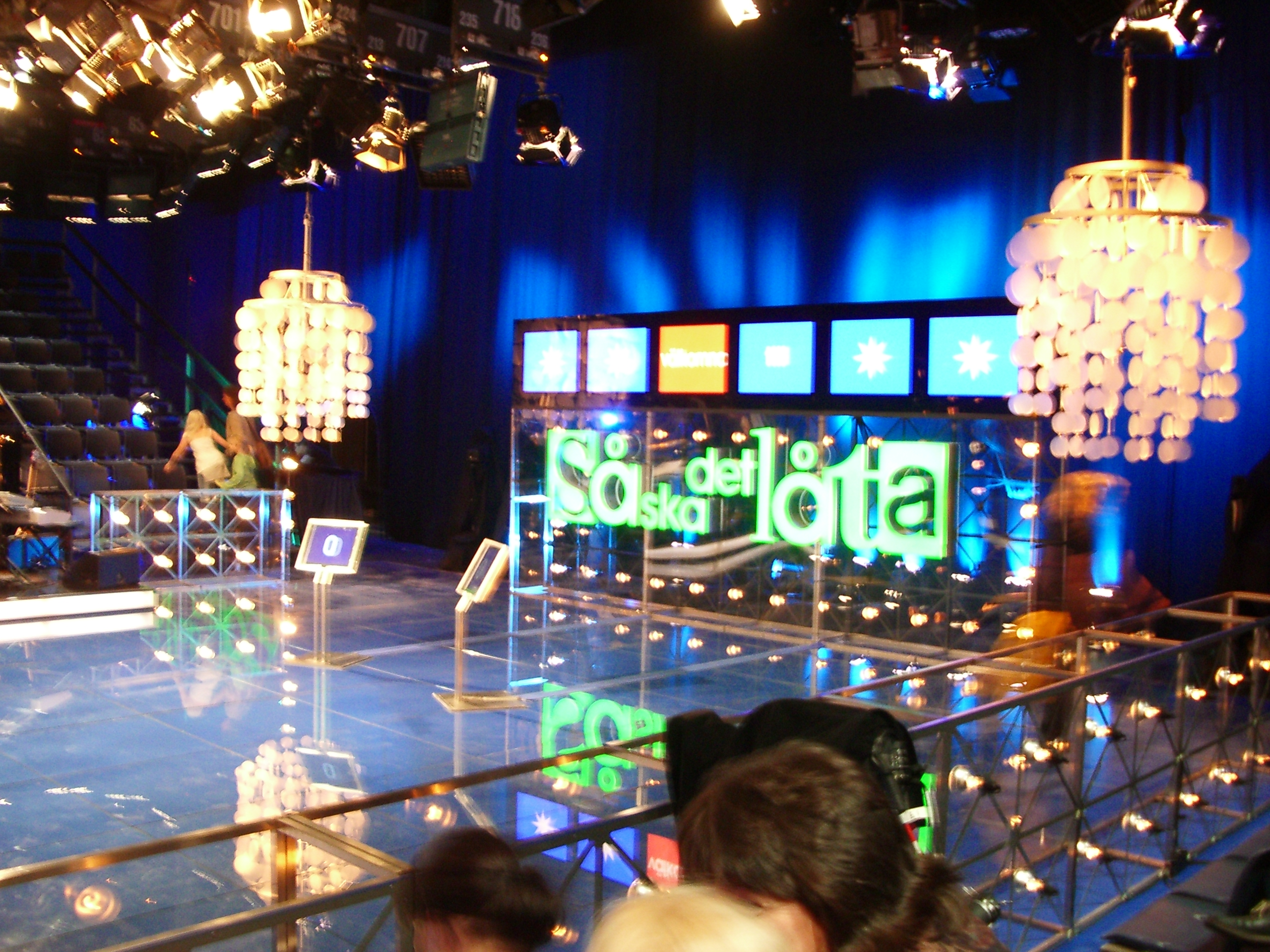

Så ska det låta is a Swedish game show, based on the Irish The Lyrics Board. The show was introduced in 1997 and led by Peter Harryson, until Peter Settman took over in 2006. In 2014, Kalle Moraeus became the third host of the show. In 2018, Sarah Dawn Finer became the fourth presenter of the program and the first female host of the show.

The program was originally broadcast on Friday evenings, but from 2012 until the cancellation in 2020, the program was instead broadcast on Sunday evenings.

In February 2020, SVT announced that it had decided to cancel the program indefinitely after season 25, in the spring of 2020. Since then, no new episodes of the program have been produced or broadcast. On May 22, 2022, the series Så ska det låta celebrates 25 years to celebrate 25 years since the program premiered. The four presenters Peter Harryson, Peter Settman, Kalle Moraeus and Sarah Dawn Finer each chose two programs that they remember particularly well.

== See also ==
- Diggiloo
- Doobidoo
