= Antikrundan =

Swedish version of the original BBC format Antiques Roadshow

- Title screen
- Presented by: Jesper Aspegren (1989–2000); Anne Lundberg (2001–)
- Theme music composer: Telemann
- Opening theme: Gigue
- Country of origin: Sweden
- Original language: Swedish
- No. of seasons: 30

Production
- Producers: Maud Uppling (–2008); Pernilla Månsson Colt (2009–)
- Running time: 50–60 minutes

Original release
- Network: SVT2 (1989–1999); SVT1 (2000–)
- Release: 26 August 1989 – present

Antikrundan is the Swedish version of the original BBC television format Antiques Roadshow. The show visits different locations in Sweden and lets people bring their antiques to be valued by experts. It has stayed popular throughout the years, often with more than two million viewers in a country with 8–9 million inhabitants. The 30th season was shown from November 2018 to April 2019. Many of the experts have been with the programme since the start. The show has been hosted by Anne Lundberg since 2001.

Antikrundan started out as a coproduction between SVT Malmö and the BBC where the Antiques Roadshow would visit Scandinavia for two programmes. Antikrundan premiered in August 1989 on TV2 and has since been shown on SVT every year. Jesper Aspegren was the original host. He left in 2000 to become CEO of an auction house, succeeded by current host Anne Lundberg.

The original British version of Antiques Roadshow has been broadcast to Sweden continuously in parallel with the Swedish show, on various channels over the years, including SVT, BBC Lifestyle and TV8.

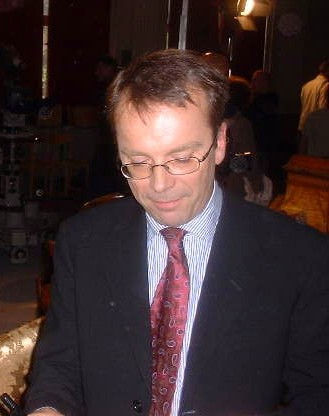
Knut Knutsson, one of the experts on the TV show, and also the proprietor of Uppsala Auktionskammare, the third oldest auction house in the world.
