= Hem till byn =

- Country of origin: Sweden
- Original language: Swedish

Original release
- Network: SVT
- Release: 1971 (Sweden) – 2006 (Sweden)

Hem till byn (English: Home to the village), written by Bengt Bratt (born 1937), is Sweden's longest-running TV series and one of its most popular. It is a realistic drama about people in a rural Swedish village and their daily life and romances and fights but also the consequences of agricultural policy and other changes in the society. The series was first aired in 1971 and has since then been shown in eight seasons (each season comprises between six and eight episodes) with three to five years between them, except a 14-year-long intermission between 1976 and 1990. The 2006 season was likely the last.

All the characters (even minor roles) were played by the same actors throughout the series' run, and thus aged naturally with the actors. As the actors grew older and eventually died during the years, the characters that they played had also died at the start of the following season. The seven seasons between 1971 and 2002 were directed by Jackie Söderman (1927–2011) and the eighth season of 2006 by Gun Jönsson (born 1929), who herself portrayed one of the main characters in the series.
