= Anna Pihl =

Danish police drama

Anna Pihl is a Danish police drama produced by TV2. The series stars Charlotte Munck (Kongekabale) as the title character Anna Pihl, Peter Mygind, and Iben Hjejle (High Fidelity and Blinkende Lygter) as Mikala. Three seasons have been produced between 2006 and 2008, each having 10 episodes.

The show follows the work and personal life of Anna Pihl, a policewoman at the Bellahøj police station in Copenhagen. She is divorced, and lives with her son, Mikkel, in a flat shared with Jan, her gay male friend. The show focuses on personal stories and realism: although it has action and suspense, it comes second to more realistic material.

Besides Denmark, the series has been broadcast in Iceland, Sweden, Norway and Finland. In Germany, the show was cancelled due to low ratings after the first nine episodes of season 1. A late night re-run started in September 2008. Season one aired in Estonia and in Australia on SBS One. In the United States, Latin America and Portugal, Anna Pihl airs on Eurochannel.

The theme song for season 1 was "Crosshair" by Blue Foundation, while the theme song for seasons 2 and 3 was "In the End I Started" by Swedish singer Maria Marcus and Dane Niels Brinck.
