= Dorotheum =

Auction house in Vienna, Austria

Coordinates: 48°12′22″N 16°22′06″E

Dorotheum GmbH & Co KG
- Type: Private
- Industry: Auctions
- Founded: 1707
- Headquarters: Vienna, Austria
- Key people: Chairman Martin Boehm, Lucas Tinzl
- Number of employees: ca. 530
- Website: www.dorotheum.com

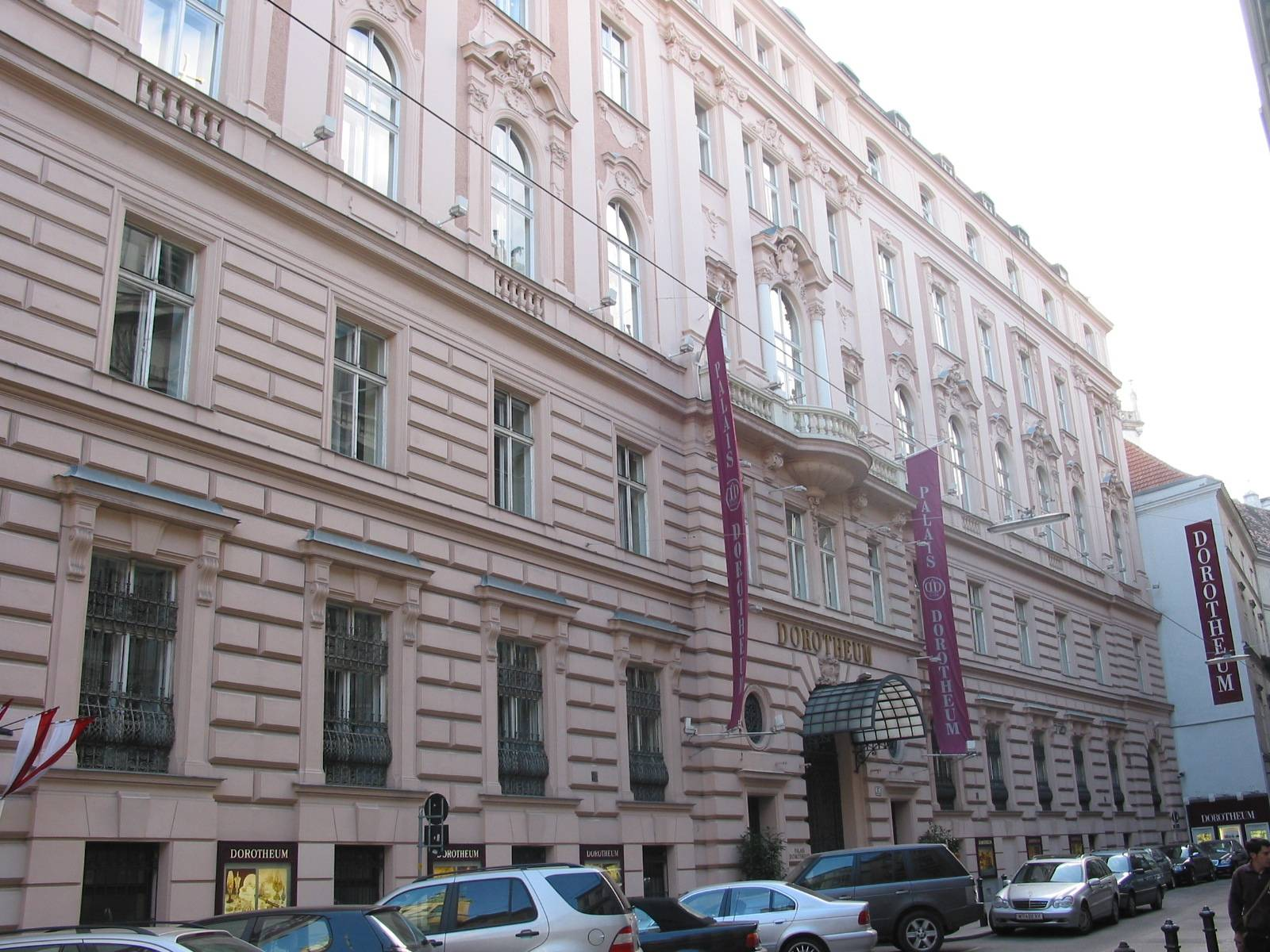
Dorotheum

The Dorotheum (German pronunciation: [ˌdoːʀoˈteːʊm]) is one of the world's oldest auction houses and is the largest auction house of art items in Continental Europe. Established by Emperor Joseph I in 1707, it has its headquarters in Vienna on the Dorotheergasse and branches in other European countries. Besides auctions, the retail sector also plays a major role in Dorotheum's business. In the Dorotheum, works of art, antiques, furniture, and jewellery from various centuries are put up for auction. The building is constructed in the neo-classical style. It is an attraction for Viennese natives and numerous tourists alike.

Branches exist in Vienna in the Austrian states, the Czech capital of Prague, and the Italian cities of Milan and Rome, as well as in Düsseldorf, Munich and Brussels.

== History ==
=== Founding ===
The firm's establishment as the Versatz- und Fragamt zu Wien was carried out by Emperor Joseph I in 1707. Seventy years later it moved into the former Dorotheerkloster, which gave it its current name of Dorotheum. The new building of the Dorotheum Palace in the location of the old cloister was completed in 1901.

=== Nazi-era activities ===
During the Nazi years, the Dorotheum played an important role in selling property seized from Jews by the Gestapo Office for the Disposal of the Property of Jewish Emigrants, known as the Vugesta.The Dorotheum chief expert, Dr. Hans Herbst, was appointed by Hermann Voss, director of Hitler's planned Führermuseum, as an official buyer for the Nazis.

=== Post-war redevelopment ===
After WWII the Dorotheum was rebuilt. In 1978 it held 2,722 auctions that grossed $25.2 million. At the end of the 1980s, the building's foyer and interior were redesigned by the Viennese architect and designer Luigi Blau. In 2001, the Dorotheum was sold to an Austrian consortium and since then has greatly expanded, including opening offices abroad in Germany, Belgium, Italy and the UK. In November 2018, a landscape painting, one of Pierre-Auguste Renoir's lesser-known works valued at €160,000, was stolen from the auction house just days before it was scheduled to be auctioned off.

== Controversies ==
In 2001 two landscapes by Norbert Grund that had been looted by Nazis in Holland in 1941 were consigned to the Dorotheum for sale. After public outcry and much discussion, the Dorotheum withdrew the paintings from sale and returned them, not to the consigners but to the "rightful owners".

Recognizing the risk that Nazi-looted art may have passed through the Dorotheum to museums, the State Museums of Vienna published a list of objects purchased from the Dorotheum between 1938 and 1945 to facilitate verification.

== Gallery ==
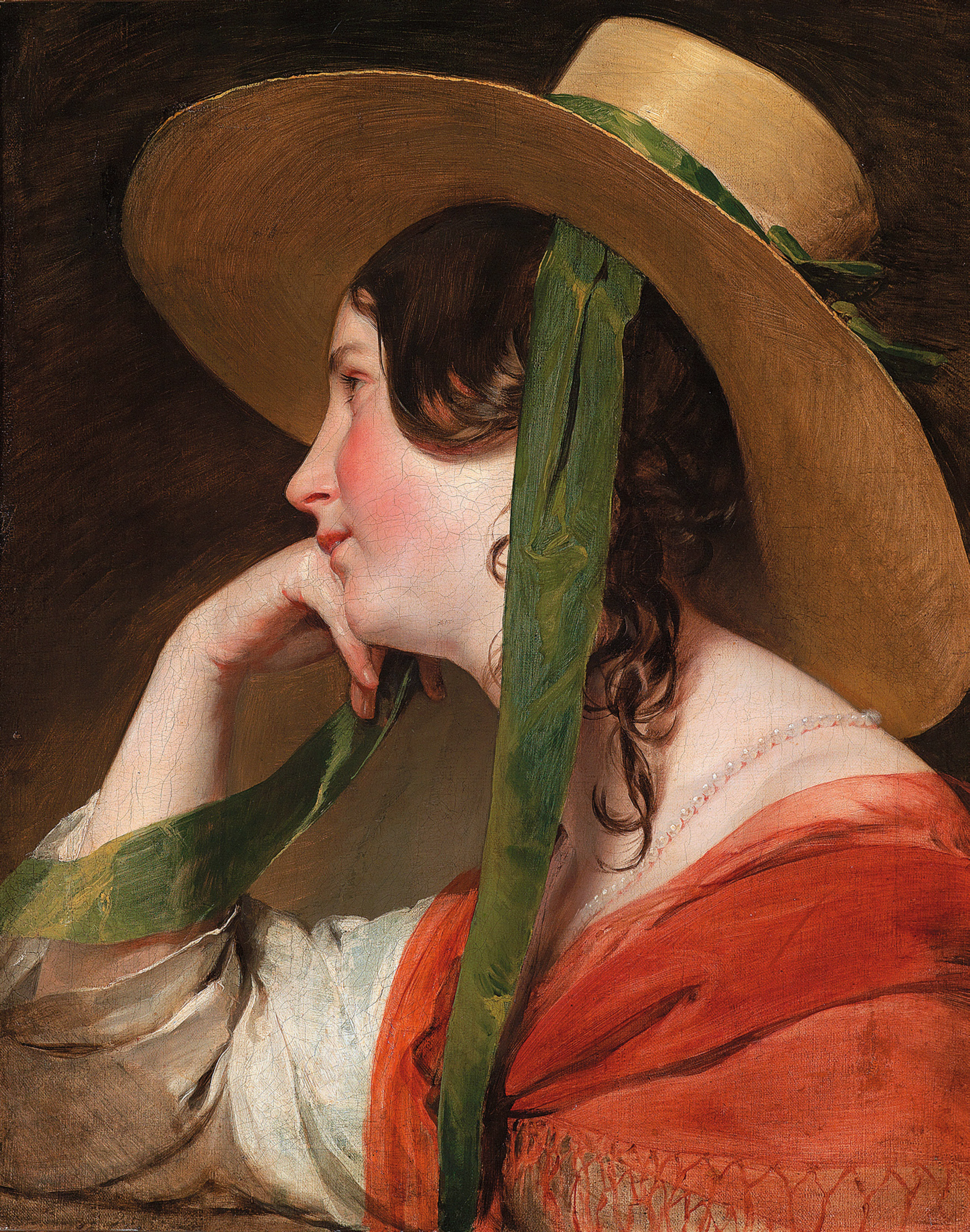
Girl with Straw Hat by Friedrich von Amerling

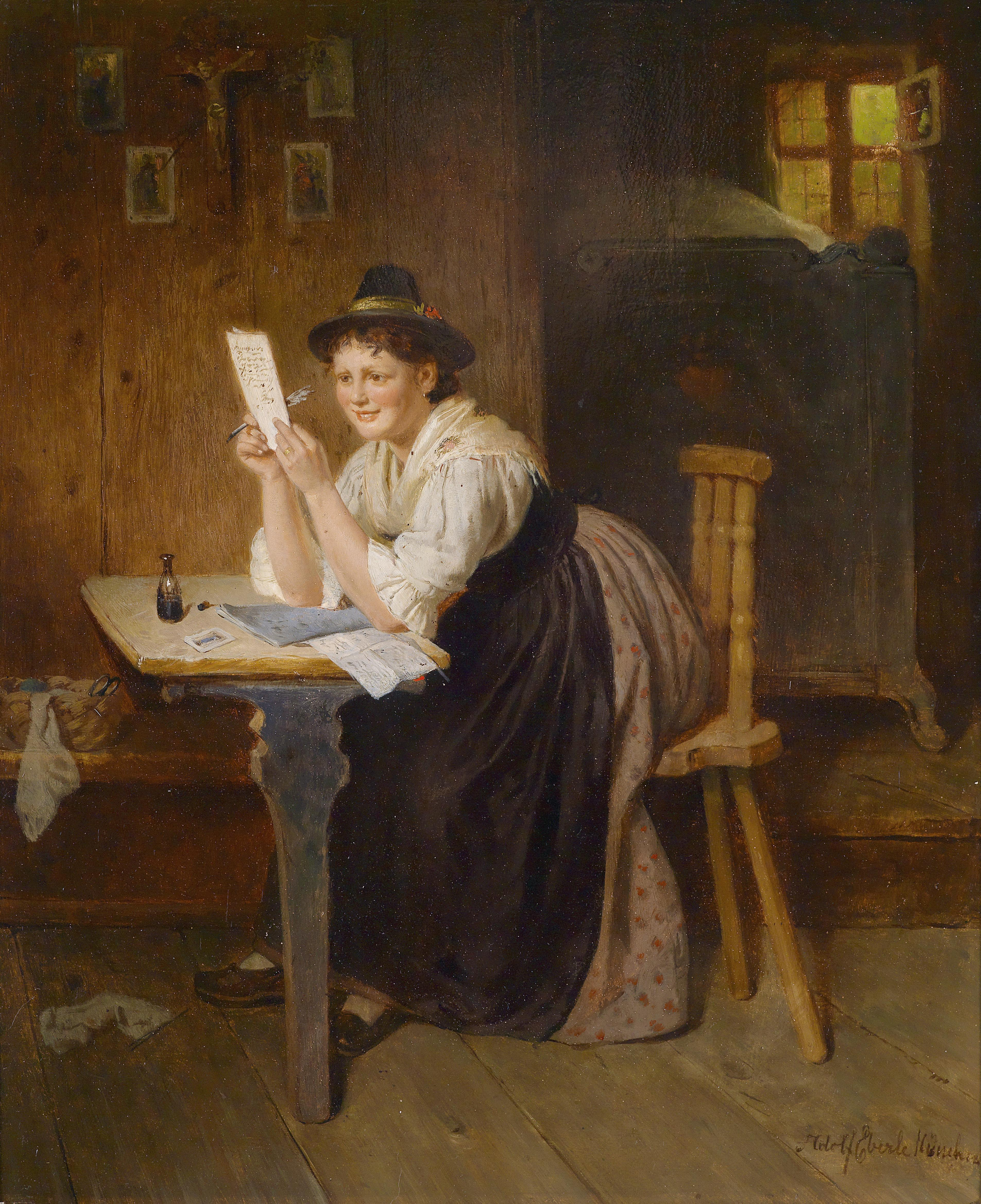
Der gelunge Brief, by Adolf Eberle

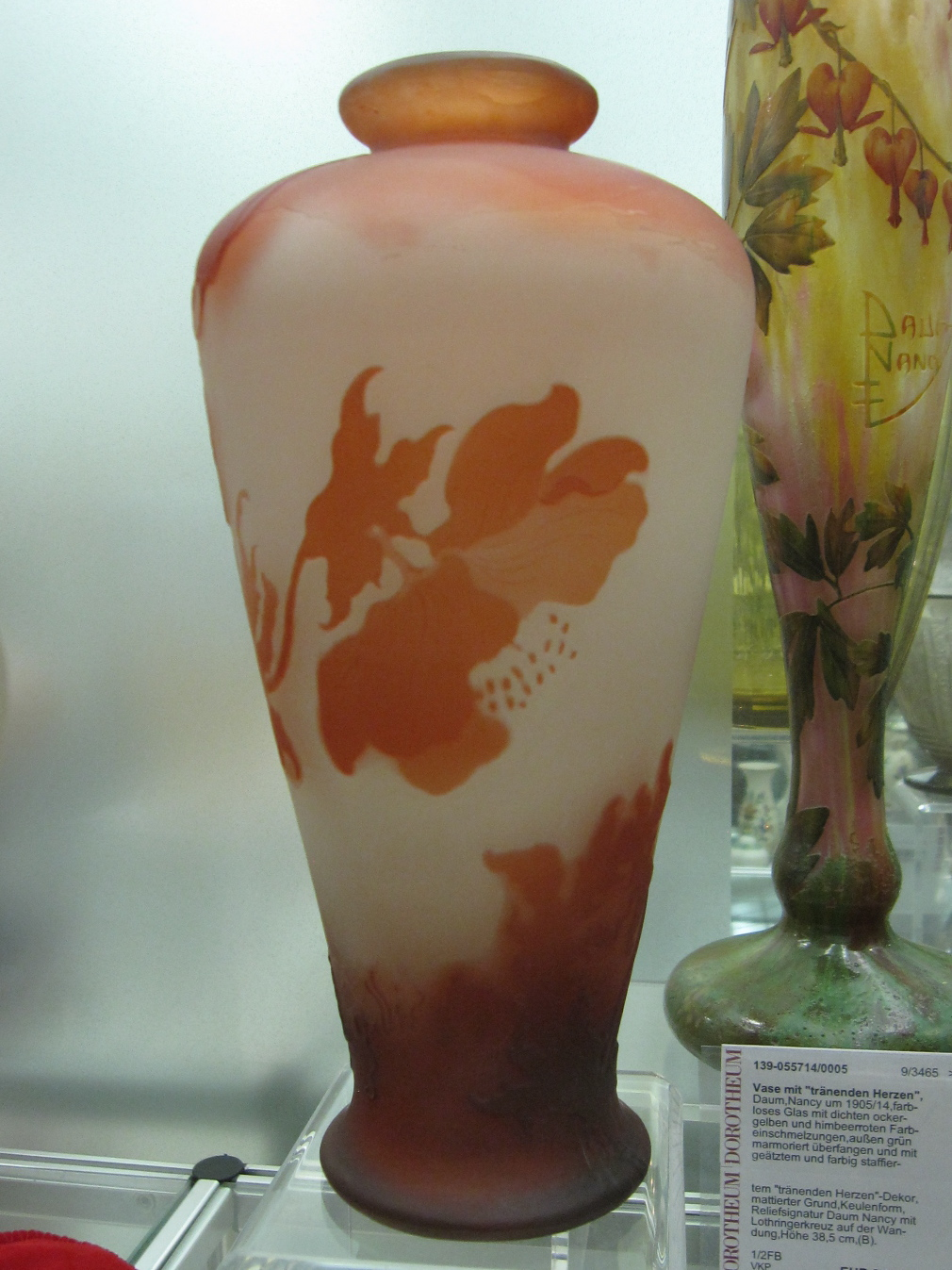
Vase by Émile Gallé

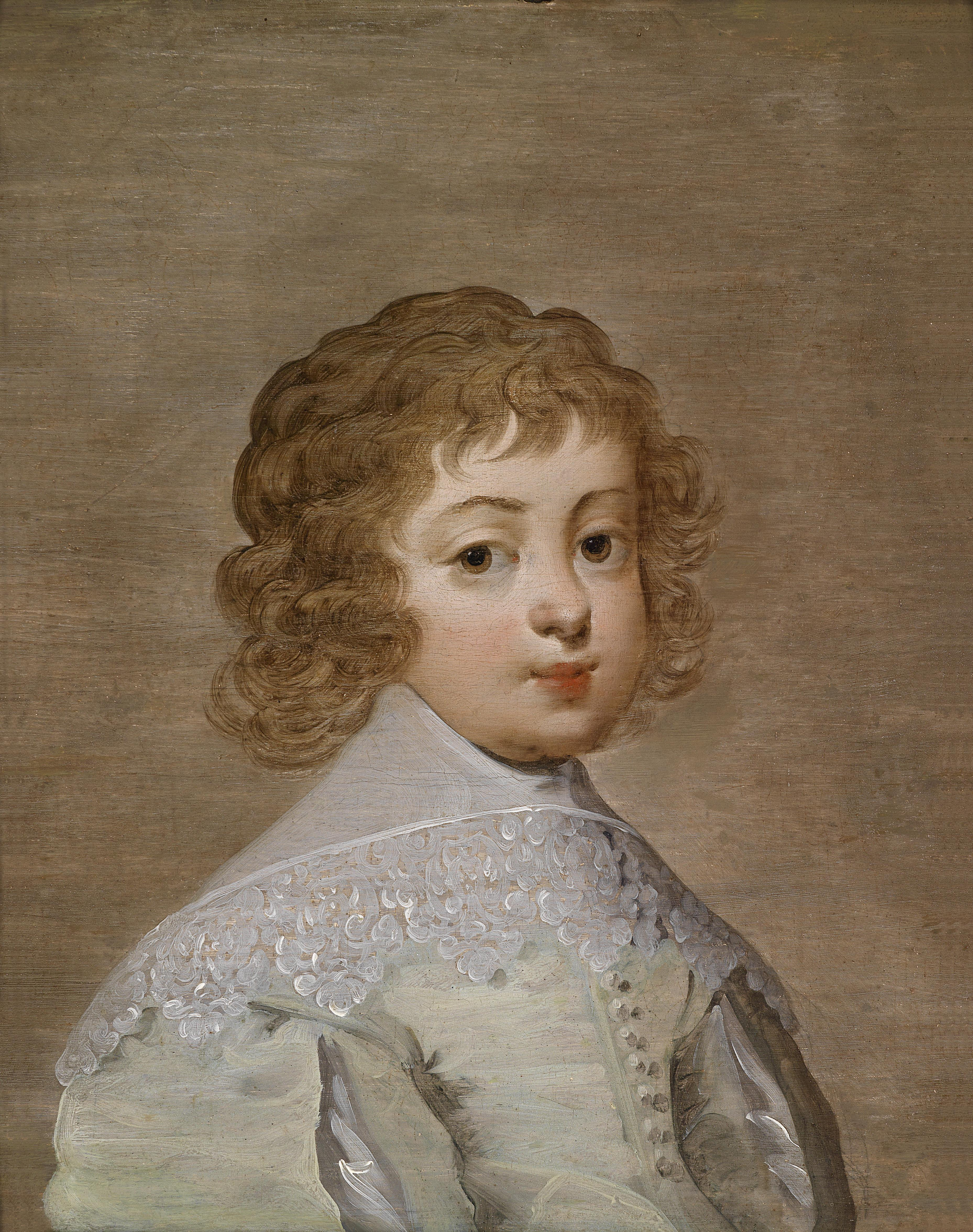
Portrait of a boy (possibly James II) by Anthony van Dyck

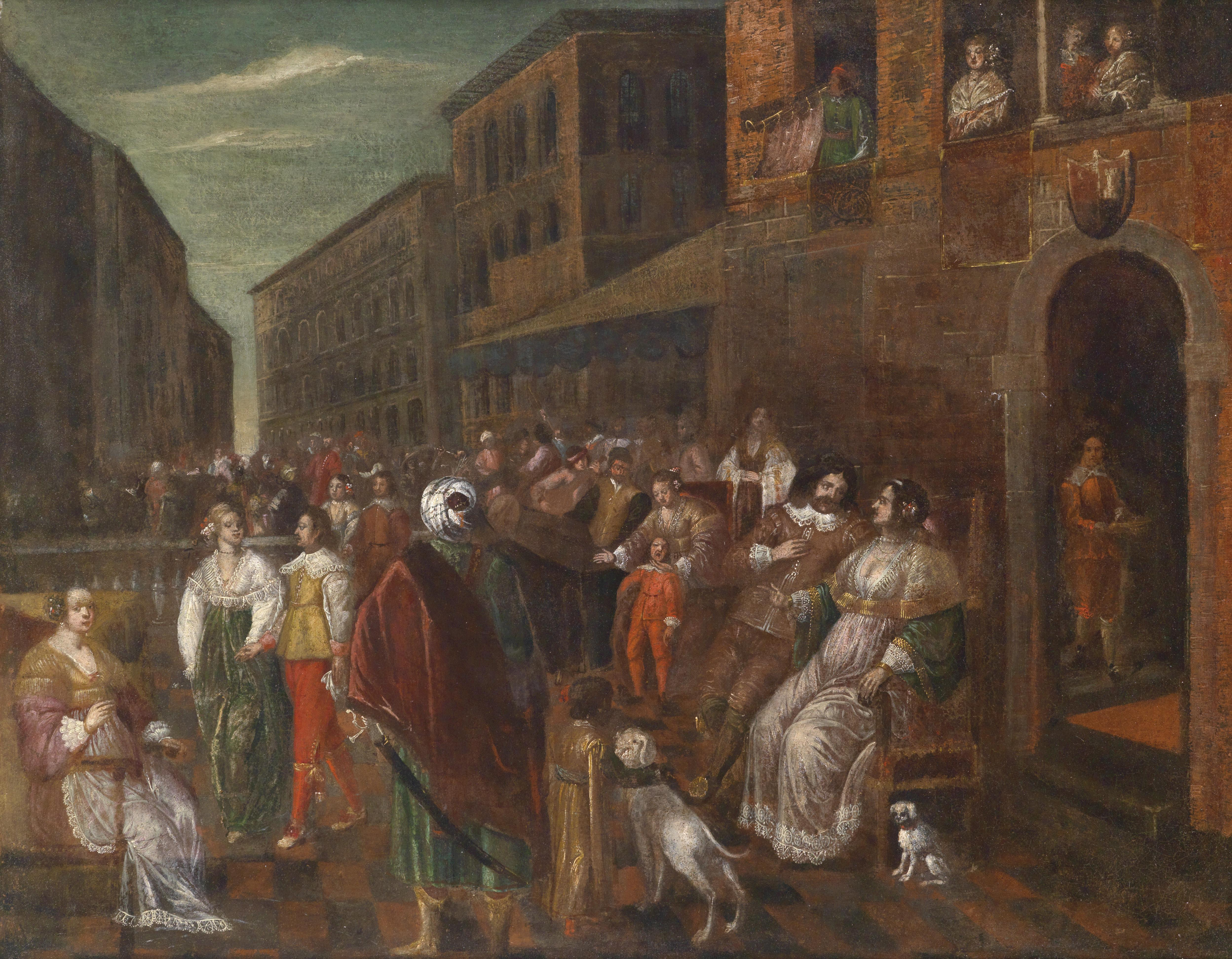
Painting from the Florentine School, 17th century (anonymous)

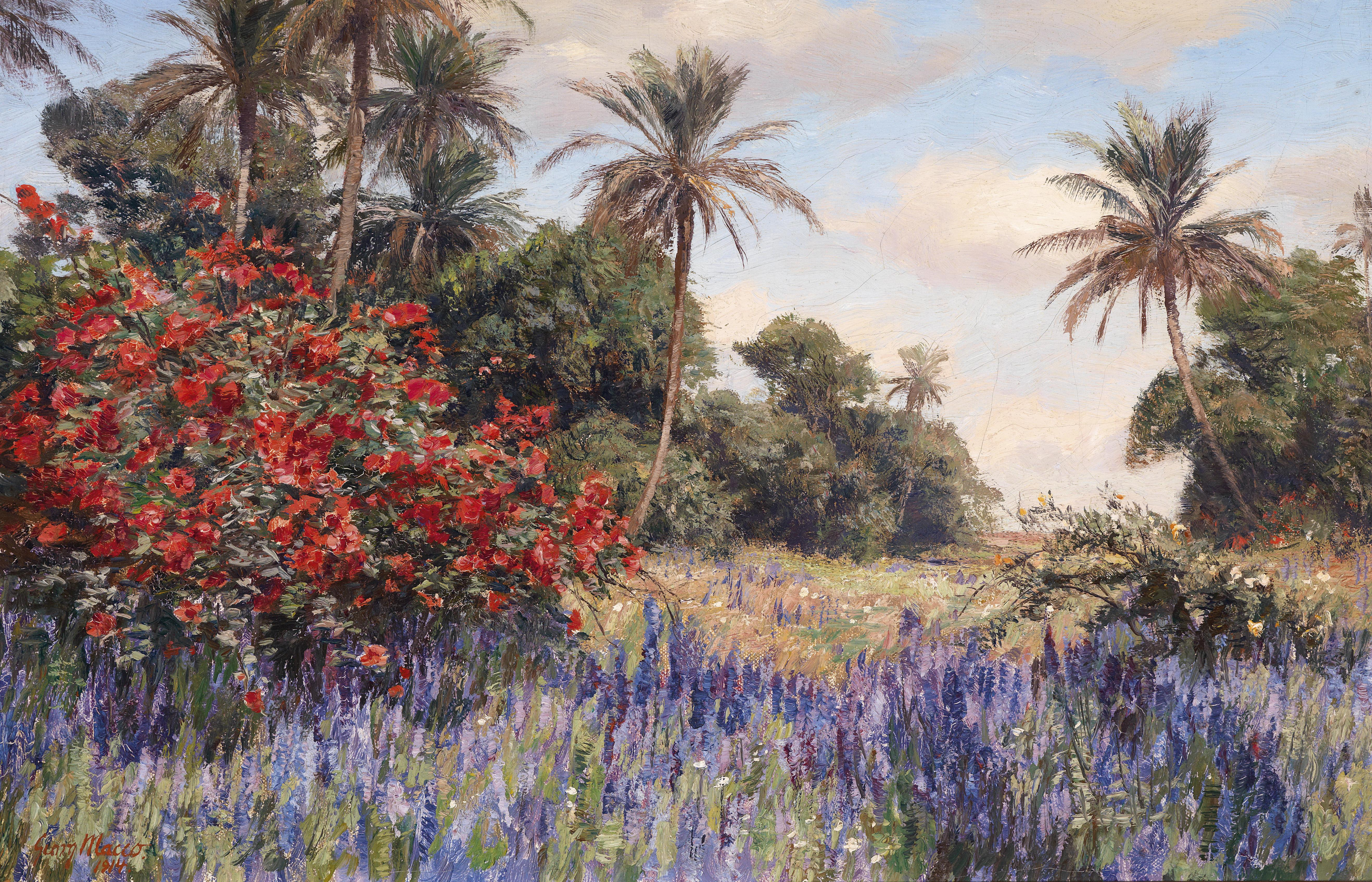
Südliche Landschaft mit Lavendel, Georg Macco, 1914.

== See also ==
- List of oldest fine art auction houses
