= Bonhams =

Auction house of fine art and antiques

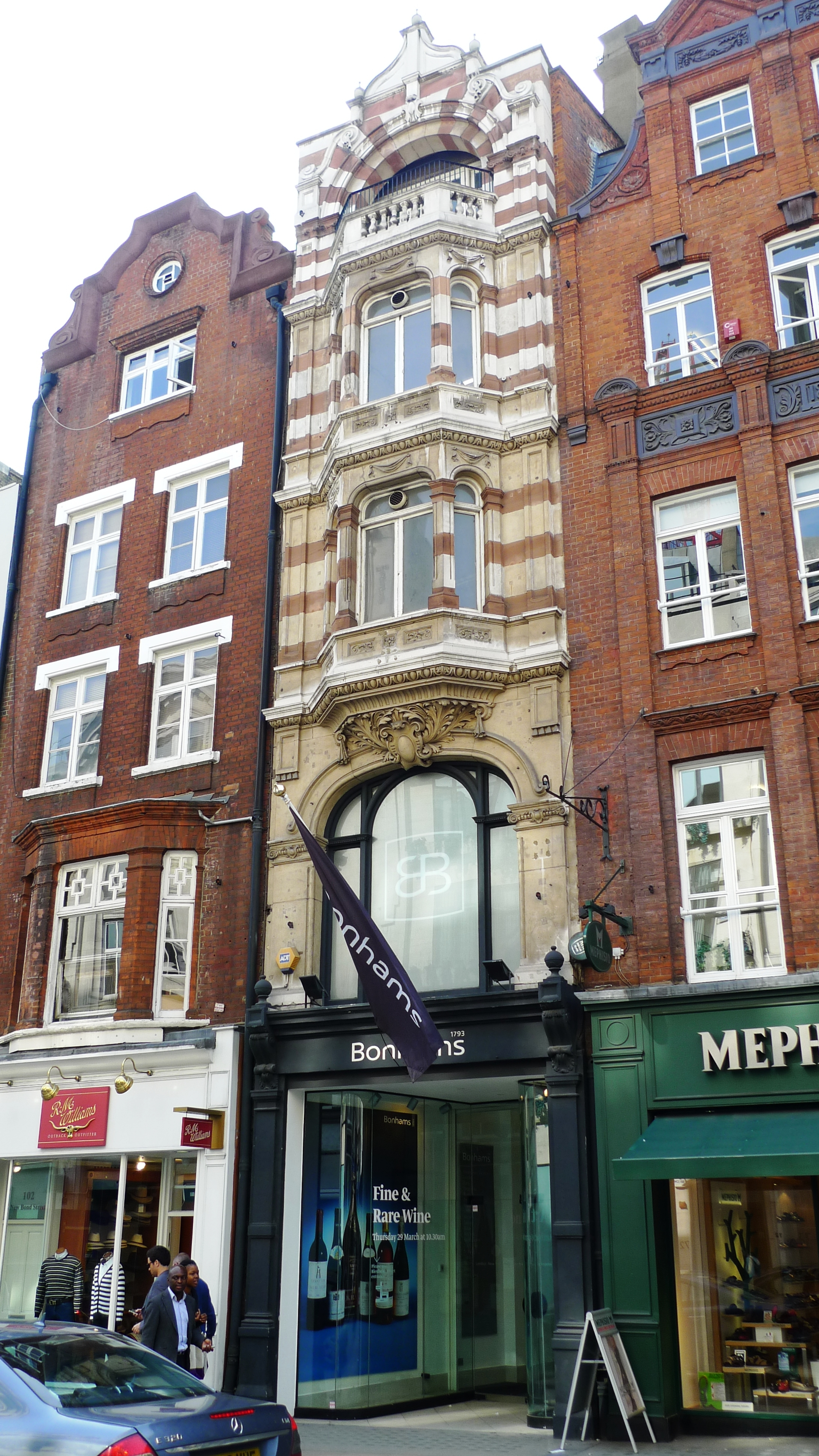
- Bonhams in Mayfair, London, U.K.
- Type: Private
- Industry: Auctions, Valuations
- Founded: 1793; 233 years ago London, United Kingdom
- Founders: Thomas Dodd and Walter Bonham
- Headquarters: 101 New Bond Street, London, United Kingdom
- Number of locations: 66 locations worldwide (as of 2012)
- Key people: Chabi Nouri (CEO); Hans-Kristian Hoejsgaard (Chairman); Alex Lejeune (CFO)
- Products: Fine arts, fine watches, fine jewellery, Asian art and motor cars
- Owner: Epiris
- Number of employees: 1,200 (2024)
- Divisions: Bonhams London; Bonhams Paris; Bonhams New York; Bonhams San Francisco; Bonhams Los Angeles; Bonhams Hong Kong; Bonhams Sydney; Bukowskis, Stockholm and Helsinki (acquired January 2022); Bruun Rasmussen, Copenhagen (acquired March 2022); Skinner Boston (acquired March 2022); Bonhams Cornette de Saint Cyr (acquired June 2022)
- Website: bonhams.com

Bonhams is a privately owned international auction house and one of the world's oldest and largest auctioneers of fine art and antiques. It was formed by the merger in November 2001 of Bonhams & Brooks and Phillips Son & Neale. This brought together two of the four surviving Georgian auction houses in London, Bonhams having been founded in 1793, and Phillips in 1796 by Harry Phillips, formerly a senior clerk to James Christie.

Today, the amalgamated business handles art and antiques auctions. Bonhams operates two salerooms in London—the former Phillips saleroom at 101 New Bond Street, and the old Bonham's saleroom at the Montpelier Galleries in Montpelier Street, Knightsbridge—with a saleroom in Edinburgh. Sales are also held around the world in New York, Hong Kong, Los Angeles, Paris, Boston, San Francisco, and Sydney. Bonhams holds more than 450 sales a year in more than 60 collecting areas, including Asian art, pictures, cars and jewellery. Bonhams has more than 1,000 staff with some of the world's leading specialists in their fields.

== History ==
Bonhams was set up in 1793 when Thomas Dodd, an antique print dealer, joined with the book specialist Walter Bonham. The company expanded and by the 1850s was handling all categories of antiques including jewellery, porcelain, furniture, arms and armour, and wine. After returning from the war, in the early 1950s, Leonard Bonham purchased some land in Knightsbridge and erected a saleroom on Montpelier Street. The first sale was held in June 1956.

In 2000, Bonhams became Bonhams & Brooks when it was acquired by Brooks auction house. Brooks had been founded in 1989 by the former Head of Cars at Christie's, Robert Brooks who specialized in the sale of classic and vintage motorcars. Brooks continued a major acquisition programme aimed at creating a new international fine art auction house.

In 2001 Bonhams & Brooks merged with Phillips Son & Neale to form a new UK company trading as Bonhams. Phillips Son & Neale had been based in 101 New Bond Street, which subsequently became the new headquarters of Bonhams. The building consisted of seven different freeholds and had been described as "a Dickensian rabbit warren". The first of the sites to be acquired was Blenstock House, an Art Deco building at the junction of Blenheim Street and Woodstock Street, eventually acquiring the complete building in 1974.

Acquisition activity continued, and in 2002 Bonhams purchased Butterfields, a leading auction house in California founded in 1865. Bonhams changed Butterfields' name to Bonhams & Butterfields, and Malcolm Barber, formerly of Brooks, became the chief executive officer of the American subsidiary. Bonhams remained the company's brand name outside of the United States.

By the end of 2003 Bonhams was conducting more than 700 annual sales with revenues of $304 million. The company's worldwide network of sales included two major London venues, nine additional UK locations, and salerooms in Australia, Switzerland, Monaco, Germany and the US. Bonhams & Butterfields conducted its first East Coast sale in 2003 with an auction of Edwin C. Jameson's collection of classic cars and antiques in Massachusetts, US.

During 2005, Bonhams expanded further with the opening of the Paris office and a new saleroom in New York.

In October 2005, Bonhams gained full independence after buying back a 49.9% stake held by French luxury goods conglomerate LVMH.

As part of a phased programme of international expansion, Bonhams opened an office in Hong Kong in 2007. Seven years later, in 2014, it established an East Asian HQ and saleroom in Hong Kong in One Pacific Place. Bonhams East Asian and Southeast Asian network includes offices in Beijing, Shanghai, Taipei and Singapore.

In March 2008, Bonhams New York moved to new salerooms on the corner of 57th Street and Madison Avenue, formerly the home of the respected Dahesh Museum of Art. The inaugural sale featured 20th century furniture and decorative arts.

In 2013, Bonhams opened its new headquarters at 101 New Bond Street, designed by Lifschutz Davidson Sandilands; and in 2015 it completed a seven-figure refurbishment of its Knightsbridge saleroom. In 2016, Bonhams held its first online-only auction; the sale of watches from the collection of a European nobleman.

In September 2018, Bonhams was acquired by the UK-based private equity company, Epiris.

In January 2022, Bonhams acquired the Nordic auction house Bukowskis for an undisclosed sum.

in March 2022, Bonhams acquired the US auction house Skinner Inc. for an undisclosed sum. The new company is called Bonhams Skinner. Also in March 2022, Bonhams acquired the Danish auction house, Bruun Rasmussen for an undisclosed sum.

In October 2025, Bonhams was acquired by Pemberton Asset Management, a UK asset manager.

== Locations ==
Bonhams has a worldwide network of offices and regional representatives in 25 countries. It has three salerooms in the UK; two major salerooms in London – New Bond Street and Knightsbridge, and a saleroom in Edinburgh. Regional offices around the UK offer valuation and consignment services. In Europe, sales are held in France, Monaco and Belgium. In the US, sales are held in New York, Los Angeles and Boston. In Asia-Pacific, sales take place in Bonhams saleroom in Pacific Place, Hong Kong, and in Sydney and Melbourne.

== Notable auctions ==
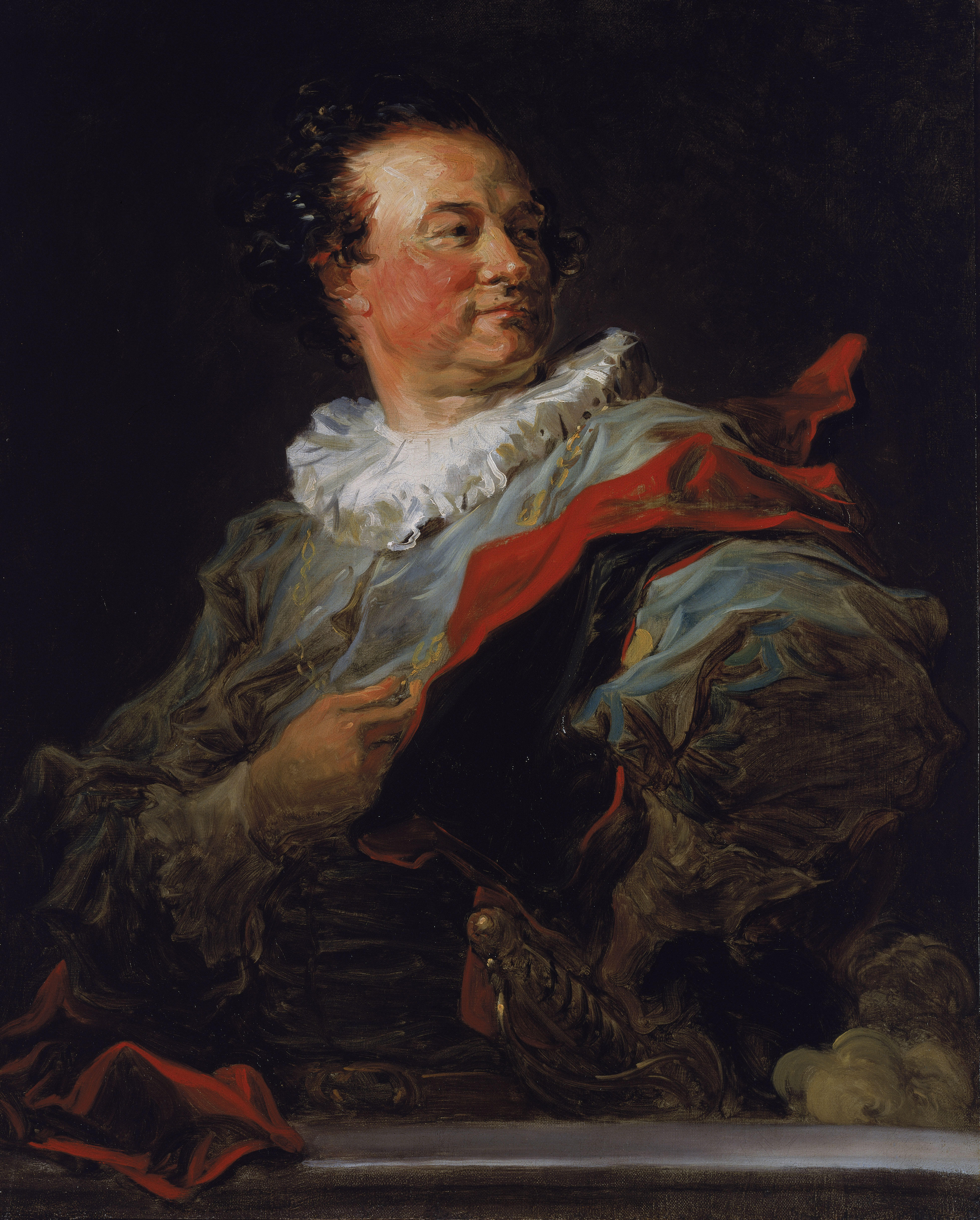
Portrait of François-Henri d'Harcourt by Fragonard. Sold by Bonham's for £17,106,500

- La fête d’anniversaire by Léonard Tsuguharu Foujita, sold for £7,096,250, a new world record price at auction for the artist at the Impressionist and Modern Sale at New Bond Street on 11 October 2018.
- A set of four huanghuali folding chairs sold for £5,289,250 at the Fine Chinese Art Sale, Bonhams London on 9 November 2017.
- A blue and white garlic mouth vase, Yongzheng seal, sold in Hong Kong for HK$76,280,000 (£6,244,187) in 2014.
- 1962–63 Ferrari 250 GTO Berlinetta, sold at Quail Lodge, California in 2014 for $38,115,000. This was the world record for the most valuable motor car sold at auction until August 2018.
- Jean-Honoré Fragonard's portrait of Francois-Henri, 5th Duc d’Harcourt, achieved £17,106,500 in London in 2013. It remains the most valuable French Rococo painting sold at auction.
- A fancy deep-blue 'Trombino' diamond ring was sold for £6,201,250 in London in April 2013.
- The ex-Juan Manuel Fangio 1954 Mercedes-Benz W196R sold at The Goodwood Festival of Speed in 2013 for £19,600,000
- Madonna Laboris, a painting by Russian artist Nikolai Roerich, achieved £7,881,250 in London in 2013.
- An ultra-rare, record breaking Vincent Black Lightning sold at Bonhams annual Las Vegas Motorcycle Auction in 2018 became the most valuable motorcycle ever sold at auction. It achieved $929,000 (£651,715 at the time) including buyer's premium.

== See also ==
- List of oldest fine art auction houses
