= Doobidoo =

- Genre: gameshow
- Country of origin: Sweden
- Original language: Swedish

Original release
- Network: SVT
- Release: 26 August 2005

Doobidoo is a Swedish musical game show first aired on 26 August 2005 on the public service network SVT. There is also a Polish, TVP2, version called Dubidu - show host Piotr Gasowski - and an Australian version that goes by You may be right, hosted by Todd McKenney.

In 2018, the program was put on hold because Lasse Kronér was reported to the police for allegations of sexual abuse in the autumn of 2017. He was subsequently cleared of the charges, and the program resumed in 2019 and has been broadcast since then.

The Swedish version of the show is hosted by entertainment personality Lasse Kronér. The show has (2023) run for 16 seasons.

== See also ==
- Diggiloo
- Så ska det låta
