= Sommartorpet =

- Presented by: Ernst Kirchsteiger
- Country of origin: Sweden
- Original language: Swedish
- No. of seasons: 7
- No. of episodes: 72

Production
- Producer: SVT Örebro
- Running time: >30 minutes

Original release
- Release: June 14, 2000

Sommartorpet is a Swedish home improvement television programme broadcast by Sveriges Television. It is broadcast in the summer and based around the renovation of an old house (although there have been variations in later seasons).

In the first seasons, the programme was fronted by a host, a carpenter and the decorator Ernst Kirchsteiger. Eventually Kirchsteiger grew in popularity (to the point of almost being a cult figure), so he became the sole host of the programme.

The first season was hosted by Gila Bergqvist with Kirchsteiger as decorator and Ernst Kirchsteiger as carpenter renovating a cottage. Bergqvist was replaced by Bella Linde in the third season (shown in 2002). In the fourth (2003) season, Mats Öierstedt became the new carpenter and Linde got a new role as reporter. From the fifth season (2004), Kirchsteiger has hosted the show alone. A variation of the format was made in 2005, when Kirchsteiger built a new house, rather than renovating an old one. The show took a break in 2006, but returned for a seventh season in 2007. This season is likely to be the last, as Kirchsteiger joins TV4 the following autumn.

Since 2002, the programme has a spinoff called Nya rum which is shown in the autumn and winter. As the original version it started out with the same presenter team as Sommartorpet, but with Kirchsteiger eventually becoming the sole presenter.
