= Josefsson =

Josefsson is a Swedish surname meaning "son of Josef". Notable people with the surname include:

- Ari Jósefsson (1939–1964), Icelandic poet
- Carl Josefsson (1895–1974), Swedish ice hockey player
- Carl Josefsson (born 1965), Swedish Judge at the Svea Court of Appeal in Stockholm
- Daniel Josefsson (born 1981), Swedish professional ice hockey player
- Enar Josefsson (1916–1989), former Swedish cross-country skier
- Erik Josefsson (ice hockey) (born 1987), Swedish professional ice hockey player
- Helena Josefsson (born 1978), Swedish singer and songwriter
- Hugo Josefsson, Swedish philatelist
- Janne Josefsson (born 1957), Swedish investigative journalist

== See also ==
- Josephson
