= Bonde söker fru =

Swedish television program

- Genre: Reality
- Presented by: Linda Isacsson
- Country of origin: Sweden
- Original language: Swedish
- No. of seasons: 14
- No. of episodes: 13

Production
- Producer: Meter Film & Television
- Camera setup: 60 minutes (with commercials)

Original release
- Network: TV4
- Release: 28 May 2006

Bonde söker fru ("Farmer Seeks Wife") is a Swedish reality television program broadcast by TV4 based on the Fremantle format Farmer Wants a Wife. The series introduces a handful of single farmers to multiple potential partners, who proceed to date on their respective farms, in pursuit of marriage.

The program premiered in spring 2006 with two episodes presenting the farmers themselves, and instructing applicants to contact the producers. The main broadcast in autumn 2006 proved very successful, averaging 1.5 million viewers per episode. The second season included female farmers, while the third season (2008) included a gay farmer.
