= Postkodmiljonären =

- Logo (2025-present)
- Genre: Game show
- Based on: Who Wants to Be a Millionaire? franchise
- Presented by: Rickard Sjöberg
- Country of origin: Sweden
- Original language: Swedish
- No. of seasons: 41 (as of 2026 spring season)

Production
- Production company: Warner Bros. International Television Production

Original release
- Network: TV4
- Release: 26 August 2005 – present

Logo (2005–2008)

Logo (2008-2016)

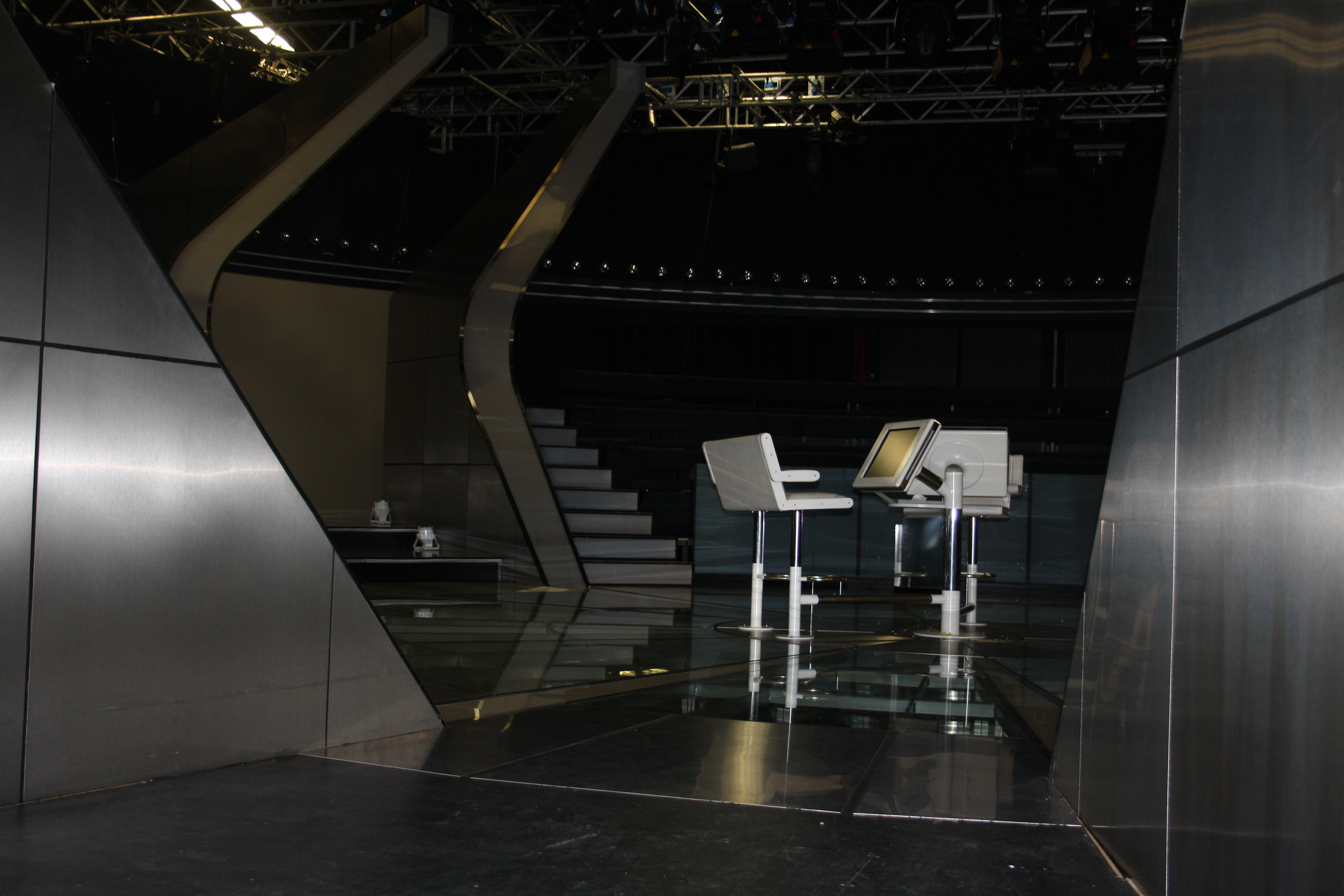
Postkodmiljonären studio set (2005-15), as seen before the taping of an episode.

Screenshot of the show showing the introduction of two celebrity contestants Amanda and Linnea Nyström, from the episode aired 29 November 2008.

Postkodmiljonären (transl. The postcode millionaire) is a Swedish game show based on the original British format of Who Wants to Be a Millionaire?. The show debuted on 26 August 2005 and is hosted by Rickard Sjöberg. It is shown every Friday and Saturday from 7:30 PM to 8 PM (CET) on the Swedish commercial television station TV4. The programme is also combined with a lottery, Postkodlotteriet (the local version of Postcode Lottery), in a twice-weekly format.

The main goal is to win 1 million SEK by answering 15 multiple-choice questions correctly. The more questions the contestant answers correctly, the more money the contestant passively earns. There are three to four lifelines which the participant can use to help them on their journey. There are "guaranteed levels" that guarantee the participant will walk away with a certain amount of money. The participant may also refuse to answer a question and walk away with the money the participant has most recently passively or certainly earned. The game ends when the participant answers a question incorrectly, decides to walk away, or answers the million-kronor question.

== History broadcast and production ==
The original format broadcast between 2000 and 2003 was known as Vem vill bli miljonär? and lacked the lottery tie-in.

== Format ==
The game contains 15 levels, each of which consists of one question. There are three guaranteed levels: 10,000 SEK, 100,000 SEK, and 1,000,000 SEK. The game begins with the contestant deciding whether or not to include the Switch the Question lifeline; if the lifeline is included, the 100,000 SEK level is not guaranteed. The game then begins. Each question has four possible answers. Lifelines may be used by the contestant on any question, which are Fifty Fifty (50:50 – femtio-femtio), Phone-A-Friend (ring en vän), Ask The Star (fråga stjärnorna), and Switch the Question (byta fråga). Fifty Fifty randomly takes away two possible wrong answers, leaving the contestant only two alternatives. Phone-A-Friend lets the contestant call a friend to help the contestant with the question. During Phone-A-Friend, the contestant and the called person are given 30 seconds to discuss the question. Ask The Star helps a panel of celebrities answer the question. Switch the Question swaps the question for a new one while forcing the contestant to pick an answer to find out the correct answer to the initial question. Each lifeline may only be used once during the entire game. Multiple lifelines may be used on the same question.

Every time the contestant answers a question correctly, the contestant moves one step up in the money tree. If the participant answers the million-SEK question correctly, the game ends, and the participant wins the top prize of 1,000,000 SEK and is declared a millionaire. If the contestant wrongly answers a question, the correct answer is revealed, the game ends, and the contestant walks away with the money value of the most recently cleared guaranteed level, which means that if the contestant loses before clearing the 10,000 SEK level, the contestant walks away empty-handed. If the contestant decides not to answer the question, the game ends, and the contestant walks away with the money value of the most recently cleared level and is instead asked to guess the correct answer to the question. If the contestant walks away before completing the first question, the contestant walks away empty-handed.

Occasionally, special episodes are aired where the show invites pairs of Swedish celebrities who play together. However, these pairs don't get to keep their earnings; instead, they are donated to a charitable organization chosen by the pair.

=== Payout structure ===
Payout structure
Question number	Question value (in SEK)
15	1,000,000
14	500,000
13	350,000
12	225,000
11	150,000
10	100,000*
9	75,000
8	50,000
7	30,000
6	20,000
5	10,000
4	5,000
3	3,000
2	2,000
1	1,000
Guaranteed level Top prize * Guaranteed if without Switch the Question lifeline

== Top prize winners ==
As of 14 February 2025, there have been 15 top prize winners in Postkodmiljonären: Per Hörberg, Torgny Segerstedt, Olle Laurell, Jan Sundström, Mattias Österman, Lena Anviken, Birgitta Hedström, the pair Lena Ag and Alexandra Pascalidou, Ylva Orrmell, Marianne Hiller, Ulf Jensen, Eric Forsyth, Jonas von Essen Wilmer Bach-Lundin, and Simon Alling. Anviken was the first female top prize winner and the sixth overall. Bach-Lundin is the youngest winner with an age of 19. Overall, there have been ten male winners, four female winners, and one pair winner.

This was Simon Alling's one million SEK question:

1,000,000 SEK (15 of 15)

What is the capital of Equatorial Guinea?

1. Malabo(correct answer)
2. Moroni
3. Maseru
4. Mbabane

This was Wilmer Bach-Lundin's one million SEK question:

1,000,000 SEK (15 of 15)

Which of these film stars is not mentioned in the Madonna song "Vogue"?

1. Rita Hayworth(answer was eliminated either using the 50:50 lifeline or by choosing it while using the Double Dip lifeline)
2. Elizabeth Taylor(correct answer)
3. Greta Garbo(answer was eliminated either using the 50:50 lifeline or by choosing it while using the Double Dip lifeline)
4. Ginger Rogers

This was Jonas von Essen's one million SEK question:

1,000,000 SEK (15 of 15)

Which architect drew the Indian states Punjab's and Haryana's capital city, Chandigarh, which was constructed in the 1950s?

1. Le Corbusier(correct answer)
2. Jörn Utzon(answer was eliminated either using the 50:50 lifeline or by choosing it while using the Double Dip lifeline)
3. Ralph Erskine(answer was eliminated either using the 50:50 lifeline or by choosing it while using the Double Dip lifeline)
4. Oscar Niemeyer

This was Eric Forsyth's one million SEK question:

1,000,000 SEK (15 of 15)

What is the name of Burma's capital since 2005 when it replaced Rangoon?

1. Irrawaddy
2. Naypyidaw(correct answer)
3. Hkakabo Razi
4. Htin Kyaw

This was Ulf Jensen's one million SEK question:

1,000,000 SEK (15 of 15)

Who wrote the line "The night is the day's mother, Chaos is neighbour with God" which has given rise to the naming of two of Lars Norén's dramas?

1. Esaias Tegnér(answer was eliminated either using the 50:50 lifeline or by choosing it while using the Double Dip lifeline)
2. Hjalmar Gullberg
3. Erik Johan Stagnelius(correct answer)
4. Carl Jonas Love Almqvist(answer was eliminated either using the 50:50 lifeline or by choosing it while using the Double Dip lifeline)

This was Marianne Hiller's one million SEK question:

1,000,000 SEK (15 of 15)

Who was the crown princess Victoria's paternal grandfather's paternal grandmother?

1. Victoria(correct answer)
2. Sofia
3. Louise
4. Margareta

This was Ylva Orrmell's one million SEK question:

1,000,000 SEK (15 of 15)

What of the following best describes a cuckold?

1. An old fishing tool
2. A deceived genuine husband(correct answer)
3. A horizontal beam in a truss
4. A happy event

This was the pair Lena Ag and Alexandra Pascalidou's one million SEK question:

1,000,000 SEK (15 of 15)

What was the name of the prized horse whose severed head was in the producer Woltz's bed in the movie "The Godfather"?

1. Rabat
2. Khartoum(correct answer)
3. Harare
4. Pretoria

This was Birgitta Hedström's one million SEK question:

1,000,000 SEK (15 of 15)

What does the Hawaiian word 'wiki' mean, having given the name for the Internet encyclopedia Wikipedia?

1. Simple
2. Quick(correct answer)
3. Knowledge(answer was eliminated either using the 50:50 lifeline or by choosing it while using the Double Dip lifeline)
4. Little(answer was eliminated either using the 50:50 lifeline or by choosing it while using the Double Dip lifeline)

This was Lena Anviken's one million SEK question:

1,000,000 SEK (15 of 15)

What is visible in the background of da Vinci's famous drawing Mona Lisa?

1. A curtain
2. A county(correct answer)
3. A city
4. A flock of sheep

This was Mattias Österman's one million SEK question:

1,000,000 SEK (15 of 15)

What was the serial killer John Doe's own deadly sin in the film 'Seven'?

1. Sloth
2. Wrath
3. Envy(correct answer)
4. Lust

This was Jan Sundström's second one million SEK question (after using Switch the Question):

1,000,000 SEK (15 of 15)

Who was the first woman in space?

1. Valentina Tereshkova(correct answer)
2. Valentina Volkova
3. Valentina Koroljova
4. Valentina Komarova

This was Olle Laurell's one million SEK question:

1,000,000 SEK (15 of 15)

Which of the following countries does not have a coastline on the Caspian Sea?

1. Turkmenistan
2. Kazakhstan(answer was eliminated either using the 50:50 lifeline or by choosing it while using the Double Dip lifeline)
3. Uzbekistan(correct answer)
4. Azerbaijan(answer was eliminated either using the 50:50 lifeline or by choosing it while using the Double Dip lifeline)

This was Torgny Segerstedt's one million SEK question:

1,000,000 SEK (15 of 15)

What symbol does Senegal have in the middle of its flag?

1. Moon
2. Bird
3. Cross
4. Star(correct answer)

This was Per Hörberg's one million SEK question:

1,000,000 SEK (15 of 15)

In what Chinese city can you visit the Terracotta Army that is guarding Qin Shi Huang's tomb?

1. Nanjing
2. Beijing
3. Shanghai
4. Xi'an(correct answer)
