= Stockholms Auktionsverk =

Swedish auction house

- Industry: Auction
- Founded: 1674
- Headquarters: Sweden
- Key people: Niclas Forsman
- Website: auktionsverket.com

Stockholms Auktionsverk (Swedish for "Stockholm's Auction House"), founded in 1674 in Sweden, is the world's oldest auction house.

High quality items are sold on auctions several times each year at the Nybrogatan showrooms in central Stockholm.

== History ==
This business was founded by Baron Claes Rålamb in 1674. Its services have been used by clients like Sweden's King Charles XI, who sold some hunting rifles for 900 silver coins, Sweden's King Gustav III, who acquired Rembrandt’s painting entitled The Kitchen Maid, and Swedish playwright August Strindberg, who purchased some books.

In 1993, private owners purchased Stockholms Auktionsverk from the City of Stockholm. Li Pamp is the current CEO.

== See also ==
- List of oldest fine art auction houses
