= Diggiloo =

Outdoor show in Sweden

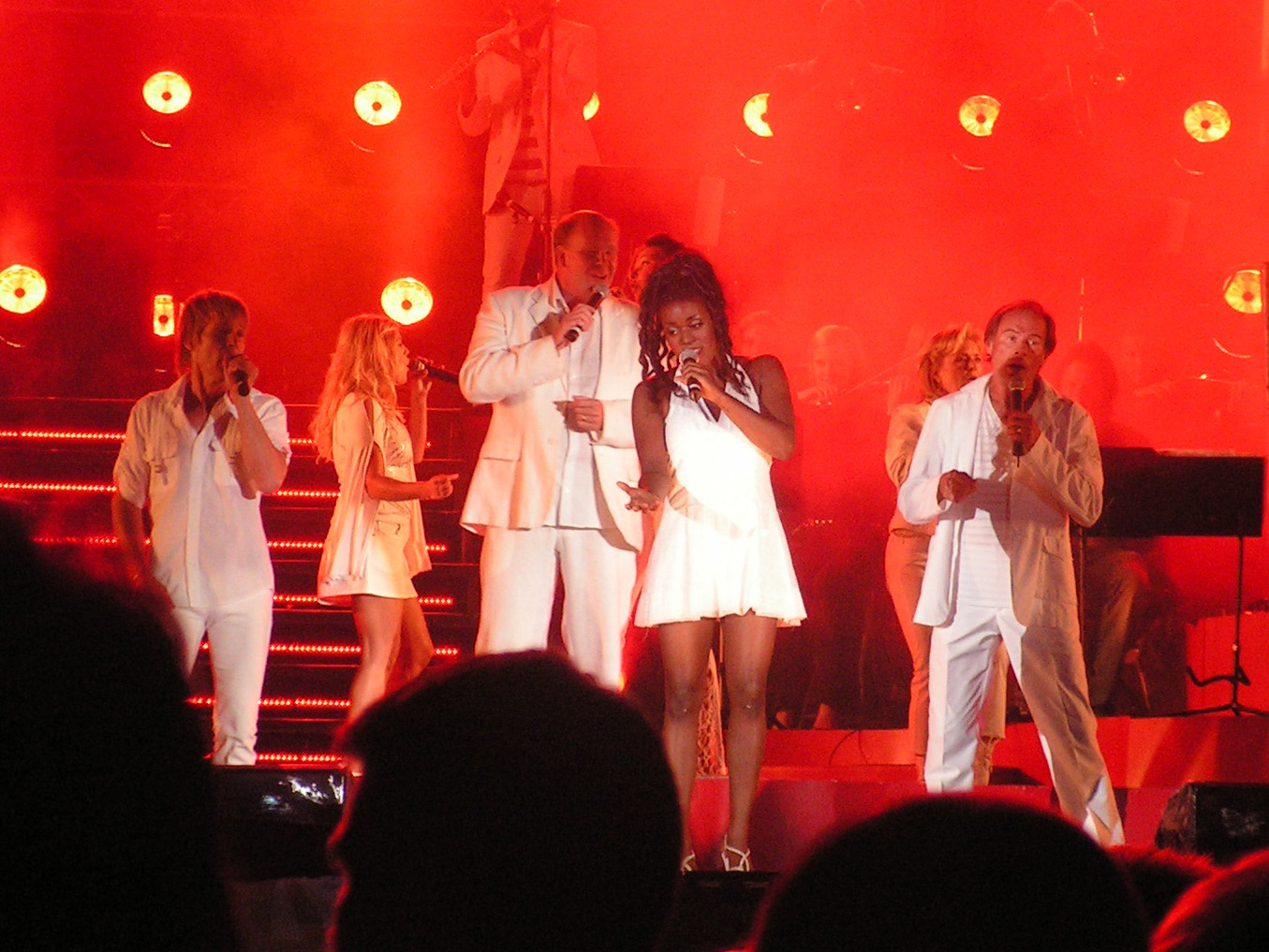
- The 2006 Diggiloo tour
- Status: active
- Genre: show
- Date: June-August
- Frequency: annual
- Country: Sweden
- Inaugurated: 2003
- Website: https://diggiloo.com/

Diggiloo is an outdoor summertime show where famous artists tour Sweden, performing songs accompanied by a live band. It debuted in 2003 with shows only in Båstad, before becoming a touring event in 2004. In 2020, due to the Covid 19 pandemic the tour was cancelled for the first time since its inception.

== Performers ==
Key: Singer Comedian Trumpeter

Performer	2003	2004	2005	2006	2007	2008	2009	2010	2011	2012	2013	2014	2015	2016	2017	2018	2019	2020	2021	2022	2023
Lasse Holm																					
Jessica Andersson																					
Lotta Engberg																					
Elisabeth Andreassen																					
Kikki Danielsson																					
Magnus Bäcklund																					
Siw Malmkvist																					
Lill-Babs																					
Ann-Louise Hanson																					
Stefan Odelberg																					
Sanna Nielsen																					
Magnus Johansson																					
Andrés Esteche																					
Sven-Erik Magnusson																					
Thomas Petersson																					
Christer Sjögren																					
Agneta Sjödin																					
Caroline Wennergren																					
Amy Diamond																					
Pernilla Wahlgren																					
Lasse Kronér																					
Charlotte Perrelli																					
Linda Bengtzing																					
Jan Johansen																					
Lasse Berghagen																					
Niklas Andersson																					
Molly Sandén																					
Benjamin Ingrosso																					
Nanne Grönvall																					
Måns Zelmerlöw																					
Stefan & Kim																					

== Gallery ==
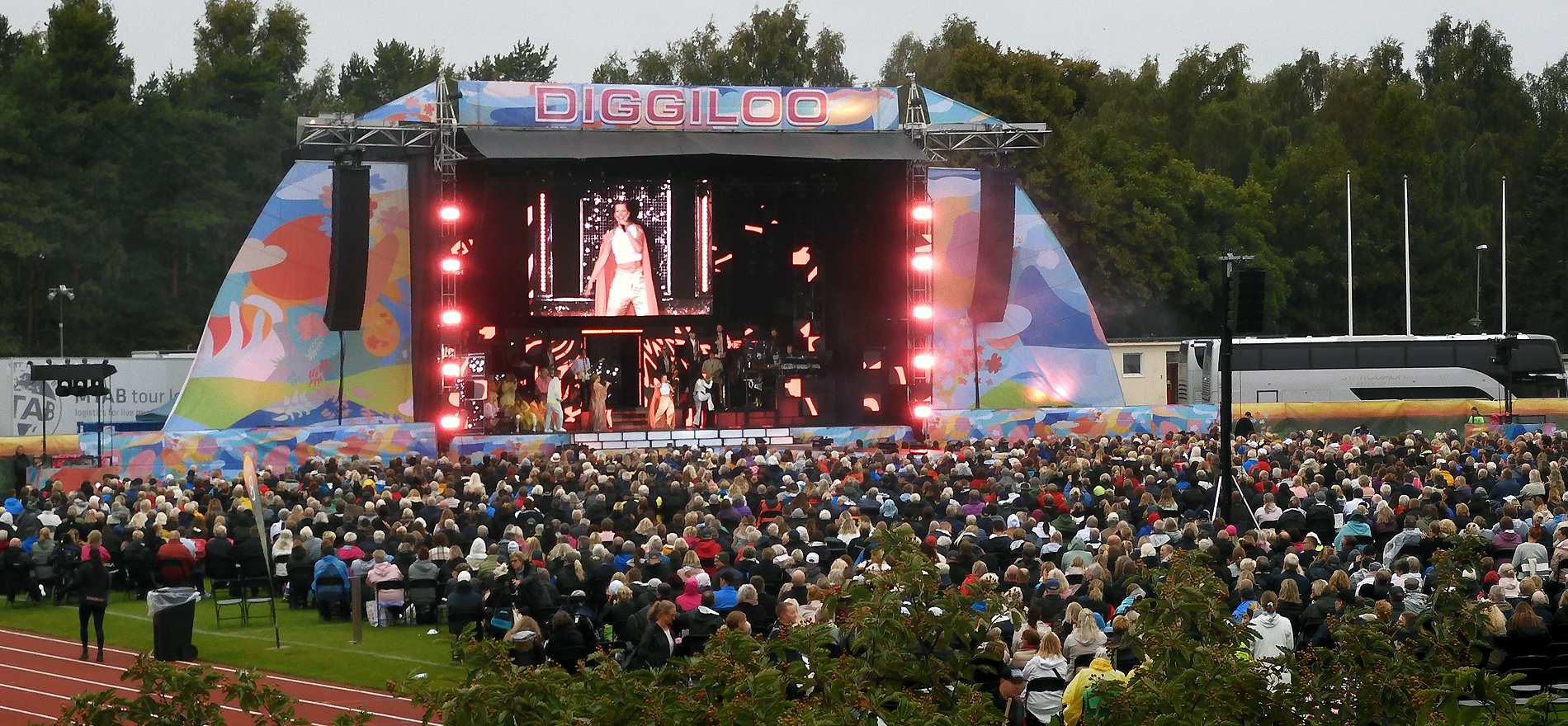
Diggiloo in Ystad 28 aug 2021.
