= Lulu Carter =

Swedish author and TV presenter (born 1961)

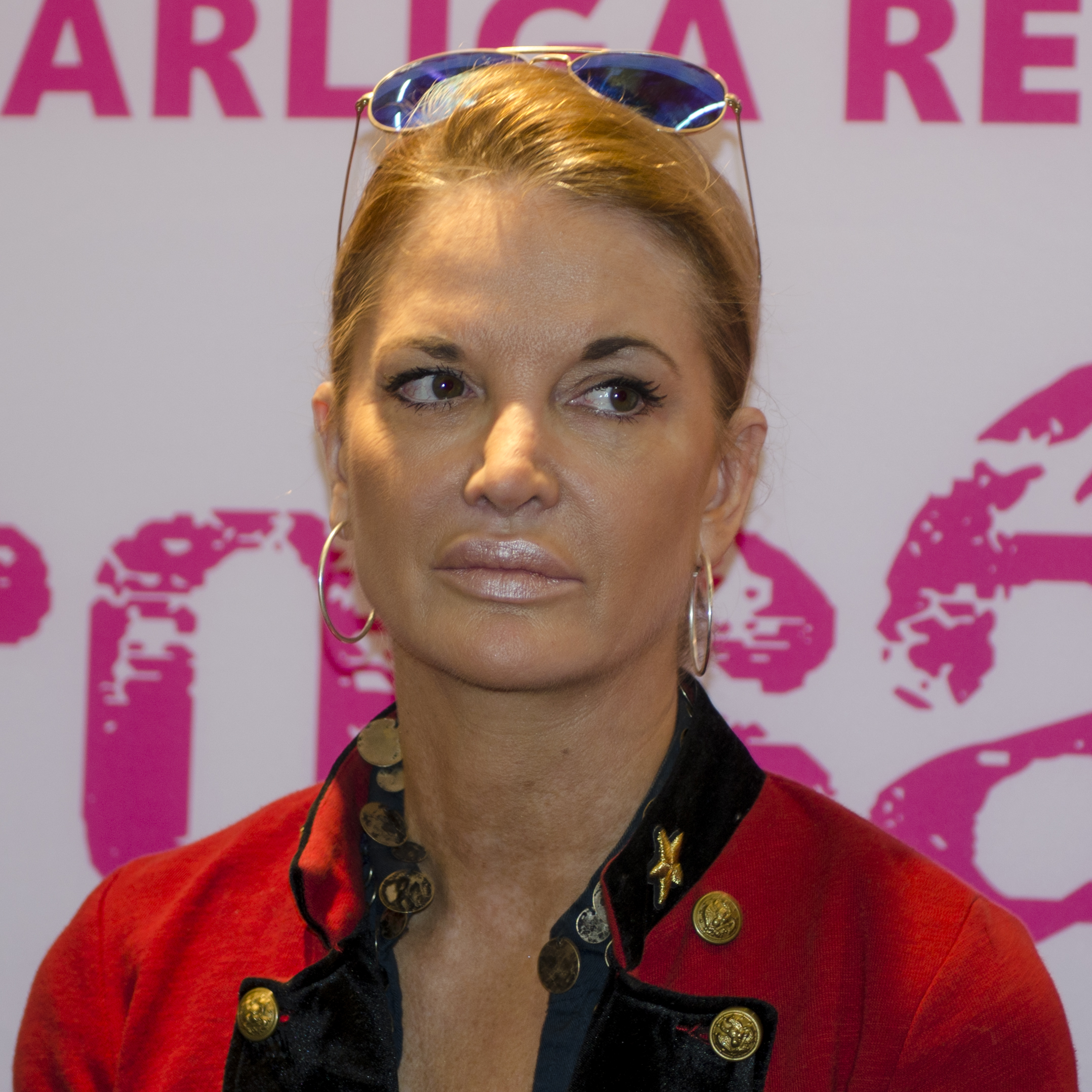
- Lulu Carter (2014)
- Born: 5 April 1961 (age 65); Vänersborg, Sweden
- Known for: Äntligen hemma, När & Fjärran

Louise Lulu Mushama Carter Arfwedson (born Ann Louise Arfwedsson, 5 April 1961) is a Swedish author and presenter on the television home improvement show Äntligen hemma, broadcast on TV4. Carter has also participated in the travel show När & Fjärran on the same channel. In 2008, Carter was a contestants in Stjärnor på is on TV4, however she was eliminated in the second episode. She has also competed in the show Wipeout on Kanal5. And the celebrity diving show Kändishoppet on TV3. She runs her own decorating company lulu Carter Inredning & Design.

Lulu Carter was born in Vänersborg and was the youngest of four siblings, and at the age of three she and her family moved to Gällivare were Lulu attended a Sami private school. She was one of two non-sami children at the school. In her book Sinnliga rum describes her childhood in Gällivare as a precious gift, a period of her life has given her much inspiration as a decorator.

After a few years in Gällivare her family moved to Dalarna, There they lived in a house that had belonged to Emma Zorn, the wife of artist Anders Zorn. At the age of sixteen Carter moved to Stockholm to be an intern at the women's magazine Damernas Värld.

When Carter was 23 years old she met her first husband, Peter Lennig who is a doctor. Their relationship lasted for ten years and the couple had two children. In 2000 she married Australian Darren Carter who is a model. In October 2007, she married Rainer Bolm at the Swedish embassy in Marrakech. The couple separated in 2010.

Carter received attention in 2017 when she accused the Äntligen hemma co-star Martin Timell of sexual abuse. These accusations and those of other women made Timell being fired from his job as host of the show. And Äntligen hemma was temporarily cancelled.

== Bibliography ==
- Sinnliga rum: konsten att inreda med hjärtat (2013)
