= Sanden =

Sanden may refer to:

== Business ==
- Sanden Corporation, a Japanese heating and cooling company (automotive and commercial)

== Places ==
- Sanden, Indonesia, a subdistrict in Bantul Regency, Special Region of Yogyakarta, Indonesia
- Sanden, Nordland, a village in Hadsel municipality, Nordland county, Norway
- Sanden, Mandal, an area in the town of Mandal, Vest-Agder county, Norway

== People ==
- Frida Sandén (born 1994), a Swedish singer
- John Howard Sanden (1935-2022), an American portrait artist
- Mimmi Sandén (born 1995), a Swedish singer
- Molly Sandén (born 1992), a Swedish singer
- Shanice van de Sanden (born 1992), a Dutch football striker
