= Talang 2007 =

Season of Swedish television series

- Genre: Interactive reality game show
- Presented by: Peppe Eng
- Starring: Tobbe Blom; Hanna Hedlund; Bert Karlsson
- Country of origin: Sweden
- Original language: Swedish
- No. of seasons: 1
- No. of episodes: 8

Production
- Producer: Karin Stjärne
- Running time: 1 hr Final: 1.5 hr

Original release
- Network: TV4
- Release: 13 April – 1 June 2007

Related
- Talang 2008

Talang 2007 was the first season of the show Talang, the Swedish version of Got Talent. Talang 2007 had its premiere on 13 April 2007 and ended on 1 June 2007. The winner of the show was Zillah & Totte. This season was hosted by Peppe Eng, and the judges were: Tobbe Blom, Hanna Hedlund and Bert Karlsson.

== Popularity ==
The show became an instant success and was consistently one of the top three television shows in Sweden each week.

Episode	Date	Three most watched TV shows in Sweden by week		
Episode	Date	No. 1	No. 2	No. 3
1	2007-04-13	Wallander – Innan frosten (movie, part 1 of 13); TV4, Sunday; 1 590 000	Talang 2007; TV4, Friday; 1 535 000	Playa del Sol (comedy); SVT1, Sunday; 1 315 000
2	2007-04-20	Talang 2007; TV4, Friday; 1 620 000	Wallander – Byfånen (movie, part 2 of 13); TV4, Sunday; 1 595 000	Postkodmiljonären (quiz game show); TV4, Friday; 1 260 000
3	2007-04-27	Wallander – Bröderna (movie, part 3 of 13); TV4, Sunday; 1 375 000	Talang 2007; TV4, Friday; 1 315 000	Postkodmiljonären; TV4, Saturday; 1 005 000
4	2007-05-04	Wallander – Mörkret (movie, part 4 of 13); TV4, Sunday; 1 495 000	Talang 2007; TV4, Friday; 1 490 000	Postkodmiljonären; TV4, Saturday; 1 075 000
5	2007-05-11	Eurovision Song Contest, final SVT1, Saturday; 3 425 000	Wallander – Afrikanen (movie, part 5 of 13); TV4, Sunday; 1 570 000	Talang 2007; TV4, Friday; 1 480 000
6	2007-05-18	Talang 2007; TV4, Friday; 1 260 000	Bonde söker fru (match-making); TV4, Saturday; 1 205 000	Postkodmiljonären; TV4, Saturday; 1 155 000
7	2007-05-25	Talang 2007; TV4, Friday; 1 145 000	Sommarkrysset med lottodragningen (song and music); TV4, Saturday; 1 070 000	Anna Pihl (crime drama series); TV4, Monday; 950 000
8	2007-06-01	Talang 2007; TV4, Friday; 1 640 000	Time out (comedy); TV4, Friday; 1 290 000	Sportspegeln (sports news); SVT1, Sunday; 1 085 000

Public voting started when the program aired on Friday and ended at midnight Sunday. Unlike the American TV series, where the public voted for free by calling a toll free number, the Swedish audience paid 5.70 Swedish kronor (June 2007, approximately US$0.82) for each call they made.

After the second semi-final aired, TV4 surprised the contestants by announcing that two wild card finalists would be chosen from the eliminated semi-finalists. One wild card finalist was chosen by the jury whilst the other was chosen by public vote. With only two days to prepare for the final competition, the wild card finalists had little chance of winning.

For the final program (episode 8), the winner was chosen only by public vote. Despite that, the jury still voted and commented on each performance. Voting started when the program started at 8 pm and concluded at some undisclosed time during the 1.5 hr long program. The voting procedure potentially gave an unfair advantage to contestants who performed early in the show. Indeed, the winner of Talang 2007 performed first. Furthermore, all of the phone numbers for each contestant were published before the show, allowing the public to vote for their favorite contestant before they had given their final performance.

== Auditions Summary ==
Judge Disapproved | Judge Approved
All 3 Judges Approved | All 3 Judges Disapproved

=== Semi-finalists By Jury ===
Name	Act	Jury's Vote		
Name	Act	Karlsson	Hedlund	Blom
Fantastic Four	Motown singers			
Zillah & Totte	Ventriloquist			
Maria Lundgren	Hula Hoop Dancer			
Swebounce	Stilt Performers			
Artan Kajtazi	Dancer			
Mimmi Sandén	Singer			
Slowmotion Phax	Slow Motion Act			
Baby Bang	Dancer			
Funky 4 Brothers	Dance Group			
Diamond Dogs	Drag Show			
Mahyar Samadi	Beatboxer			
Simon Trollkarlen	Magician			
Landslide	Band			
Robotman	Novelty Act			
Eric Lindeen	Yo-yo Artist			
Melissa Jacobsson-Velandia	Pianist			
Julien Dauphin	Magician			
Male	Singing Group			
Skånske Elia	Singer			
Hilda Stenmalm	Singer			
Linda Johansson	Aerialist			
Sara Nordenberg-Borch	Singer & Conguero			
Johan Ståhl	Magician			
Harlem Hot Shots	Dance Troupe			

=== Non Semi-Finalist By Jury ===
Name	Act	Jury's Vote		
Name	Act	Karlsson	Hedlund	Blom
Fabian Nikolajeff	Tumbling Acrobat			
Tommy Adolfsson	Sea Shell Musician			
Olana Troupe	Acrobats			
Elin Andersson	Acrobat			
Irish Dance Project	Irish Dance Group			
Paulina Fröling	Singer			
Filiokus Fredrik	Comedian/Shadow Artist			
Hanna Linné & Timo Lattu	Acrobatic Duo			
Sophie Sjörén	Singer			
Three D	Singing Group			
Changiz John	Record Breaker			
Mattias Jönsson	Juggler			
Nikisha Fogo	Ballet Dancer			

=== Eliminated By Jury ===
Name	Act	Jury's Vote		
Name	Act	Karlsson	Hedlund	Blom
The Big Ass Barbecue	Lassoo Artists			
Svetlana Biba	Mime			
Mr Ekooo	Echo Comedian			
The Bläckfisks	Singing & Dancing Group			
Artistgruppen Regnbågen	Singing Group			
Anna Kråik	Singer & Drummer			
Octagon Crew	Breakdancers			
Nomad	Fire Baton Twirler			
Greece	Singing Group			
Tommie Meyer	Human Pin Cushion			
Capoeira group	Capoeira artists			
Alexandra Telluselle	Hula Dancer			
Burnt Out Punks	Fire Act			
Coffee Beans Show	Choir			
Ismannen	Ice Sculptor			
Sanne Hansen	Closed Mouth Singer			
Ania & Sara Albertsson	Singing Duo			
Victor Rubilar	Football Juggler			
Cyclingteam	Unicycle Group			
Sandra Camenish	Singer			
Moa Lichtenstein & Sarah Runsten	Acrobatic Duo			
Stockholms gaykör och pomperipossaband	Band & Choir			
Johnny Wahlqvist	Strongman			
Marina Prada & Ibirocay Regueira	Salsa Dancers			
Gycklargruppen	Jesters			
Siw-Marie Andersson	Yodeller			
Ormtjusaren Tina Holmgren	Snake Charmer			
The Battle Dwarfs	Breakdance Crew			
Lilia Tchoumatchenko	Singer			
Eddie Karlsson	Singer & Guitarist			
Tony Livonen	Accordion Player			
David Barnes	Singer			
Garvsyra	Dance & Music Duo			
Tommy Tångs	Clowns			
Zoo Orkestern	Dancing Band			
Vendela Duclos	Singer			
The Bucketeers	Bucket Jugglers			
Monica Ramos	Singer & Harpist			
Karina Nilsson	Accordion Player			
Jessica Wimert	Singer & Pianist			
Jesper Joe	Chainsaw Juggler			
Beef noodles	Dance Troupe			
Ava Bahari	Violinist			

== Semi-finals Summary ==
During the three semi-finals (episodes 5–7), two finalists were chosen from each program, one by the jury and another by public vote. The public voted for a contestant by phoning a specific telephone number, which was published before the show aired.

Judge Disapproved | Judge Approved
Won the public vote | Won the Jury's vote | All 3 Judges Disapproved

=== Semi-final 1 ===
Semi-Finalist	Order	Act	Jury's Vote			Results
Semi-Finalist	Order	Act	Karlsson	Hedlund	Blom	Results
Funky 4 Brothers	1	Dance Group				Eliminated
Zillah & Totte	2	Ventriloquist				Jury's choice
Robotman	3	Novelty Act				Eliminated
Maria Lundgren	4	Hula Hoop Dancer				Eliminated
Artan Kajtazi	5	Dancer				Eliminated
Fantastic Four	6	Motown Group				Eliminated
Swebounce	7	Stilt Performers				Eliminated
Baby Bang	8	Dancer				Won Public Vote

=== Semi-final 2 ===
Semi-Finalist	Order	Act	Jury's Vote			Results
Semi-Finalist	Order	Act	Karlsson	Hedlund	Blom	Results
Slowmotion Phax	1	Slow Motion Act				Eliminated
Skånske Elia	2	Singer				Won Public Vote
Landslide	3	Band				Eliminated
Linda Johansson	4	Aerialist				Eliminated
Hilda Stenmalm	5	Singer				Eliminated
Mahyar Samadi	6	Beatboxer				Eliminated
Simon Trollkarlen	7	Magician				Eliminated
Harlem Hot Shots	8	Dance Troupe				Jury's choice

=== Semi-final 3 ===
Semi-Finalist	Order	Act	Jury's Vote			Results
Semi-Finalist	Order	Act	Karlsson	Hedlund	Blom	Results
Julien Dauphin	1	Magician				Jury's choice
Mimmi Sandén	2	Singer				Won Public Vote
Eric Lindeen	3	Yo-yo Artist				Eliminated
Sara Nordenberg-Borch	4	Singer & Conguero				Eliminated
Johan Ståhl	5	Magician				Eliminated
Male	6	Singing Group				Eliminated
Melissa Jacobsson-Velandia	7	Pianist				Eliminated
Diamond Dogs	8	Drag Show				Eliminated

== Final ==
Judge Disapproved | Judge Approved
Winner | All 3 Judges Disapproved

Finalist	Order	Act	Jury's Vote			Results
Finalist	Order	Act	Karlsson	Hedlund	Blom	Results
Zillah & Totte	1	Ventriloquist				Winner
Julien Dauphin	2	Magician				Eliminated
Baby Bang	3	Dancer				Eliminated
Harlem Hot Shots	4	Dance Troupe				Eliminated
Mimmi Sandén	5	Singer				Eliminated
Slowmotion Phax	6	Slow Motion Act				Eliminated
Skånske Elias	7	Singer				Eliminated
Diamond Dogs	8	Drag Show				Eliminated

== Winner ==
Zillah & Totte when the winner was announced.

Zillah & Totte

Totte is Zillah's three-year-old (stuffed animal) chimpanzee. The duo talk, sing, and perform magic tricks together for their comical performances. For the winning performance, Zillah & Totte sang Herreys "Diggi-loo diggi-ley" on a stage with large letters that spelled TOTTE. In the middle of the song, Zillah fell backwards over the letters and Totte blamed her for destroying their chance to win. "Now you owe me a million!" said Totte to Zillah before first demanding the audience to vote for him and then sweetly asking for their vote. The strategy worked as they not only won the jury's votes but also votes of the public.

== Contestants ==
Many of the contestants in Talang 2007 are professional entertainers, have family ties in the entertainment business, had previously won talent competitions, or were completing an education specializing in their art form. Participating on the show gave them free publicity for their business and/or art form. A couple of contestants were requested by TV4 or a jury member to participate in the show.

- Julien Dauphin is a professional magician who won the 2006 Swedish Championships in Magic and the 2004 Nordic Championships in Magic, and placed 6th in the 2006 World Championships in Magic. Prior to Talang 2007, he performed one time with jury member Blom. He was requested by TV4 to participate in Talang 2007 and first turned down the request before finally agreeing to compete. Julien Dauphin made it to the finals and was one of the jury's favorite contestants.
- The Harlem Hot Shots is a professional dance troupe that specializes in African American dances such as Lindy Hop, Tap dance and Blues dance. The members are internationally recognized dance instructors and performers. They organize and/or teach at the annual Herräng Dance Camp, the world's largest dance camp of its genre. For Talang 2007, their talent was Lindy Hop and they primarily performed Lindy Hop routines at high tempos with many acrobatics. For their final performance however, they started with a short segment of blues dancing and were criticized by jury member Blom for social dancing on stage. The Harlem Hot Shots participated in Talang 2007 to interest the public in the Lindy Hop dance.
- While the parents of Mimmi Sandén are not singers, Mimmi has two older sisters who are: Molly Sandén and Frida Sandén. The sisters have competed in several talent competitions including Stjärnskott 2006 (Molly placed 1st) and Stage Junior 2006 (Molly placed 1st, Frida and Mimmi qualified). They are often backing singers for each other. For example, Molly and Frida were backing singers for Mimmi during her final performance for Talang 2007. Also Frida and Mimmi were backing singers for Molly during her final performance for Stage Junior 2006. The three sisters met jury member Karlsson during Stage Junior 2006.
- The father of Skånske Elias (Elias Andersson), Richard Andersson, is a musician and songwriter that has created several neo-classical metal bands. In 2006, Skånske Elias competed and won the Ung Talang 2006 talent competition and placed 2nd in Stjärnskott 2006. Skånske Elias made it to the finals of Talang 2007 and was one of Karlsson's and the audience's favorite contestants.
- Diamond Dogs is a professional drag show team that was created in 2002 by Peter Englund and Reine Tapper. Many popular Swedish artists, such as Linda Bengtzing, Shirley Clamp and Sonja Aldén, have recorded parodies of themselves for the team. Diamond Dogs was surprised to be selected as a wild card finalist but managed to create a new performance, a parody of Talang 2007, for the final show. While jury members Blom and Hedlund thought that Diamond Dogs should not win the competition and gave them red Xs, they found their performance to be very entertaining and also gave them green checks.
- The female country music band Landslide had disbanded after graduating from gymnasium, but were requested to participate in Talang 2007 by jury member Karlsson. Karlsson had paid for a large colored advertisement in the evening newspaper Expressen to search for them, which they didn't see. Three days before the program recording date, Karlsson called one of the band members and asked them to participate in the show. After some discussion, they agreed to do so and spent the next few days practicing together. They received green check marks from Karlsson during both their audition and semi-final performances.
- During Talang 2007, Melissa Jacobsson-Velandia was a student in the music program at Södra Latin, an elite gymnasium in Stockholm for Sweden's best artists and musicians. She won several scholarships and contests for piano playing, e.g., she won the 2006 SPPF (Swedish Piano Instructor Association) Inspiration Scholarship, the 2007 Steinway Student VIP Prize, and the 2007 Steinway Piano Festival. For Talang 2007, she played difficult classical music pieces that the general public was not familiar with, such as "Gnomenreigen" by Franz Liszt (episode 3). Unfortunately this worked against her. Jury member Karlsson felt that her talent did not belong in the program, partly because it was not a profitable enough talent, and she did not receive enough votes to continue to the finals.

== Controversy and criticism ==
To make the show appeal to a wide audience, the producers attempted to change the jury's decision during the filming of episode 3. TV4 wanted a mix of males and females to continue from the auditions whereas Karlsson felt that quality should determine whether a contestant continued or not.

During the semi-finals, the jury intentionally only selected adult competitors to continue to the finals since they thought the public would only vote for children and the final program would become a children's show. Debates in the TV4 Talang 2007 forum about the public's tendency to vote for child acts and whether adults and children should compete in the same show were ongoing throughout the entire season. The host, Peppe Eng, had to rush the jury through their comments for each contestant to keep the show on schedule. Furthermore, TV4 sabotaged the show's climax by showing the name of the winner to the TV audience before the winner was announced; when the card containing the winner's name was removed from the envelope, the winner's name faced the camera.
