= Talang 2010 =

- Genre: Interactive reality game show
- Presented by: Markoolio; Tobbe Blom
- Starring: Bert Karlsson; Charlotte Perrelli; Johan Pråmell
- Country of origin: Sweden
- Original language: Swedish
- No. of episodes: 11

Production
- Executive producer: Matilda Snöwall
- Production location: Fia Fång
- Running time: 90 minutes

Original release
- Network: TV4
- Release: April 2 – June 4, 2010

Related
- Talang 2009; Talang 2011

Talang 2010 was the fourth season of the talent show Talang, the Swedish version of Got Talent. Talang 2010 had its premiere on April 2, 2010 and ended on June 4, 2010. The winner of the show was the 15-year-old opera singer Jill Svensson, and 9-year-old violinist Daniel Lozakovitj came runner-up. Hosts and judges were the same as in Talang 2009. Omar Rudberg was a contestant.

== Turnén ==
=== Castings ===
- 12 December 2009 - Norrköping, Hageby centre
- 9 January 2010 - Borås, Knalleland
- 23 January 2010 - Lycksele, Åhléns
- 23 January 2010 - Akalla, ICA Maxi
- 24 January 2010 - Sundschoicel, Birsta city
- 30 January 2010 - Uddechoicela, Torp shopping centre
- 31 January 2010 - Jönköping, A6 center
- 6 February 2010 - Stockholm, Globen shopping centre
- 7 February 2010 - Linköping, IKANO-house
- 13 February 2010 - Löddeköpinge, Lödde centre
- 20 February 2010 - Stockholm, Saltsjöbadens centre
- 21 February 2010 - Stockholm, Stinsen
- 27 February 2010 - Luleå, Street maal

== Semi-final Summary ==
Judge Disapproved | Judge Approved
Won the public vote | Won the Jury's vote | Eliminated

=== Semi-final 1 ===
Semi-Finalist	Order	Act	Jury's Vote			Results
Semi-Finalist	Order	Act	Pråmell	Perrelli	Karlsson	Results
Twisted Feet	1	Dance Troupe				Eliminated
Per Högberg	2	Pianist				Eliminated
Stephen Hansen	3	Singer				Jury's choice
Cold Mountain Band	4	Bluegrass Band				Eliminated
Carl Tillenius	5	Magician				Eliminated
The Double G	6	Dance Group				Eliminated
Top Cats	7	Rockabilly Band				Lost Jury's Vote
Jill Svensson	8	Opera Singer				Won Public Vote

=== Semi-final 2 ===
Semi-Finalist	Order	Act	Jury's Vote			Results
Semi-Finalist	Order	Act	Pråmell	Perrelli	Karlsson	Results
SweEts	1	Dance Troupe				Lost Jury's Vote
Helena Salo	2	Singer				Won Public Vote
Karin Kjeldgaard	3	Tightrope Dancer				Eliminated
Moa Johan'sson	4	Singer				Jury's choice
Reginald Simon	5	Magician				Eliminated
Dapony Bros	6	Band				Eliminated
Micke Maskin	7	Acrobat				Eliminated
BCO	8	Drag Show				Eliminated

=== Semi-final 3 ===
Semi-Finalist	Order	Act	Jury's Vote			Results
Semi-Finalist	Order	Act	Pråmell	Perrelli	Karlsson	Results
Babydollz	1	Dance Troupe				Eliminated
Daniel Lozakovitj	2	Fiddle Player				Jury's choice
SIMSOAK	3	Reggae Band				Eliminated
Micke Askernäs	4	Mentalist				Eliminated
AC Quartet	5	Barbershop Quartet				Eliminated
Elin König-Andersson	6	Acrobat				Lost Jury's Vote
Zirkus Hanz	7	Dance Group				Eliminated
Freddy Amigo	8	Opera Singer				Won Public Vote

== Final ==
Judge Disapproved | Judge Approved
Winner

Finalist	Order	Act	Jury's Vote			Results
Finalist	Order	Act	Pråmell	Perrelli	Karlsson	Results
Moa Johan'sson	1	Singer				Eliminated
Daniel Lozakovitj	2	Fiddle Player				Runner-up
Helena Salo	3	Singer				Eliminated
Elin König-Andersson	4	Acrobat				Eliminated
Freddy Amigo	5	Opera Singer				Eliminated
Stephen Hansen	6	Singer				Eliminated
Zirkus Hanz	7	Dance Group				Eliminated
Jill Svensson	8	Opera Singer				Won Public Vote
