= Vivianne Franzén =

Swedish politician (born 1943)

Member of the Riksdag
- In office 1991–1994
- Constituency: Stockholm County

Personal details
- Born: Vivianne Margareta Franzén; 2 June 1943 (age 82) Bromma, Sweden
- Party: New Democracy

Vivianne Margareta Franzén (born 2 June 1943) is a Swedish retired politician and cosmetologist.

She served as a Member of the Riksdag following the 1991 Swedish general election representing the New Democracy party. In 1994, she was elected leader of the party to replace Ian Wachtmeister after Wachtmeister's initial replacement Harriet Colliander was removed from the position. During Franzén's presidency, New Democracy lost its parliamentary seats in 1994. Franzén was outspoken in her opposition to Sweden's immigration policies and Islam in Sweden during her time in politics which sometimes caused controversy.
