= Talang 2008 =

- Logo
- Genre: Interactive reality game show
- Presented by: Peppe Eng; Kodjo Akolor
- Starring: Tobbe Blom; Sofia Wistam; Bert Karlsson
- Country of origin: Sweden
- Original language: Swedish
- No. of episodes: 10

Production
- Running time: 90 minutes

Original release
- Network: TV4
- Release: April 4 – May 30, 2008

Related
- Talang 2007; Talang 2009

Talang 2008 was the second season of the talent show Talang, the Swedish version of Got Talent. It was broadcast from April 4, 2008 to May 30, 2008. The host was only one person, Peppe Eng, with Kodjo Akolor as his "sidekick". The paBert Karlsson, Sofia Wistam and Tobbe Blom.

This season was won by 10-year-old singer Zara Larsson, who received the prize money of 50 SEK as a result.

The audition tour visited Falun, Umeå, Malmö, Gothenburg and Stockholm. All auditions took place in March 2008, one month before the season started broadcasting on TV.

== Finalists ==
- Jongleur Johan Wellton
- Pianist David Fang
- Singer Sebastian Krantz
- Magician Seth Engström
- Singer Sofia med storbandet
- Pianist Karina Sarkisyan
- Rapper RMK & Co
- Singer Zara Larsson (WINNER)

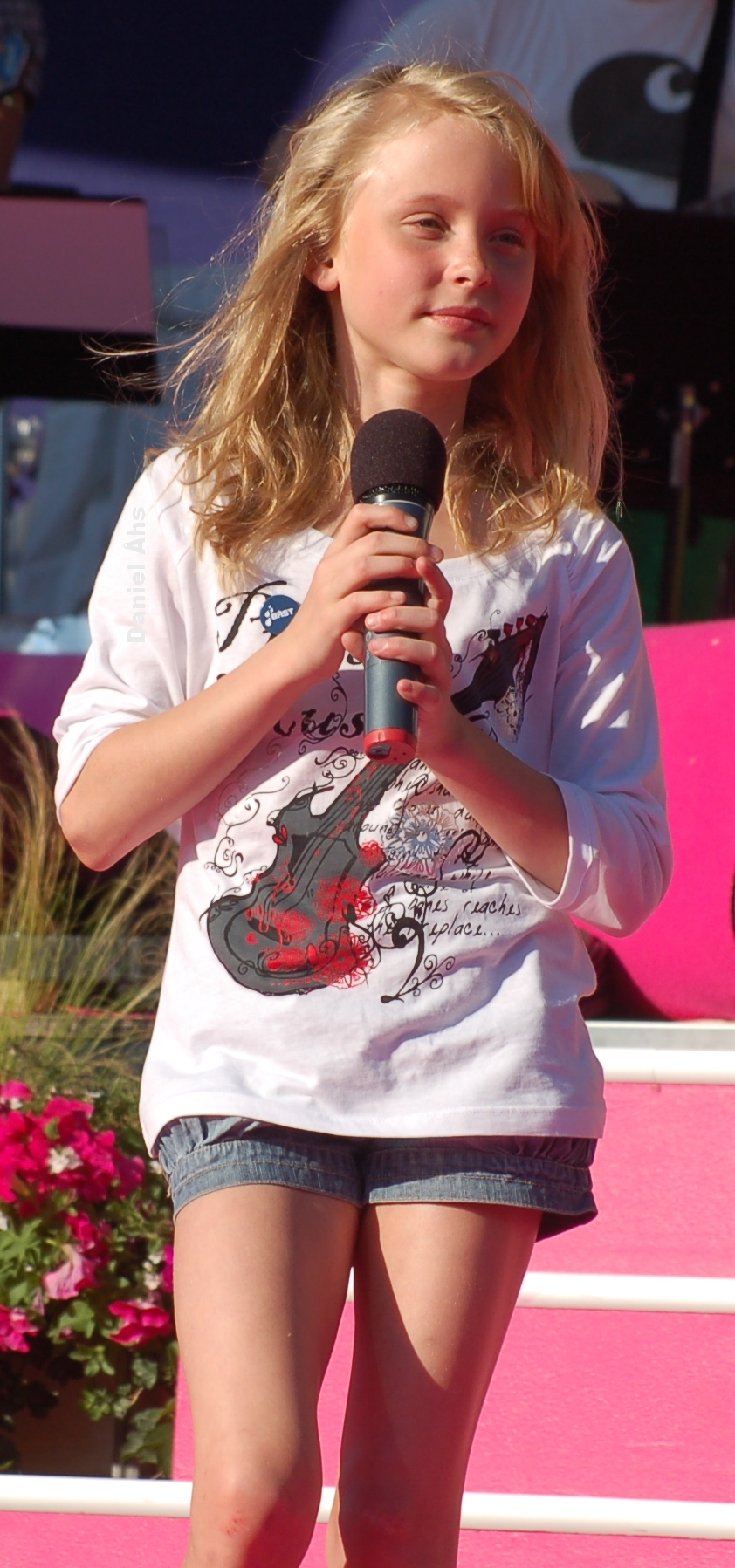
