= Talang 2009 =

- Genre: Interactive reality game show
- Presented by: Markoolio; Tobbe Blom
- Starring: Bert Karlsson; Charlotte Perrelli; Johan Pråmell
- Country of origin: Sweden
- Original language: Swedish
- No. of episodes: 11

Production
- Running time: 90 minutes

Original release
- Network: TV4
- Release: 3 April – 12 June 2009

Related
- Talang 2008; Talang 2010

Talang 2009 was the third season of the talent show Talang, the Swedish version of Got Talent. Talang 2009 had its premiere on April 3, 2009. The winner of the show was 30-year-old magician Charlie Caper, and 12-year-old piano player David Movsesian came runner-up. This season was hosted by Markoolio and Tobbe Blom, and the judges were: Bert Karlsson, Charlotte Perrelli and Johan Pråmell.

== List of those who made it to the final audition ==
=== Episode 1 (Kalmar) ===
Broadcast on Friday, April 3.

1. Max Carling - walking on tightrope
2. The Rockettes - vocal trio
3. Eamonn O’Reily - troubadour
4. Pernilla Ingvarsdotter - opera
5. Ingo - magician playing cards
6. Erik Linder - singing
7. Beatbox Libban - beatboxing
8. Elin Wennström - singing
9. Pos från skogen - rockband
10. Aari Haatainen - accordion
11. Cirkus Saga - circus tricks
12. Lasse Nachtweij - juggling on unicycle
13. Santiago "Kouki" Obama - dance

=== Episode 2 (Stockholm) ===
Broadcast on Friday, April 10.

1. Vincente Opera - magic suitcase
2. Anastassia Johansson - rhythmic gymnastics
3. Whiplash - dance
4. Clara Hagman - singing
5. BoBBo - juggling
6. The Goose - singing
7. The Hebbe Sisters - singing
8. Duchess Dubois - burlesque striptease
9. Axel Adlercreutz - tricks
10. Alexander & Daniel Lindman - fakir tricks
11. David Hammarberg - circus tricks
12. Splash - dance
13. Electrified - singing and dancing
14. The Untitled Quartet - singing

=== Episode 3 (Stockholm) ===
Broadcast on Friday, April 17.

1. Marcus Wiander - kong
2. Börje & Jimmy - cage and card magic
3. Lennart Bång - spoken word
4. Stardogs - dog tricks
5. Ludde van Halen - guitar
6. Alexander Mood - singing
7. Knäckebrödsdansen - naked dancing
8. Niclas Christoffer - stand up
9. David Movsesian - piano
10. Emma Berglund - singing
11. Christoffer Skoog - singing
12. Charlie Caper - magic
13. Daniel Samuelsson - juggling
14. Tomas Lundman - football tricks
15. Manda - acrobatics
16. Emma Risbo - singing

=== Episode 4 (Kalmar) ===
Broadcast on Friday, April 24

1. Magnus Kviske - singing like an LP
2. Rebecka Karlsson - singing
3. Oliver Cartea - magic
4. Agge - singing
5. Tobias Chilli - card tricks and acrobatics
6. Ken Waegas - Elvis imitation
7. C-G & Blåljus - singing
8. Blomman & Olsson - singing
9. Tuta & Kör - child gymnastics and singing
10. Christoffer Daun - singing
11. Emelia Persson - singing
12. Mikael Persson - singing and ukulele
13. Julie Hansson - singing

=== Episode 5 (Göteborg) ===
Broadcast on Friday, May 8.

1. Victor Pettersson - singing
2. Flammable - hardrock band
3. Linda Karlsson Johbarn – singing and music
4. Erika Selin - singing
5. Damorkeztern – singing
6. Team Magic – magic
7. Peehigh – rap
8. Bröderna Fröidh – humor songs
9. Andreas Lindkvist – cycling
10. Riku Koponen – card magic
11. VLO – ball tricks
12. Brynolf & Ljung – breakout
13. Erik Martinson – singing and ukulele

=== Episode 6 (Stockholm) ===
Broadcast on Friday, May 15.

1. Martin Kjellgren - talking with children voice
2. Julle United Allstars - cheerleeding dance
3. Jakob Stenberg - counting letters in words
4. Men - singing group
5. Rainbow Sisters - drag show
6. Smash Into Pieces - rockband
7. Akira - dance
8. Malin Jakobsson - spoken word
9. Redeemer - singing piano
10. Sharon - singing

=== List of those who advanced to the semifinals ===
==== Semifinal 1 ====
Broadcast on Friday, May 22.

1. Whiplash - dance
2. Emma Risbo - singing
3. Max Carling - circus tricks
4. Victor Pettersson - singing
5. Börje & Jimmy - magic with gorilla
6. Men - singing group
7. Nastja - rhythmic gymnastics
8. Lennart Bång - spoken word

In the finals:

- Victor Pettersson - singing (viewers' favorite)
- Men - singing group (judges' favorite)

==== Semifinal 2 ====
Broadcast on Friday, May, 29.

1. Julle United Allstars - cheerleeding dance
2. David Movsesian - piano
3. Vincente Opera - magic
4. Malin Jakobsson - spoken word
5. Blomman & Olsson - singing and guitar
6. Alexander & Daniel Lindman - fakir tricks
7. The Hebbe Sisters - singing
8. Charlie Caper - magic

In the finals:

- Charlie Caper - magic (viewers' favorite)
- David Movsesian - piano (judges' favorite)

==== Semifinal 3 ====
Broadcast on Friday, June 5.

1. Stardogs - dog tricks
2. Erik Linder - singing
3. Electrified - singing and dancing
4. Martin Kjellgren - talking with children voice
5. Julie Hansson - singing
6. Brynolf & Ljung - magic
7. C-G & Blåljus - singing
8. Akira - dancing

In the finals:

- Akira - dance (viewers' favorite)
- Brynolf & Ljung - magic (judges' favorite)

==== Wildcards ====
- Erik Linder - singing (viewers' wildcard)
- Nastja - gymnastics (judges' wildcard)
