= Anropar försvunnen =

2000 song by Hanna Hedlund

Single by Hanna Hedlund
- A-side: "Anropar försvunnen"
- B-side: "Anropar försvunnen" (sing yourself-version)
- Released: March 2000
- Genre: schlager
- Label: Lionheart International
- Songwriters: Anna-Lena Högdahl; Bobby Ljunggren; Robert Uhlmann

"Anropar försvunnen" is a song written by Bobby Ljunggren, Robert Uhlmann and Anna-Lena Högdahl, and performed by Hanna Hedlund at Melodifestivalen 2000, where it ended up in eighth place.

The single peaked at number 11 on the Swedish Singles Chart and on 25 March 2000, the song received a Svensktoppen test, but failed to enter the chart.

However the song was popular in Swedish radio, receiving a lot of airplay, and among school-aged children. The song's lyrics are spaceflight-related.

The song was originally intended to be performed by Hanna Hedlund and Linda Bengtzing.

== Charts ==
Chart (2000)	Peak position
Sweden (Sverigetopplistan)	11
