= 1991 Swedish general election =

- 15 September 1991

All 349 seats in the Riksdag 175 seats needed for a majority
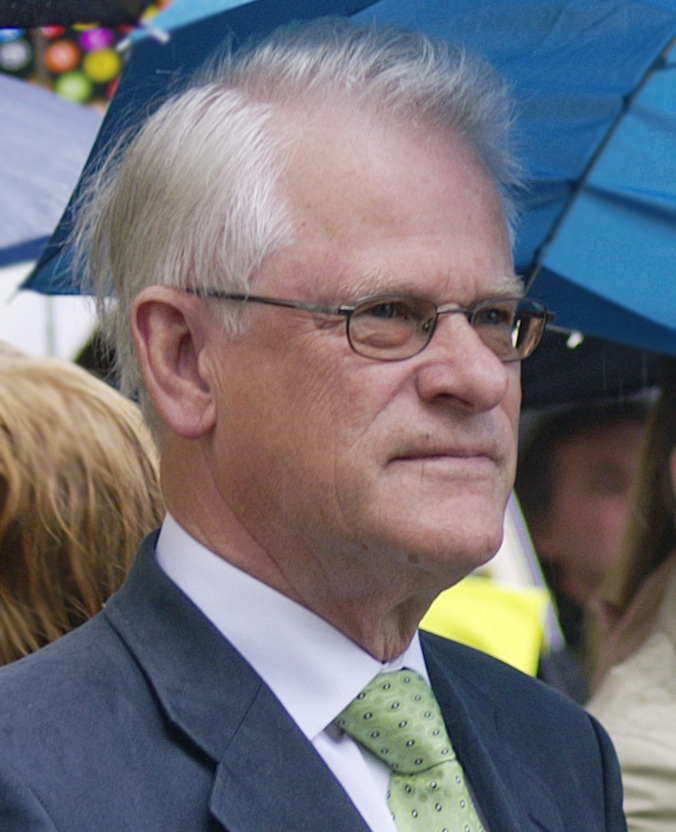

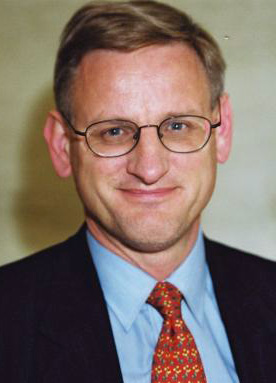

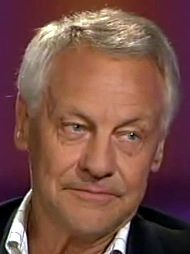

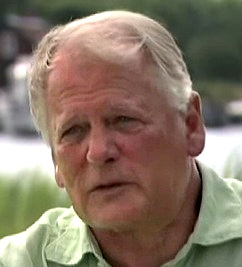

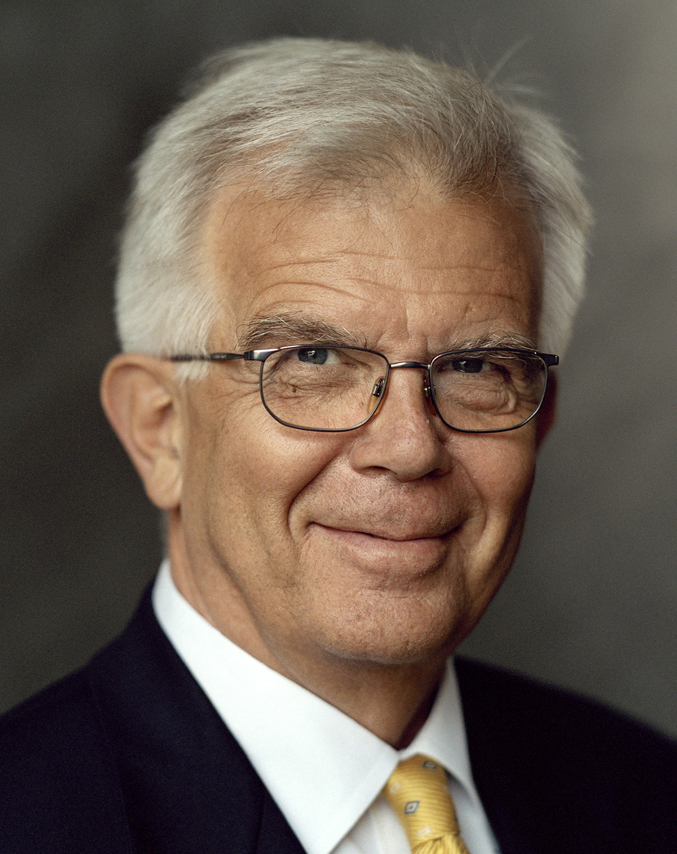

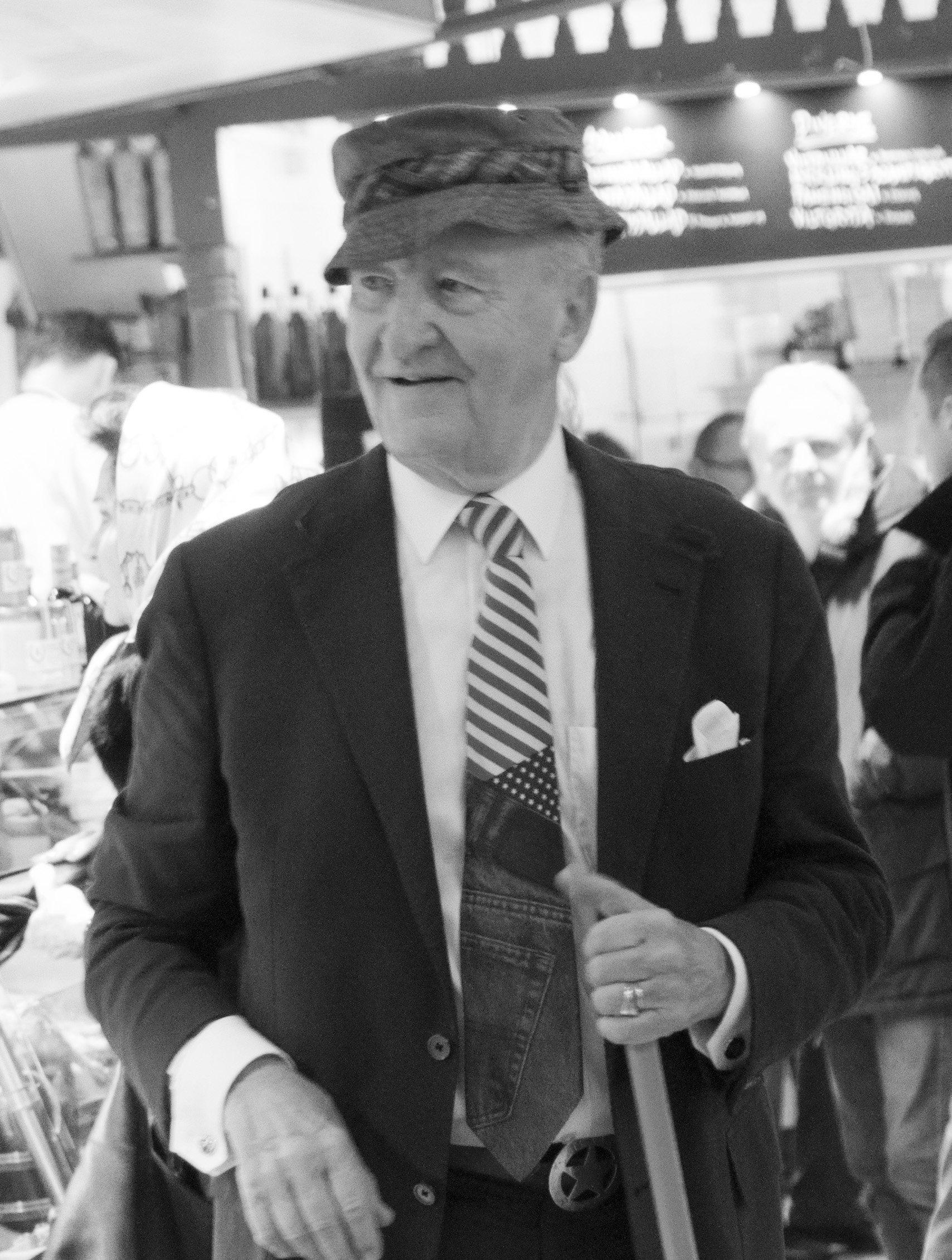

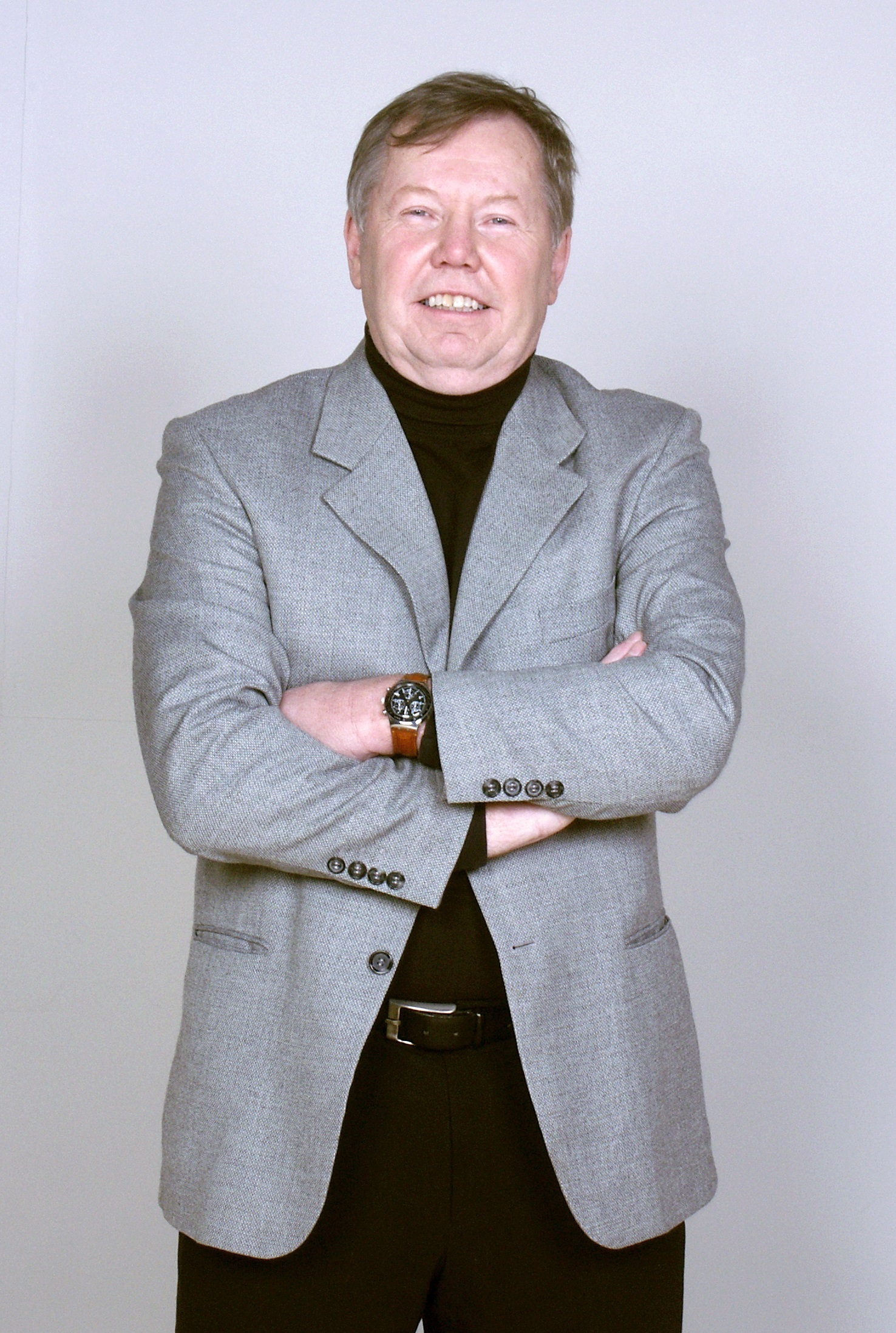

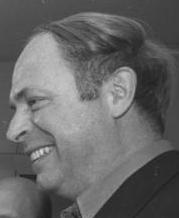
	First party	Second party	Third party
Leader	Ingvar Carlsson	Carl Bildt	Bengt Westerberg
Party	Social Democrats	Moderate	Liberal People's
Last election	156	66	44
Seats won	138	80	33
Seat change	▼18	▲14	▼11
Popular vote	2,062,761	1,199,394	499,356
Percentage	37.71%	21.92%	9.13%
Swing	▼5.50 pp	▲3.62 pp	▼3.07 pp
	Fourth party	Fifth party	Sixth party
Leader	Olof Johansson	Alf Svensson	Ian Wachtmeister; Bert Karlsson
Party	Centre	Christian Democrats	New Democracy
Last election	42	0	–
Seats won	31	26	25
Seat change	▼11	▲26	New
Popular vote	465,175	390,351	368,281
Percentage	8.50%	7.14%	6.73%
Swing	▼2.80 pp	▲4.20 pp	New
	Seventh party
Leader	Lars Werner
Party	Left
Last election	21
Seats won	16
Seat change	▼5
Popular vote	246,905
Percentage	4.51%
Swing	▼1.33 pp
- Map of the election, showing the distribution of constituency and levelling seats, as well as the largest political bloc within each constituency.
Prime Minister before election
Ingvar Carlsson
Social Democrats
Elected Prime Minister
Carl Bildt
Moderate

General elections were held in Sweden on 15 September 1991. The Swedish Social Democratic Party remained the largest party in the Riksdag, winning 138 of the 349 seats. However, it was the party's worst showing since 1928 with 37.7% of the vote.

== Aftermath ==
The election was notable due to the rise of a new right-wing populist party named New Democracy which succeeded in securing a parliamentary mandate for the first (and only) time. The four parties of the centre-right coalition (the Centre Party, People's Party, Moderates, and Christian Democrats) were allocated a combined total of 171 seats, 17 more than the two left-wing parties' 154, but still fewer than the 175 necessary for a majority. Thus the centre-right bloc was dependent upon New Democracy to secure a parliamentary majority. It was able to do so, and the Moderates' Carl Bildt became Prime Minister.

One large factor in the shift between the blocs was that the Christian Democrats managed to reach the 4% threshold by a good margin after many previous attempts. This combined with the Green Party falling short of the threshold, meant vast changes to areas yielding wins for the blue bloc. Norrköping, Västerås and Örebro, main urban areas inside the left-wing industrial belt of central Sweden, all voted blue for the first time for generations. Even so, they did only assemble pluralities as opposed to majorities in all three. The centre-right bloc also made vast gains in the capital region, the Moderate Party being the largest both in Stockholm Municipality and the surrounding Stockholm County. Led by the strong Moderate vote, Malmö also flipped to a blue plurality, overturning another historical Social Democrat stronghold.

== Debates ==
1991 Swedish general election debates
Date	Time	Organisers	Moderators	P Present I Invitee N Non-invitee							
Date	Time	Organisers	Moderators	S	M	L	C	V	KD	NyD	Refs
13 Sep	20:00	Sveriges Television	Olle Stenholm	P Ingvar Carlsson, Mona Sahlin	P Carl Bildt	P Bengt Westerber	P Olof Johansson	P Lars Werner	P Alf Svensson	P Ian Wachtmeister	

== Results ==
Party	Votes	%	Seats	+/–
Swedish Social Democratic Party	2,062,761	37.71	138	–18
Moderate Party	1,199,394	21.92	80	+14
Liberal People's Party	499,356	9.13	33	–11
Centre Party	465,175	8.50	31	–11
Christian Democratic Society Party	390,351	7.14	26	+26
New Democracy	368,281	6.73	25	New
Left Party	246,905	4.51	16	–5
Green Party	185,051	3.38	0	–20
Sjöbopartiet	27,635	0.51	0	New
Sweden Democrats	4,877	0.09	0	0
Labour List	3,645	0.07	0	New
Workers Party – Communists	2,969	0.05	0	0
Other parties	14,361	0.26	0	0
Total	5,470,761	100.00	349	0
Valid votes	5,470,761	98.34		
Invalid/blank votes	92,159	1.66		
Total votes	5,562,920	100.00		
Registered voters/turnout	6,413,407	86.74		
Source: Nohlen & Stöver, SCB

=== Seat distribution ===
Constituency	Total seats	Seats won									
Constituency	Total seats	By party							By coalition		
Constituency	Total seats	S	M	F	C	KD	ND	V	Right	Left	Others
Älvsborg North	10	4	2	1	1	1	1		5	4	1
Älvsborg South	8	3	2	1	1	1			5	3	
Blekinge	5	3	1		1				2	3	
Bohus	12	4	3	1	1	1	1	1	6	5	1
Fyrstadskretsen	19	7	6	2	1	1	1	1	10	8	1
Gävleborg	13	6	2	1	1	1	1	1	5	7	1
Gothenburg	17	6	5	2	1	1	1	1	9	7	1
Gotland	2	1			1				1	1	
Halland	10	3	3	1	1	1	1		6	3	1
Jämtland	5	3	1		1				2	3	
Jönköping	12	5	2	1	1	2	1		6	5	1
Kalmar	11	4	2	1	2	1	1		6	4	1
Kopparberg	12	5	2	1	1	1	1	1	5	6	1
Kristianstad	11	4	3	1	1	1	1		6	4	1
Kronoberg	9	3	2	1	1	1	1		5	3	1
Malmöhus	13	5	4	1	1	1	1		7	5	1
Norrbotten	10	6	1	1	1			1	3	7	
Örebro	12	5	2	1	1	1	1	1	5	6	1
Östergötland	17	8	4	1	1	1	1	1	7	9	1
Skaraborg	11	4	2	1	2	1	1		6	4	1
Södermanland	11	5	2	1	1	1	1		5	5	1
Stockholm County	37	11	12	5	2	2	3	2	21	13	3
Stockholm Municipality	26	8	9	3	1	1	2	2	14	10	2
Uppsala	11	4	2	1	1	1	1	1	5	5	1
Värmland	12	5	2	1	1	1	1	1	5	6	1
Västerbotten	10	5	1	1	1	1		1	4	6	
Västernorrland	12	6	1	1	1	1	1	1	4	7	1
Västmanland	11	5	2	1	1	1	1		5	5	1
Total	349	138	80	33	31	26	25	16	170	154	25
Source: Statistics Sweden

=== By municipality ===
Votes by municipality. The municipalities are the color of the party that got the most votes within the coalition that won relative majority.

Cartogram of the map to the left with each municipality rescaled to the number of valid votes cast.

Map showing the voting shifts from the 1988 to the 1991 election. Darker blue indicates a municipality voted more towards the parties that formed the centre-right bloc. Darker red indicates a municipality voted more towards the parties that form the left-wing bloc.

Votes by municipality as a scale from red/Left-wing bloc to blue/Centre-right bloc.

Cartogram of vote with each municipality rescaled in proportion to number of valid votes cast. Deeper blue represents a relative majority for the centre-right coalition, brighter red represents a relative majority for the left-wing coalition.

== See also ==
- List of members of the Riksdag, 1991–1994
