= Mimmi Sandén =

Swedish singer and actress

- Born: Mimmi Linnéa Marianne Sandén; 25 December 1995 (age 30)
- Origin: Stockholm, Sweden
- Genre: Pop
- Occupations: Singer, actress
- Years active: 2002–present

Mimmi Linnéa Marianne Sandén (born 25 December 1995), also known by the stage name Mimi (stylized in all caps) is a Swedish singer and actress who came to fame by becoming 1st runner up in the television show Talang 2007 (Sweden's Got Talent).

== Biography ==
As a student Sandén attended the Adolf Fredrik's Music School in Stockholm. She performed the songs "Knock on Wood", "Total Eclipse of the Heart" and "Tonight Is What It Means to Be Young"/"Holding Out for a Hero". By media she has been described to be similar to Bianca Ryan. But her career started in 2002 when she was cast in the theatre version of Fem myror är fler än fyra elefanter where she played between 2002 and 2003, she also during the same time joined Carola's Christmas show which toured around Sweden. On 28 July 2007, she performed on Sommarkrysset on TV4. Since late 2007, Mimmi has had a television show on TV4 called Mimmi & Mojje together with Morgan Johansson, and by 2009, the fifth season of the popular show was broadcast on TV4. The fifth season of Mimmi & Mojje was taped on Mallorca. Mimmi came in third place at the talent-show Stjärnskott 2008 where she performed the song "Enough is Enough" along with Ellen Jonsson, she also came second in Idrestjärnan 2008. During the summer of 2008, Sandén had a role in the musical Hujeda mej vá många sånger along with notable singers like Linus Wahlgren, Hanna Hedlund, Ola Forssmed, Bianca Wahlgren-Ingrosso, Benjamin Wahlgren, Frida Sandén, Vendela Palmgren, and Josefine Götestam. In early 2009, it was revealed that due to the success of the musical another summer of the musical would be done during the summer of 2009.

Mimmi is the younger sister of singer Molly Sandén who represented Sweden in the Junior Eurovision Song Contest 2006 and Frida Sandén who represented Sweden in the Junior Eurovision Song Contest 2007. Mimmi become the third Sandén sister to represent Sweden in the contest, where she performed the song "Du" in the Junior Eurovision Song Contest 2009 in Kyiv. This was not the first time Mimmi stood on stage in the Junior Eurovision Song Contest as she was in the choir behind her sister Molly along with other sister Frida Sandén during her performance in the Junior Eurovision Song Contest 2006. Molly then as a favour was in the choir during the Talang 2007 final when Mimmi performed.

She also is featured on Neiked's 2017 song Call Me.

== TV appearances ==
- 2007 – Talang 2007
- 2007 – Mimmi och Mojje
- 2007 – Mimmi och Mojje på Turne
- 2008 – Mimmi och Mojje i Karibien
- 2008 – Mimmi och Mojje i fjällen
- 2009 – Mimmi och Mojje – Den mystiska Mallorcapärlan
- 2009 – Junior Eurovision Song Contest 2009
- 2011 – Mimmi & Mojje – Vampyrernas återkomst

Awards and achievements
Preceded by Frida Sandén with "Nu eller aldrig"	Sweden in the Junior Eurovision Song Contest; 2009	Succeeded by Josefine Ridell with "Allt jag vill ha"
