= Peppe Eng =

Peter Eng
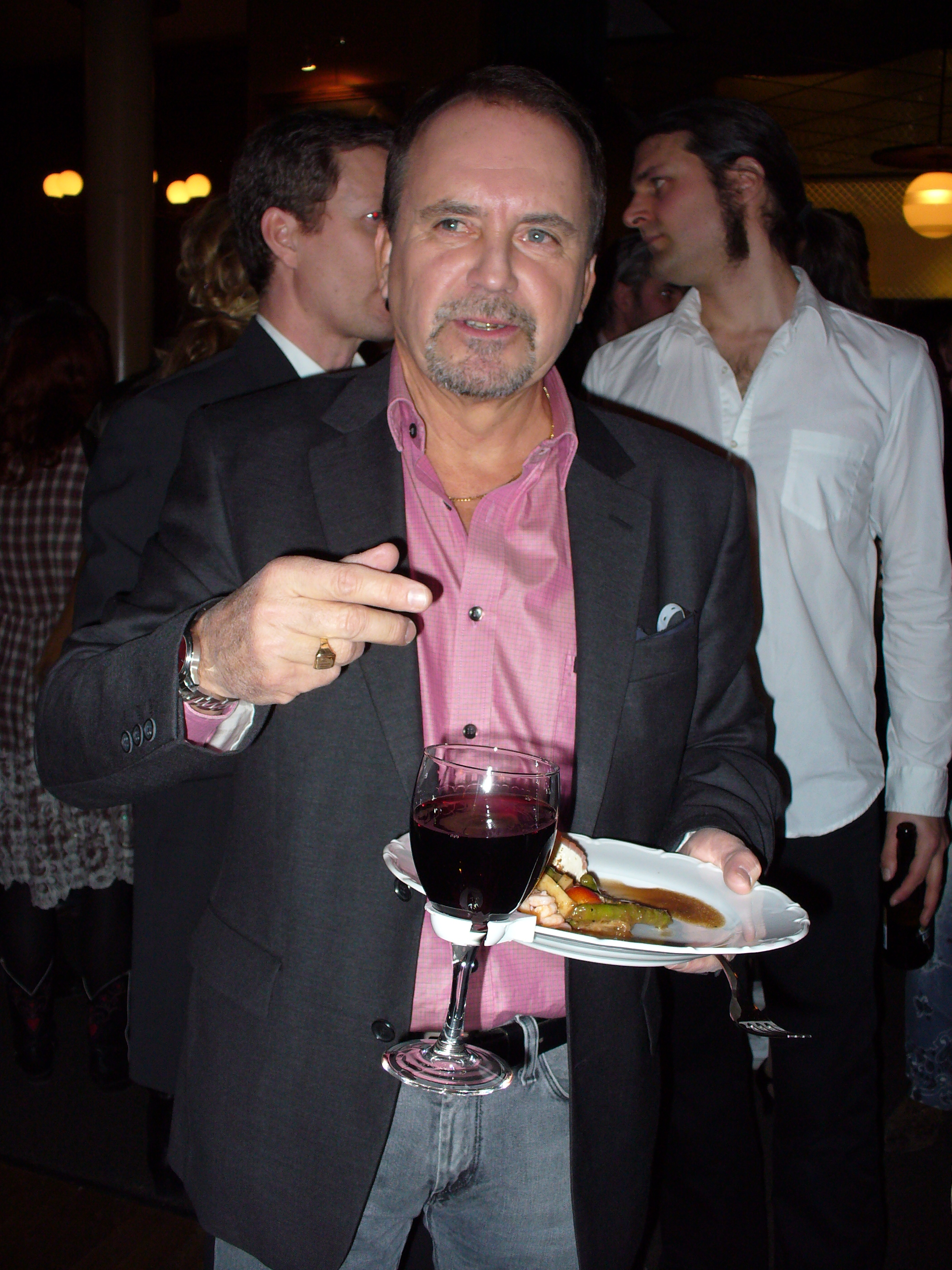
- Peter Eng during the Aftonbladet Television Awards in March 2007
- Born: 20 December 1948
- Occupations: sports journalist, television presenter

Peter "Peppe" Eng, (born 20 December 1948) is a Swedish sports journalist and television presenter working for TV4. For many years he was the presenter for TV4's sports shows Sporten and Tipslördag along with Billy Lansdowne and Peter Antoine. He is best known under the nickname of Peppe, which he got when he started working for TV4. He started his media career by presenting the radio show Radiosporten at Sveriges Radio during the 1980s. Peppe Eng's first television presenter job was on the TV4 show Småpratarna in 1994. Eng presented the 1998 World Cup broadcasts and also in the 2002 World Cup for TV4.

He has also participated in the comedyshow Time out, Sen Kväll med Luuk and he was a celebrity dancer on season one of the dancing show Let's Dance 2006.

He presented the talent show Talang 2007 and Talang 2008. After 22 years of employment on TV4 Eng retired on 31 December 2012.
