= New Democracy (Sweden) =

New Democracy Ny Demokrati
- Founders: Ian Wachtmeister; Bert Karlsson
- Founded: 4 February 1991
- Dissolved: 25 February 2000
- Headquarters: Stockholm and Gothenburg
- Ideology: Right-wing populism; National liberalism; National conservatism; Economic liberalism; Pro-Europeanism
- Political position: Right-wing
- Colours: Yellow

Website
- nydemokrati.se (defunct)

New Democracy (Swedish: Ny Demokrati, NyD) was a political party in Sweden. It was founded in 1991 and elected into the Riksdag in the 1991 Swedish general election. It lost all its seats in the Riksdag in the subsequent election in 1994, and its subsequent decline culminated in bankruptcy in February 2000, at which time it retained only one city council post. Local factions of New Democracy reformed into minor parties such as Sjöbopartiet, which experienced mixed success.

New Democracy campaigned on an agenda of reform and restricted immigration, initially on economic rather than cultural grounds. Its economic policy, stressing the importance of entrepreneurship and deregulation, was generally perceived as right-wing. The party favored Swedish application for European Union membership, which was attained in 1995. It also called for wide-scale political reform, including cutting government departments, reducing the Riksdag to 151 members and electing the Prime Minister by direct ballot.

These years were the only time a right-wing populist party had been represented in the Riksdag until the election of members of the Sweden Democrats in September 2010.

== History ==
=== Foundation ===
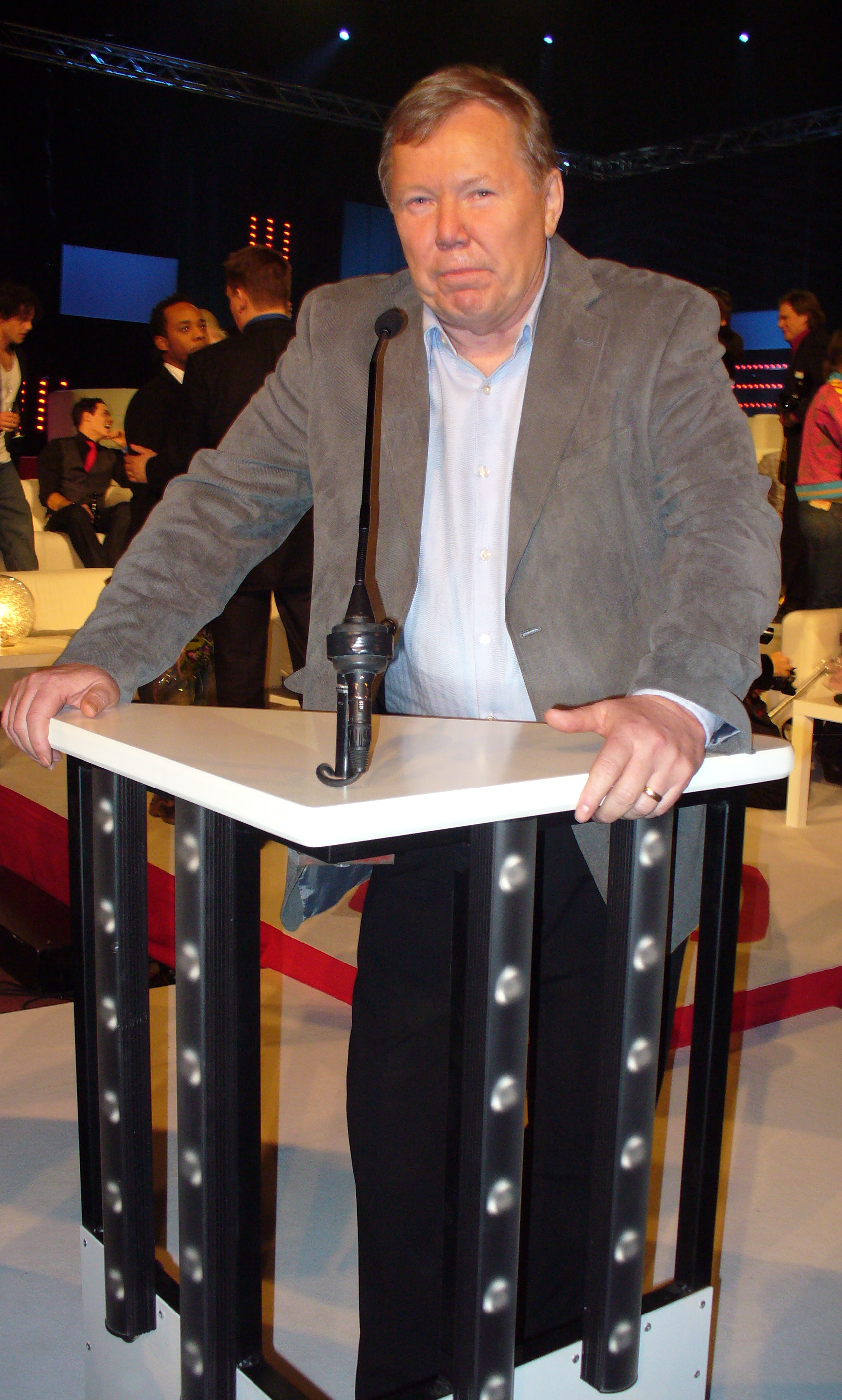
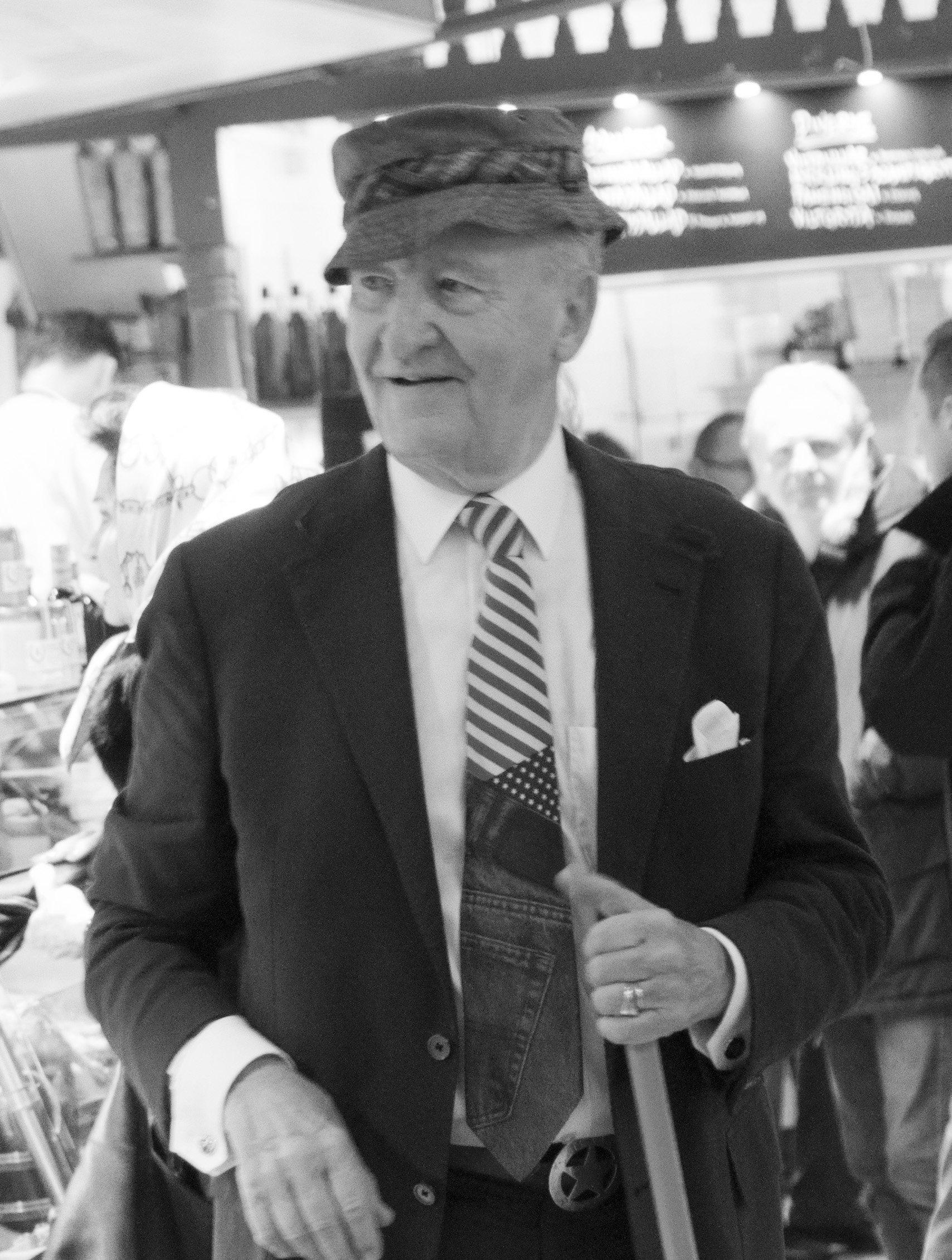
Bert Karlsson (left) and Ian Wachtmeister (right), the two founders of New Democracy.

Before New Democracy was formed, both founders Bert Karlsson and Ian Wachtmeister were well known in Sweden as charismatic public figures; Karlsson a self-made man, founder, owner and manager of both a record company and an amusement park; and Count Wachtmeister, a businessman from a highly esteemed aristocratic family. They had also been noted for some limited non-partisan political activity. They had planned starting a party for a short time, as they met for the first time in mid-November 1990 in a café at the Stockholm-Arlanda Airport, waiting for a flight. There, they discussed the matter after Wachtmeister had read in Expressen that Karlsson had "appointed" him prime minister in his dream-team government. Appearing on television on 23 November, a specially commissioned Sifo poll was announced where 23% of voters had responded that they could imagine voting for "Bert Karlsson's party". Thus, the party had been secured popular support as well as media attention already before it had been formed.

Karlsson and Wachtmeister announced the formation of their new party in an article in Dagens Nyheter on 25 November 1990, titled "Here is our party program" (Här är vårt partiprogram). The party was given the name New Democracy on 1 December 1990, and was formally founded at a meeting in Skara on 4 February 1991 after having collected the required number of signatures for official registration. A few days after the party was launched, the party received 11.7% support in an opinion poll in Dagens Industri (which apparently had been manipulated by Karlsson), and again the same in a poll in March by Sifo. It held its first party conference on 1–2 June the same year. The first big setback for the party came when Karlsson appeared on the television program Magasinet. During the show, he was incapable of answering the occasional complex political questions thrown at him by the host, and failed to explain how they sought to implement the party's political program. Karlsson in turn soon resigned as party leader.

=== In the Riksdag (1991–1994) ===
The party ran an election-show which was totally unconventional in Swedish politics. Wachtmeister and Karlsson for instance became known for illustrating their economic arguments by piling up empty beer crates. They popularly became known as "The Count and the Valet", noting their contrasting backgrounds. In the summer of 1991, some opinion polls showed more than 10% support for the party. During an election-night television program, Bengt Westerberg, leader of the Liberal People's Party, left the studio in protest against New Democracy's immigration policy. Alf Svensson of the Christian Democrats and Olof Johansson of the Centre Party followed shortly after. In the 1991 general election, the party won 6.7% of the vote and 25 seats. In the Riksdag, New Democracy abstained from voting on the office of Prime Minister, and thus gave the four-party liberal-conservative government led by Carl Bildt its indirect support.

While Karlsson would appear in the chamber in inappropriate attire, Wachtmeister engaged more willfully in politics. The two, however, soon fell out, likely due to their contradictory perspectives. By 1992, it became more clear that the party chose to campaign on a line of criticism of immigration; for instance demanding a decreased foreign aid, expulsion of immigrants committing crime, loans rather than grants and temporary residence permits instead of asylum. The party also started to disintegrate as a result of defections from the parliamentary group, exclusions, peculiar statements in the media, scandals and internal strife. In the summer of 1993, the party's rising star Vivianne Franzén started to talk about immigrant rape and Muslim ritual murders.

By October 1993, the division between Karlsson and Wachtmeister became clearer, while the party's support had fallen to around 4.4%. When Wachtmeister stepped down as chairman in February 1994, he was followed by an almost unprecedented power struggle. While Wachtmeister launched Sten Dybeck as a new chairman, Karlsson proposed Pelle Svensson and Carl Hamilton. In April, Harriet Colliander was chosen as new chairman instead, just to be followed by Wachtmeister's new candidate Vivianne Franzén in June. As the party had depended heavily on its two founders, it began to implode immediately after they started to disagree. In early 1994, the party started to initiate cooperation with parties such as the Sweden Democrats, the Sjöbo Party and the Centre Democrats.

=== Downfall (1994–2000) ===
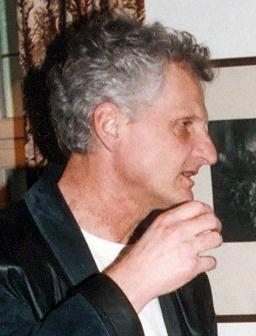
In 1997, the party leader John Bouvin released his book Riksdagen kan dra åt helvete ("The Riksdag can go to Hell").

By the next election, the party had largely become the subject of ridicule. The 1994 general election became a huge failure for the party, as it received only 1.4% of the vote and lost all its seats. The municipal elections also saw its local support shredded, where its former 335 representatives dropped to 53. Already before the election, many local chapters of the party had broken out from the party, and established new local parties. The organization became marked by internal power struggles over the control of party funds, and it quickly fell into dismay (at least at a national level). Bert Karlsson established the local party Skara Future (Skara Framtid) in 1995, and Ian Wachtmeister went on to found a party called the New Party (Det Nya Partiet) for the 1998 elections. Burned by the experience of New Democracy, Wachtmeister hand-picked the board, and the party did not have any conventions or accept any members. The party failed to attract enough votes for representation in the Riksdag and was dissolved.

The 1998 elections saw New Democracy losing all but one of its municipal representatives. The party ceased to exist when it was declared bankrupt on 25 February 2000. Laholm city council representative Elver Åkesson retained his seat until the 2002 elections, the last active member of the party to hold office. "New Democracy" was founded again in April 2002 under a new organisational registration, and attempted to run for the 2002 elections, but received a mere 106 votes nationwide. The party's website was shut down in March 2005.

== Ideology ==
Unlike other right-wing populist parties, New Democracy saw economic issues as superior and more important than cultural issues. In its introduction, the party program asserted that it would always base its policies on common sense, personal liberty and consideration for others. The 1991 election survey found that the party's voters was motivated foremost by its position on immigration issues and its economic policy, two issues that were growing in importance at the time. In addition, twice as many people as actually voted for the party, nevertheless approved of its asylum policies.

=== Taxes ===
The party set out a plan to reduce the overall taxation in Sweden from 57% (which it was in 1989), to 47% within six years, as it cited the average overall taxation in the OECD countries to be 37% the same time. It sought to reduce public expenses, sell state-owned properties and abolish state monopolies. The party competed with the Moderate Party on how steep tax cuts should be, and sought to "outbid" them.

=== Foreign policy ===
The party saw it as "obvious" for Sweden to join the European Union, and wanted to relinquish Sweden's policy of neutrality. It wanted Sweden's foreign policy to mainly concern itself with relations with Sweden's "real neighbours," which it regarded to be; Denmark, Finland, Norway, Estonia, Latvia, Lithuania, Germany, Poland and Russia, as well as its trading partners in Europe and North America. It also wanted to stop foreign aid to oppressive regimes, particularly socialist ones, and instead give aid for humanitarian efforts and emergency aid, as it wanted to "help people, not governments."

=== Law and order ===
The party wanted to invest heavily in the fight against drug abuse and street violence, and impose severe penalties for what it called related "gangster activity." It wanted to implement harder punishments for violent crime, and life imprisonment for the most dangerous criminals.

=== Immigration ===
The party's anti-immigration stance was largely argued on economic terms, most often by comparing immigration costs and tax-cuts, although welfare chauvinism also sometimes was an element. The party wanted to introduce temporary residence permits for refugees, and that those who were allowed to stay should immediately be assimilated into Swedish society. It wished to set refugees to work, rather than in camps, and to reject foreign citizens who committed serious crimes. Compared to other right-wing populist parties, issues of culture and ethnicity were heavily downplayed.

Although downplayed, in a 1991 interview Wachtmeister accused African refugees of having introduced AIDS to Sweden, and expressed displeasure about the lower share of "ethnic citizens" (ethnic Swedes) compared to other Western countries. The party's anti-immigration stance escalated during its term in the Riksdag. In the party's 1993 summer camp, Vivianne Franzén (who became party leader in 1994) described a murder committed by a mentally ill immigrant as a Muslim ritual murder, and also warned that Swedish school children soon would have to turn towards Mecca.

== International relations ==
Although typically compared to the parties, New Democracy officially distanced itself from both the right-wing populist Danish Progress Party and the Norwegian Progress Party.

== Election results ==
=== Parliament (Riksdag) ===
Election	Votes	%	Seats	+/–	Government
1991	368,281	6.7 (#6)	25 / 349	▲25	External support
1994	68,663	1.2 (#8)	0 / 349	▼25	Extra-parliamentary
1998	8,297	0.2 (#12)	0 / 349		Extra-parliamentary

=== Municipal councils ===
Election	Votes	%	Seats	+/–
1991	188,085	3.4	335 / 13,526	▲335
1994	62,550	1.1	53 / 13,550	▼282
1998	N/A	N/A	0 / 13,388	▼53

=== European Parliament ===
Election	Votes	%	Seats	+/-
1995	2,841	0.1	0 / 22	

== Party leaders ==
- Bert Karlsson (1991)
- Count Ian Wachtmeister (1991–1994)
- Harriet Colliander (1994)
- Vivianne Franzén (1994–1997)
- Bengt G. Andersson (1997)
- John Bouvin (1997–1998)
- Per Anders Gustavsson (1998–1999)
- Ulf Eriksson (1999–2000)

== See also ==
- Elections in Sweden
- List of political parties in Sweden
- Sweden Democrats
- Progress Party similar party in Denmark in the 1980s and 1990s.

== Bibliography ==
- Rydgren, Jens (2006). From tax populism to ethnic nationalism: radical right-wing populism in Sweden. Berghahn Books. ISBN 978-1-84545-218-6.
- Hannerz, Ulf (2006). "Afterthoughts". In Gingrich, André; Banks, Marcus (eds.). Neo-nationalism in Europe and beyond: perspectives from social anthropology. Berghahn Books. pp. 271–282. ISBN 978-1-84545-190-5.
