= Hanna Hedlund =

Swedish singer (born 1975)

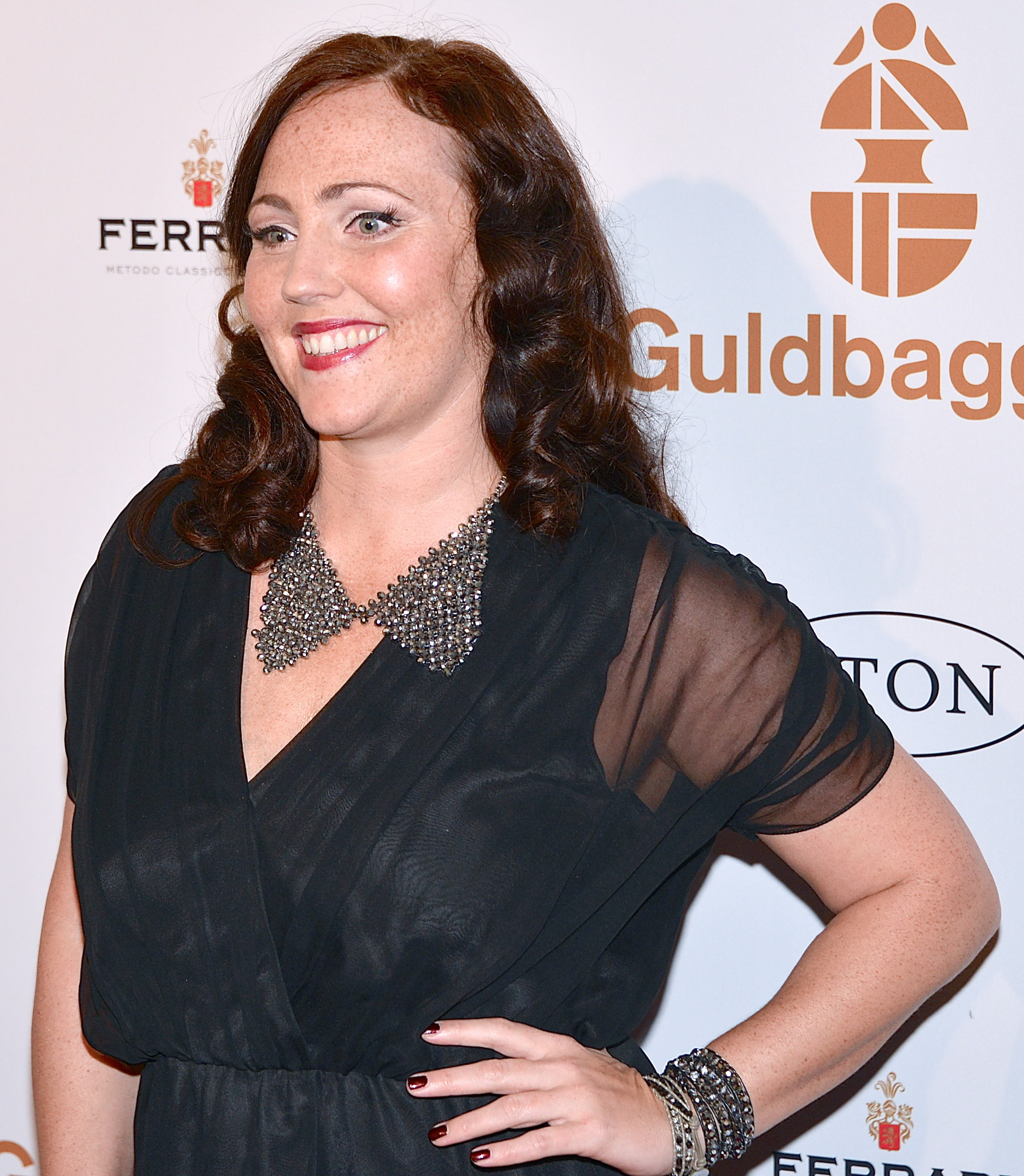
- Hanna Hedlund (2013)

Background information
- Born: 24 January 1975 (age 50); Kilafors, Sweden
- Genres: pop, schlager

Hanna Kristina Hedlund (born 24 January 1975, Kilafors, Bollnäs Municipality, Sweden) is a Swedish singer. Her sister Lina is also a singer. She has a son and a daughter with Martin Stenmarck.

== Career ==
Hedlund competed in Melodifestivalen 2000 with the song "Anropar försvunnen" and finished in eighth place. She also competed with her sister Lina in Melodifestivalen 2002 with the song "Big Time Party" and finished in ninth place.

Hedlund was a judge of the TV4 show Talang 2007, the Swedish version of Britain's Got Talent, with Bert Karlsson and Tobbe Blom.

Hedlund currently hosts the singing competition Singing Bee on TV3 in Sweden. In 2009, she participated in the Swedish version of Clash of the choirs with a choir from her hometown Bollnäs, and won the final against Erik Segerstedt.

== Discography ==
=== Singles ===
Title	Year	Peak chart positions	Album
Title	Year	SWE	Album
"Anropar försvunnen"	2000	11	Non-album singles
