= Cheeese =

European television program

- Presented by: Germany; Austria: Franziska Alber (Season 1); Julia Schäfle, Patrick Baehr (Season 2); Switzerland: Roman Aebischer; Netherlands: Iris Hesseling and Bart Boonstra; Belgium: Stef Poelmans; Denmark: Christine Milton; Sweden: Zillah & Totte; Poland: Maciej Musiał
- No. of seasons: 2
- No. of episodes: 120

Production
- Running time: 11 minutes

Original release
- Network: Nickelodeon

Cheeese is a European hidden camera show for children on Nickelodeon in Sweden, Germany, Denmark, Austria, Switzerland, and the Netherlands. The series is a spinoff of Just for Laughs Gags.

== Broadcast ==
The show premiered on 13 August 2012 on Nickelodeon. From 29 September 2012 to 21 October 2012, Cheeese was also seen in Germany and Austria on Saturday and Sunday at 8:00 pm. Later, the show was also broadcast in Norway and Poland.

Country	Premiere date	Time
Belgium	13 August 2012	6:30 pm
Denmark	13 August 2012	6:55 pm
Germany, Austria	13 August 2012	8:00 pm
Germany, Austria	13 August 2012	4:30 pm
Netherlands	13 August 2012	7:15 pm
Norway	-	-
Poland	26 November 2012	11:30 pm
Sweden	13 August 2012	6:45 pm
Sweden	13 August 2012	12:15 pm
Switzerland	13 August 2012	8:00 pm
