= John Bouvin =

Swedish politician (born 1947)

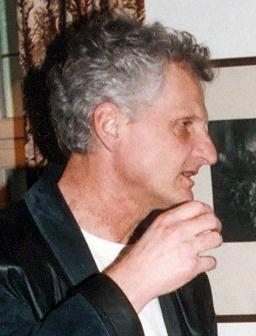
Bouvin in 1994

Ulf John Fredrik Bouvin (born 1947) is a Swedish politician and a former member of the right-wing populist party New Democracy. Bouvin was a member of the Swedish parliament from 1991 when New Democracy entered the parliament, until 1994 when the party failed to get reelected.

As a member of Parliament he became known for once making obscene gestures while speaking during a debate on civil unions.

He was leader of New Democracy for some years after its time in Parliament, but became widely unpopular within the party in 1998 after taking part in an illegal demonstration and getting arrested by police.
