= Äntligen hemma =

1997 Swedish TV show

- Country of origin: Sweden
- Original language: Swedish

Original release
- Network: TV4
- Release: 22 April 1997 – 17 October 2017

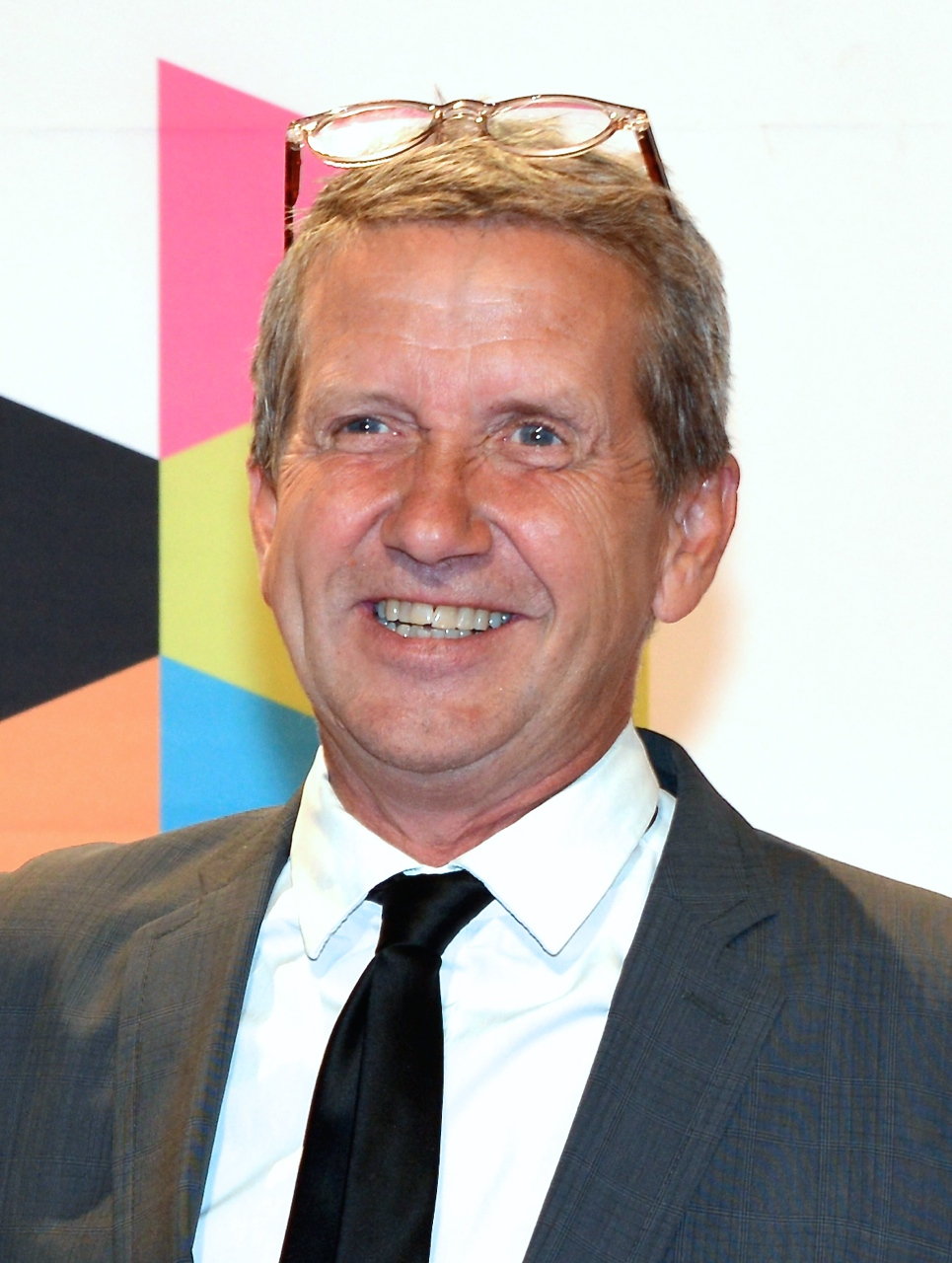
The show's host, Martin Timell in 2013

Äntligen hemma (Home at last) was a Swedish TV show on TV4 about home improvement. It aired for the first time on 22 April 1997. The show includes DIY interior decorating tips for home owners. The host, Martin Timell, is trained as a carpenter and has worked as a host for various TV shows since 1984.

Lulu Carter has been one of the decorators.

Following accusations of Timell's gross misconduct towards co-workers, TV4 removed the program from its schedule in October 2017.
