= Sofia Wistam =

Swedish television host (born 1966)

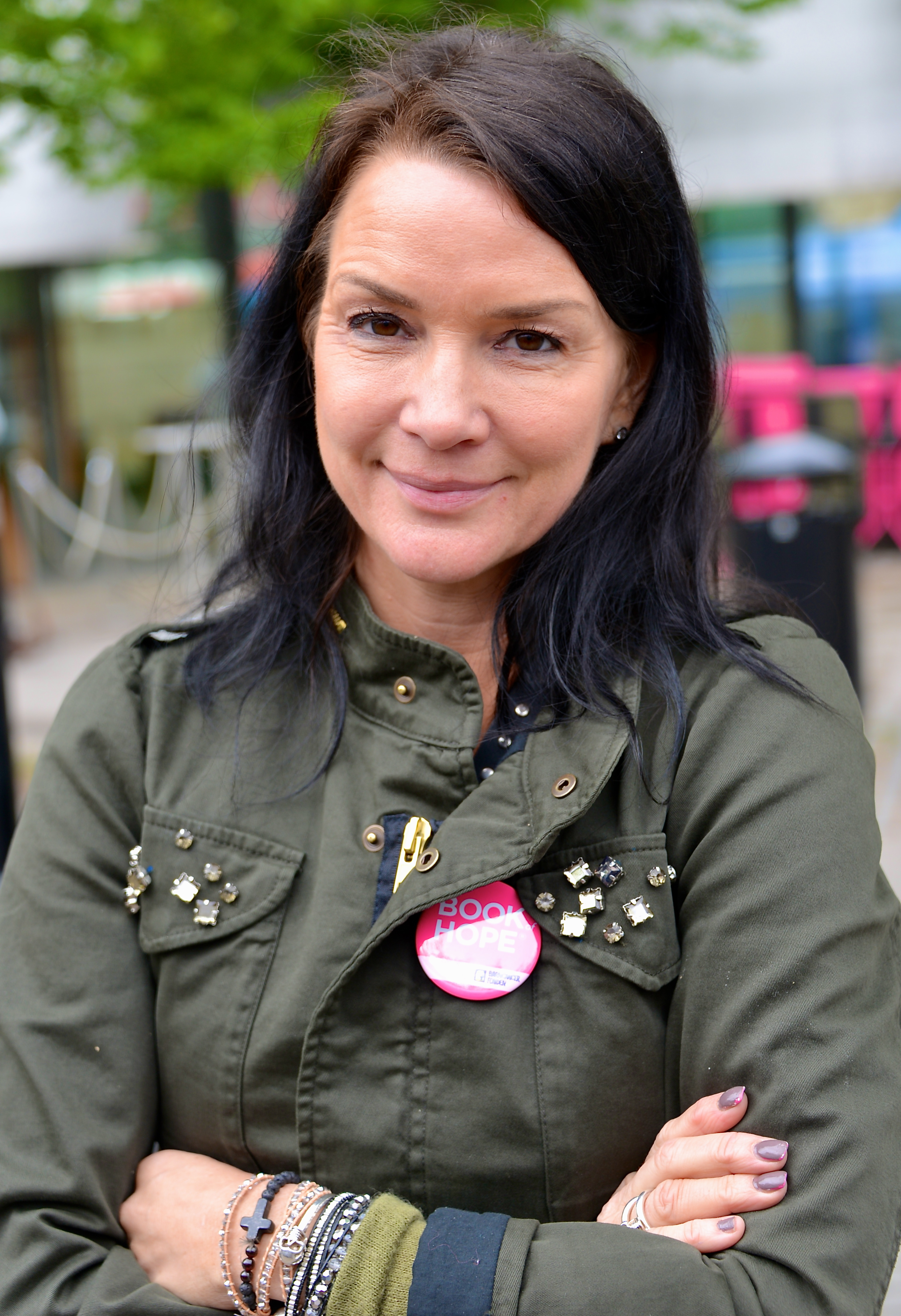
- Wistam in May 2013
- Born: Eva Olga Sofia Eklöf; 15 May 1966 (age 60); Lidingö, Sweden
- Occupations: Television presenter, radio talk-show host
- Spouses: Thomas "Orup" Eriksson (m. 1989; div. 1996) Magnus Wistam (m. 2003)
- Partner: Anders Rahm
- Children: 4 (one with Eriksson, one with Rahm, two with Wistam)

Eva Olga Sofia Wistam, during a time Eriksson, née Eklöf (born 15 May 1966, Lidingö, Stockholm County, Sweden) is a Swedish television host on TV4 and TV3 and radio talk-show host. She has also worked as a stylist for stars such as Carola, Jerry Williams and Tommy Nilsson. In 2008, she was also a judge on the talent show Sweden's Got Talent, during this year she also hosted her own radio show on Rix FM.

During 2009, Wistam hosted the competition show Wipeout on Swedish television. She would return for the 2010 series however she was replaced by Christine Meltzer for Winter Wipeout.

Wistam was an celebrity dancer in Let's Dance 2013. As of June 2022 she hosts the Swedish version of Naked Attraction.
