= Zillah & Totte =

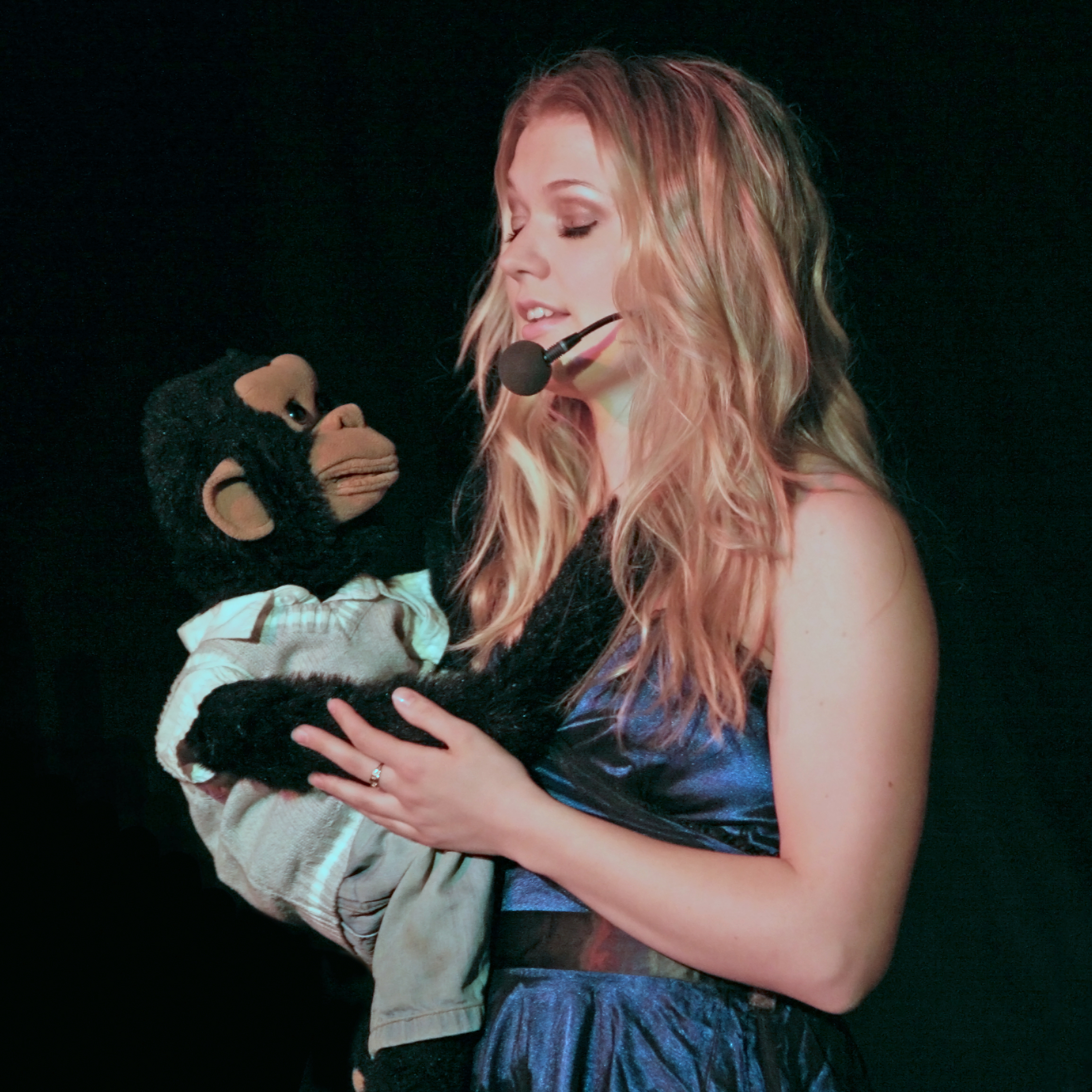
- Zillah and her monkey Totte (2009)
- Born: Cecilia Andrén; 4 January 1989 (age 37); Stockholm, Sweden
- Notable work: Det låter apa Totte (G)apar igen APTV med Zillah & Totte

Comedy career
- Medium: Stand-up; Television; Family entertainment
- Genre: Ventriloquism
- Website: www.zillah.se

Zillah & Totte is a Swedish ventriloquist act consisting of Cecilia "Zillah" Ustav and her puppet monkey Totte. Zillah was the winner of the first season of Talang, Sweden's version of Got Talent, in 2007, and received the 1,000,000 SEK prize. The following year she won the gold medal in the World Championships of Performing Arts in Hollywood and was awarded the title of Grand Champion of the World in the Variety class. Since then she has hosted four seasons of her own TV show called APTV med Zillah & Totte on the major Swedish television network TV4, and two seasons of the hidden camera show Cheeese on Swedish Nickelodeon. She continues touring with her family entertainment comedy show all over Sweden.

== Career ==
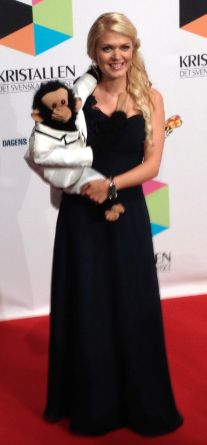
Zillah & Totte at the Kristallen awards 2012

Zillah took an early interest to ventriloquism when she received a book on the subject as a young girl. A few years later she bought her puppet monkey Totte on a trip to the UK and started performing for friends, family and small groups. In 2007, she decided to enter the first season of Talang, Sweden's version of Got Talent, and was praised by the jury. They advanced her to the semifinal where she was voted through to the final by the Swedish viewers. In the final, the viewers voted her the winner and she received the prize of 1,000,000 SEK.

Her life changed overnight, and she became one of the most-booked artists in Sweden. She toured all over the nation while continuing her high school studies. After graduating in 2008, she took part in the World Championships of Performing Arts in Hollywood and won the gold medal in the variety class. The same year also saw the start of her career in television, with the hit children's show APTV med Zillah & Totte, which has since then aired four seasons with prominent guests such as Agnes Carlsson, Danny Saucedo, Peter Magnusson and Sarah Dawn Finer. The fourth season was nominated for the Official Swedish Television Award Kristallen in 2012.

Zillah has also made numerous appearances in television shows such as Bingolotto, The Singing Bee and others. In 2012 and 2013 she was the show host for the hidden camera show Cheeese on Swedish Nickelodeon.

Zillah also does voice acting and plays the lead in the Swedish version of Henry Hugglemonster on Disney Junior.

== Totte ==
Totte is a three-year-old chimpanzee with three major interests in life: Girls, money, and soccer.

== Music ==
Zillah & Totte have released two albums - Det låter apa and Totte (G)apar igen, and several singles, including the English song "Back in monkey business", the Christmas songs "Totte i paketet" and "Vill det du får till", written by famous Swedish musician Wille Crafoord.

== External links and references ==
- Winning performance of Sweden's Got Talent 2007 (with English subtitles) on YouTube
- Zillah & Totte's video channel on YouTube
- Official website – www.zillah.se
