= Martin Timell =

Swedish television presenter (born 1957)

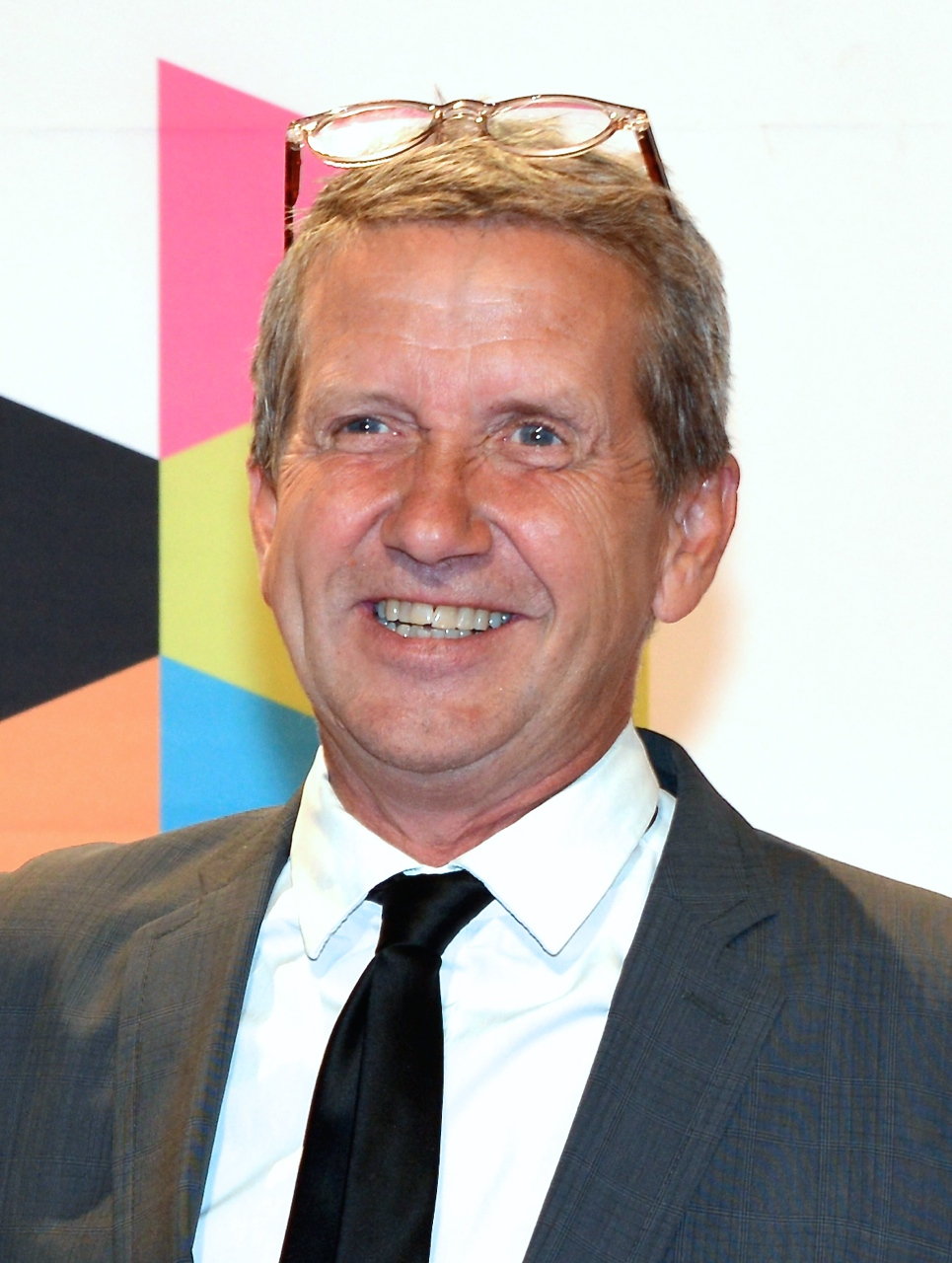
- Timell at the Kristallen gala in 2013
- Born: Carl Martin Timell; 13 November 1957 (age 68); Östermalm, Stockholm, Sweden
- Occupations: Carpenter, television presenter

Carl Martin Timell (born 13 November 1957 in Östermalm) is a Swedish television presenter.

He started his career as a television host on SVT in the 1980s, hosting several entertainment and children's programs. In 1996, he moved to TV4 where he worked as one of the channel's main profiles, as a host for multiple television programs. He is best known for hosting Äntligen hemma, one of the most successful and long-running Swedish Do it yourself-shows, since 1997.

In October 2017, all of Timell's shows on TV4 were cancelled after the hashtag #MeToo had been used by a few women to point out Timell's sexual and mental abuse of them. He was also suspended from TV4. On 6 March 2018, he was formally charged with rape for having performed digital penetration on a woman against her will whilst having a bath in a hot tub. The incident was alleged to have taken place in the fall of 2008. The trial began on 21 May 2018, and on 8 June, he was acquitted.

Timell is married and has two children. He is the brother of Anders Timell, a Swedish restaurant manager and radio host.
