= Tobbe Blom =

Swedish TV host on TV4 and magician

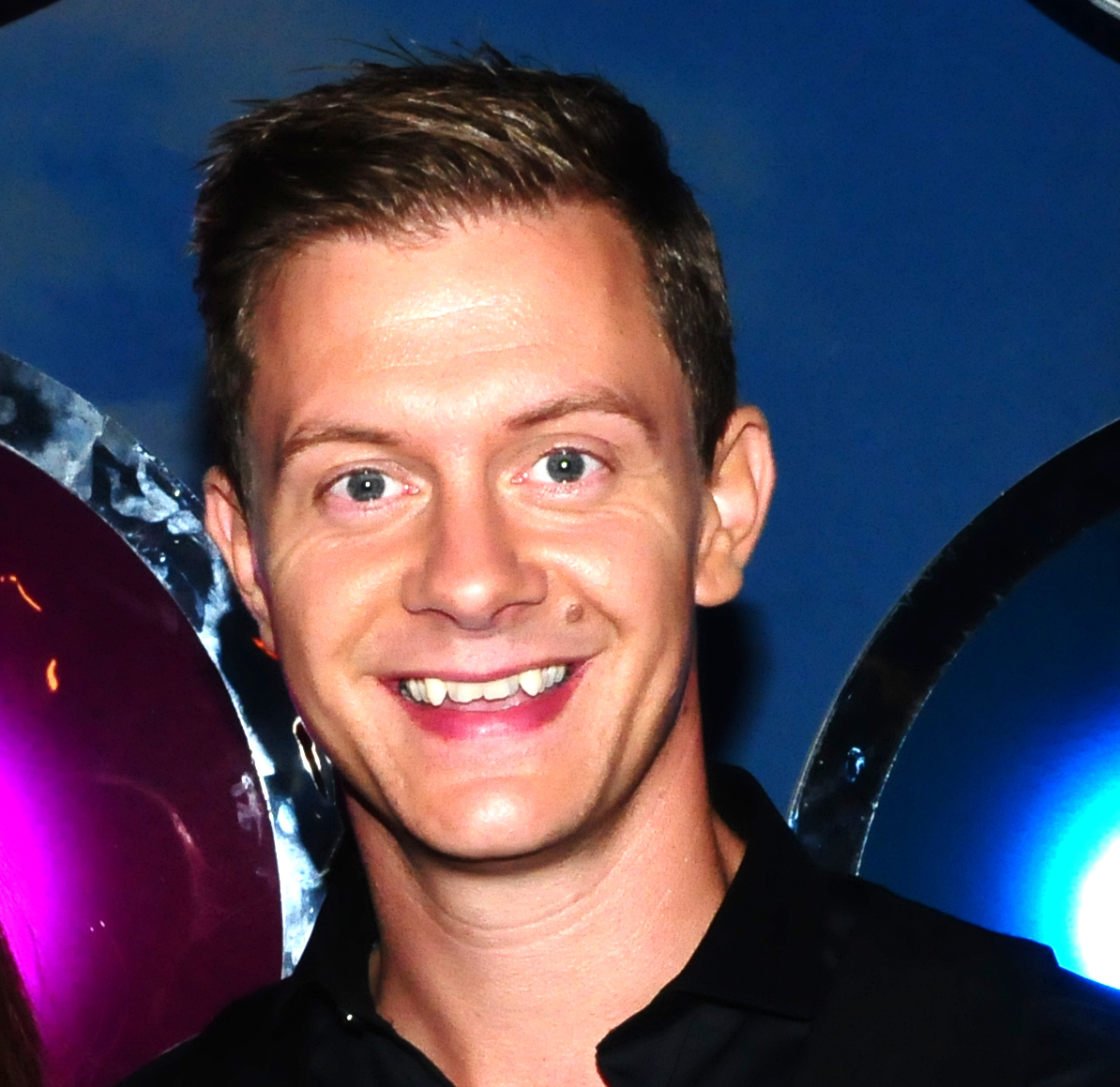
- Tobbe Blom 2014.

Tobias Peter "Tobbe" Blom (born 28 September 1975) is a Swedish TV host on TV4 and magician. He is well-known under his stage name Tobbe Trollkarl.

Tobbe was the host of Idol 2005 along Johan Wiman and has also done a kids show for morning TV on TV4. In 2007 he danced in the hit show Let's Dance and became first runner up after Martin Lidberg. Tobbe was a judge on the TV4 show Talang in 2007 and 2008, and hosted seasons 2009 – 2011.

He has provided the Swedish-dubbing voice of Spyro for The Legend of Spyro: A New Beginning, The Legend of Spyro: The Eternal Night, and The Legend of Spyro: Dawn of the Dragon. In 2013, he won the title for Kändishoppet, the Swedish version of the international reality television series Celebrity Splash!.
