= Frida Sandén =

Swedish singer (born 1994)

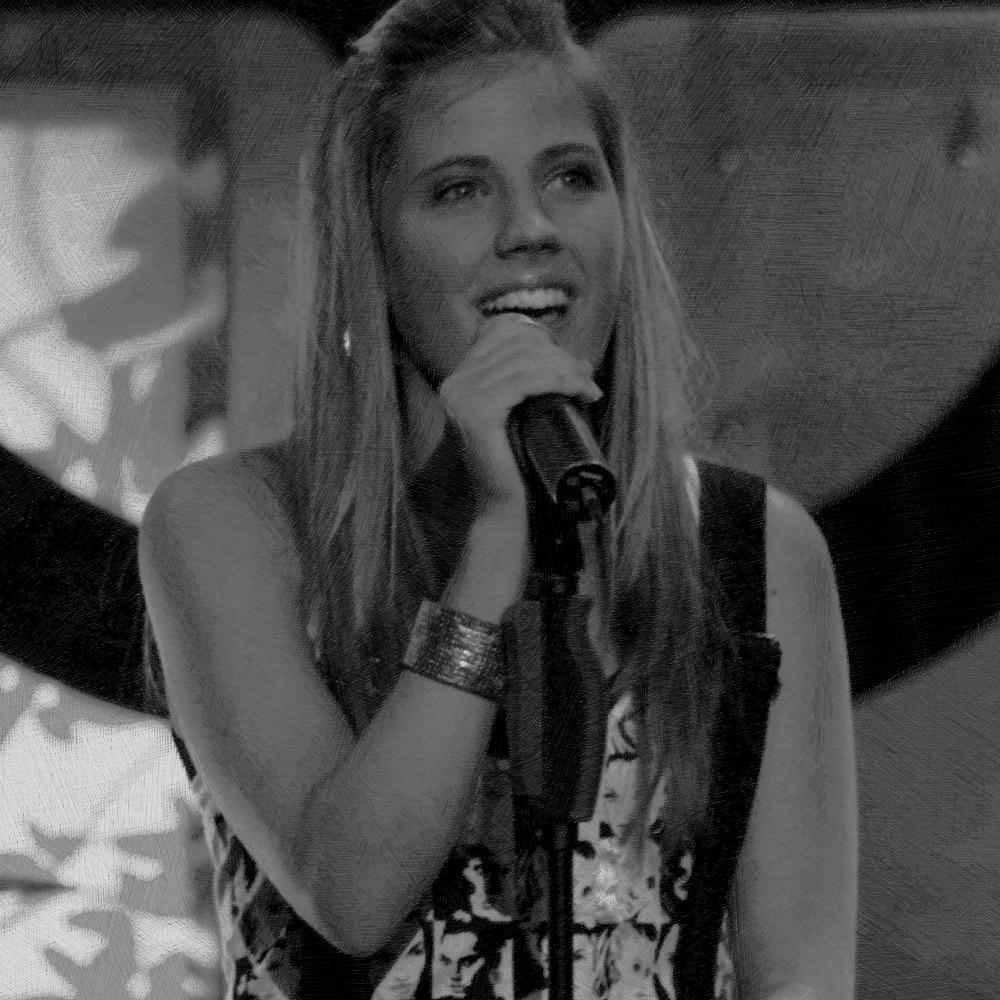

Background information
- Born: Frida Lina Marianne Sandén; 20 May 1994 (age 32)
- Origin: Stockholm, Sweden
- Genres: Pop
- Occupation: singer
- Years active: 2007–present

Frida Lina Marianne Sandén (born 20 May 1994) is a Swedish singer who represented Sweden in the Junior Eurovision Song Contest 2007 where she placed eighth. During 2008 and 2009 Frida has participated with a role in the musical Hujeda mej vá många sånger alongside her sister Mimmi and Hanna Hedlund amongst others.

As a student Sandén attended the Adolf Fredrik's Music School in Stockholm. She is the sister of Molly Sandén who represented Sweden in the Junior Eurovision Song Contest 2006 and Mimmi Sandén who represented Sweden in the Junior Eurovision Song Contest 2009. Frida was also in the choir behind her sister Molly when she performed in the Junior Eurovision Song Contest 2006.

In 2012, Frida Sandén participated in X Factor Sweden which was broadcast on TV4. She went on to the finals, where she was outvoted on 19 October and ended up 10th.

Awards and achievements
Preceded by Molly Sandén with "Det finaste någon kan få"	Sweden in the Junior Eurovision Song Contest; 2007	Succeeded by Mimmi Sandén with "Du"
