= När & fjärran =

Swedish travel show

- Genre: travel
- Country of origin: Sweden
- Original language: Swedish

Original release
- Network: TV4
- Release: 1997 – 2008

När & fjärran (English: Near and far) is a Swedish travel show which was broadcast on TV4 and later on TV4 Plus. During its first seasons it was named Reslust.
