= Kändishoppet =

- Genre: Entertainment
- Country of origin: Sweden
- Original language: Swedish

Original release
- Network: TV3

Kändishoppet is a Swedish celebrity diving show broadcast on TV3 based on the international reality television series Celebrity Splash!. Presenters are Adam Alsing and Carin da Silva. It has so far run for two seasons.
