= Ian Wachtmeister =

Swedish industrialist and politician

Count Ian Wachtmeister
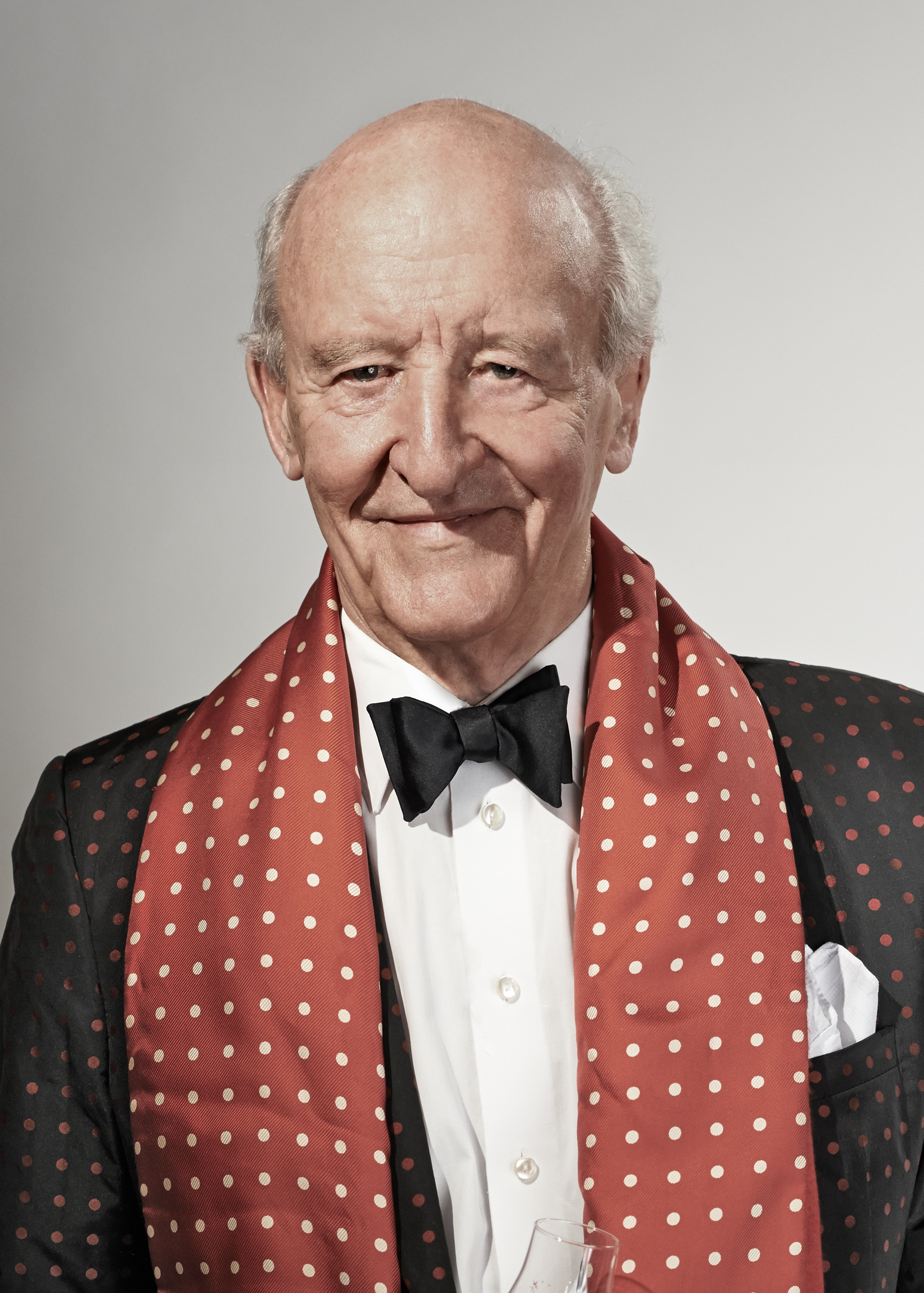

Leader of New Democracy
- In office 1991–1994
- Preceded by: Bert Karlsson
- Succeeded by: Harriet Colliander

Member of the Riksdag for Örebro County
- In office 1991–1994

Personal details
- Born: Ian Melcher Shering Wachtmeister af Johannishus; 24 December 1932 Nyköping, Sweden
- Died: 11 November 2017 (aged 84) Stockholm, Sweden
- Party: New Democracy (1991–1994); Det nya partiet
- Spouses: Ann Dickson (1955–1985); Lena Levine (1986–2005); Lil Malmström (2009–2014); Anna Eckerström (2015–2017)
- Children: Jeanette; Johan; Jesper
- Education: Royal Institute of Technology

Count Ian Melcher Shering Wachtmeister af Johannishus (Swedish: [ˈvǎktmejstɛr]; 24 December 1932 – 11 November 2017) was a Swedish nobleman (greve), mining engineer, writer, and politician. He co-founded and led the right-wing populist New Democracy (NyD) and was a member of the Riksdag (MP) for Örebro County from 1991 to 1994.

== Biography ==
Wachtmeister was born on the family estate Nääs outside Nyköping in Södermanland County on 24 December 1932. Wachtmeister studied mining and metallurgy at the Royal Institute of Technology in Stockholm and graduated in 1957. He then embarked on a successful industrial career culminating in CEO posts at Oxelösunds Järnverks AB 1970-1978 and Gränges Aluminium AB 1978–1983.

Together with record company owner Bert Karlsson he founded the populist political party New Democracy, and as party leader achieved parliamentary representation in the 1991 general election from Örebro County. The party's criticism of the Swedish immigration politics generated accusations of racism. Wachtmeister left the party in April 1994.

Prior to the election in 1998, Wachtmeister organised the short lived and unsuccessful Det nya partiet (The New Party). Thereafter he focused on managing his business interests, in particular the company The Empire.

In 2010 he was associated with the political party Sweden Democrats as a "general advisor" to their leader Jimmie Åkesson. When asked in 2009 he expressed his intention to vote for the Liberal People's Party in the 2010 Swedish general election.

He died of cancer on 11 November 2017.

== Bibliography ==
- Ankdammen (1988)
- Elefanterna (1990)
- Krokodilerna (1992)
- Grodorna (2000)
- Rebellerna : en historiebok (2009)
- Sotarna (2014)

== Ancestry ==
Ancestors of Ian Wachtmeister

8. Claes Wachtmeister
4. Fredrik Wachtmeister
9. Amalia Wrangel af Sauss
2. Ted Wachtmeister
10. Ludvig af Ugglas
5. Louise af Ugglas
11. Charlotta Antoinetta von Düben
1. Ian Wachtmeister
12. Ludvig De Geer
6. Wilhelm De Geer
13. Marianne von Schwerin
3. Adrienne De Geer
14. Tomas Funck
7. Tomasine Funck
15. Charlotta von Möller
