= Bert Karlsson =

Swedish entrepreneur and politician

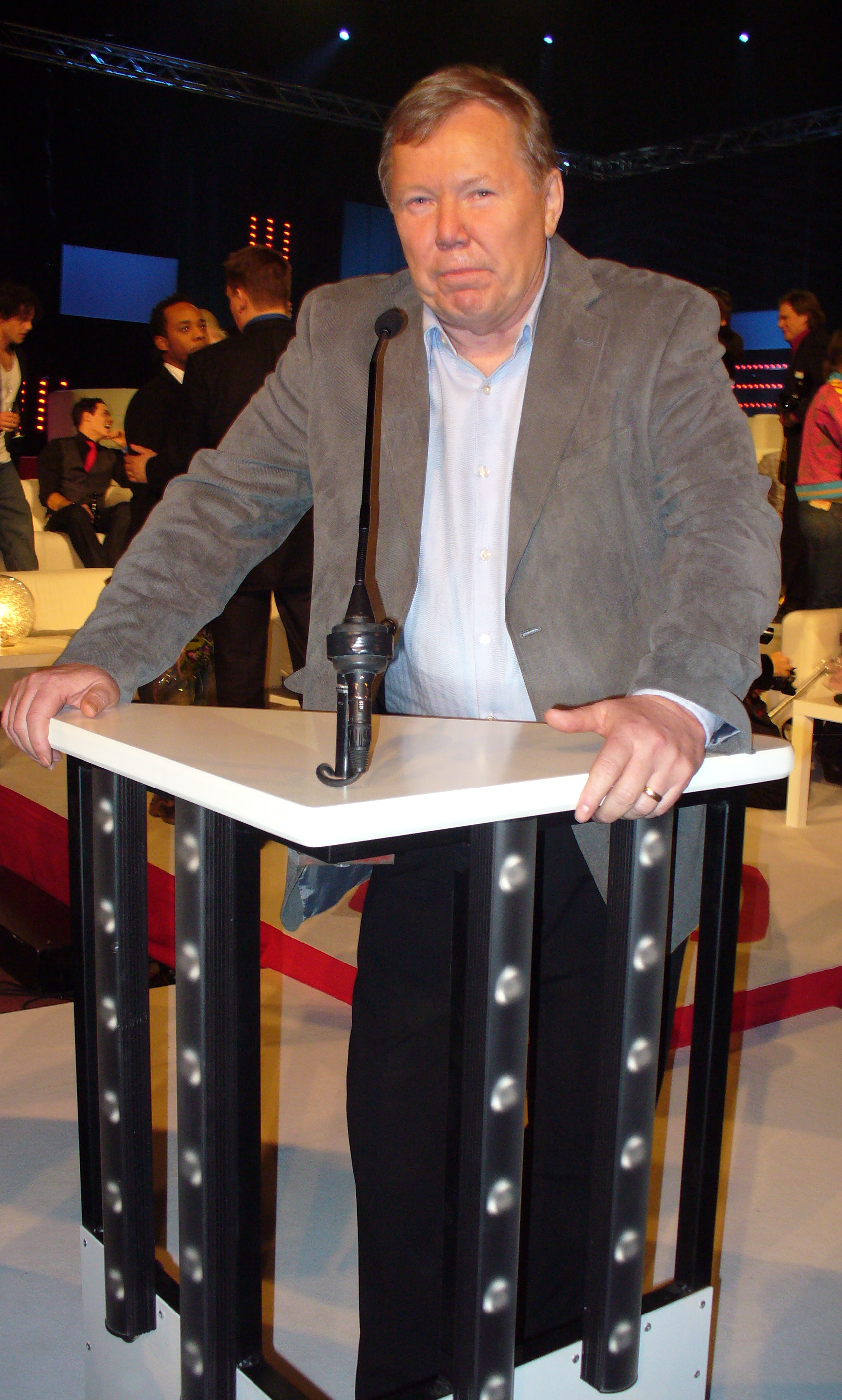
- Karlsson in 2007

Member of the Riksdag
- In office 30 September 1991 – 7 October 1994
- Constituency: Östergötland County

Personal details
- Born: Bert Willis Karlsson; 21 June 1945 (age 81) Skövde, Sweden
- Party: New Democracy (1991–1994)
- Spouse: Britt-Marie Karlsson (m. 1967)
- Children: 2
- Website: skarabert.se

Bert Willis Karlsson (born 21 June 1945) is a Swedish record company manager, entrepreneur, and former politician (Member of Parliament 1991–1994) and front figure of the New Democracy (Ny Demokrati) party.

As the owner and manager of the record company Mariann Grammofon AB, Karlsson became a familiar face to the Swedish public as the man behind singer Carola Häggkvist. In 1984 he started Skara Sommarland, a theme park.

In 1991, Karlsson and count Ian Wachtmeister started the populist political party New Democracy. Attracting major media attention, and with a patriotic platform, the party received 6.7 percent of the vote in the parliamentary election in September. With no previous political experience, Karlsson suddenly found himself elected to the Riksdag as a Member of Parliament.

When the New Democracy party imploded due to internal struggles and failed in the 1994 general election, Karlsson went back to being a full-time businessman. He has started the popular Swedish reality television show Fame Factory, (a programme somewhat similar to the British show Pop Idol), in which he played an important role. Many Mariann artists have entered Melodifestivalen, the Swedish qualifications for the Eurovision Song Contest. From 1978 to 2005, approximately 120 songs from Karlsson's record company competed, and 14 of these went on to represent Sweden in the Eurovision Song contest. Mariann artists include Herreys and Charlotte Perrelli, who went on to win the Eurovision Song Contest (1984 and 1999, respectively).

In March 2005, Karlsson filled out an application for membership in the Liberal People's Party during a television interview. When the party immediately responded with criticism of him, calling the move a media stunt, he did not go through with his application.

Karlsson was a judge in the first five seasons of the TV show Talang on TV4, the Swedish version of America's Got Talent, between 2007 and 2011.
